= List of Sites of Special Scientific Interest in East Sussex =

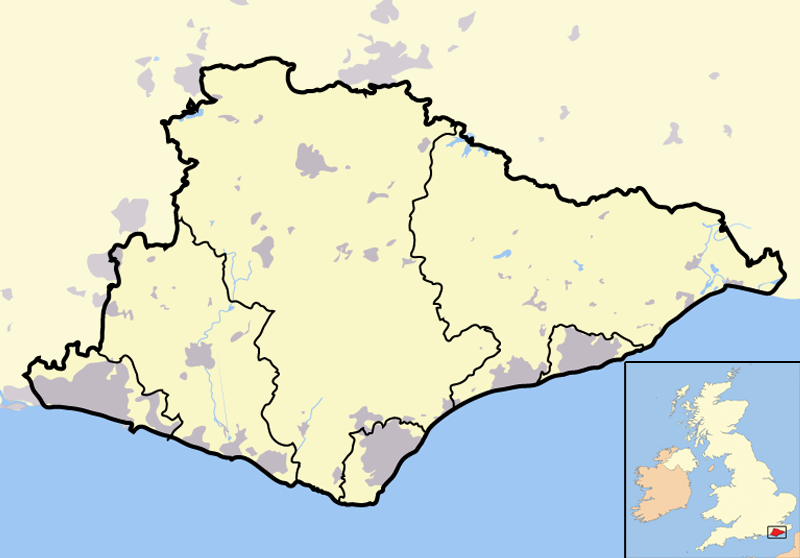
East Sussex, and its location within the United Kingdom

In England, Sites of Special Scientific Interest (SSSIs) are designated by Natural England, which is responsible for protecting England's natural environment. Designation as an SSSI gives legal protection to the most important wildlife and geological sites. As of March 2019, there are 65 sites designated in East Sussex, 45 of which have been designated for their biological interest, 15 for their geological interest, and 5 for both biological and geological interest.

Six sites are Special Areas of Conservation, two are Special Protection Areas, two are Ramsar sites, twenty are Geological Conservation Review sites, ten are Nature Conservation Review sites, five are national nature reserves, ten are local nature reserves, six are in Areas of Outstanding Natural Beauty, two are on the Register of Historic Parks and Gardens and three contain scheduled monuments. Nine sites are managed by the Sussex Wildlife Trust and one by the Royal Society for the Protection of Birds.

East Sussex is a county in South East England. It is bordered by Kent to the north-east, West Sussex to the west, Surrey to the north and the English Channel to the south. It has an estimated population of 757,600 within an area of 1,795 km^{2} (443,554.2 acres), therefore making it the 28th largest ceremonial county in the United Kingdom.

== Interest ==
- B = site of biological interest
- G = site of geological interest

== Public access ==
- FP = access to footpaths through the site only
- NO = no public access to site
- PL = public access at limited times
- PP = public access to part of site
- YES = public access to all or most of the site

== Other classifications ==
- AONB = Area of Outstanding Natural Beauty
- GCR = Geological Conservation Review
- LNR = Local nature reserve
- NCR = Nature Conservation Review site
- NNR = National nature reserve
- NT = National Trust
- Ramsar = Ramsar site, an internationally important wetland site
- RHPG= Register of Historic Parks and Gardens of Special Historic Interest in England
- RSPB = Royal Society for the Protection of Birds
- SAC = Special Area of Conservation
- SM = Scheduled monument
- SPA = Special Protection Area under the European Union Directive on the Conservation of Wild Birds
- SWT = Suffolk Wildlife Trust
- WWT = Wildfowl & Wetlands Trust

== Sites ==
| Site name | Photograph | B | G | Area (Note: The area and grid reference are taken from the "Details" page for each site on the Natural England database.) | Public access | Location | Other classifications | Map (Note: The maps are provided by Natural England on the Magic Map website.) | Citation (Note: Citations are provided for each site by Natural England.) | Description |
|---|---|---|---|---|---|---|---|---|---|---|
| Arlington Reservoir | Arlington Reservoir | ✓ | | 100.4 hectares (248 acres) | YES | Polegate; 50.845°N 0.179°E; TQ 535 073 | LNR | Map | Citation | More than 10,000 birds winter on this site, including over 1% of the UK population of wigeon. In addition, more than 170 species of birds on passage have been recorded. the River Cuckmere runs through the reservoir and there are areas of tall fen and exposed shingle. |
| Asham Quarry | Asham Quarry | | ✓ | 2.6 hectares (6.4 acres) | NO | Lewes; 50.834°N 0.045°E; TQ 441 058 | AONB GCR | Map | Citation | This site provides important biostratigraphical and lithostratigraphical evidence about environmental conditions during the last 100,000 years, the Last Glacial Period and the Holocene. It is notable for its extensive early and mid Holocene deposits and for having yielded a series of radiocarbon dates. |
| Ashburnham Park | Ashburnham Park | ✓ | | 109.9 hectares (272 acres) | FP | Battle; 50.907°N 0.412°E; TQ 697 147 | NCR RHPG | Map | Citation | This former medieval deer park has many ancient trees which support more than 160 species of lichens. The habitats are parkland and woodland together with three ornamental lakes. The woods have a diverse selection of breeding bird species. |
| Ashdown Forest | Ashdown Forest | ✓ | | 3,213.1 hectares (7,940 acres) | YES | Uckfield; 51.058°N 0.066°E; TQ 449 308 | LNR NCR SAC SPA SWT | Map | Citation | This is one of the largest areas of heath, semi-natural woodland and valley bog in south-east England. It is important for its heath and woodland bird species, its rich invertebrate fauna and its uncommon plants. There are several streams, some of which have been dammed to form large ponds and they have a diverse aquatic fauna. |
| Bingletts Wood | Bingletts Wood | ✓ | | 16.0 hectares (40 acres) | NO | Heathfield; 50.967°N 0.307°E; TQ 621 211 | | Map | Citation | Part of this ancient wood is a steep sided valley which has a warm and moist microclimate and it is rich in mosses and liverworts. A woodland glade has two ponds which support white water lily and several species of pondweed. |
| Blackhorse Quarry | Blackhorse Quarry | | ✓ | 0.2 hectares (0.49 acres) | NO | Battle; 50.900°N 0.513°E; TQ 768 142 | GCR | Map | Citation | This is the Type locality for the Wadhurst Clay Formation Telham Bond Bed, which dates to the Early Cretaceous and is part of the Wealden Group. It has yielded many fossils, including turtles, crocodiles, pterosaurs and dinosaurs. |
| Bream Wood | Bream Wood | ✓ | | 7.8 hectares (19 acres) | NO | Crowborough; 51.074°N 0.173°E; TQ 523 328 | | Map | Citation | This steep sided valley wood has several locally rare ferns and mosses. There are a number of small ponds and acid springs and flora include the rare moss Dicranodontium denudatum at one of only two known locations in south-east England. The dry upper slopes have ancient woodland. |
| Brede Pit and Cutting | Brede Pit and Cutting | | ✓ | 0.6 hectares (1.5 acres) | NO | Rye; 50.936°N 0.605°E; TQ 831 184 | GCR | Map | Citation | This site shows the junction between two formations in the Wealden Group, dating to the Early Cretaceous. It exposes the top 2 metres of the Ashdown Formation and the bottom 1.5 metres of the Wadhurst Clay Formation. The environments change from shallow fluvial to deeper lakes and lagoons and there are fossils of plants, fishes and reptiles. |
| Brighton to Newhaven Cliffs | Brighton to Newhaven Cliffs | ✓ | ✓ | 165.4 hectares (409 acres) | YES | Brighton; 50.796°N 0.029°W; TQ 390 014 | GCR LNR | Map | Citation | The main interest of this site is geological and it has many fossil fauna dating to the late Santonian and early Campanian in the Upper Cretaceous. It is also important for Quaternary stratigraphy. The cliff face and top have some rare plants. |
| Burgh Hill Farm Meadow | Burgh Hill Farm Meadow | ✓ | | 0.9 hectares (2.2 acres) | NO | Lewes; 50.894°N 0.184°E; TQ 537 128 | | Map | Citation | This meadow is managed to encourage wildlife and 67 species of flowering plants have been recorded, such as yellow rattle, pepper saxifrage and green winged orchid. The site also has a ditch, two small ponds and mature hedgerows. |
| Buxted Park | Buxted Park | ✓ | | 84.7 hectares (209 acres) | FP | Uckfield; 50.984°N 0.120°E; TQ 489 227 | | Map | Citation | This old deer park is important for its invertebrates, especially those associated with mature trees and dead wood. Over fifty nationally scarce beetles have been recorded and four which are nationally rare, Ptenidium gressneri, Aderus brevicornis, Prionocyphon serricornis and Aleochara sanguinea. |
| Castle Hill | Castle Hill | ✓ | | 114.6 hectares (283 acres) | YES | Brighton; 50.841°N 0.053°W; TQ 372 064 | NCR NNR SAC | Map | Citation | This is chalk grassland, which is a nationally uncommon habitat. It is rich in flowering plants and there are areas of scrub which are valuable for breeding birds. The diverse orthopteran insect species include the nationally rare wart-biter grasshopper. |
| Chailey Common | Chailey Common | ✓ | | 170.9 hectares (422 acres) | YES | Lewes; 50.973°N 0.030°W; TQ 384 211 | LNR | Map | Citation | This common on Ashdown Sands has areas of acidic grassland, marshy grassland, bracken, wet heath, dry heath, a stream, ditches and ponds. Butterfly species include the silver-studded blue, grayling, pearl-bordered fritillary, high brown fritillary, green hairstreak and small pearl-bordered fritillary. |
| Clayton to Offham Escarpment | Clayton to Offham Escarpment | ✓ | | 422.5 hectares (1,044 acres) | PP | Lewes; 50.897°N 0.075°W; TQ 355 126 | SWT | Map (Note: Clayton to Offham Escarpment is partly in West Sussex) | Citation | Much of this site is steeply sloping chalk grassland, which has many flowering plants such as glaucous sedge, autumn gentian, marjoram, squinancywort and several species of orchid. There are also areas of woodland and scrub and the site has a rich community of breeding birds. |
| Combe Haven | Combe Haven | ✓ | | 153.0 hectares (378 acres) | PP | Hastings; 50.863°N 0.512°E; TQ 769 101 | LNR SWT | Map | Citation | This site has diverse habitats. Most of it is poorly drained alluvial meadows which are divided by drainage ditches. There is also ancient woodland and Filsham Reed Beds is the largest area of reed beds in the county. There are diverse breeding and wintering birds and many species of butterflies. |
| Dallington Forest | Dallington Forest | ✓ | | 16.1 hectares (40 acres) | YES | Robertsbridge; 50.961°N 0.351°E; TQ 652 206 | | Map | Citation | The Willingford Stream has cut through forest, creating a steep sided valley with a warm and moist microclimate and the woodland in the valley is the main feature of the site. In the north, beech and oak are dominant, whereas in the south the main trees are oak, birch and hazel. In the bottom of the valley there are stands of alder. |
| Darwell Wood | Darwell Wood | ✓ | | 37.5 hectares (93 acres) | YES | Robertsbridge; 50.955°N 0.433°E; TQ 710 201 | | Map | Citation | Several streams run through this area of broadleaved woodland. Most of it is mature hornbeam coppice with oak standards and a sparse ground layer mainly of mosses. The streams have produced steep sided valleys and there are many breeding birds. |
| Ditchling Common | Ditchling Common | ✓ | | 66.5 hectares (164 acres) | YES | Burgess Hill; 50.951°N 0.102°W; TQ 334 185 | | Map | Citation | The common has several different types of acidic heath grassland, together with areas of bracken, scrub, woodland, streams and a pond. The rich butterfly and moth fauna includes several uncommon species such as the small pearl-bordered fritillary and green hairstreak butterflies. |
| Dungeness, Romney Marsh and Rye Bay | Dungeness, Romney Marsh and Rye Bay | ✓ | ✓ | 10,172.9 hectares (25,138 acres) | PP | Romney Marsh; 50.946°N 0.857°E; TR 008 202 | AONB GCR LNR NNR Ramsar RSPB SAC SPA SWT | Map (Note: Dungeness, Romney Marsh and Rye Bay and High Rocks are partly in Kent) | Citation | Nationally important habitats in this site are saltmarsh, sand dunes, vegetated shingle, saline lagoons, standing waters, lowland ditch systems, and basin fens, and it has many rare and endangered species of fauna and flora. It is geologically important as its deposits display the chronology of coastal evolution. |
| Eridge Green | Eridge Green | ✓ | | 8.4 hectares (21 acres) | YES | Tunbridge Wells; 51.100°N 0.218°E; TQ 554 357 | SWT | Map | Citation | This is ancient woodland on clay with outcrops of sandstone which form cliffs up to ten metres high. Flora on the rocks include Tunbridge filmy fern, the mosses Dicranum scottianum and Orthodontium gracile and the liverworts Scapania umbrosa, Scapania gracilis and Harpanthus scutatus. |
| Eridge Park | Eridge Park | ✓ | | 396.8 hectares (981 acres) | YES | Tunbridge Wells; 51.088°N 0.248°E; TQ 575 345 | NCR RHPG | Map | Citation | The site has parkland and ancient woodland. It is of national importance for its lichens, with 167 recorded species in one of the richest epiphytic lichen floras of any park in Britain. It is also nationally important for dragonflies with 22 species and there are 60 species of breeding birds. |
| Firle Escarpment | Firle Escarpment | ✓ | | 302.1 hectares (747 acres) | PP | Lewes; 50.832°N 0.089°E; TQ 472 057 | | Map | Citation | This is a long stretch of chalk grassland on north facing slopes of the South Downs. Flora include the very rare early spider orchid and other unusual flowering plants such as pyramidal orchid, felwort, common spotted orchid, round headed rampion, clove pink and bee orchid. |
| Folkington Reservoir | Folkington Reservoir | ✓ | | 5.8 hectares (14 acres) | FP | Polegate; 50.810°N 0.219°E; TQ 564 035 | | Map | Citation | The banks of the reservoir support a rich chalk grassland flora including kidney vetch, horseshoe vetch, pyramidal orchid, fragrant orchid and the rare and protected hairy mallow. The reservoir itself is covered and the bare chalk on top supports ruderal species such as scarlet pimpernel and parsley piert. |
| Fore Wood | Fore Wood | ✓ | | 20.9 hectares (52 acres) | YES | Battle; 50.888°N 0.491°E; TQ 753 128 | | Map | Citation | The woodland in this steep valley is variable and it has been considerably modified in some areas. Flora include hay-scented buckler-fern, greater wood-rush and hard fern, as well as three rare mosses. There is also a rich community of breeding birds. |
| Hastingford Cutting | Hastingford Cutting | | ✓ | 0.04 hectares (0.099 acres) | YES | Uckfield; 51.012°N 0.170°E; TQ 523 259 | GCR | Map | Citation | This site exposes rocks dating to the Hastings Beds of the Early Cretaceous. It has coarse sandstone with pebbles and fossil charcoal in a channel which is interpreted as part of a braided system. It underlies a layer which is thought to be part of the shore of a lake. |
| Hastings Cliffs to Pett Beach | Hastings Cliffs to Pett Beach | ✓ | ✓ | 312.2 hectares (771 acres) | YES | Hastings; 50.873°N 0.651°E; TQ 866 115 | GCR LNR NCR SAC | Map | Citation | The crumbling cliffs in this site expose many formations and fossils dating to the Cretaceous period and it is described by Natural England as "of national and international importance for reference". Steep sided wooded valleys have lichens associated with ancient woodland and uncommon and rare beetles. Near the coast there are stunted trees affected by salt spray and important bryophyte flora, including the liverwort Lophocolea fragans at its only locality in south-east England. |
| Heathfield Park | Heathfield Park | ✓ | | 41.0 hectares (101 acres) | NO | Heathfield; 50.965°N 0.269°E; TQ 594 209 | | Map | Citation | This is a steep valley carved by a stream. The sheltered wooded habitat has a warm and moist microclimate and it has a number of plant species usually restricted to western Britain, such as Cornish moneywort, hay-scented buckler-fern and the liverwort Frullania tamarisci. The site is also important for lichens and 76 species have been recorded. |
| Hemingfold Meadow | Hemingfold Meadow | ✓ | | 4.9 hectares (12 acres) | NO | Battle; 50.905°N 0.526°E; TQ 777 148 | | Map | Citation | This site consists of two adjacent meadows which have been managed with a grazing and mowing regime which maintains the flora. More than sixty species of flowering plant have been recorded, including common spotted orchid, ox-eye daisy, cuckoo flower, pignut, yellow rattle and primrose. |
| Herstmonceux Park | Herstmonceux Park | ✓ | | 4.3 hectares (11 acres) | FP | Hailsham; 50.873°N 0.344°E; TQ 650 108 | | Map | Citation | This narrow stream valley has seven examples of wetland habitats on Tunbridge Wells sandstone and it is notable for its fen vegetation. The site is the location of two plants which are rare in south-east England, milk-parsley and Cornish moneywort. There are several artificial ponds which have a variety of aquatic plant species. |
| High Rocks | High Rocks | | ✓ | 3.3 hectares (8.2 acres) | PP | Tunbridge Wells; 51.123°N 0.226°E; TQ 559 383 | GCR | Map | Citation | This Pleistocene site is described by Natural England as "a key geomorphological site for sandstone weathering features developed on the highest cliffs in the Weald". The Ardingly Sandstone has micro-cracking of unknown origin. |
| High Woods | High Woods | ✓ | | 33.7 hectares (83 acres) | YES | Bexhill-on-Sea; 50.862°N 0.433°E; TQ 713 098 | | Map | Citation | This site has several different habitats, including the only area of sessile oak coppice in the county. There are also areas of pedunculate oak and birch woodland, acidic grassland on wet heath, ponds and streams. Moss species include Sphagnum squarrosum and Hookeria lucens. |
| Houghton Green Cliff | Houghton Green Cliff | | ✓ | 0.1 hectares (0.25 acres) | YES | Rye; 50.969°N 0.747°E; TQ 930 224 | GCR | Map | Citation | This site exposes the Cliff End Sandstone Member of the Wadhurst Clay Formation, part of the Wealden Group, which dates to the Lower Cretaceous between 140 and 100 million years ago. It is a key site for studies of sandstone bodies in the clay formation. |
| Kingston Escarpment and Iford Hill | Iford Hill | ✓ | | 63.4 hectares (157 acres) | YES | Lewes; 50.846°N 0.024°W; TQ 392 070 | AONB | Map | Citation | These two areas of steeply sloping chalk grassland have a rich invertebrate fauna, including Adonis blue and small blue butterflies and the nationally rare and specially protected wart-biter grasshopper. The flora is also diverse with plants such as squinancywort, horseshoe vetch and eyebright. |
| Leasam Heronry Wood | Leasam Heronry Wood | ✓ | | 2.1 hectares (5.2 acres) | NO | Rye; 50.962°N 0.714°E; TQ 907 216 | | Map | Citation | This wood is not long established but it contains a nationally important heronry. The birds began to use the site in 1935 and have bred there since 1940. There are over fifty breeding pairs, around 1% of the British population. |
| Lewes Brooks | Lewes Brooks | ✓ | | 339.1 hectares (838 acres) | PP | Lewes; 50.850°N 0.017°E; TQ 421 076 | AONB NCR | Map | Citation | This site on the flood plain of the River Ouse has fields separated by ditches. Variations in salinity from brackish to spring-fed, together with periodic clearing of ditches, produce a variety of habitats. There is a diverse invertebrate fauna, especially water beetles and there are also rare snails, flies and moths. |
| Lewes Downs | Lewes Downs | ✓ | | 165.0 hectares (408 acres) | PP | Lewes; 50.871°N 0.041°E; TQ 437 099 | NCR NNR SAC SM SWT | Map | Citation | This south-facing slope on the South Downs is ecologically rich chalk grassland and scrub. Flora include the nationally rare early-spider orchid and it also has a diverse invertebrate fauna and an important breeding community of downland birds. |
| Lower Dicker | Lower Dicker | | ✓ | 0.1 hectares (0.25 acres) | NO | Hailsham; 50.878°N 0.210°E; TQ 556 111 | GCR | Map | Citation | This small disused quarry exhibits sandstone river deposits of the Weald Clay dating to the Lower Cretaceous around 130 million years ago. The mineralogy of the sandstones is important for understanding the palaeogeography of the Weald. |
| Lullington Heath | Lullington Heath | ✓ | | 72.7 hectares (180 acres) | YES | Seaford; 50.794°N 0.188°E; TQ 543 017 | NCR NNR | Map | Citation | This site has two nationally uncommon habitats, chalk heath and chalk grassland. Chalk heath formerly covered most of the site but scrub took over much of it after myxomatosis almost wiped out the rabbit population in the 1950s. The grassland is rich in flowering plants and the scrub and rough grassland provide valuable habitats for invertebrates and birds. |
| Maplehurst Wood | Maplehurst Wood | ✓ | | 31.6 hectares (78 acres) | YES | Hastings; 50.892°N 0.569°E; TQ 808 134 | | Map | Citation | This wood has probably existed since the Middle Ages and a large part of it is still semi-natural. It has a variety of woodland types and a network of rides and streams. The wood is locally important for its breeding birds such as greater spotted woodpecker, tawny owl and nuthatch. |
| Marline Valley Woods | Marline Valley Woods | ✓ | | 55.1 hectares (136 acres) | YES | St Leonards-on-Sea; 50.881°N 0.528°E; TQ 779 121 | LNR SWT | Map | Citation | This site has ancient woodland and species rich unimproved grassland. The wood has standards of pedunculate oak and coppice of hornbeam, hazel and sweet chestnut. A stream runs along a steep sided valley which has 61 species of mosses and liverworts, including some uncommon species. |
| Milton Gate Marsh | Milton Gate Marsh | ✓ | | 17.7 hectares (44 acres) | FP | Eastbourne; 50.831°N 0.181°E; TQ 537 058 | | Map | Citation | This site consists of two areas of alluvial wetland in the valleys of the River Cuckmere and one of its tributaries. There is a rich variety of invertebrates, including seventeen nationally scarce species such as the sallow clearwing moth and the beetles Ochthebius exaratus and Stenolphus skrimshiranus. |
| Northiam | Northiam | | ✓ | 0.3 hectares (0.74 acres) | NO | Rye; 50.998°N 0.605°E; TQ 829 253 | GCR | Map | Citation | This partly flooded former quarry is the type locality for the Northiam Sandstone Member of the Wadhurst Clay Formation, part of the Wealden Group which dates to the Early Cretaceous. It is important for the study of the paleogeography and paleoenvironments of the Wadhurst Clay Formation. |
| Offham Marshes | Offham Marshes | ✓ | | 39.1 hectares (97 acres) | FP | Lewes; 50.888°N 0.005°W; TQ 404 117 | | Map | Citation | Ditches in these alluvial marshes have large breeding populations of amphibian species such as common toads, smooth newts, palmate newts and common frogs. The ditches also support the hairy dragonfly and many beetles, including Britain's largest species, the rare great silver beetle. |
| Paines Cross Meadow | Paines Cross Meadow | ✓ | | 3.7 hectares (9.1 acres) | NO | Heathfield; 50.991°N 0.301°E; TQ 616 238 | | Map | Citation | This site is damp meadow on heavy clay with some areas of peat around springs. There are diverse invertebrates, including great green and dark bush-crickets and common blue and gatekeeper butterflies. |
| Park Corner Heath | Park Corner Heath | ✓ | | 2.9 hectares (7.2 acres) | YES | Lewes; 50.913°N 0.147°E; TQ 510 148 | | Map | Citation | This site has grassy heath, woodland, scrub and a pond on sand over clay. It has a diverse butterfly fauna and an outstanding variety of moths, including the sloe carpet, white-banded carpet, dotted fan-foot, straw belle and the nationally rare silky wave. |
| Penn's Rocks | Penn's Rocks | ✓ | | 10.4 hectares (26 acres) | PP | Tunbridge Wells; 51.092°N 0.171°E; TQ 521 348 | | Map | Citation | This site is a steep sided valley on sandstone with many mosses and liverworts, which is a nationally rare habitat. Uncommon species include Orthodontium gracile, Bazzania trilobata, Saccogyna viticulosa and Harpanthus scutatus. |
| Pevensey Levels | Pevensey Levels | ✓ | | 3,603.2 hectares (8,904 acres) | PP | Hailsham; 50.844°N 0.338°E; TQ 647 076 | NCR NNR Ramsar SAC SWT | Map | Citation | This is a large area of wetland grazing meadows intersected by a network of ditches. It has many nationally rare invertebrates. It may be the best site in Britain for freshwater mollusc fauna, including the endangered shining ram's-horn snail. It also has one nationally rare and several nationally scarce aquatic plants and it is of national importance for lapwing, with more than 1% of the British population. |
| Plashett Park Wood | Plashett Park Wood | ✓ | | 157.6 hectares (389 acres) | NO | Uckfield; 50.921°N 0.077°E; TQ 461 156 | | Map | Citation | This ancient wood has an extensive area of rides. There are several rare plants, such as the spiked rampion and 25 species of butterfly, including the pearl bordered fritillary, purple hairstreak and silver-washed fritillary. There are also 67 species of breeding birds. |
| River Line | River Line | | ✓ | 2.2 hectares (5.4 acres) | NO | Battle; 50.946°N 0.441°E; TQ 716 191 | GCR | Map | Citation | This site exposes a sequence of sections in the Purbeck Beds, which date to the Upper Jurassic and Lower Cretaceous periods. The sections throw light on the environment of the period and some are marine, with fossil ostracods and crustaceans. |
| Rock Wood | Rock Wood | ✓ | | 10.4 hectares (26 acres) | YES | Uckfield; 51.014°N 0.094°E; TQ 470 259 | | Map | Citation | This ancient wood has several different types of broadleaved woodland, a stream which cuts through a steep sided valley and a small waterfall. The valley has a moist and mild climate which provides a suitable habitat for mosses and liverworts which are uncommon in south-east England. |
| Rye Harbour | Rye Harbour | ✓ | ✓ | 5.6 hectares (14 acres) | YES | Rye; 50.941°N 0.754°E; TQ 936 193 | GCR | Map | Citation | No details are available for this site as its location is uncertain. The Natural England citation is for the 761 hectares (1,880 acres) Rye Harbour nature reserve, but the details page and map are for a small 5.6 hectares (14 acres) site north of the nature reserve. |
| Sapperton Meadows | Sapperton Meadows | ✓ | | 14.7 hectares (36 acres) | YES | Heathfield; 50.950°N 0.261°E; TQ 589 192 | | Map | Citation | These poorly drained hay meadows and rich pastures are managed by traditional techniques. The flora is diverse, with species such as dyer’s greenweed, lesser spearwort and fleabane. There is an extensive network of hedges which are probably old as they have many native trees and shrubs. |
| Scaynes Hill | Scaynes Hill | | ✓ | 0.04 hectares (0.099 acres) | YES | Lewes; 50.987°N 0.020°W; TQ 391 227 | GCR | Map | Citation | This disused quarry and road section exposes yellow sandstone of the Grinstead Clay, dating to the Valanginian stage around 135 million years ago. The sandstone was deposited by a meandering river. |
| Seaford to Beachy Head | Beachy Head | ✓ | ✓ | 1,108.7 hectares (2,740 acres) | PP | Eastbourne; 50.758°N 0.183°E; TV 541 976 | GCR LNR NCR SWT | Map | Citation | This site is of national importance for both its biological and geological features. Its habitats include chalk grassland, maritime grassland, chalk heath, foreshore, chalk cliffs, river meanders and greensand reef. It has nationally rare plants, invertebrates and birds. The site also exposes extensive chalk sections dating to the Late Cretaceous epoch around 80 million years ago. |
| Southerham Grey Pit | Southerham Grey Pit | | ✓ | 8.5 hectares (21 acres) | NO | Lewes; 50.862°N 0.028°E; TQ 428 089 | GCR | Map | Citation | This site exposes rocks dating to the Cenomanian stage of the Late Cretaceous, around 100 million years ago. It has preserved many fossils of inoceramid bivalves which are not found elsewhere in Britain and are important for regional correlation. It is also the last remaining source for fossil fish in the area. |
| Southerham Machine Bottom Pit | Southerham Machine Bottom Pit | | ✓ | 1.8 hectares (4.4 acres) | NO | Lewes; 50.863°N 0.033°E; TQ 432 090 | GCR | Map | Citation | This site is historically significant for the number and quality of fossils of Cretaceous fish found there by nineteenth century scholars such as Gideon Mantell. These fossils are particularly important for helping to understand the early evolution of fish groups such as the teleosts. |
| Southerham Works Pit | Southerham Works Pit | | ✓ | 1.0 hectare (2.5 acres) | PP | Lewes; 50.868°N 0.025°E; TQ 426 096 | GCR | Map | Citation | This site exposes layers of the Chalk Group dating to the Upper Cretaceous between 90 and 87 million years ago. It is a key site for understanding the lithostratigraphy of the period and the environments of its chalk sea as well as the evolution and taxonomy of Upper Cretaceous fish. |
| St Dunstan's Farm Meadows | St Dunstan's Farm Meadows | ✓ | | 10.2 hectares (25 acres) | FP | Heathfield; 50.951°N 0.286°E; TQ 607 193 | AONB | Map | Citation | This site has three unimproved meadows which are traditionally managed. They are dominated by red fescue and common bent grass and other flora include sweet vernal-grass, pignut, sheep's sorrel and field woodrush. |
| Stockland Farm Meadows | Stockland Farm Meadows | ✓ | | 5.8 hectares (14 acres) | NO | Uckfield; 51.004°N 0.175°E; TQ 527 250 | | Map | Citation | These two species rich meadows are traditionally managed. Over 80 species of flora have been recorded, including pepper-saxifrage, betony and cowslip. A small pond has five out of the six British species of amphibian. |
| Waldron Cutting | Waldron Cutting | | ✓ | 0.2 hectares (0.49 acres) | YES | Heathfield; 50.947°N 0.207°E; TQ 551 187 | GCR | Map | Citation | This site exposes siltstones and fine sandstone of the Ashdown Formation, dating to the Early Cretaceous between 140 and 100 million years ago. It has one metre long fossils of Lycopodites plants in life position. |
| Weir Wood Reservoir | Weir Wood Reservoir | ✓ | | 153.5 hectares (379 acres) | YES | East Grinstead; 51.096°N 0.011°W; TQ 394 348 | AONB LNR | Map | Citation | This is one of the largest bodies of open water in the county and it has rich and diverse communities of breeding, wintering and passage birds. Breeding birds include great crested grebe, teal, mute swan, tufted duck, little grebe, reed warbler, sedge warbler, coot and moorhen. |
| Willingdon Down | Willingdon Down | ✓ | | 67.5 hectares (167 acres) | YES | Eastbourne; 50.798°N 0.236°E; TQ 577 022 | SM | Map | Citation | This steeply sloping site on the South Downs is species-rich chalk grassland, a nationally uncommon type of habitat. The dominant grasses are sheep’s fescue and upright brome and uncommon plants include field fleawort, bee orchid, round headed rampion, green winged orchid and burnt orchid. |
| Willingford Meadows | Willingford Meadows | ✓ | | 10.5 hectares (26 acres) | FP | Etchingham; 50.976°N 0.357°E; TQ 656 223 | | Map | Citation | These species-rich meadows are traditionally managed by grazing and mowing. Grassland types range from calcareous to acid and they are the only unimproved pastures on Jurassic limestone in the county. There is also a stream, a marsh, an area of overgrown hornbeam coppice and a mature hazel and hawthorn hedge. |
| Wilmington Downs | Wilmington Downs | ✓ | | 209.8 hectares (518 acres) | PP | Polegate; 50.806°N 0.190°E; TQ 544 030 | SM | Map | Citation | This site is mainly chalk grassland on the steep slope of the South Downs. It is important for invertebrates, including two protected under Schedule 5 of the Wildlife and Countryside Act, 1981, the wart-biter grasshopper and the snail Monacha cartusiana. There are also several unusual species of lichens and mosses. |
| Winchelsea Cutting | Winchelsea Cutting | | ✓ | 0.1 hectares (0.25 acres) | YES | Winchelsea; 50.920°N 0.705°E; TQ 902 169 | GCR | Map | Citation | This site exposes the top two metres of the Ashdown Sand Formation and the bottom four metres of the Wadhurst Clay Formation, dating to the Wealden Group of the Lower Cretaceous around 140 million years ago. |

== See also ==
- List of Local Nature Reserves in East Sussex
- Sussex Wildlife Trust

== Sources ==
- Ratcliffe, Derek, ed. (1977). A Nature Conservation Review. Vol. 2. Cambridge, UK: Cambridge University Press. ISBN 978-0-521-21403-2.
