= List of civil parishes in East Sussex =

This is a list of civil parishes in the ceremonial county of East Sussex, England. There are 105 civil parishes.

Population figures are unavailable for some of the smallest parishes and those created after 2011.

The districts of Eastbourne, Hastings and most of Brighton and Hove are unparished. This corresponds to the former districts of Eastbourne County Borough, Hastings County Borough, Hove Municipal Borough, Portslade by Sea Urban District and part of the former Brighton County Borough.

Civil Parish	Civil Parish Population 2011	Area (km^{2}) 2011	Pre 1974 District	District
Alciston			Hailsham Rural District	Wealden
Alfriston	829	9.36	Hailsham Rural District	Wealden
Arlington	770	18.35	Hailsham Rural District	Wealden
Ashburnham	397	22.39	Battle Rural District	Rother
Barcombe	1,473	17.80	Chailey Rural District	Lewes
Battle (town)	6,673	31.81	Battle Rural District	Rother
Beckley	1,037	22.74	Battle Rural District	Rother
Beddingham	242	15.71	Chailey Rural District	Lewes
Berwick	380	12.05	Hailsham Rural District	Wealden
Bexhill-on-Sea			Bexhill Municipal Borough	Rother
Bodiam	393	6.49	Battle Rural District	Rother
Brede	1,763	17.61	Battle Rural District	Rother
Brightling	371	19.84	Battle Rural District	Rother
Burwash	2,713	30.13	Battle Rural District	Rother
Buxted	3,343	21.63	Uckfield Rural District	Wealden
Camber	1,265	14.05	Battle Rural District	Rother
Catsfield	891	12.21	Battle Rural District	Rother
Chailey	3,088	24.91	Chailey Rural District	Lewes
Chalvington with Ripe	953	11.13	Hailsham Rural District	Wealden
Chiddingly	1,021	17.62	Hailsham Rural District	Wealden
Crowborough (town)	20,951	13.59	Uckfield Rural District	Wealden
Crowhurst	891	10.14	Battle Rural District	Rother
Cuckmere Valley	191	17.63	Hailsham Rural District	Wealden
Dallington	292	7.86	Battle Rural District	Rother
Danehill	1,957	22.65	Uckfield Rural District	Wealden
Ditchling	2,081	15.50	Chailey Rural District	Lewes
East Chiltington	474	13.59	Chailey Rural District	Lewes
East Dean and Friston	1,620	8.60	Hailsham Rural District	Wealden
East Guldeford			Battle Rural District	Rother
East Hoathly with Halland	1,600	15.13	Hailsham Rural District	Wealden
Etchingham	806	13.38	Battle Rural District	Rother
Ewhurst	1,130	23.63	Battle Rural District	Rother
Fairlight	1,670	6.13	Battle Rural District	Rother
Falmer	284	17.01	Chailey Rural District	Lewes
Firle	293	13.86	Chailey Rural District	Lewes
Fletching	1,064	25.74	Uckfield Rural District	Wealden
Forest Row	4,954	32.52	Uckfield Rural District	Wealden
Framfield	1,983	19.75	Uckfield Rural District	Wealden
Frant	1,645	31.93	Uckfield Rural District	Wealden
Glynde	249	9.72	Chailey Rural District	Lewes
Guestling	1,432	15.93	Battle Rural District	Rother
Hadlow Down	857	16.97	Uckfield Rural District	Wealden
Hailsham (town)	20,436	19.37	Hailsham Rural District	Wealden
Hamsey	632	11.44	Chailey Rural District	Lewes
Hartfield	2,179	42.02	Uckfield Rural District	Wealden
Heathfield and Waldron	11,913	48.08	Hailsham Rural District	Wealden
Hellingly	1,820	19.59	Hailsham Rural District	Wealden
Herstmonceux	2,613	24.65	Hailsham Rural District	Wealden
Hooe	445	10.01	Hailsham Rural District	Wealden
Horam	2,642	10.39	Hailsham Rural District	Wealden
Hurst Green	1,481	10.36	Battle Rural District	Rother
Icklesham	2,751	23.53	Battle Rural District	Rother
Iden	456	12.02	Battle Rural District	Rother
Iford	209	9.70	Chailey Rural District	Lewes
Isfield	574	7.66	Uckfield Rural District	Wealden
Kingston near Lewes	831	5.70	Chailey Rural District	Lewes
Laughton	599	19.01	Hailsham Rural District	Wealden
Lewes (town)	17,297	11.41	Lewes Municipal Borough	Lewes
Little Horsted	233	10.67	Uckfield Rural District	Wealden
Long Man	447	16.12	Hailsham Rural District	Wealden
Maresfield	3,636	26.28	Uckfield Rural District	Wealden
Mayfield and Five Ashes	3,718	47.16	Uckfield Rural District	Wealden
Mountfield	616	15.26	Battle Rural District	Rother
Newhaven (town)	12,232	7.18	Newhaven Urban District	Lewes
Newick	2,457	7.80	Chailey Rural District	Lewes
Ninfield	1,562	10.60	Hailsham Rural District	Wealden
Northiam	2,083	14.50	Battle Rural District	Rother
Peacehaven (town)	14,067	5.19	Chailey Rural District	Lewes
Peasmarsh	1,191	15.81	Battle Rural District	Rother
Penhurst			Battle Rural District	Rother
Pett	846	6.51	Battle Rural District	Rother
Pevensey	3,153	17.61	Hailsham Rural District	Wealden
Piddinghoe	255	3.80	Chailey Rural District	Lewes
Playden	340	16.57	Battle Rural District	Rother
Plumpton	1,644	9.66	Chailey Rural District	Lewes
Polegate (town)	7,655	7.04	Hailsham Rural District	Wealden
Ringmer	4,648	25.90	Chailey Rural District	Lewes
Rodmell	527	11.26	Chailey Rural District	Lewes
Rotherfield	3,208	46.09	Uckfield Rural District	Wealden
Rottingdean	3,229	4.12	Brighton County Borough	Brighton and Hove
Rye Foreign	335	3.86	Battle Rural District	Rother
Rye (town)	4,255	4.14	Rye Municipal Borough	Rother
Salehurst and Robertsbridge	2,728	18.14	Battle Rural District	Rother
Seaford (town)	23,571	17.27	Seaford Urban District	Lewes
Sedlescombe	1,476	12.64	Battle Rural District	Rother
Selmeston	159	6.73	Hailsham Rural District	Wealden
South Heighton	990	8.49	Chailey Rural District	Lewes
Southease			Chailey Rural District	Lewes
St Ann Without			Chailey Rural District	Lewes
St John Without			Chailey Rural District	Lewes
Streat	158	5.18	Chailey Rural District	Lewes
Tarring Neville			Chailey Rural District	Lewes
Telscombe (town)	7,477	4.73	Chailey Rural District	Lewes
Ticehurst	3,873	32.52	Battle Rural District	Rother
Uckfield (town)	14,493	7.43	Uckfield Rural District	Wealden
Udimore	369	11.71	Battle Rural District	Rother
Wadhurst	4,883	40.14	Uckfield Rural District	Wealden
Warbleton	1,375	29.11	Hailsham Rural District	Wealden
Wartling	446	11.07	Hailsham Rural District	Wealden
Westfield	2,583	19.12	Battle Rural District	Rother
Westham	6,314	14.15	Hailsham Rural District	Wealden
Westmeston	343	8.48	Chailey Rural District	Lewes
Whatlington	374	6.04	Battle Rural District	Rother
Willingdon and Jevington	7,440	10.77	Hailsham Rural District	Wealden
Withyham	2,854	36.77	Uckfield Rural District	Wealden
Wivelsfield	1,980	10.79	Chailey Rural District	Lewes

== See also ==
- List of civil parishes in England
