= Milton Gate Marsh =

Wetland in East Sussex, England

Coordinates: 50.831°N 0.181°E

- Site of Special Scientific Interest
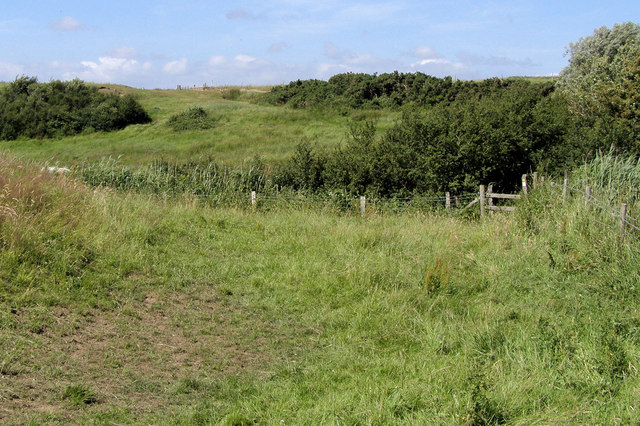
- Location of Milton Gate Marsh.
- Area of search: East Sussex
- Grid reference: TQ 537 058
- Interest: Biological
- Area: 17.7 hectares (44 acres)
- Notification date: 1992
- Location map: Magic Map

Milton Gate Marsh is a 17.7-hectare (44-acre) biological Site of Special Scientific Interest north-west of Eastbourne in East Sussex.

This site consists of two areas of alluvial wetland in the valleys of the River Cuckmere and one of its tributaries. There is a rich variety of invertebrates, including seventeen nationally scarce species such as the sallow clearwing moth and the beetles Ochthebius exaratus and Stenolphus skrimshiranus.
