= Rye Foreign =

Hamlet near Rye, Sussex, England

Coordinates: 50.97°N 0.71°E

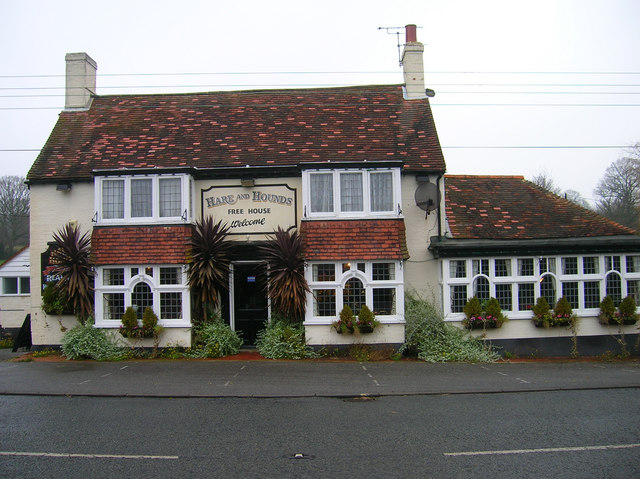

- Location within East Sussex
- Area: 3.9 km^{2} (1.5 sq mi)
- Population: 335 (Parish-2011)
  - Density: 238/sq mi (92/km^{2})
- OS grid reference: TQ900225
  - London: 51 miles (82 km) NW
- Civil parish: Rye Foreign
- District: Rother
- Shire county: East Sussex
- Region: South East
- Country: England
- Sovereign state: United Kingdom
- Post town: RYE
- Postcode district: TN31
- Dialling code: 01797
- Police: Sussex
- Fire: East Sussex
- Ambulance: South East Coast
- UK Parliament: Hastings and Rye

Rye Foreign is a small hamlet and civil parish in the Rother district of East Sussex, England. The hamlet is about 2 miles (or 3 km) north-west of Rye, immediately to the east of the larger village of Peasmarsh. The name of the parish came about in 1247, when King Henry III reassumed control of Rye and Winchelsea from the Abbey of Fecamp, but left part of the area still under the Abbey: hence "Rye Foreign". There is no parish church, although the building still stands in secular use.

The parish also includes Bowler's Town and Springfield.

The parish was formed in 1894 from the part of the ancient parish of Rye outside the borough of Rye. From 1894 to 1934 it was part of the rural district of Hastings. From 1934 to 1974 it was in the Battle Rural District.

The local inns are the Royal Oak and the Hare and Hounds.

== Landmarks ==
The Site of Special Scientific Interest Leasam Heronry Wood is to be found within the parish. The site is a nationally important heronry with around fifty pairs breeding here.
