= Westfield, East Sussex =

Village in East Sussex, England

Coordinates: 50.91°N 0.58°E

Westfield
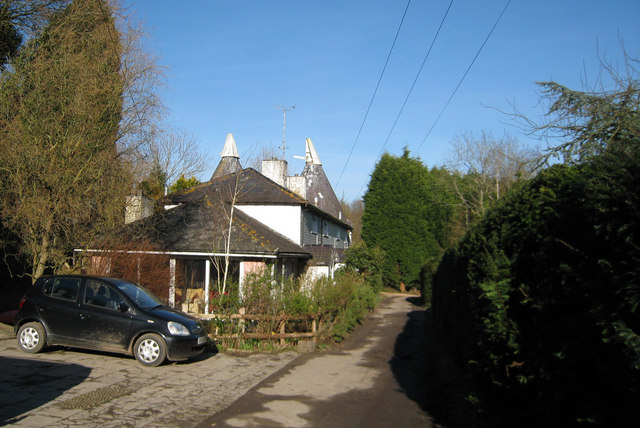

- Location within East Sussex
- Area: 19.1 km^{2} (7.4 sq mi)
- Population: 2,583 (Parish-2011)
  - Density: 355/sq mi (137/km^{2})
- OS grid reference: TQ811154
  - London: 51 miles (82 km) NW
- District: Rother
- Shire county: East Sussex
- Region: South East
- Country: England
- Sovereign state: United Kingdom
- Post town: HASTINGS
- Postcode district: TN35
- Dialling code: 01424
- Police: Sussex
- Fire: East Sussex
- Ambulance: South East Coast
- UK Parliament: Hastings and Rye

Westfield is a village and civil parish in the Rother district of East Sussex. It is one of the largest villages in the area with a population of 2,819. The village lies five miles (8 km) north of Hastings. It was known as Westewelle in the Domesday survey. It is located on the A28 road which runs from Hastings to Ashford and beyond.

The parish includes the linear hamlet of Kent Street along the A21 road. This spans 800 yards from Carpenter's Barn Farm at the southern end past Claverton Country House Hotel up to Sedlescombe Golf Club at the northern end.

A prominent sight when entering the village from the south is the church dedicated to St. John the Baptist. Its many features include extensive buttressing, a 12th-century porch and a 14th-century font with an elaborate 17th-century cover. Above the door to the tower there is carved a Royal Coat of Arms with the list of vicars since 1250 set below. Looking towards the nave, there is a Norman arch with squint windows to the side, cut through the 32 inches of stone. Another feature at the road entrance is the lychgate, with its four carved angels; this was added in 1887. The history of Westfield has been extensively researched by a resident of Westfield descended from a family who appear in the records from 1552. Westfield Football Club play in the Sussex County League Division Two.

== Landmarks ==
The parish contains a Site of Special Scientific Interest—Maplehurst Wood. This is a 78 acres (32 ha) ancient woodland containing a range of flora and avian fauna. The village has significant areas of verge, which is purposely left wild in order to preserve nature - this is most notable on approach to the village on the A28, alongside Hole Farm. The woods mentioned is the only East Sussex site for Herb Paris (Paris quadrifolia).

== Sport and leisure ==
Westfield has a Non-League football club Westfield F.C., who play at The Parish Field. There is now a new football field and clubhouse plus houses in a new area East of Mill Lane. There is a small recreation area in the field opposite the church for the children of the parish. The village has one public house, The New Inn.

The local primary school has a hall attached to it, which can be used by the community. There are two village halls, one attached to the Church, and one, the newest, attached to the school. Many activities take place there, including two horticultural shows every year, put on by Westfield Horticultural Society, that has existed since around 1890.
