= Fore Wood =

Protected area in East Sussex, England

Coordinates: 50.888°N 0.491°E

- Site of Special Scientific Interest
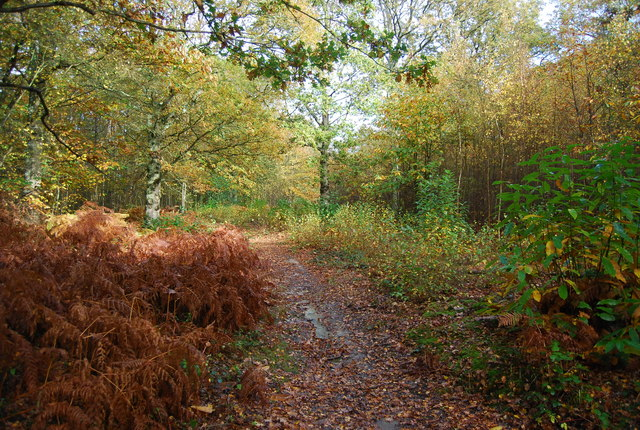
- Location of Fore Wood.
- Area of search: East Sussex
- Grid reference: TQ 753 128
- Interest: Biological
- Area: 20.9 hectares (52 acres)
- Notification date: 1984
- Location map: Magic Map

Fore Wood is a 20.9-hectare (52-acre) biological Site of Special Scientific Interest north-west of Hastings in East Sussex. It is part of the Royal Society for the Protection of Birds nature reserve of the same name, and the land designated as Fore Wood SSSI is entirely owned by the Royal Society for the Protection of Birds.

The woodland in this steep valley is variable and it has been considerably modified in some areas. Flora include hay-scented buckler-fern, greater wood-rush and hard fern, as well as three rare mosses. There is also a rich community of breeding birds.
