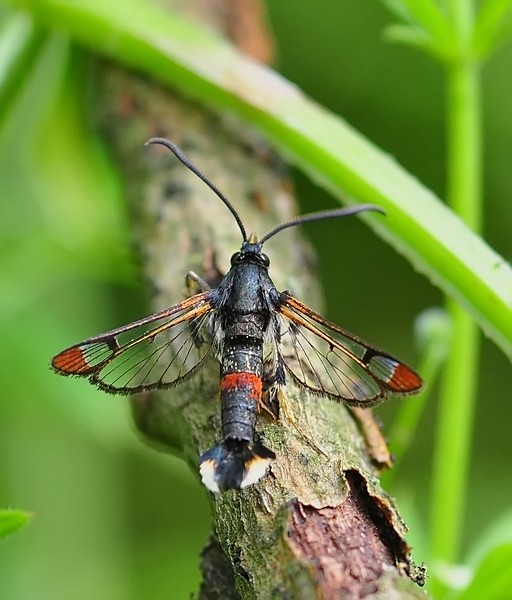

Scientific classification
- Kingdom: Animalia
- Phylum: Arthropoda
- Clade: Pancrustacea
- Class: Insecta
- Order: Lepidoptera
- Family: Sesiidae
- Genus: Synanthedon
- Species: S. formicaeformis

Binomial name
- Synanthedon formicaeformis (Esper, 1783)

Synonyms
- Sesia formiciformis Staudinger, 1856; Sphinx tenthrediniformis Esper, 1782 (nec Sphinx tenthrediniformis [Denis & Schiffermüller] 1775]); Sphinx nomadaeformis Hübner, [1803-1806] (nec Sesia nomadaeformis Laspeyres 1801); Synanthedon formicaeformis f. duplex Schnaider, 1942; Synanthedon herzi Špatenka & Gorbunov, 1992; Sesia formicaeformis ab. uniformis Marquardt, 1959 (nec Sesia uniformis Snellen 1900); Sesia flammeus Haworth, 1802 (nomen nudum)

= Synanthedon formicaeformis =

Species of moth

Synanthedon formicaeformis, the red-tipped clearwing, is a moth of the family Sesiidae and can be found in all of Europe, the eastern Palearctic realm, and the Near East. The larvae sometimes form pear-shaped galls on willows (Salix spp). It was first described by Eugenius Johann Christoph Esper in 1783.

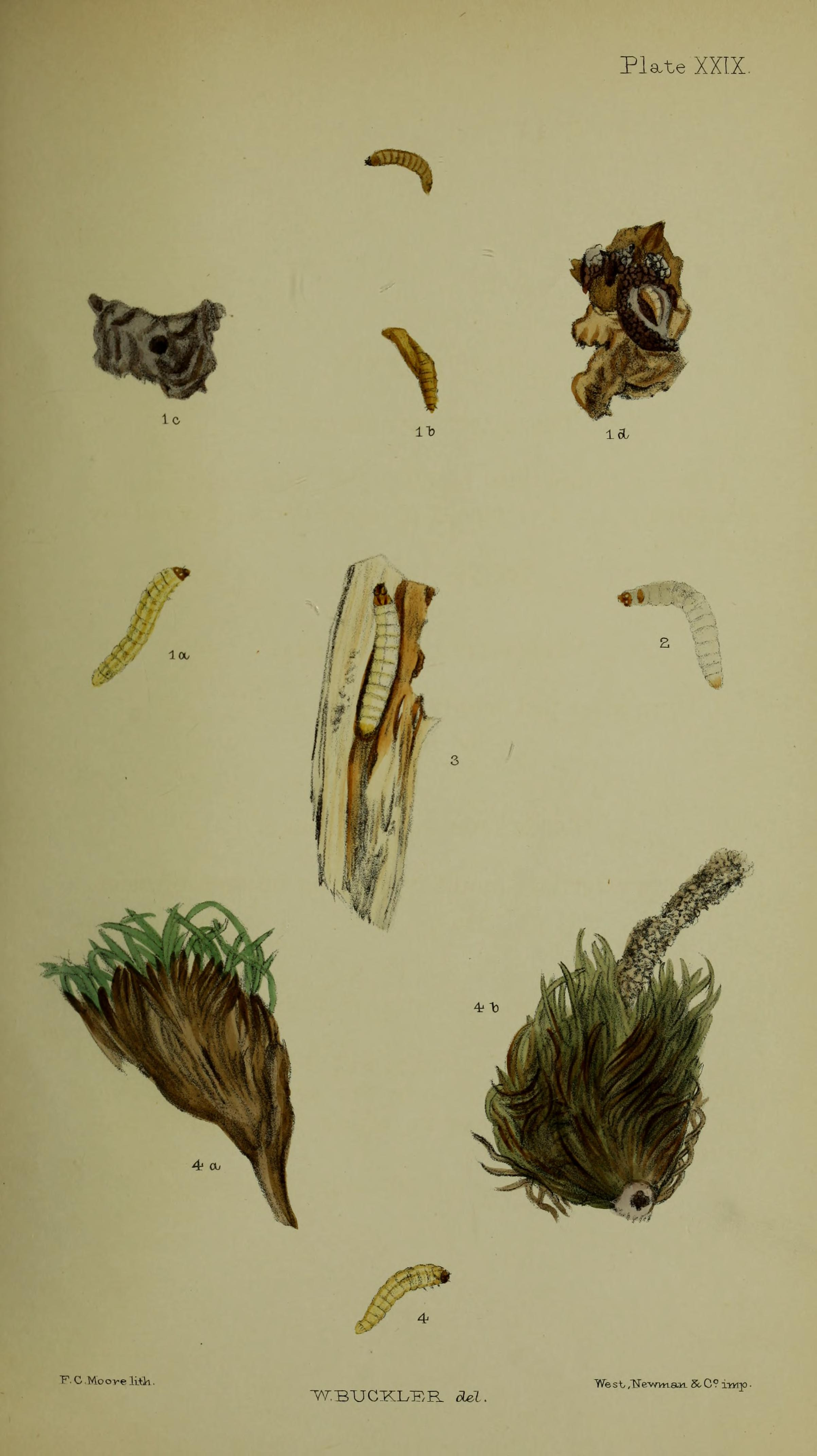
Fig.3 larva after last moult burrowing in stem of osier

== Description ==
The eggs are laid in axils, bark crevices or stump edges of Salix species from the end of May to late-July.

The larvae feed inside the stems of various Salix species, including Salix viminalis. According to Heath and Emmet (1985) the larvae give little external sign apart from a slight browning, and at the edge of a broken stem frass may be seen. The larvae feed between the wood and the bark and can be found in their tunnels when the bark is peeled back. When there are galls they can be pear-shaped, or a ″peculiar shape″ with the ″diameter of the stem above the gall greater than that below, which continues for some distance″. Galls can be similar to the sallow clearwing (Synanthedon flaviventris).

The pupa is 12–14 mm long and does not make a cocoon. The emergence holes have a diameter of circa 2.5 mm and before pupation can be hidden by a thin cap. The exuviae can remain protruding from the emergence holes for some time.

The wingspan is 17–19 mm. Adults have clear wings, which are covered in scales only on the wing veins, the discal area and the wing edges.

The forewings are reddish coloured on the edges. The fringes are brownish. The discal stain is crescent-shaped, olive or reddish brown and extends from the front to the back edge. The hindwings have a narrow dark edge, as well as a small black-brown discal stain. The antennae, head, thorax and abdomen shine blue black. A red ring is located respectively on the fourth and fifth segment of the abdomen. Sometimes, also the sixth segment is reddish in colour. The hind tufts are strongly fan shaped, blue-black in colour, clear yellowish white on the sides. There is a certain similarity to Pyropteron chrysidiformis.

Adults are on wing from May to July, at higher elevations until August. They are particularly active in the sunshine and visit the flowers of different plants, such as those of elderberry Sambucus nigra, Origanum vulgare, Jacobaea vulgaris, Ligustrum vulgare and Rubus idaeus.

== Gallery ==
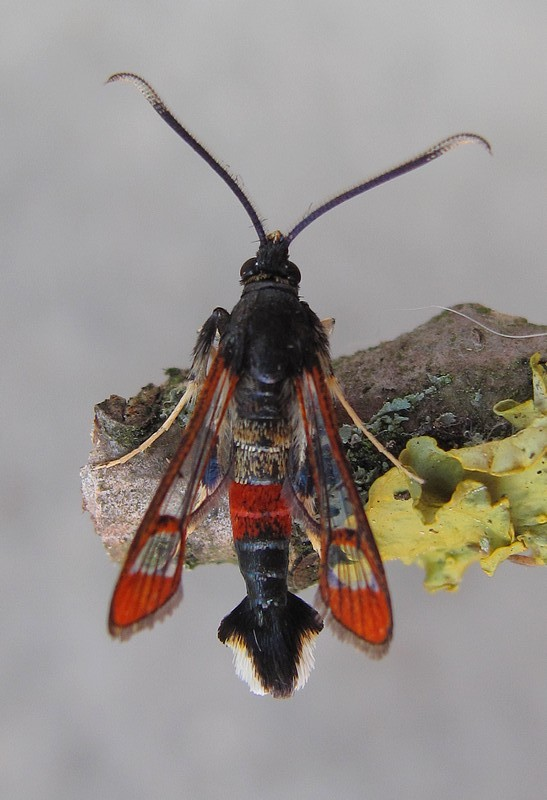
