= Willingdon and Jevington =

Civil parish in East Sussex, England

Coordinates: 50.80°N 0.26°E

- Red Lion, Willingdon

- Location within East Sussex
- Area: 10.6 km^{2} (4.1 sq mi)
- Population: 7,440 (2011)
  - Density: 1,511/sq mi (583/km^{2})
- OS grid reference: TQ590024
  - London: 51 miles (82 km) NNW
- Civil parish: Willingdon and Jevington
- District: Wealden
- Shire county: East Sussex
- Region: South East
- Country: England
- Sovereign state: United Kingdom
- Post town: EASTBOURNE
- Postcode district: BN20, BN22
- Post town: POLEGATE
- Postcode district: BN26
- Dialling code: 01323
- Police: Sussex
- Fire: East Sussex
- Ambulance: South East Coast
- UK Parliament: Lewes
- Website: Parish Council

Willingdon and Jevington is a civil parish in the Wealden District of East Sussex, England. The two villages lie one mile (1.6 km) south of Polegate. Willingdon is part of the built-up area which is Eastbourne, and lies on the main A22 road, whilst Jevington is on a minor road leading to Friston. In 2011 the parish had a population of 7440. The civil parish was formed on 1 April 1999 from "Jevington" and "Willingdon" parishes. Under the name of Willingdon it is also an electoral ward.

== The villages ==
=== Willingdon ===
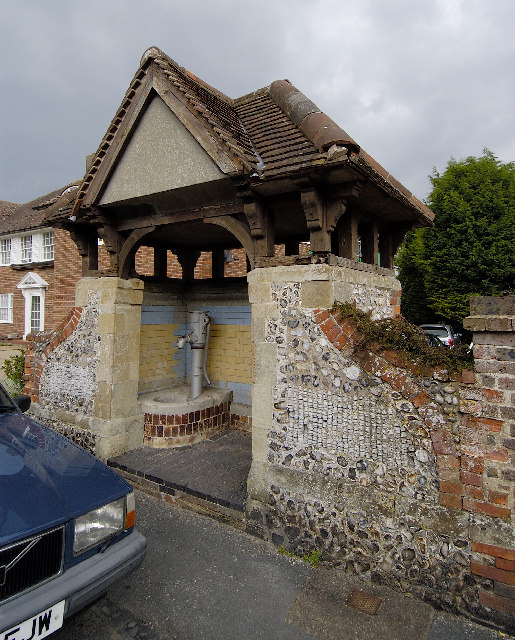
Village pump, Upper Willingdon

Willingdon is two villages, Upper and Lower Willingdon. The ancient ecclesiastical parish of Willingdon stretched across the north of the town of Eastbourne, reaching the English Channel at Langney Point. The original part of the village is located around the present day ‘Church Street’ and ‘Wish Hill’, as shown on an old map of the area. The old parish of Willingdon included Hampden Park, now also part of the Eastbourne area. See map here:

Willingdon is the name of the village in George Orwell's Animal Farm and the pub in the book is also The Red Lion.

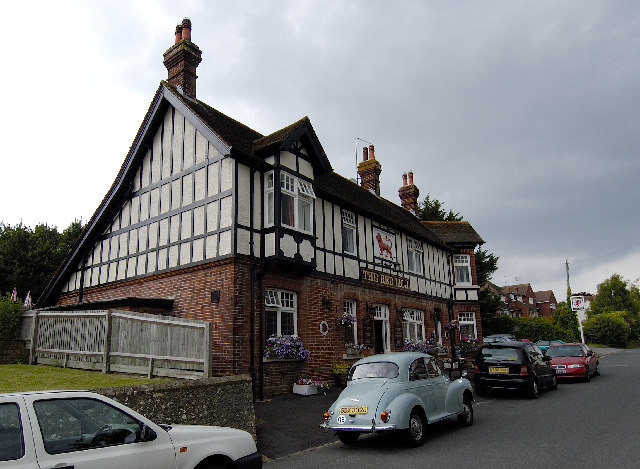
Red Lion pub, Upper Willingdon village

=== Jevington ===
Jevington lies on a minor road between Polegate and Friston. The Jevington Church of England parish church is dedicated to St Andrew and is a Grade I listed building. It contains Saxon elements (including a tower) as well as many other medieval architectural features, including a 14th-century font. A rare elm cultivar 'Serpentina' grows in the grounds. The parish takes in the hamlet of Filching and also Wannock.

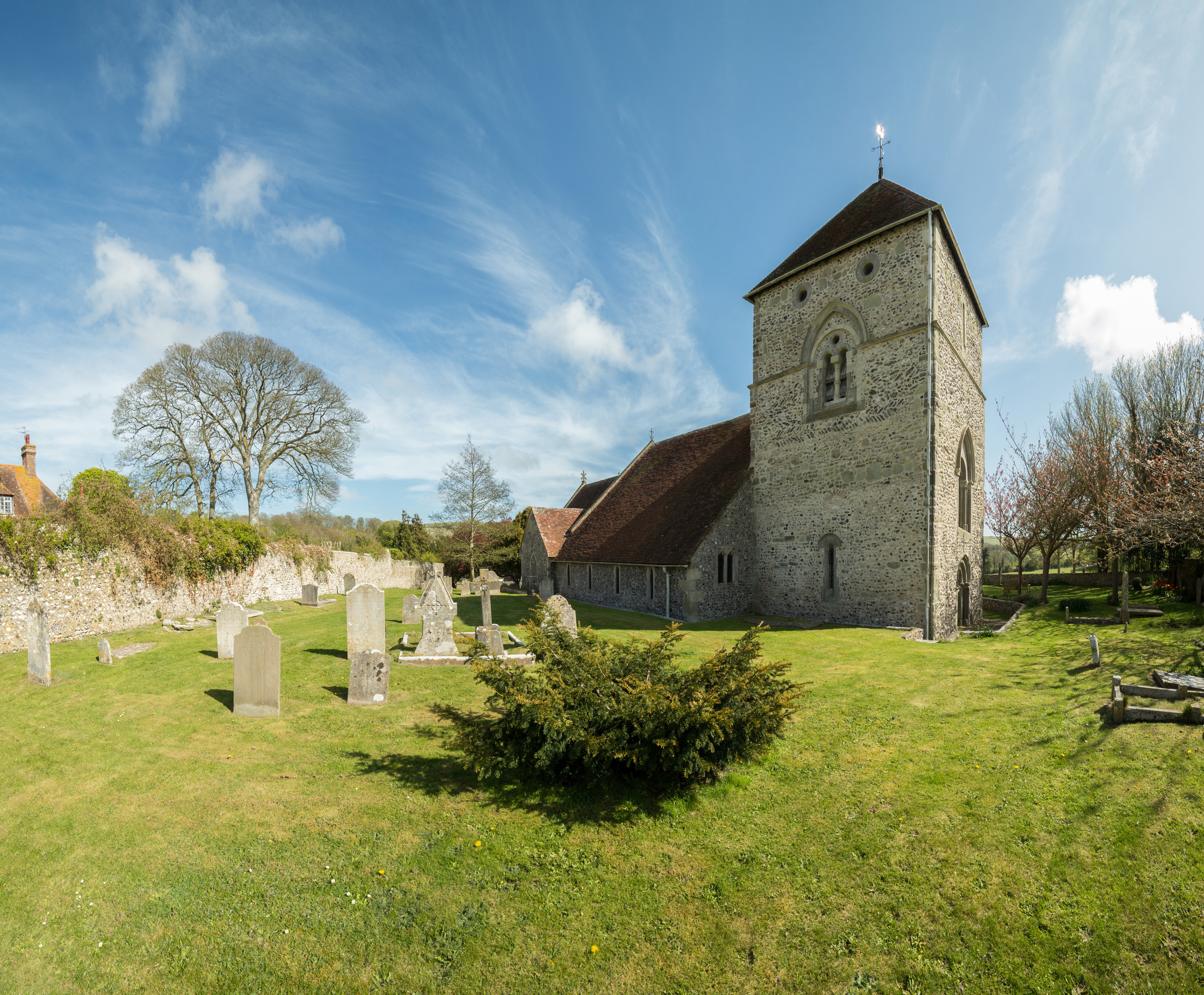
St Andrew's Church, Jevington

Jevington is a former estate village owned in the 19th century by the Duke of Devonshire who used part of it as a training centre for his race-horses. In 1896 he sold the estate village and 1,000 acre farm to Charlie Wood, one of the premier jockeys of the late-Victorian period who continued to train horses on the Sussex Downs until 1919. Race horse training continues at Jevington in the early 21st century containing the yard of trainer Anna Newton-Smith.

The village currently contains a 400-year-old pub called the Eight Bells. In the 1970s a local restaurant claimed to be the originator of banoffee pie. Credit for the pie's invention was claimed by Nigel Mackenzie and Ian Dowding, owner and head chef, respectively of the former Hungry Monk Restaurant They claimed to have created the dessert in 1972, basing it on a San Francisco recipe for "Blum's Coffee Toffee Pie" The restaurant closed in 2012 with the building now forming the Hungry Monk cottages.

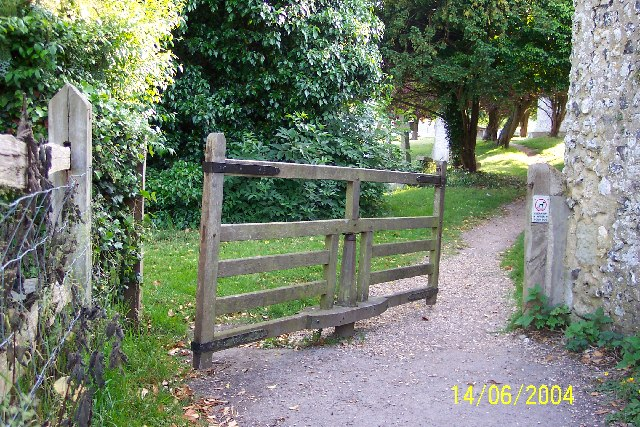
Tapsel gate in the churchyard of St Andrew's Church, Jevington

=== Wannock ===
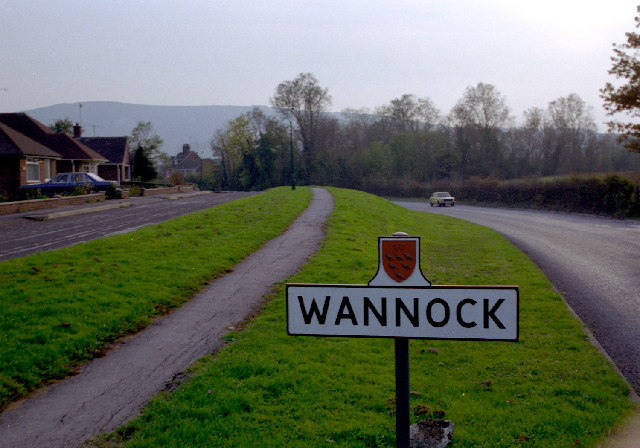
Wannock sign. The road approaching Wannock from the direction of Polegate

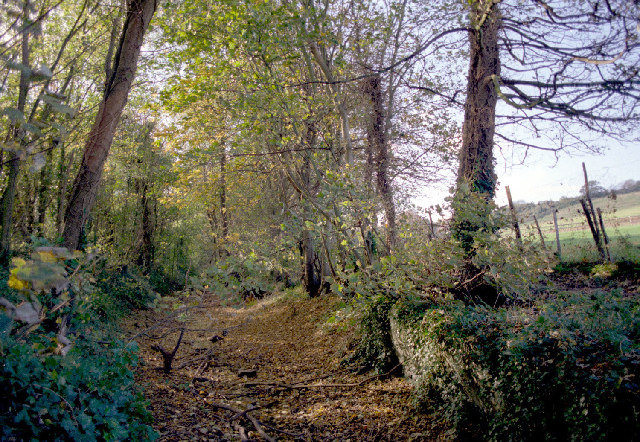
Wannock Glen footpath

Wannock below the South Downs between the villages of Polegate and Jevington. It has a village hall, but no church, pub or shops. It has 300 suburban homes, mainly bungalows housing elderly residents. There were once two tea gardens in Wannock which were popular with coach parties visiting from nearby Eastbourne. A dance hall stood on stilts over the local beauty spot of Wannock Glen. Wannock may be a Saxon place name; according to one source, Wannock supposedly contains the element "Wan" from "Woden" Wannock is mentioned in the Domesday Book (1086) and in a Napoleonic assessment/inventory of the British south coast defences. There is a manor Wannock Place, two medieval cottages and a cottage which was a watermill. One medieval cottage is called "Stream Cottage", the other medieval cottage is owned by Nigel Waterson, former local MP. The area was once known for its walnut groves and some house gardens still contain walnut trees.

=== Filching ===
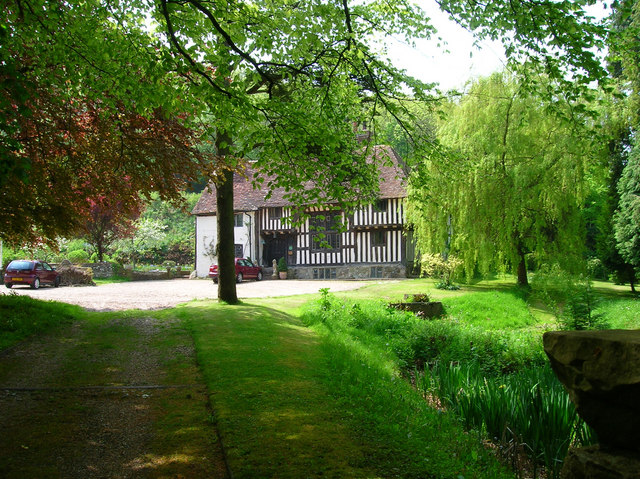
Filching Manor

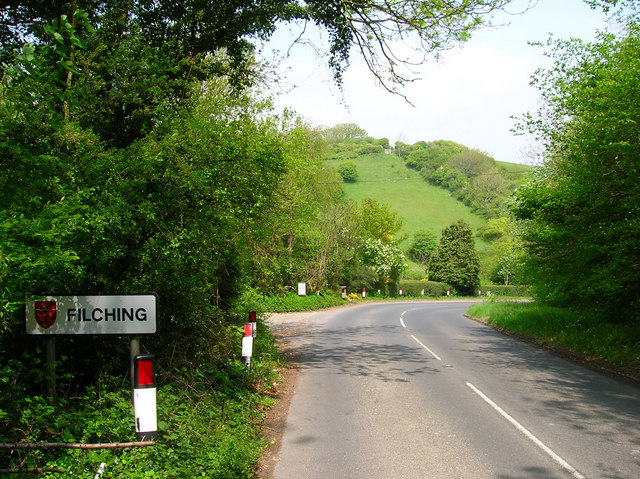
Filching sign as seen approaching the hamlet from Jevington

Filching lies at the other end of the Wannock Glen from Wannock along the Polegate to Friston road. It consists of a few houses, Gibby's Tea Gardens, a chalk quarry and a medieval manor house. Filching Manor was built around 1450.

Filching Manor Motor Museum is the home of Blue Bird K3, the last remaining intact Bluebird boat – a Rolls-Royce engined speedboat driven by Sir Malcolm Campbell to take the World Water Speed Record in 1937. This is the only world record boat surviving intact. A long term restoration project is ongoing. The museum also has Bluebird Electric 2 vehicle on display.

Filching Manor is also the site of the annual Jevington Fête, and it houses a public karting track (the Campbell Circuit) in the grounds for arrive-and-drive sessions, and other race events.

== Landmarks ==
The parish contains Folkington Reservoir, a Site of Special Scientific Interest (SSSI), although the village of Folkington lies in the neighbouring Long Man parish. Folkington Reservoir is a covered reservoir built within the chalk of the South Downs. Its surrounding area contains a diverse chalk flora including the protected hairy mallow Althaea hirsuta.

== Other notes ==
The Polegate Airship Station was in the parish between July 1915 and April 1919.

The Labour cabinet minister George Brown lived in the area and when elevated to the peerage became Lord George-Brown of Jevington.

== See also ==
- The Hoo, Willingdon and Jevington
- Willingdon Down, a 67.5-hectare Site of Special Scientific Interest
