= Little Horsted =

Village in East Sussex, England

Coordinates: 50.95°N 0.09°E

- Location within East Sussex
- Area: 10.7 km^{2} (4.1 sq mi)
- Population: 233 (2011)
  - Density: 41/sq mi (16/km^{2})
- OS grid reference: TQ469183
  - London: 39 miles (63 km) NNW
- Civil parish: Little Horsted
- District: Wealden
- Shire county: East Sussex
- Region: South East
- Country: England
- Sovereign state: United Kingdom
- Post town: UCKFIELD
- Postcode district: TN22
- Dialling code: 01825
- Police: Sussex
- Fire: East Sussex
- Ambulance: South East Coast
- UK Parliament: Wealden

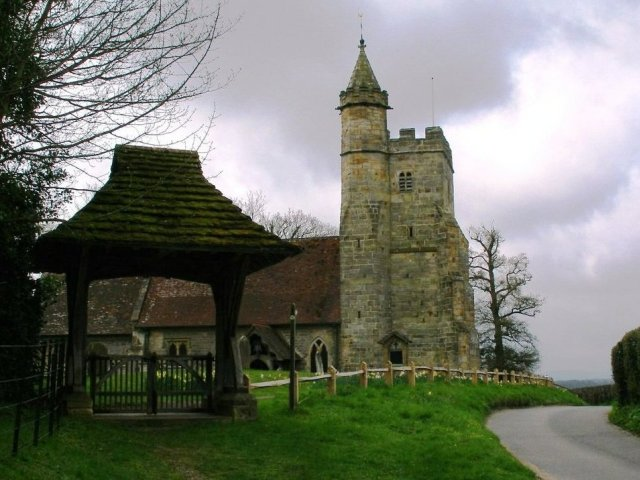
Little Horsted Church

Little Horsted (also known as Horsted Parva) is a village and civil parish in the Wealden district of East Sussex, England. It is located two miles (3.2 km) south of Uckfield, on the A26 road.

The village is recorded in the Domesday Book of 1086. The church is dedicated to St Michael and All Angels. Horsted Place, now a country hotel, is located in the village, together with two golf courses, including the East Sussex National.

== History ==
Among the prime movers of the early Wealden iron industry were the Levett family. The family's iron interests were begun by John Levett of Little Horsted. On Levett's early death, his share of the family's interests in the emerging iron industry of the Weald went to his brother, an Oxford-trained rector in Buxted. William Levett took to his unlikely role and became the leading armaments supplier to the King. In his will of 1533, John Levett left his iron mills and furnaces to his brother, with the provision that his children be cared for with the proceeds. Levett's widow Eve Adam remarried Laurence Ashburnham, ancestor of the Ashburnham baronets of Broomham, Sussex.

== Landmarks ==
Within the parish is the Bentley Wildfowl and Motor Museum.

There is a Site of Special Scientific Interest partly within the parish. Plashett Park Wood is a site of biological importance as an area of ancient woodland. It provides a habitat for a variety of breeding birds plus a number of rarer invertebrates and flora.
