= Playden =

Village and parish in East Sussex, England

Coordinates: 50.97°N 0.74°E

- Location within East Sussex
- Area: 16.6 km^{2} (6.4 sq mi) -inc East Guldeford
- Population: 340 (Parish-2011)
  - Density: 51/sq mi (20/km^{2})
- OS grid reference: TQ925226
  - London: 52 miles (84 km) NW
- Civil parish: Playden
- District: Rother
- Shire county: East Sussex
- Region: South East
- Country: England
- Sovereign state: United Kingdom
- Post town: RYE
- Postcode district: TN31
- Dialling code: 01797
- Police: Sussex
- Fire: East Sussex
- Ambulance: South East Coast
- UK Parliament: Hastings and Rye

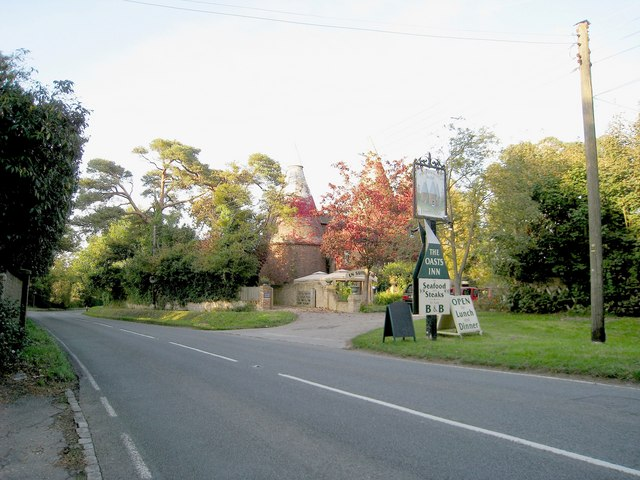
Playden Oasts Hotel, Playden

Playden is a village and civil parish in the Rother district of East Sussex, England. The village is located one mile (1.6 km) north of Rye.

== History ==
Playden is mentioned in the Domesday Book of 1086 as Pleidena, having 37 households, ploughlands and a church. It is a largely rural parish, having no village centre, and the hamlet of Houghton Green is included in the parish. Playden's main occupation was fishing: the fish were salted in a one-time settlement known as Saltcote, after the fact that it had a fish salting industry based there. Saltcote Street is now all that remains of that industry.

== Governance ==
Playden Parish Council has four councillors, and meets monthly at the WI Hall in the village.

The parish is within the Rother District of East Sussex. In the United Kingdom Parliament, it is part of the Hastings & Rye constituency, represented since the 2019 UK general election by Sally-Ann Hart, of the Conservative party.

== Landmarks ==
The Norman church is dedicated to St Michael. It was begun in 1190, and contains a ladder to the bell tower dated 1686.

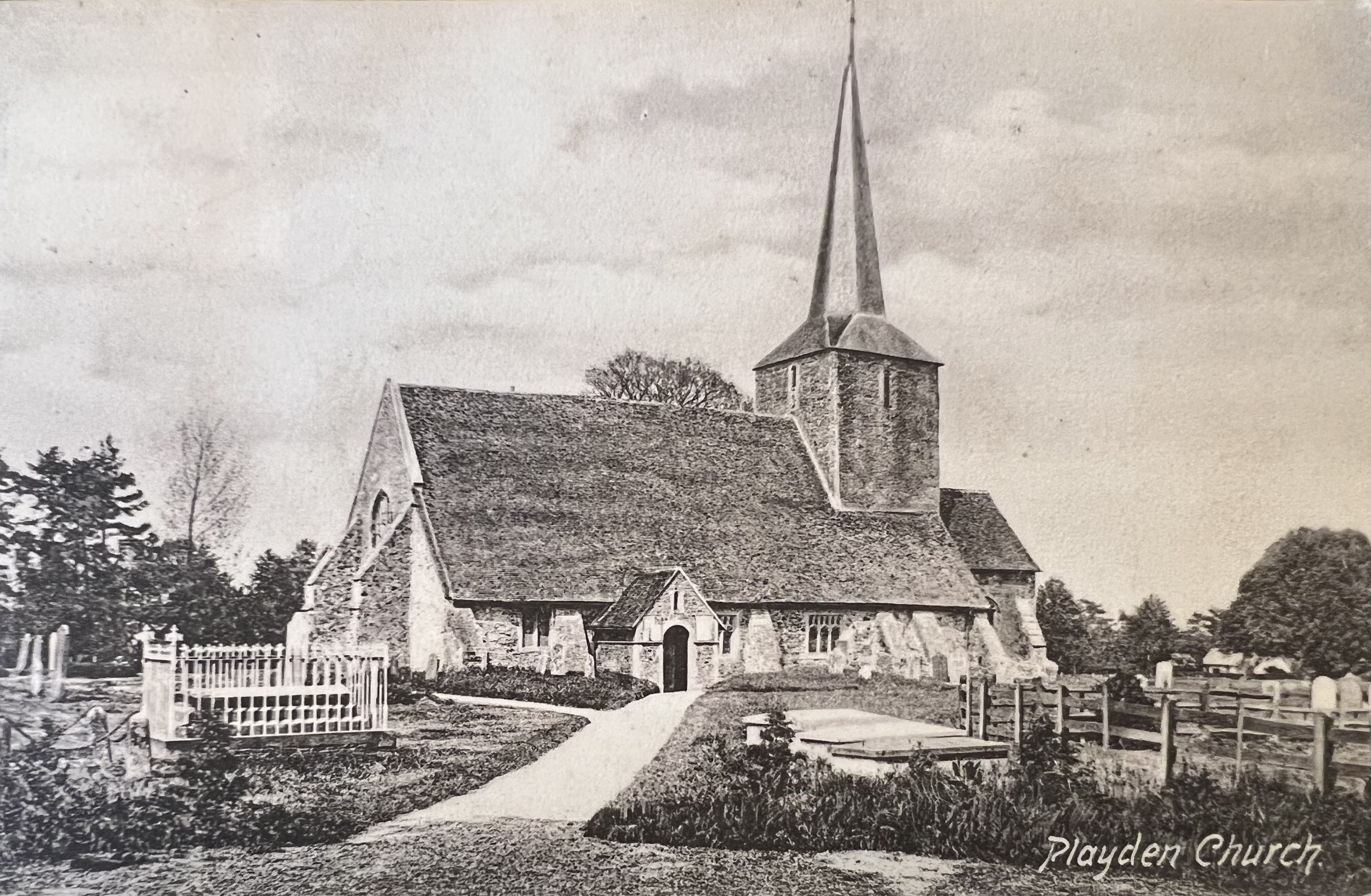
The parish church, as depicted in a postcard, circa 1905

The field in front of the Church formerly known as Beacon Oak Field was the site of a 15th-century beacon at Sawcut (sic), sighting from Tenterden and Alomsbridge (about Newington Bridge, Kent, name has disappeared). The beacon was in the form of a tar filled barrel in an oak tree that was burnt down around 1930 but the stump remains.

The parish includes a two-acre field known as The Butt Field, which since 1703 has been available to the people of the village for "archery practice, recreation and sport". It is now mainly used for the grazing of sheep.

Within the parish there is a Site of Special Scientific Interest (SSSI), Houghton Green Cliff. This is an exposed cliff face displaying sandstones of geological interest.

In addition, part of the Dungeness, Romney Marsh & Rye SSSI lies within Playden parish.

== People ==
The artist and scientific illustrator Brian Hargreaves (1935-2011) lived in Playden up until the time of his death.
