= Dungeness, Romney Marsh and Rye Bay =

Conservation area in southeast England

Coordinates: 50.921°N 0.965°E

- Site of Special Scientific Interest
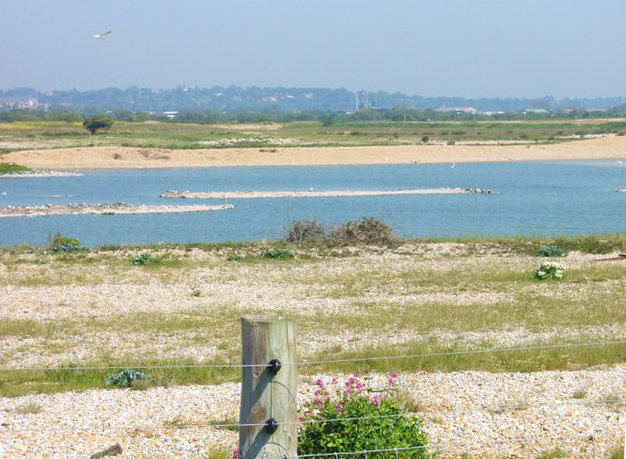
- Lake with islands in Rye Harbour Nature Reserve
- Location of Dungeness, Romney Marsh and Rye Bay.
- Area of search: East Sussex; Kent
- Grid reference: TR 008 202
- Interest: Biological; Geological
- Area: 10,172.9 hectares (25,138 acres)
- Notification date: 2006
- Location map: Magic Map

Dungeness, Romney Marsh and Rye Bay is a 10,172.9-hectare (25,138-acre) biological and geological Site of Special Scientific Interest which stretches from New Romney in Kent to Winchelsea in East Sussex. An area of 5,129.5 hectares (12,675 acres) is a Special Protection Area, an area of 3,141.1 hectares (7,762 acres) is a Special Area of Conservation, and an area of 6,377.6 hectares (15,759 acres) is a Ramsar Site, a wetland site designated of international importance under the Ramsar Convention. Part of the site is in the High Weald Area of Outstanding Natural Beauty, parts are Geological Conservation Review sites, part is a Local Nature Reserve, and part is a Royal Society for the Protection of Birds (RSPB) nature reserve, and part is a National Nature Reserve.

Nationally important habitats in this site are saltmarsh, sand dunes, vegetated shingle, saline lagoons, standing waters, lowland ditch systems, and basin fens, and it has many rare and endangered species of fauna and flora. It is geologically important as its deposits display the chronology of coastal evolution. Due to this and the areas recognition as an internationally important costal landscape, numerous studies and palaeoenvironmental investigations have focused on the area.

Romney Marsh is a huge wetland lying to the east of Rye, which is on the edge of the marsh. Dungeness is a shingle headland that protects Romney Marsh from the sea. Coastal systems have resulted in barriers of sand dunes and shingle beaches. The largest most diverse shingle beach in Britain is located here. The Dungeness headland has an area of open shingle that is 7.5 by 3.7 miles, the largest in Europe. The beaches barriers have diverted rivers running from the Weald to form a mudflat and saltmarsh environment.

Wild bird species found in the area include the bewick’s swan, bittern, marsh and hen harriers and the little tern, which are particularly associated with the area. Redshanks, lapwings and reedbeds have been sighted in the summer and bearded tits in the winter, at the RSPB nature reserve. The areas unique habitat supports the wintering and breeding of waterbirds, birds of prey, passage warblers and breeding seabirds. The wetlands and unique habitat also support bryophytes (mosses, liverworts, and hornworts), vascular plants, invertebrates and endangered wetland species.
