= River Line SSSI =

Protected area in East Sussex, England

Coordinates: 50.946°N 0.441°E

- Site of Special Scientific Interest
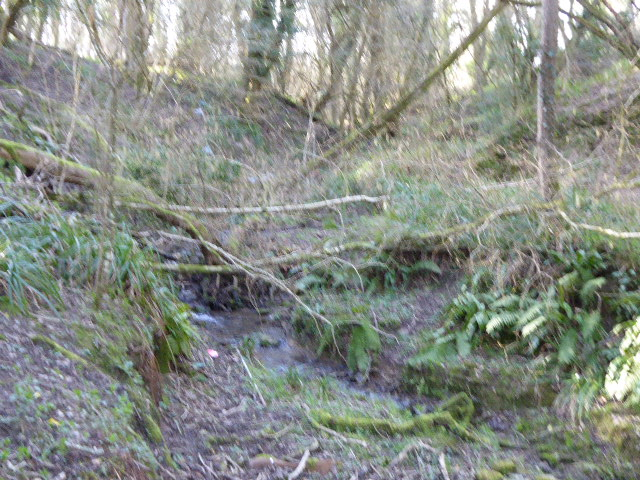
- Location of River Line SSSI.
- Area of search: East Sussex
- Grid reference: TQ 716 191
- Interest: Geological
- Area: 2.2 hectares (5.4 acres)
- Notification date: 1997
- Location map: Magic Map

River Line SSSI is a 2.2-hectare (5.4-acre) geological Site of Special Scientific Interest south of Robertsbridge in East Sussex. It is a Geological Conservation Review site.

This site exposes a sequence of sections in the Purbeck Beds, which date to the Upper Jurassic and Lower Cretaceous periods. The sections throw light on the environment of the period and some are marine, with fossil ostracods and crustaceans.
