= Plashett Park Wood =

Protected area in East Sussex, England

Coordinates: 50.921°N 0.077°E

- Site of Special Scientific Interest
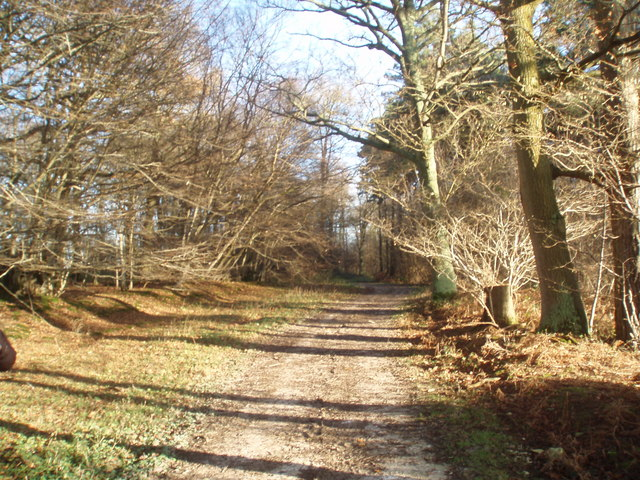
- Location of Plashett Park Wood.
- Area of search: East Sussex
- Grid reference: TQ 461 156
- Interest: Biological
- Area: 157.6 hectares (389 acres)
- Notification date: 1985
- Location map: Magic Map

Plashett Park Wood is a 157.6-hectare (389-acre) biological Site of Special Scientific Interest between Lewes and Uckfield in East Sussex.

This ancient wood has an extensive area of rides. There are several rare plants, such as the spiked rampion and 25 species of butterfly, including the pearl bordered fritillary, purple hairstreak and silver-washed fritillary. There are also 67 species of breeding birds.
