= Rock Wood =

Site of Special Scientific Interest in East Sussex

Coordinates: 51.014°N 0.094°E

- Site of Special Scientific Interest
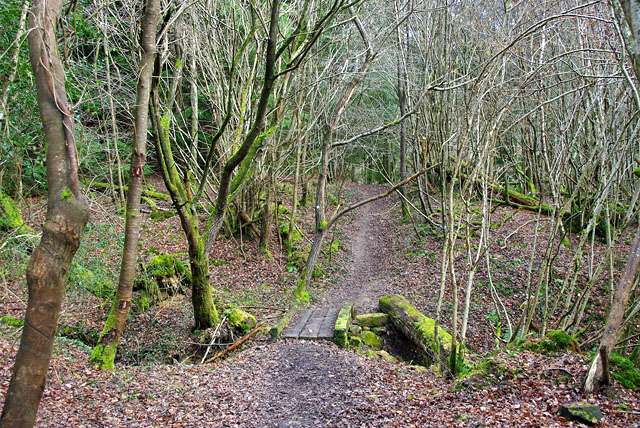
- Location of Rock Wood.
- Area of search: East Sussex
- Grid reference: TQ 470 259
- Interest: Biological
- Area: 10.4 hectares (26 acres)
- Notification date: 1986
- Location map: Magic Map

Rock Wood is a 10.4-hectare (26-acre) biological Site of Special Scientific Interest north of Uckfield in East Sussex.

This ancient wood has several different types of broadleaved woodland, a stream which cuts through a steep sided valley and a small waterfall. The valley has a moist and mild climate which provides a suitable habitat for mosses and liverworts which are uncommon in south-east England.
