= Folkington Reservoir =

Covered reservoir in East Sussex, England

Coordinates: 50.810°N 0.219°E

- Site of Special Scientific Interest
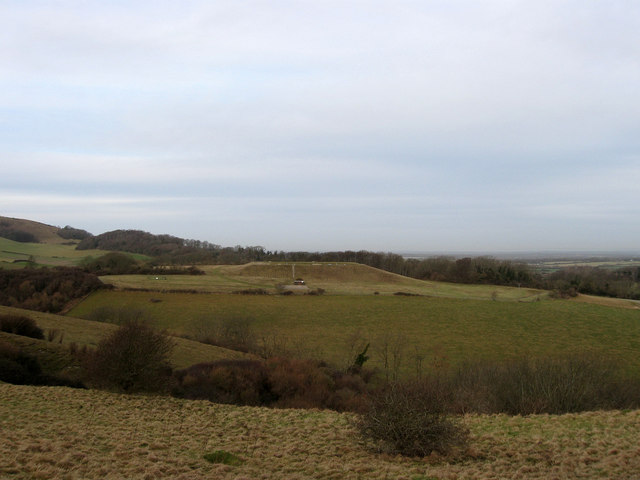
- Location of Folkington Reservoir.
- Area of search: East Sussex
- Grid reference: TQ 564 035
- Interest: Biological
- Area: 5.8 hectares (14 acres)
- Notification date: 1987
- Location map: Magic Map

Folkington Reservoir is a 5.8-hectare (14-acre) biological Site of Special Scientific Interest south-west of Polegate in East Sussex.

The banks of the reservoir support a rich chalk grassland flora including kidney vetch, horseshoe vetch, pyramidal orchid, fragrant orchid and the rare and protected hairy mallow. The reservoir itself is covered and the bare chalk on top supports ruderal species such as scarlet pimpernel and parsley piert.
