= Penn's Rocks =

Coordinates: 51.092°N 0.171°E

- Site of Special Scientific Interest
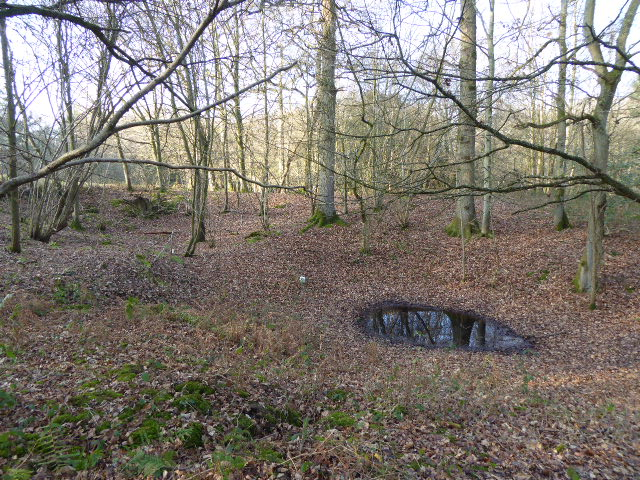
- Location of Penn's Rocks.
- Area of search: East Sussex
- Grid reference: TQ 521 348
- Interest: Biological
- Area: 10.2 hectares (25 acres)
- Notification date: 1985
- Location map: Magic Map

Penn's Rocks is a 10.2-hectare (25-acre) biological Site of Special Scientific Interest north of Crowborough in East Sussex.

This site is a steep sided valley on sandstone with many mosses and liverworts, which is a nationally rare habitat. Uncommon species include Orthodontium gracile, Bazzania trilobata, Saccogyna viticulosa and Harpanthus scutatus.

This site is in four separate areas. A footpath runs through one of them but the others are private land.
