= Scaynes Hill SSSI =

Protected area in East Sussex, England

Coordinates: 50.987°N 0.020°W

Scaynes Hill
- Site of Special Scientific Interest
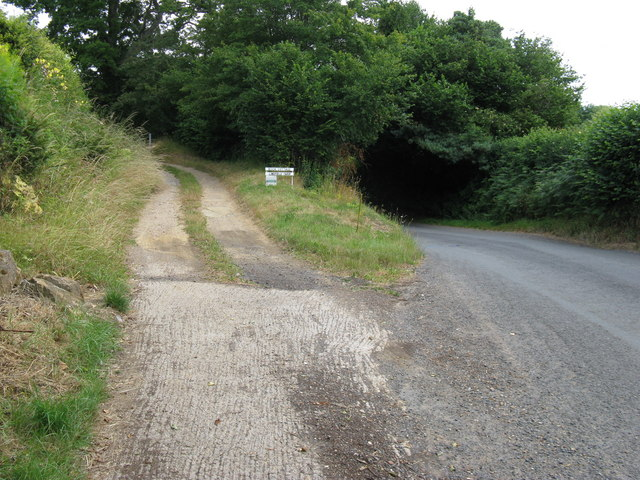
- Location of Scaynes Hill.
- Area of search: East Sussex
- Grid reference: TQ 391 227
- Interest: Geological
- Area: 0.04 hectares (0.099 acres)
- Notification date: 1999
- Location map: Magic Map

Scaynes Hill is a 0.04-hectare (0.099-acre) geological Site of Special Scientific Interest north-west of Newick in East Sussex. It is a Geological Conservation Review site.

This disused quarry and road section exposes yellow sandstone of the Grinstead Clay, dating to the Valanginian stage around 135 million years ago. The sandstone was deposited by a meandering river.
