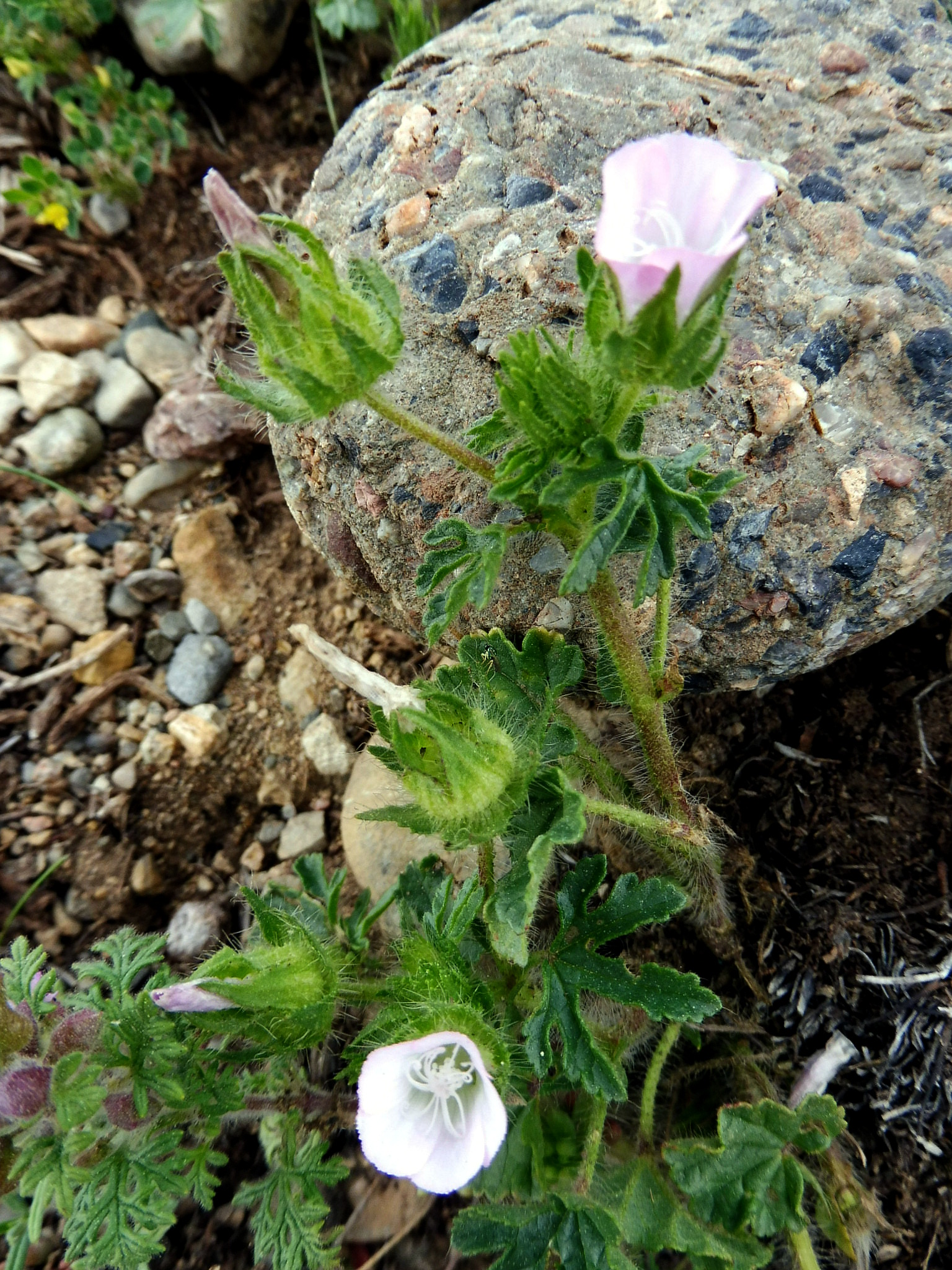

Scientific classification
- Kingdom: Plantae
- Clade: Tracheophytes
- Clade: Angiosperms
- Clade: Eudicots
- Clade: Rosids
- Order: Malvales
- Family: Malvaceae
- Genus: Malva
- Species: M. setigera

Binomial name
- Malva setigera L.

= Malva setigera =

Species of plant in the mallow family

Malva setigera, also known as Althaea hirsuta, the rough marsh-mallow, hairy marsh-mallow, hispid marsh-mallow or hairy mallow, is a species of annual herb in the family Malvaceae. It has a self-supporting growth form and simple, broad leaves. Individuals can grow to 28 cm (11 in).

== Distribution ==
The rough marsh-mallow is native to central Europe, the Mediterranean and the Caucasus. It has been introduced to the United Kingdom, the United States and Canada.

== Botanical gallery ==
Photos from Antalya except where indicated

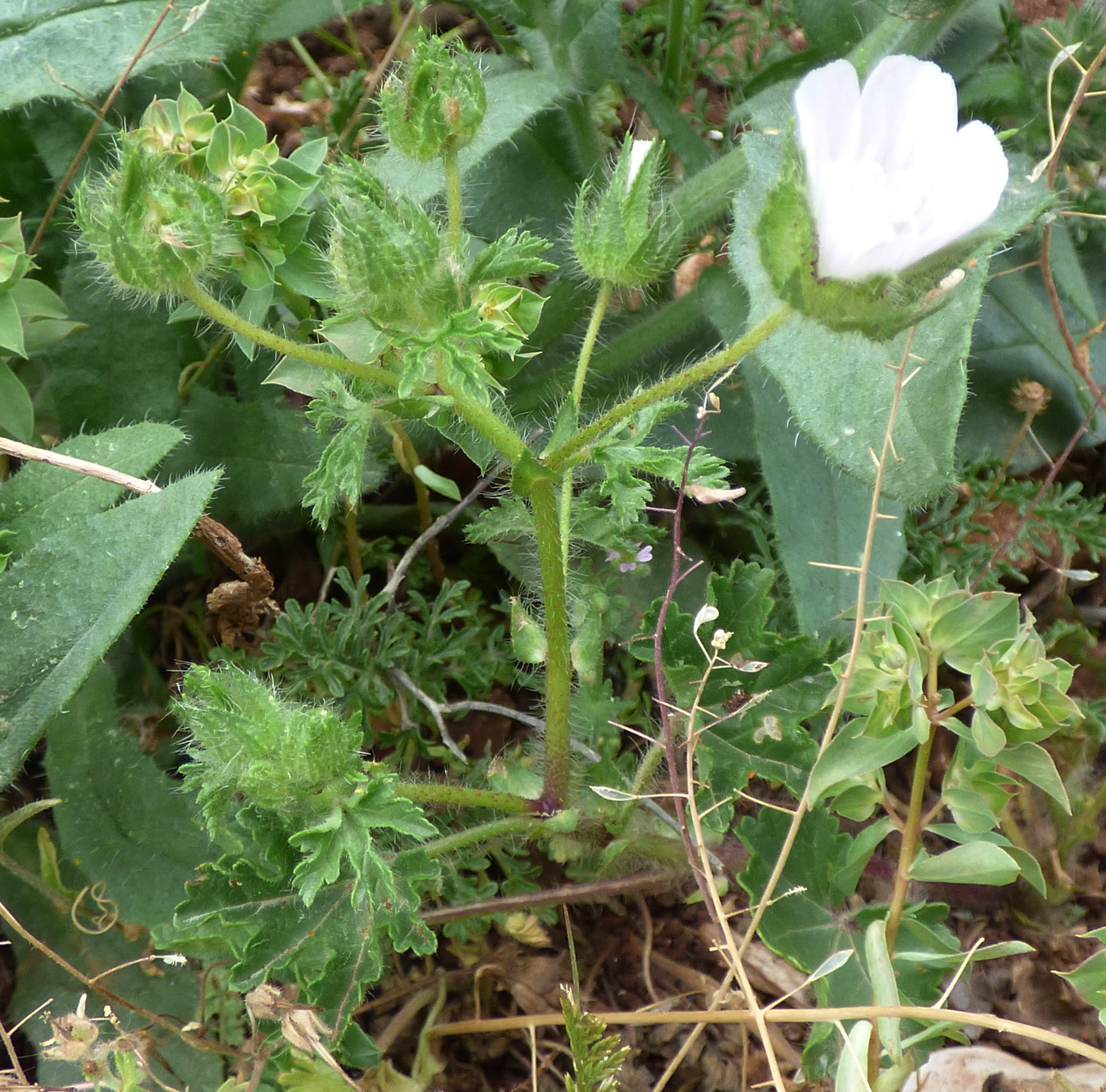
Plant form, side, to 60 cm, annual stem

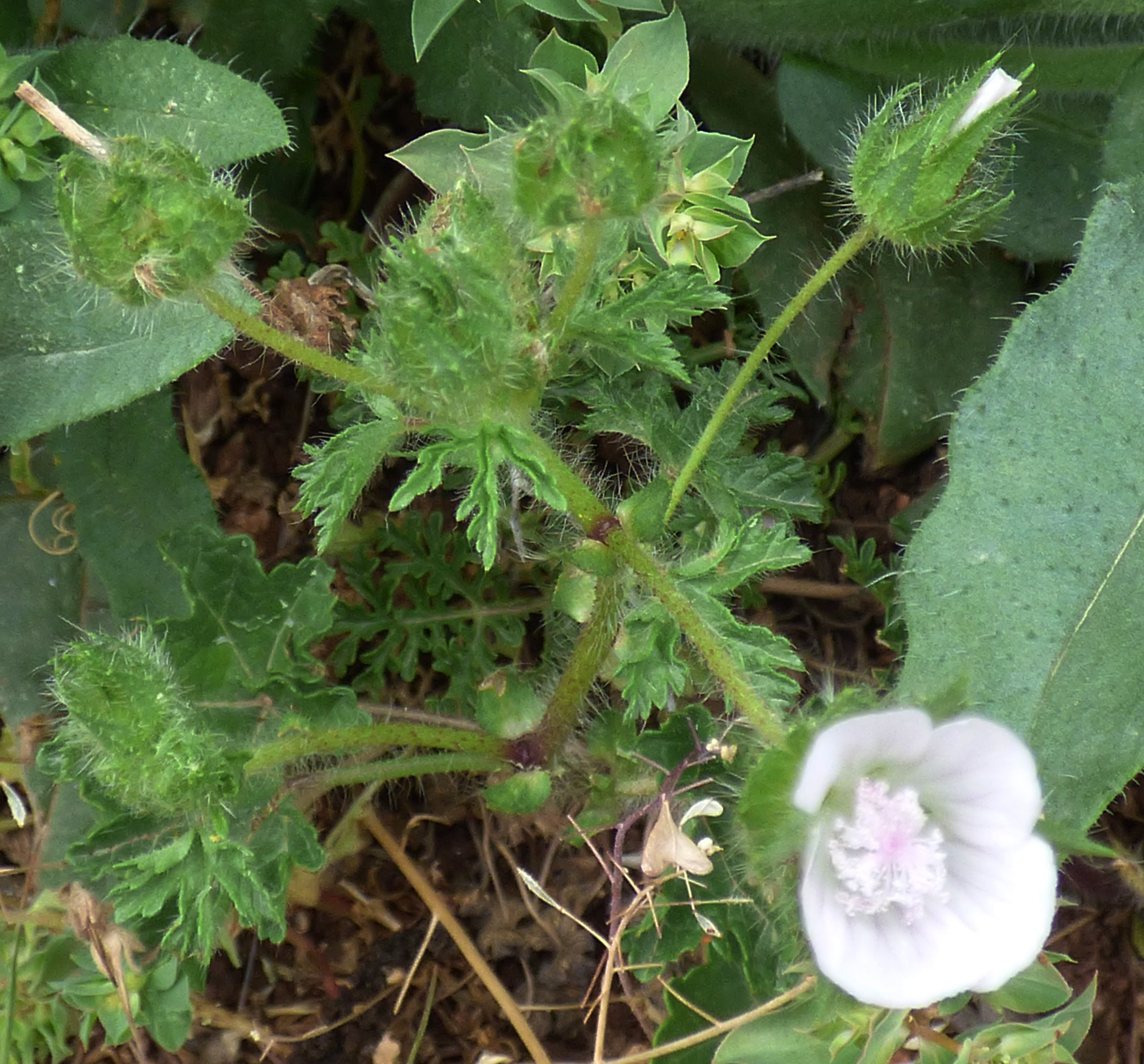
Plant form, above, stem leaves 3-5 lobed

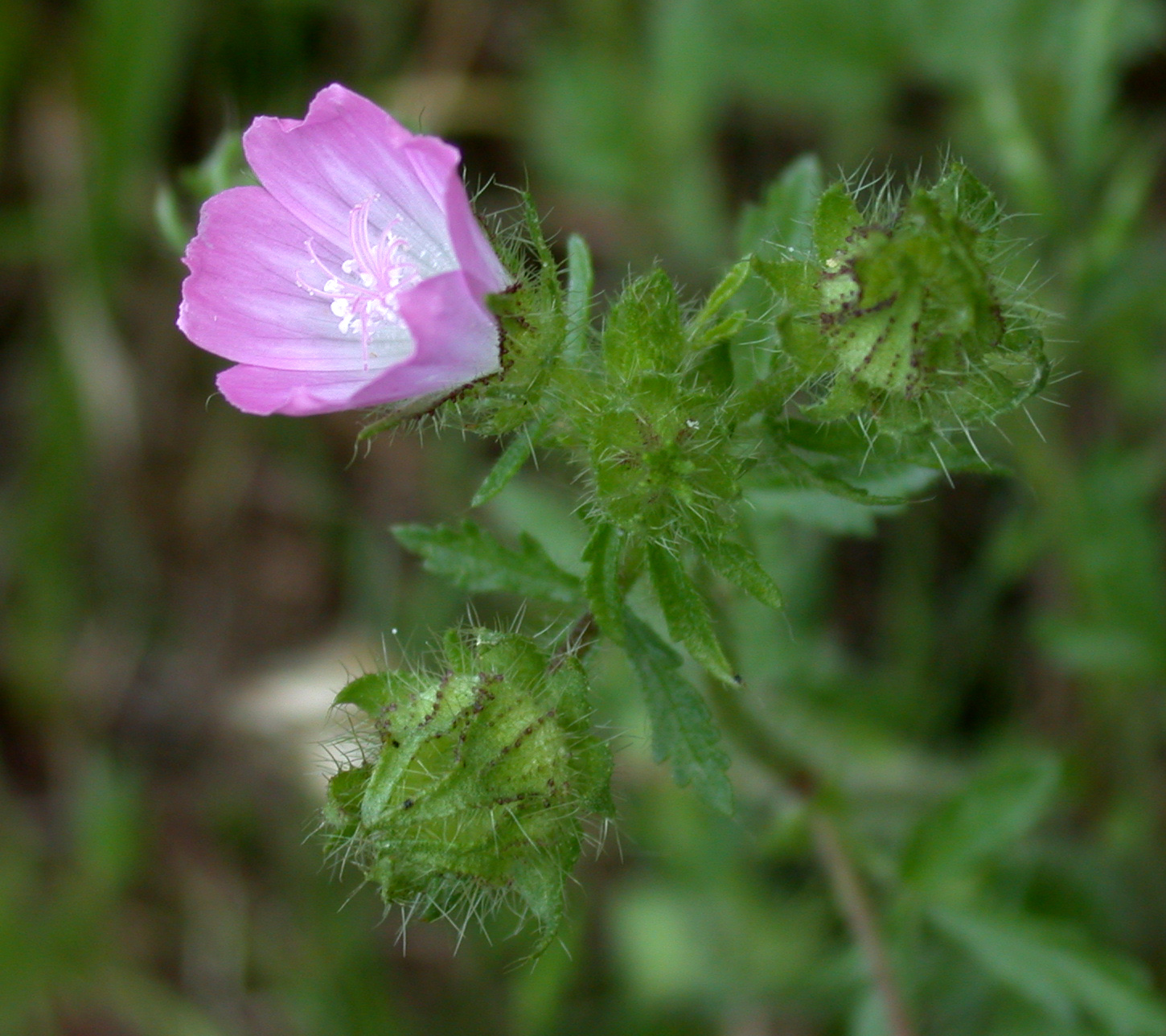
Flower, anthers pale, strongly-coloured form (England)

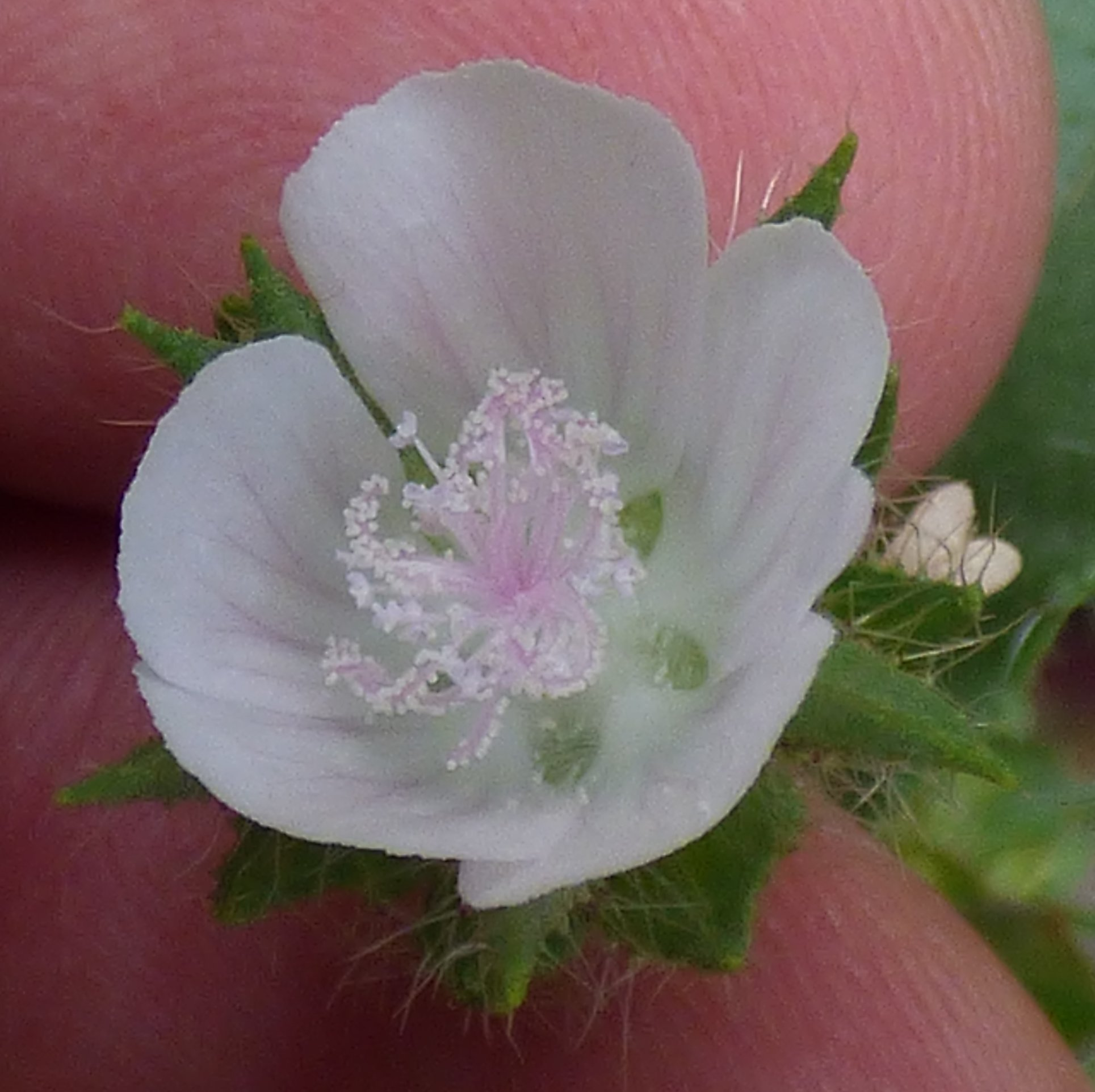
Flower, anthers pale, pale form

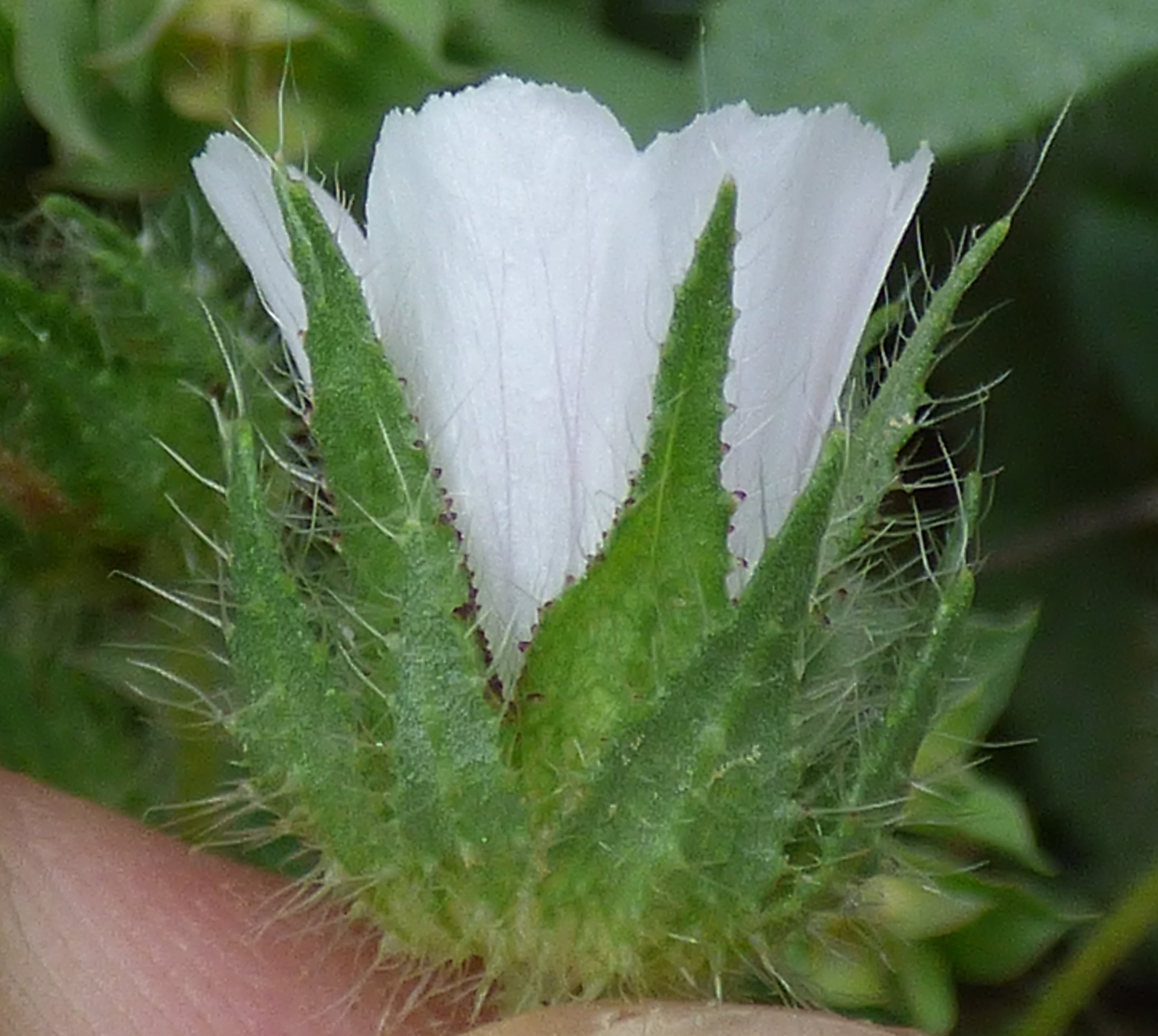
Flower, side view, calyx nearly as long as flower, having many-broad-part epicalyx at base, hairs mostly coarse and simple with bulbous bases

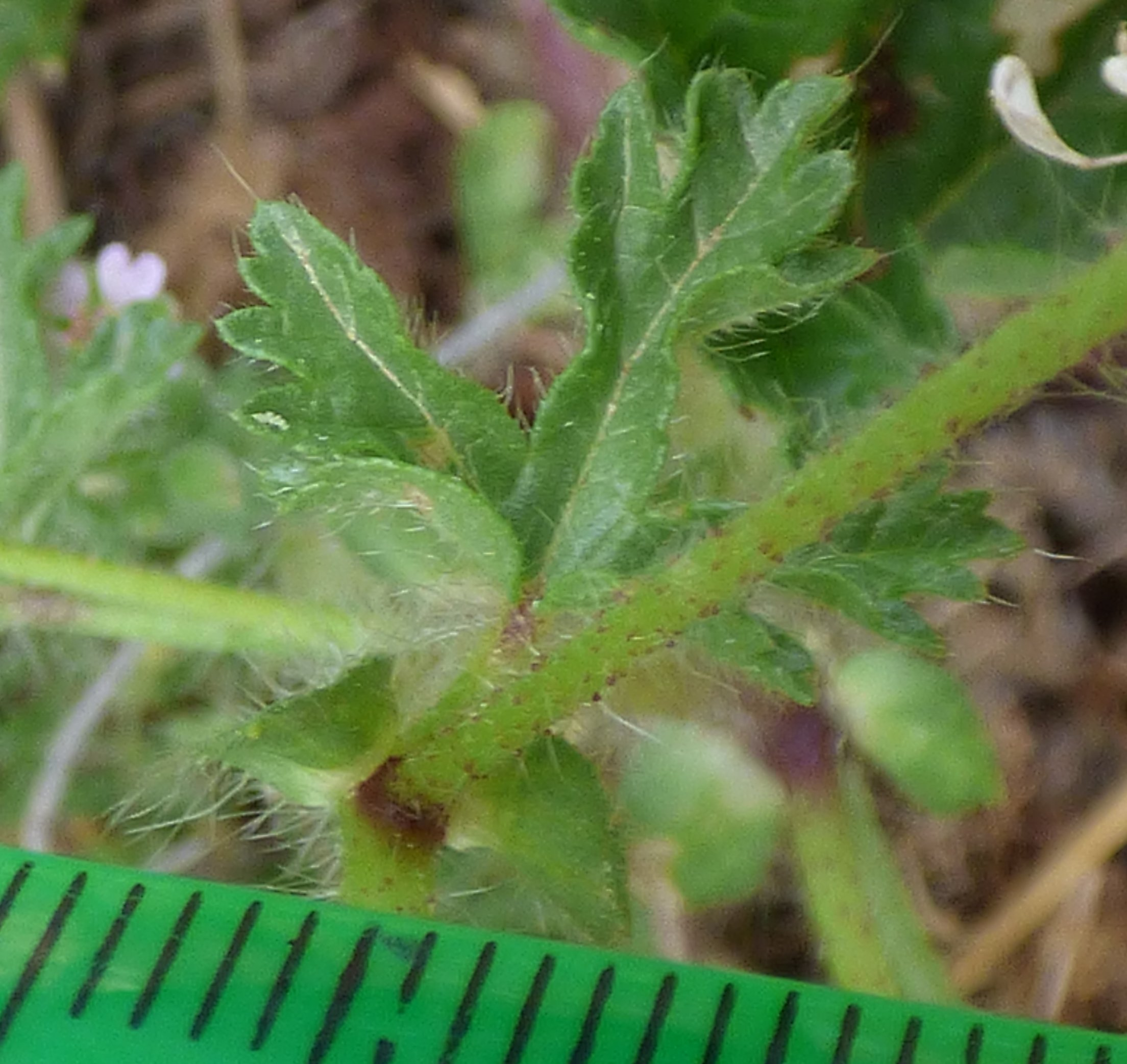
Leaf, and stipule at leaf-stalk base

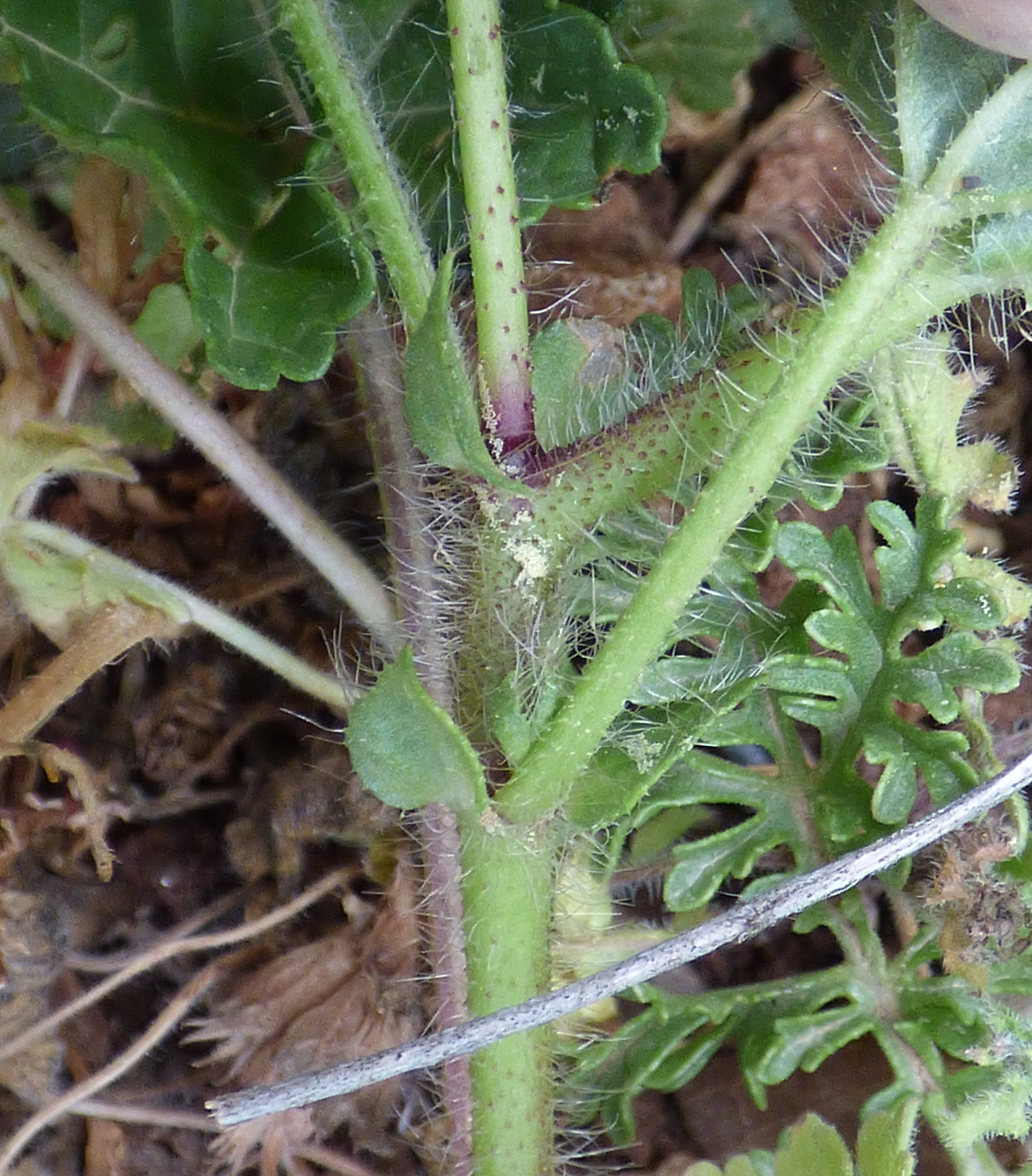
Stem, with mostly coarse simple hairs with bulbous bases, showing stipules where leaf stalks meet stem

== Sources ==
This article incorporates text from a free content work. Licensed under CC0 (license statement/permission). Text taken from Althaea hirsuta. Encyclopedia of Life.
