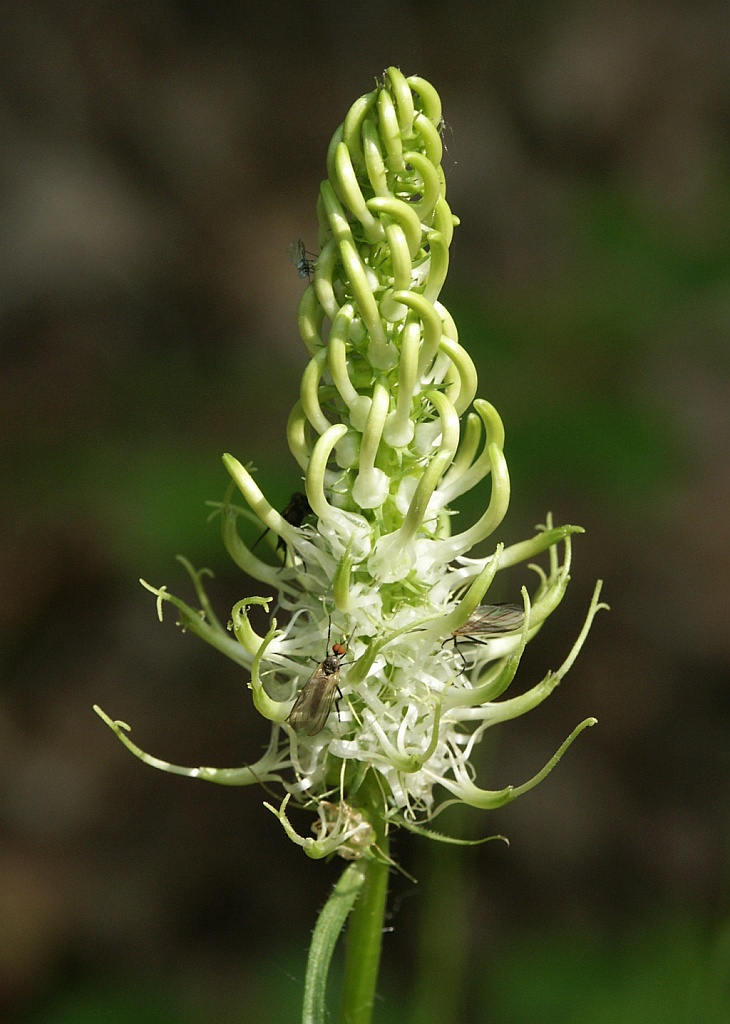
- Phyteuma spicatum

Scientific classification
- Kingdom: Plantae
- Clade: Tracheophytes
- Clade: Angiosperms
- Clade: Eudicots
- Clade: Asterids
- Order: Asterales
- Family: Campanulaceae
- Genus: Phyteuma
- Species: P. spicatum

Binomial name
- Phyteuma spicatum L.

= Phyteuma spicatum =

Species of flowering plant

Phyteuma spicatum, the spiked rampion, is a herbaceous perennial plant in the family Campanulaceae. It is common across much of Europe. Its common names include raiponce en épi (French), Ährige Teufelskralle (German), Ährige Rapunzel (Swiss German), and Raponzolo giallo (Italian).

Found in diverse types of forest, especially broadleaf beech forests, but also coniferous forests, as well as prairies, along forest roads, in logging clearings.

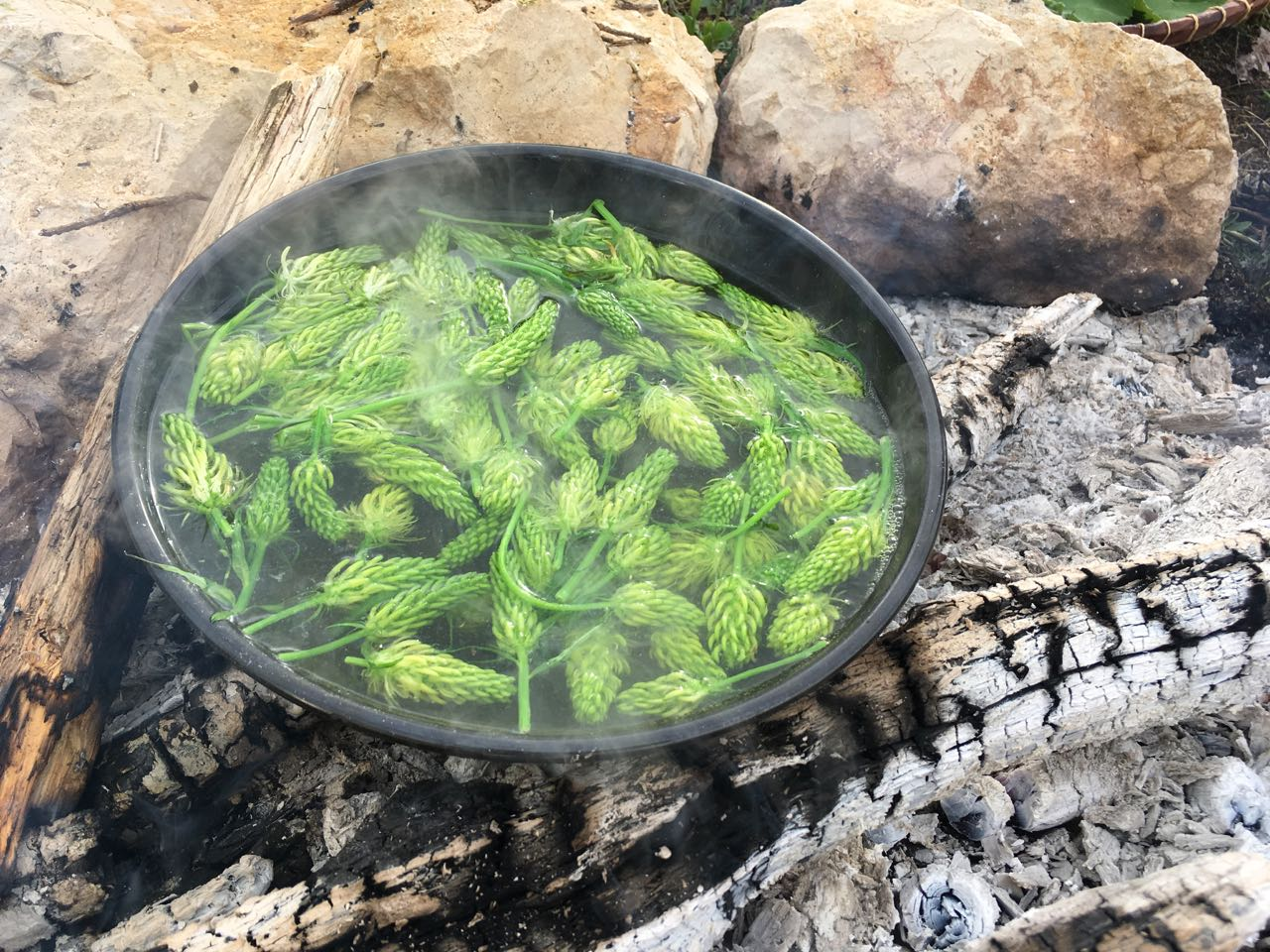
Cooking young spiked rampion flowers

The leaves, roots, and flowers are edible, and can be eaten raw. Flowers before blooming can for instance be prepared by steaming or boiling briefly, then seasoned (see photo).

== Distribution ==
- Global: GBIF. A collation of numerous data sources which include both historical data and occurrences outside natural range.
- Britain and Ireland: BSBI Atlas Current known distribution map by hectad in the British Isles. Natural distribution is confined to East Sussex.
- Germany: FloraWeb.
- Norway: Norsk Rødliste 2006. Species listed as Vulnerable on Norwegian Red Data List, where it is confined to an area of Telemark county.
- Switzerland: Infoflora.

== Description and biology ==
- Online Atlas of the British and Irish Flora
- Plantlife
- FloraWeb in German.
- Photos: Günther's Site; Gerhard Nitter
