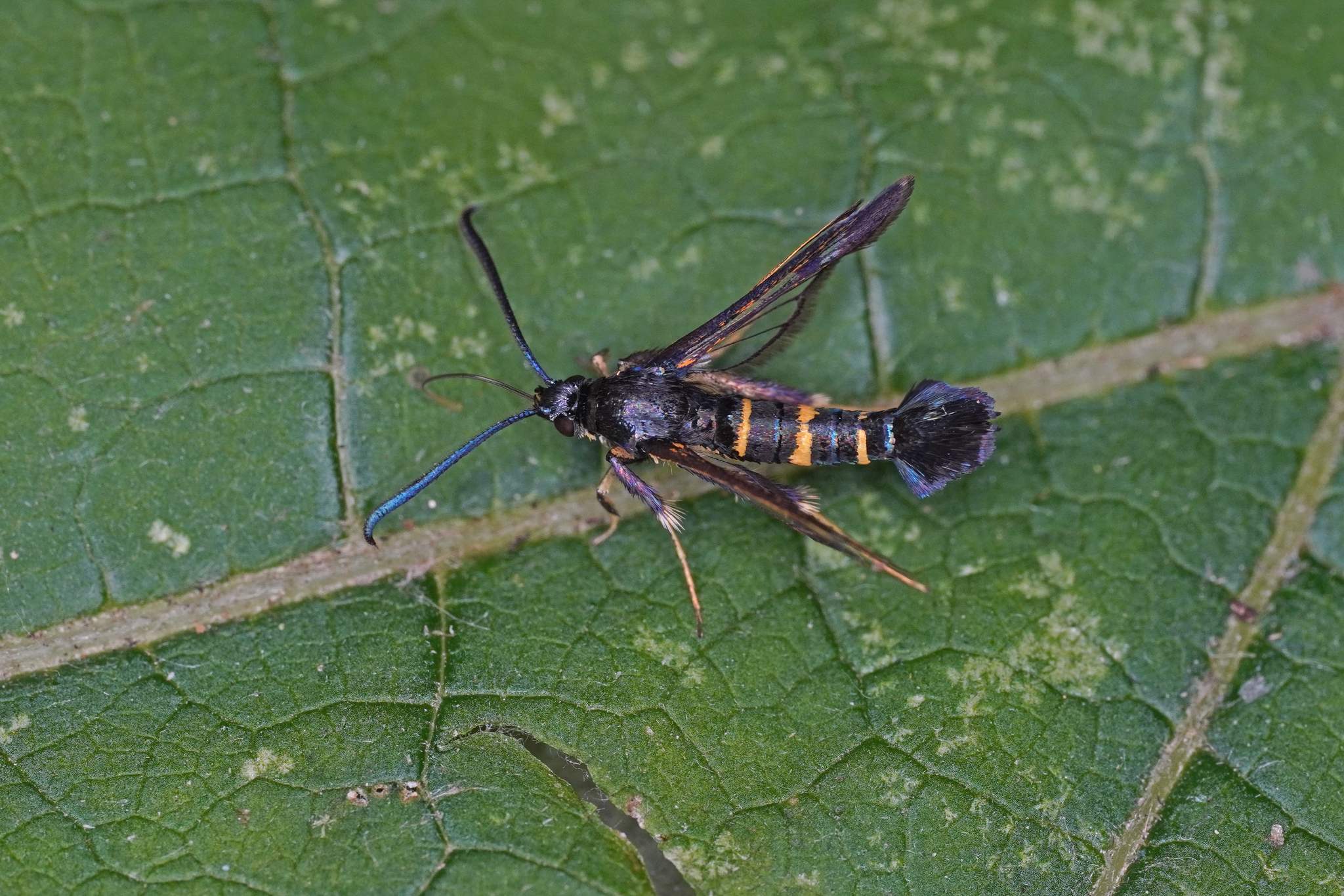

Scientific classification
- Kingdom: Animalia
- Phylum: Arthropoda
- Clade: Pancrustacea
- Class: Insecta
- Order: Lepidoptera
- Family: Sesiidae
- Genus: Synanthedon
- Species: S. flaviventris

Binomial name
- Synanthedon flaviventris (Staudinger, 1883)

Synonyms
- Sesia flaviventris Staudinger, 1883; Synanthedon flaviventris ab. fulva Turner, 1928

= Synanthedon flaviventris =

Species of moth

Synanthedon flaviventris, the sallow clearwing, is a moth of the family Sesiidae. The larvae form pear-shaped galls on sallows (Salix spp).

== Description ==
The eggs are laid in the axils on slender shoots (<10 mm diameter) of sallows, and the first year larva excavates a tunnel which shows no external signs of the larva. In the spring of the following year the larva can be as long as 17–18 mm and tunnels deeper into the tissue of the stem, excavating a vertical tunnel 50–75 mm long and 3 mm in diameter. By the second autumn the frass is pressed into cavities between the bark and wood, and the pear-shaped gall is noticeable. (Note: The red-tipped clearwing (S. formicaeformis) also forms pear-shaped galls (>10 mm diameter) on willows.) The larva feeds on sallows and their hybrids; eared willow (Salix aurita), goat willow (S. caprea), creeping willow (S. repens), grey willow (S. cinerea), white willow (S. alba), crack willow (Salix × fragilis), European violet willow (S. daphnoides) and rosemary-leaved willow (S. rosmarinifolia). Before pupation, the larva makes an exit hole and the pupa (11–13 mm long) is yellowish and formed head down in a chamber above the gall. There is no cocoon. Adults have a wingspan of 17–20 mm and are on the wing in June and July. The species has a two-year life cycle, with adults present mostly in even years.

== Distribution ==
It is found in most of Europe (except Ireland, Norway, the Netherlands, the Iberian Peninsula, most of the Balkan Peninsula and Ukraine). and Russia (southern Siberia, Baikal, Irkutsk, Chaborowsk, Ussuri).
