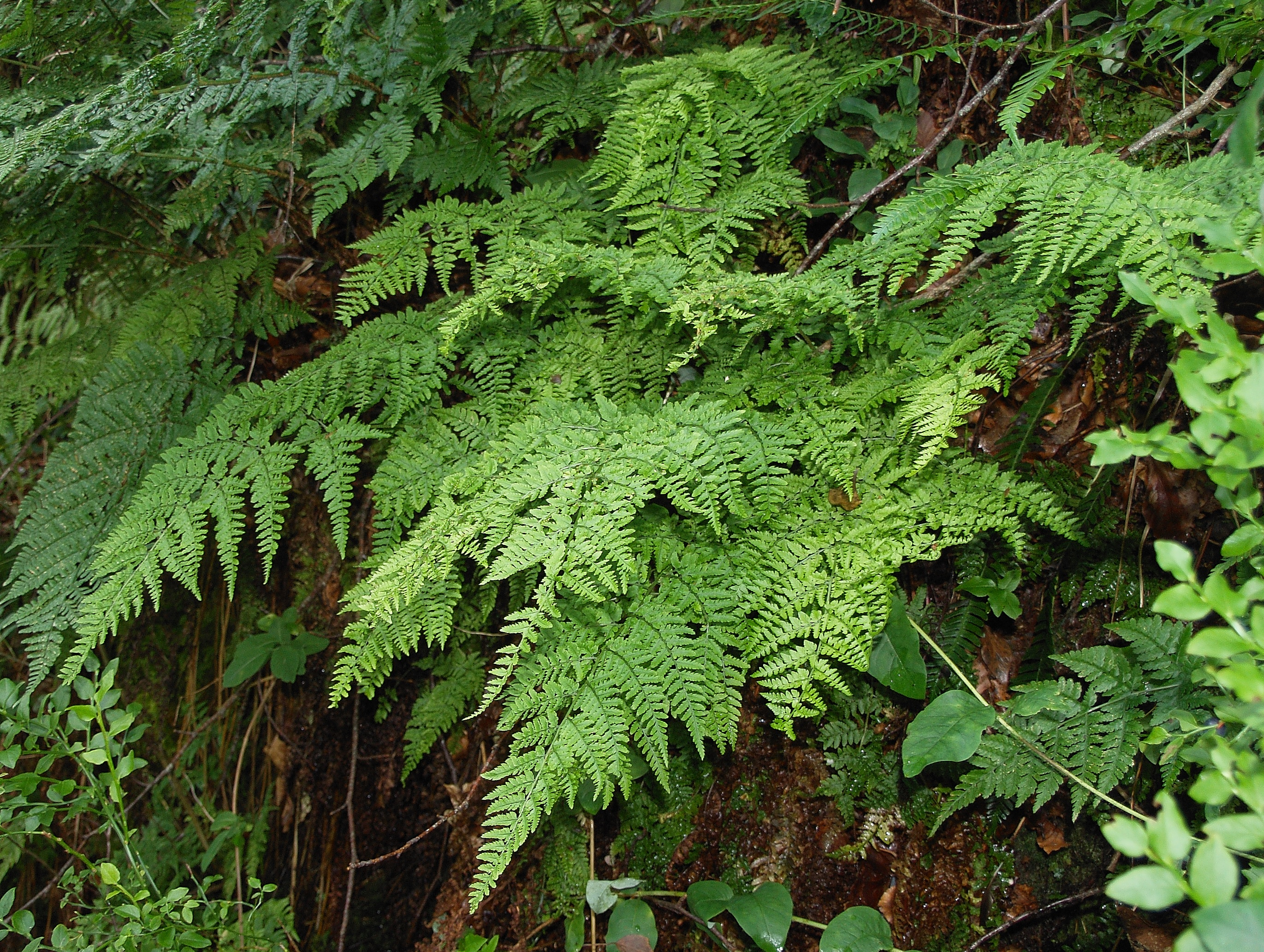
- Dryopteris aemula in Galloway, Southern Scotland

Scientific classification
- Kingdom: Plantae
- Clade: Embryophytes
- Clade: Tracheophytes
- Division: Polypodiophyta
- Class: Polypodiopsida
- Order: Polypodiales
- Suborder: Polypodiineae
- Family: Dryopteridaceae
- Genus: Dryopteris
- Species: D. aemula

Binomial name
- Dryopteris aemula (Aiton) Kuntze

= Dryopteris aemula =

Hay-scented buckler-fern

Species of fern

Dryopteris aemula, the hay-scented buckler-fern or hay-scented fern, is a species of perennial leptosporangiate fern.

== Description ==
Dryopteris aemula grows as a crown of fronds arising from a short ascending rhizome.

The rachis is dark purple-brown with red-brown lanceolate scales. Leaves are tri-pinnate, triangular-ovate or triangular-lanceolate, 15–60 cm (5.9–23.6 in) long, often arching, semi-evergreen and pale yellow-green. Scattered small sessile glands grow on the underside or both surfaces of the fronds. Pinnae are slightly concave giving the frond a characteristic crisped appearance. The plant is hay-scented.

Sori or spore-producing organs occur in a row down each side of the midrib. The indusium of the sorus is irregularly toothed and edged with sessile glands.

The plant does not reproduce vegetatively and relies upon spores to generate new individuals.

== Distribution ==
Dryopteris aemula is confined to the atlantic coastal areas of western Europe and Macaronesia. D. aemula is highly oceanic in its distribution occurring mostly in the Köppen climate type Cfb (oceanic climates). Even within Great Britain, it is restricted to western districts and has just a few outlying eastern localities such as The Weald.

D. aemula reaches the northern limit of its distribution in Britain.

20% of the world population of D. aemula is in the United Kingdom.
