= Houghton Green Cliff =

Site of Special Scientific Interest in East Sussex

Coordinates: 50.9690°N 0.7487°E

- Site of Special Scientific Interest
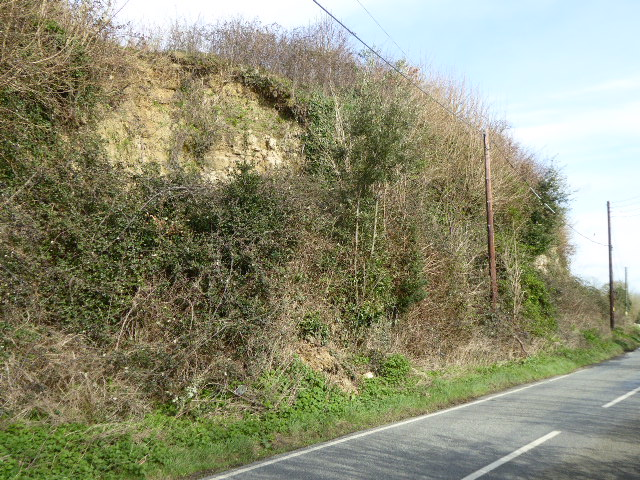
- Location of Houghton Green Cliff.
- Area of search: East Sussex, United Kingdom
- Grid reference: TQ 930 224
- Interest: Geological
- Area: 0.14 hectares (0.35 acres)
- Notification date: 1992
- Location map: Magic Map

Houghton Green Cliff is a 0.14-hectare (0.35-acre) geological Site of Special Scientific Interest north of Rye in East Sussex, United Kingdom. It is a Geological Conservation Review site.

This site exposes the Cliff End Sandstone Member of the Wadhurst Clay Formation, part of the Wealden Group, which dates to the Lower Cretaceous between 140 and 100 million years ago. It is a key site for studies of sandstone bodies in the clay formation.

The site is at the side of a public road.
