= Maplehurst Wood =

Protected area in East Sussex, England

Coordinates: 50.892°N 0.569°E

- Site of Special Scientific Interest
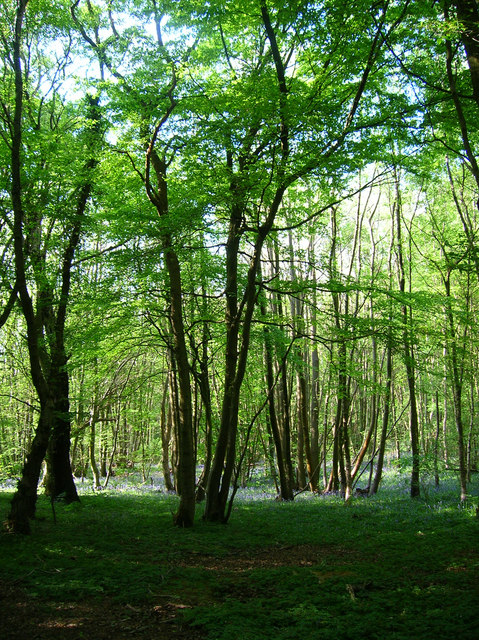
- Location of Maplehurst Wood.
- Area of search: East Sussex
- Grid reference: TQ 808 134
- Interest: Biological
- Area: 31.6 hectares (78 acres)
- Notification date: 1985
- Location map: Magic Map

Maplehurst Wood is a 31.6-hectare (78-acre) biological Site of Special Scientific Interest on the northern outskirts of Hastings in East Sussex.

This wood has probably existed since the Middle Ages and a large part of it is still semi-natural. It has a variety of woodland types and a network of rides and streams. The wood is locally important for its breeding birds such as greater spotted woodpecker, tawny owl and nuthatch.
