= Leasam Heronry Wood =

Protected area in East Sussex, England

Coordinates: 50.9627°N 0.7152°E

- Site of Special Scientific Interest
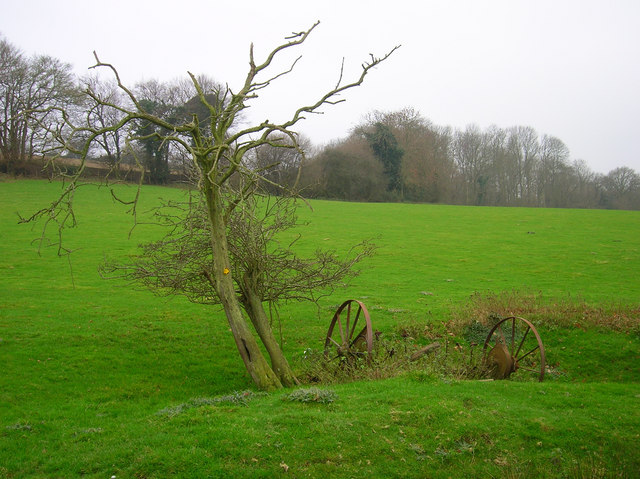
- Location of Leasam Heronry Wood.
- Area of search: East Sussex
- Grid reference: TQ 907 216
- Interest: Biological
- Area: 2.1 hectares (5.2 acres)
- Notification date: 1984
- Location map: Magic Map

Leasam Heronry Wood is a 2.1-hectare (5.2-acre) biological Site of Special Scientific Interest north-west of Rye in East Sussex.

This wood is not long established but it contains a nationally important heronry. The birds began to use the site in 1935 and have bred there since 1940. There are over fifty breeding pairs, around 1% of the British population.

The site is private land with no public access.
