= List of local nature reserves in East Sussex =

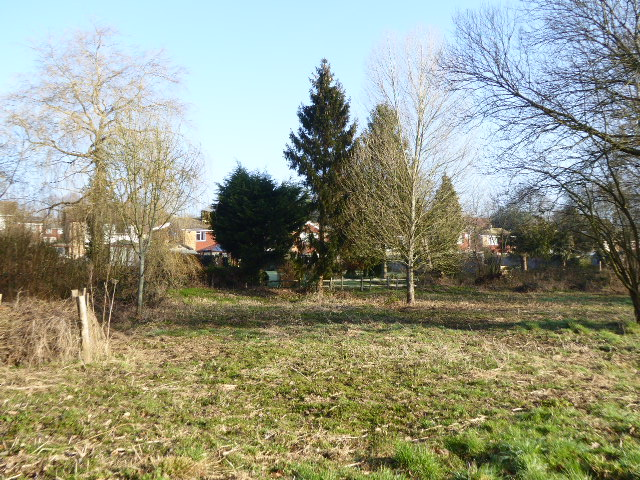
Hempstead Meadow

Local Nature Reserves (LNRs) are designated by local authorities under the National Parks and Access to the Countryside Act 1949. The local authority must have a legal control over the site, by owning or leasing it or having an agreement with the owner. LNRs are sites which have a special local interest either biologically or geologically, and local authorities have a duty to care for them. They can apply local byelaws to manage and protect LNRs.

East Sussex is a county in South East England. It is bordered by Kent to the north-east, West Sussex to the west, Surrey to the north and the English Channel to the south. It has an area of 1,725 km^{2} (666.0 mi^{2}) and a population as of 2018 of 552,000.

As of July 2019, there are 26 LNRs in East Sussex. Ten sites are Sites of Special Scientific Interest, three are Special Protection Areas, three are Special Areas of Conservation, one is a Ramsar site, two are Scheduled Monuments, two are Geological Conservation Review sites, one is a Nature Conservation Review site and six are managed by the Sussex Wildlife Trust.

== Key ==
=== Other classifications ===
- GCR = Geological Conservation Review site
- NCR = Nature Conservation Review site
- Ramsar = Ramsar site, an internationally important wetland site
- SAC = Special Area of Conservation
- SM = Scheduled monument
- SPA = Special Protection Area under the European Union Directive on the Conservation of Wild Birds
- SSSI = Site of Special Scientific Interest
- SWT = Sussex Wildlife Trust

== Sites ==
Site	Photograph	Area (Note: The area is taken from the Natural England map of each site. (Click on the identify icon (i) in the "Feature Tools" and then click on the site.))	Location (Note: The location is taken from the Natural England details page for the site.)	Borough	Other classifications	Map (Note: The maps are on the Natural England database of Local Nature Reserves.)	Details (Note: Details are on the pages on each site in the Natural England database of Local Nature Reserves.)	Description
Arlington Reservoir	Arlington Reservoir	100.6 hectares (249 acres)	Polegate; 50.845°N 0.179°E; TQ 535 073	Wealden	SSSI	Map	Details	More than 10,000 birds winter on this site, including over 1% of the UK population of wigeon. In addition, more than 170 species of birds on passage have been recorded. The River Cuckmere runs through the reservoir and there are areas of tall fen and exposed shingle.
Beacon Hill	Beacon Hill	18.6 hectares (46 acres)	Brighton; 50.809°N 0.065°W; TQ 364 028	Brighton and Hove		Map	Details	This chalk grassland site has extensive views out to sea and inland. Flora include round-headed rampion and several species of orchid, while there are birds such as skylarks. Rottingdean Windmill is a grade II listed building towards the south of the site.
Benfield Hill	Benfield Hill	11.8 hectares (29 acres)	Hove; 50.855°N 0.210°W; TQ 261 077	Brighton and Hove		Map	Details	This area of grassland and scrub is on south and east facing slopes. There are many glow-worms.
Bevendean Down	Bevendean Down	64.6 hectares (160 acres)	Brighton; 50.843°N 0.102°W; TQ 337 066	Brighton and Hove		Map	Details	This site is in five separate blocks. It is mainly chalk grassland and there are also areas of woodland and scrub. There is a dew pond, a variety of orchids and insects such as the Adonis blue butterfly and hornet robberfly.
Castle Hill, Newhaven	Castle Hill, Newhaven	16.4 hectares (41 acres)	Newhaven; 50.782°N 0.048°E; TQ 445 001	Lewes	GCR, SSSI	Map	Details	The hill has views to the sea to the south, the Downs to the north and Newhaven to the east. Habitats are geologically important cliffs, scrub and grassy glades. There are several badger setts and other fauna include sea birds, slow worms and common lizards.
Chailey Common	Chailey Common	173.3 hectares (428 acres)	Lewes; 50.973°N 0.029°W; TQ 385 211	Lewes	SSSI	Map	Details	This common on Ashdown Sands has areas of acidic grassland, marshy grassland, bracken, wet heath, dry heath, a stream, ditches and ponds. Butterfly species include the silver-studded blue, grayling, pearl-bordered fritillary, high brown fritillary, green hairstreak and small pearl-bordered fritillary.
Church Wood and Robsack Wood	Church Wood	29.7 hectares (73 acres)	St Leonards-on-Sea; 50.872°N 0.534°E; TQ 784 111	Hastings		Map	Details	This site in four separate areas has semi-natural woodland, semi-improved grassland and streams. Woodland flora include toothwort, goldilocks buttercup and early purple orchid.
Crowborough Country Park	Crowborough Country Park	7.3 hectares (18 acres)	Crowborough; 51.048°N 0.180°E; TQ 529 299	Wealden		Map	Details	The park has diverse habitats including wet and dry woodland, grass and heath glades, marshes, streams and ponds. The main stream runs through a steep rocky gorge. Flora include the nationally rare moss Discelium nudum.
Filsham Reed Beds	Filsham Reed Beds	18.5 hectares (46 acres)	St Leonards-on-Sea; 50.860°N 0.524°E; TQ 777 097	Hastings	SSSI, SWT	Map	Details	This is one of the largest reedbeds in the county and it also has areas of grazing marsh, swamp and ancient woodland. There is a wide variety of plants and over 1000 species of invertebrates have been recorded. The bird life is important and diverse, with species such as Cetti's warbler, reed bunting, sedge warbler, purple heron, red-backed shrike and water rail.
Hastings Country Park and Fairlight Place Farm	Hastings Country Park	331.6 hectares (819 acres)	Hastings; 50.868°N 0.626°E; TQ 849 109	Hastings	GCR, SAC, SPA, SSSI	Map	Details	The park has views of Hastings old town and of the cliffs towards Beachy Head. Dinosaur footprints can be seen in intertidal rocks and there are many fossils. Habitats include cliff top grassland, arable land, cliffs, heath and woodland, which has rare liverworts and mosses.
Hempstead Meadow	Hempstead Meadow	1.6 hectares (4.0 acres)	Uckfield; 50.969°N 0.099°E; TQ 475 210	Wealden		Map	Details	The site is mainly wet grassland with scattered trees and scrub. Flora include primroses, tussock sedge and various ferns. The meadow is used as a foraging area by bats.
Ladies Mile	Ladies Mile	13.6 hectares (34 acres)	Brighton; 50.868°N 0.130°W; TQ 317 093	Brighton and Hove		Map	Details	This grassland site has extensive areas of horseshoe vetch and kidney vetch. There are also areas of scrub and a wood at the southern end.
Marline Wood	Marline Wood	40.3 hectares (100 acres)	St Leonards-on-Sea; 50.879°N 0.526°E; TQ 778 119	Hastings	SSSI, SWT	Map	Details	This site has ancient woodland and species-rich unimproved grassland. The wood has standards of pedunculate oak and coppice of hornbeam, hazel and sweet chestnut. A stream runs along a steep sided valley which has 61 species of mosses and liverworts, including uncommon species such as Fissidens rivularis, Tetrodontium brownianum and Metzgeria furcata.
Old Lodge	Old Lodge, Nutley	103.1 hectares (255 acres)	Uckfield; 51.055°N 0.085°E; TQ 462 305	Wealden	NCR, SAC, SPA, SSSI, SWT	Map	Details	This highland site is mainly grassland and heather, with areas of gorse and scattered birch and oak trees. There are also small Scots pine plantations. Birds include common redstart and common crossbills and there are large nests of red wood ants.
Old Roar Gill and Coronation Wood	Coronation Wood	7.6 hectares (19 acres)	Hastings; 50.875°N 0.563°E; TQ 804 115	Hastings		Map	Details	This site has areas of open water, broadleaved woodland, fern and tall herbs. Old Roar Gill is a narrow steep-sided valley at the northern end of Alexandra Park. It has uncommon liverworts, mosses and lichens, together with rare and scarce invertebrates such as Rolph's door snail and the crane fly Lipsothrix nervosa.
Railway Land, Lewes	Railway Land, Lewes	10.9 hectares (27 acres)	Lewes; 50.871°N 0.018°E; TQ 421 099	Lewes		Map	Details	This former railway goods yard has diverse habitats including grassland, wet willow woodland, floodplain grazing meadows, reedbeds, a network of drainage ditches and a tidal winterbourne stream. Birds include woodpeckers, kestrels and kingfishers.
Rye Harbour	Rye Harbour	325.4 hectares (804 acres)	Rye; 50.932°N 0.743°E; TQ 928 183	Rother	Ramsar, SAC, SPA, SSSI, SWT	Map	Details	This large reserve has diverse coastal habitats, including saltmarsh, shingle, reedbeds, saline lagoons, grazing marsh and flooded gravel pits. More than 280 species of birds have been recorded, of which 90 breed on the site. There are more than 450 flowering plant species, including twenty-seven which are scarce and two which are endangered, least lettuce and stinking hawksbeard.
Seaford Head	Seaford Head	150.2 hectares (371 acres)	Seaford; 50.763°N 0.138°E; TV 509 981	Lewes	SSSI, SWT	Map	Details	The site has diverse habitats with chalk grassland, chalk cliffs, scrub, vegetated shingle, wet grassland, saltmarsh and rockpools. Grassland flora include kidney vetch, squinancywort, moon carrot and clustered bellflower. There are butterflies such as silver-spotted skipper, chalkhill blue and adonis blue.
St Helen's Wood	St Helen's Wood	34.6 hectares (85 acres)	Hastings; 50.878°N 0.577°E; TQ 814 119	Hastings		Map	Details	The wood has many broad-leaved helleborines. There are also areas of grassland which are managed by horse grazing. Meadow flowers include red bartsia and green-winged orchids.
Stanmer Park/Coldean	Stanmer Park	187.9 hectares (464 acres)	Brighton; 50.868°N 0.104°W; TQ 335 093	Brighton and Hove		Map	Details	This is an eighteenth century landscaped park. It has mature woodland with ancient beech trees and bluebells, coppiced woodland, chalk grassland and an arboretum.
Summerfields Wood	Summerfields Wood	6.3 hectares (16 acres)	Hastings; 50.859°N 0.569°E; TQ 809 097	Hastings		Map	Details	There are many paths through this semi-natural wood, which has a number of ponds. Birds include firecrest, whinchat, ring ouzel, wood warbler, spotted flycatcher and pied flycatcher.
Waterhall	Brighton bridleway B76, Waterhall	90 hectares (220 acres)	East Grinstead; 50.87°N 0.173°W; TQ 382 344	Brighton and Hove				Waterhall is a 90-hectare (220-acre) Local Nature Reserve in Brighton, East Sussex. It is owned and managed by Brighton and Hove City Council.
Weir Wood Reservoir	Weirwood Reservoir	32.6 hectares (81 acres)	East Grinstead; 51.092°N 0.028°W; TQ 382 344	Wealden	SSSI	Map	Details	This is one of the largest bodies of open water in the county and it has rich and diverse communities of breeding, wintering and passage birds. Breeding birds include great crested grebe, teal, mute swan, tufted duck, little grebe, reed warbler, sedge warbler, coot and moorhen.
West Park, Uckfield	West Park, Uckfield	10.5 hectares (26 acres)	Uckfield; 50.973°N 0.081°E; TQ 462 214	Wealden		Map	Details	This site has grassland, woodland and a marshy area which provides a habitat for several orchid species, including the southern marsh orchid. There is also a population of dormice.
Whitehawk Hill	[Whitehawk Hill	50.3 hectares (124 acres)	Brighton; 50.828°N 0.110°W; TQ 332 049	Brighton and Hove	SM	Map	Details	This is species-rich chalk grassland which has views over Brighton and the sea, together with the Isle of Wight on clear days. There are colonies of chalkhill blue butterflies.
Wild Park/Hollingbury	Wild Park/Hollingbury	239.8 hectares (593 acres)	Brighton; 50.855°N 0.122°W; TQ 323 079	Brighton and Hove	SM	Map	Details	The park has views over Brighton. Species-rich chalk grassland is managed by sheep grazing. There is also extensive woodland with a network of footpaths, large areas of scrub, an Iron Age hillfort, a golf course and a dew pond.
Withdean and Westdene Woods	Withdean Wood	7.9 hectares (20 acres)	Brighton; 50.854°N 0.160°W; TQ 296 077	Brighton and Hove	SWT	Map	Details	Many of the mature trees on this site were destroyed by the Great Storm of 1987, but it still has a range of mammals including foxes, badgers and common pipistrelle bats, while there are birds such as great spotted woodpecker and firecrests.

== See also ==
- List of Sites of Special Scientific Interest in East Sussex
- Sussex Wildlife Trust

== Sources ==
- Ratcliffe, Derek, ed. (1977). A Nature Conservation Review. Vol. 2. Cambridge, UK: Cambridge University Press. ISBN 978-0-521-21403-2.
