= Polygonum angustifolium =

Polygonum angustifolium is a botanical synonym of three species of plant:

- Koenigia angustifolia, Polygonum angustifolium Pall. published in 1776, a homotypic synonym and the basionym of the species
- Persicaria minor, Polygonum angustifolium Roth published in 1789, heterotypic synonym, nomen illegitimum
- Bistorta vivipara, Polygonum angustifolium D.Don, published in 1825, heterotypic synonym, nomen illegitimum
