= Waltham Brooks =

Coordinates: 50.932°N 0.543°W

- Site of Special Scientific Interest
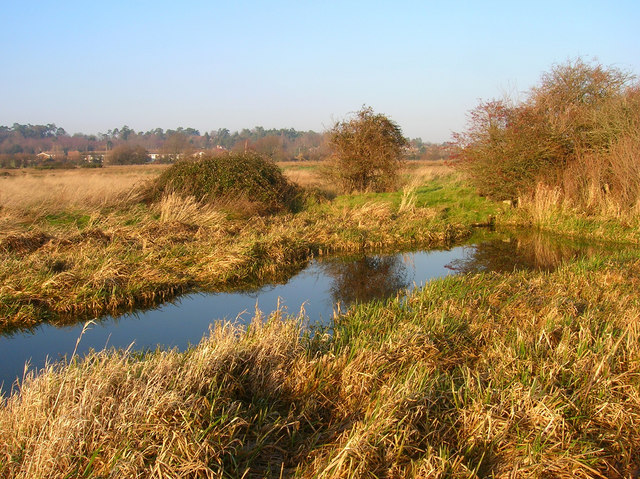
- Location of Waltham Brooks.
- Area of search: West Sussex
- Grid reference: TQ 025 157
- Interest: Biological
- Area: 47.4 hectares (117 acres)
- Notification date: 1987
- Location map: Magic Map

Waltham Brooks is a 47.4-hectare (117-acre) biological Site of Special Scientific Interest south-west of Pulborough in West Sussex. It is owned and managed by the Sussex Wildlife Trust and is part of the Arun Valley Ramsar site and Special Protection Area.

This is one of the few remaining areas of grazing marsh in the county and it has a rich variety of aquatic flora, including one nationally rare species, the small water-pepper. Many bird species winter at the site, including three in nationally important numbers, Bewick’s swan, teal and shoveler.

There is access to footpaths through the site.
