= Rye Harbour SSSI =

Nature reserve in East Sussex, England

Rye Harbour
- Site of Special Scientific Interest
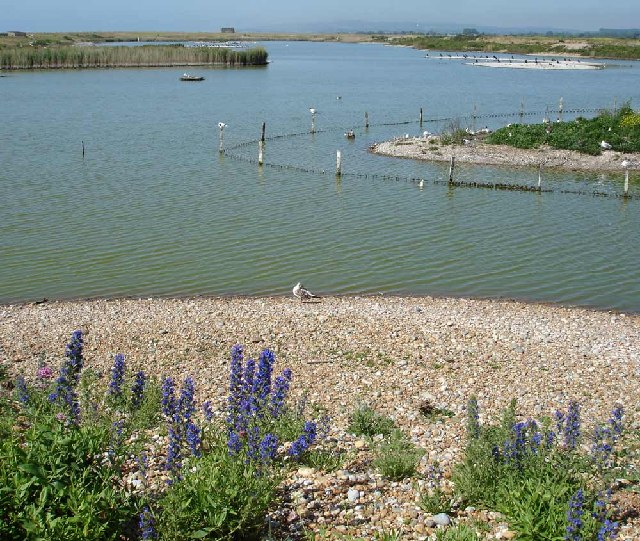

- Location within East Sussex
- Location of Rye Harbour.
- Area of search: East Sussex
- Grid reference: TQ935180
- Coordinates: 50.929°N 0.755°E
- Interest: Biological and Geological
- Area: 761.1 ha (1,881 acres)
- Notification date: 1953

Rye Harbour Site of Special Scientific Interest is a nature reserve located on the western side of the mouth of the River Rother at Rye Harbour, about 1 mile downstream from Rye East Sussex. It forms part of a wide network of SSSI's on the Kent-Sussex border that include the Romney & Walland Marsh, the Dungeness Peninsula, the lower Rother Valley and the Pett Levels.

It is a complicated site of both biological and geological interest. Varied habitats of shingle, saltmarsh and intertidal muds host a wide variety of flora and fauna. It forms the second largest area of shingle habitat in southern England, only surpassed in area by Dungeness. A much larger area is designated as the Rye Harbour Local Nature Reserve.

The Natural England citation for the site covers an area of 761 hectares, but the details page and map cover a small area of 5.6 hectares north of the nature reserve. The area covered by the map may have been transferred to the Dungeness, Romney Marsh and Rye Bay SSSI, but the citations are for the old SSSIs.
