= Senlac Hill =

Hill in East Sussex, England

Coordinates: 50°54′43″N 0°29′15″E

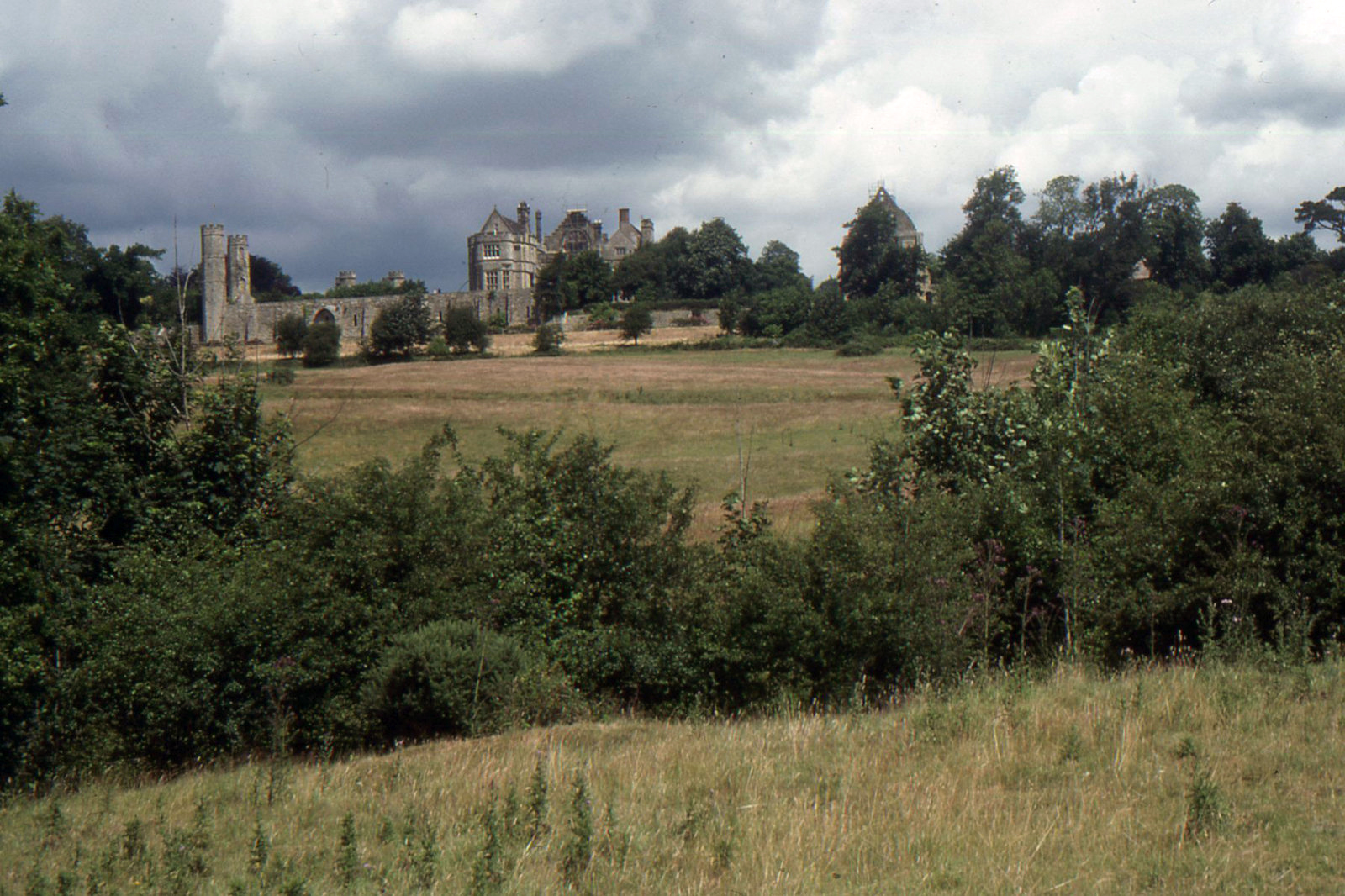
The Battle of Hastings was fought in 1066 at this location. The Saxon position was on top of the hill in which the Abbey later stood, and the Norman position was approximately where the photographer is standing.

Senlac Hill or Senlac Ridge is generally accepted as the location in which Harold Godwinson deployed his army for the Battle of Hastings on 14 October 1066. It is located near what is now the town of Battle, East Sussex. The name Senlac was popularised by Victorian historian E. A. Freeman, based solely on a description of the battle by the Anglo-Norman chronicler Orderic Vitalis. Freeman went on to suggest that the Normans nicknamed the area Blood lake as a pun on the English Sand lake.

It is probable that Orderic would have known the English name for Senlac, as he spent his early life in England since he had been born to an English mother. His education towards the end of his time in England was from an English monk. However, Freeman's hypothesis has been criticised by other historians since it relies purely on the evidence from Orderic. Orderic was born nine years after the Battle of Hastings, and earlier chroniclers did not use the name Senlac.

== Etymology ==
The name Senlac was introduced into English history by the Victorian historian E.A. Freeman, whose only source for it was the Anglo-Norman chronicler Orderic Vitalis. Freeman suggests that Senlac was the correct name of the Battle of Hastings site since the name of the hill was Senlac and was near a stream that was called Santlache. Orderic describes Harold Godwinson's forces as assembling for the battle ad locum, qui Senlac antiquitus vocabatur (Note: qui Senlac antiquitus vocabatur [assembled] "at the place that was formerly called Senlac") with the battle being fought in campo Senlac. (Note: in campo Senlac "in the field at Senlac")

Orderic was born in Atcham, Shropshire, England, the eldest son of a French priest, Odeler of Orléans and an English mother. When Orderic was five, his parents sent him to an English monk with the name of Siward, who kept a school in the Abbey of SS Peter and Paul, at Shrewsbury. Although Orderic moved to a monastery in Normandy at age ten, he seems to have maintained his links with England. Freeman concludes that it was possible for Orderic to have known the English name of the ridge. The Chronicle of Battle Abbey describes what it calls Malfosse, a large ditch that opened up during the course of the battle (some sources say after the battle (Note: The Malfosse incident is regarded as semilegendary, but it is generally suggested that after the battle, a contingent of Norman cavalry chased some English fleeing the battleground. The cavalry fell into a hidden ditch on top of one another with a tragic loss of life. For an analysis of the subject, see "The Battle of Hastings: Sources and Interpretations: Edited by Stephen Morillo".)) in which many soldiers of both sides fell and were trampled to death, the result being "rivulets of blood as far as one could see". In fact, there was a local legend that was maintained for centuries after the battle that the soil in the area turned red after a heavy rainfall. (Note: A more likely explanation is that the large ironstone content in the soil would, during heavy rainfall, cause the local River Asten's water to turn red.)

.."Asten (Note: In modern times the River Asten is more usually known as the Bulverhythe stream or Combe Haven.) once distained with native English blood;
Whose soil, when yet but wet with any little rain,
Doth blush, as put in mind of those there sadly slain,
When Hastings' harbour gave unto the Norman powers.
Whose name and honours now are denizened for ours.
That boding, ominous brook !"
From Michael Drayton's Poly-Olbion 1612

Freeman suggests that Senlac means Sand Lake in Old English, with the Norman conquerors calling it in French Sanguelac. Freeman regards the Norman use as a pun because the English translation of Sanguelac is "Blood Lake".

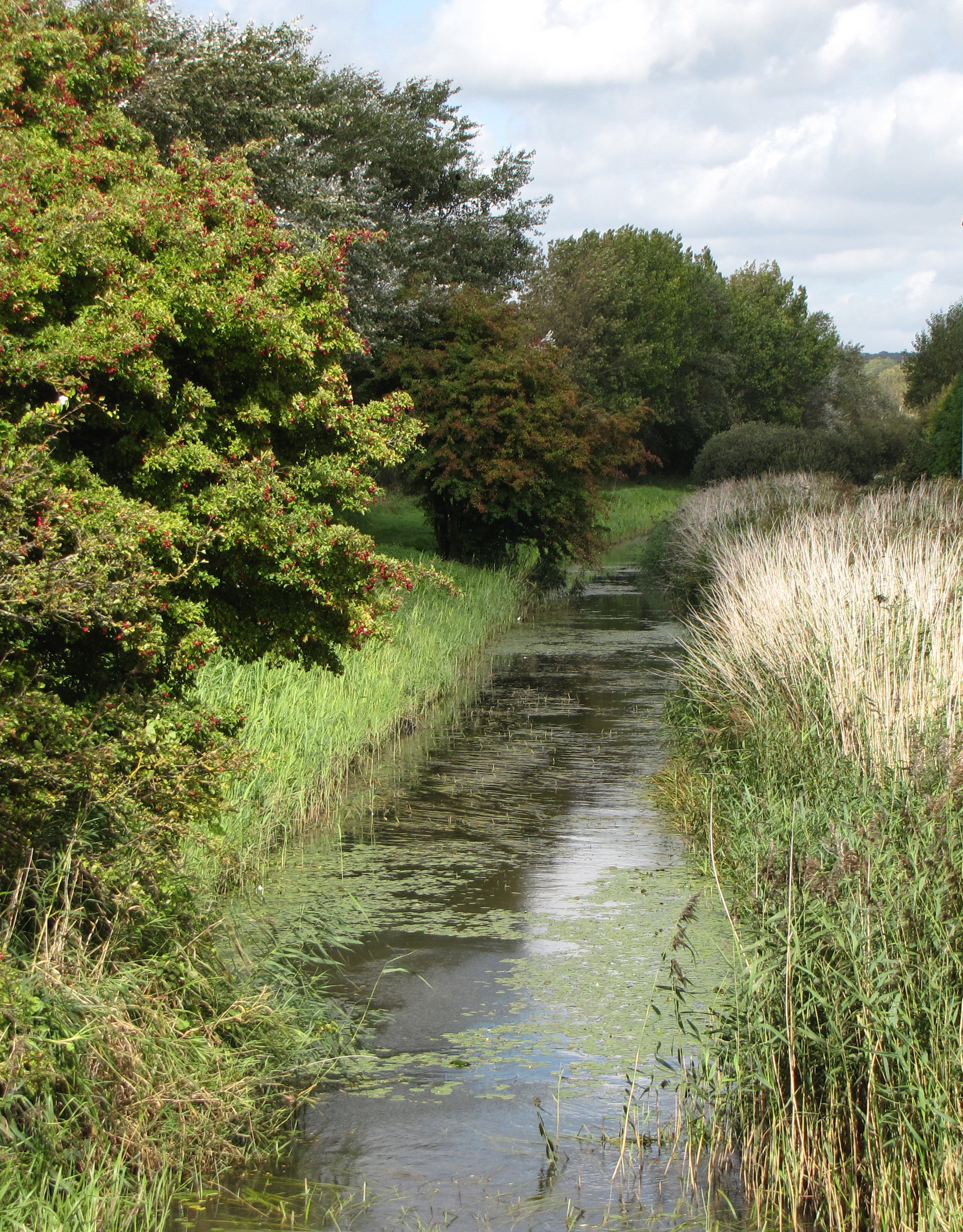
The River Asten near Sheepwash Bridge, Bulverhythe.

Several historians disagree with the Freeman analysis. J. Horace Round published his "Feudal England: Historical Studies on the XIth and XIIth Centuries" in 1895 in which he strongly criticises the Freeman view. (Note: J H Round not only criticised Freeman for his use of the name Senlac but also disagreed with many of Freeman's points about the battle itself.) He points out that Senlac was not an English word and was simply a fad, if not an invention of Orderic Vitalis. Norman chroniclers William of Jumièges and William of Poitiers, who were contemporary with the battle, did not record the site of the battle as Senlac, and the Chronicle of Battle Abbey simply records the location in Latin as Bellum (Battle). Later documents, however, indicate that the abbey had a tract of land known as Santlache (Sandlake) with the name Sandlake continuing for several centuries as a tithing in Battle.

Freeman considered what Orderic Vitalis called the battlefield, Senlac, may have been a corruption of the original Anglo-Saxon name. Other scholars have suggested that the Anglo-Saxon form would have been scen-leag meaning "beautiful meadow". A further possibility of Senlac comes from the iron rich sandstone deposits within the local area and the local Wealden iron industry that started before the Roman invasion and carried until the late 18th century. Some (Note: The "Saxon History" website provides an analysis of the name Senlac and a list of possible alternate locations for the battle.) have posited that the original Saxon name could have been Isen-Lacu, which means "iron pond". (Note: There is little evidence of iron working in the area during the Saxon period.) It is possible that the meaning was changed when translated into Latin. The argument goes that if the original name was Iron Pond, then the accepted location for Senlac Hill is wrong.
