= Flatropers Wood =

Nature reserve in East Sussex, England

Coordinates: 50.980°N 0.651°E

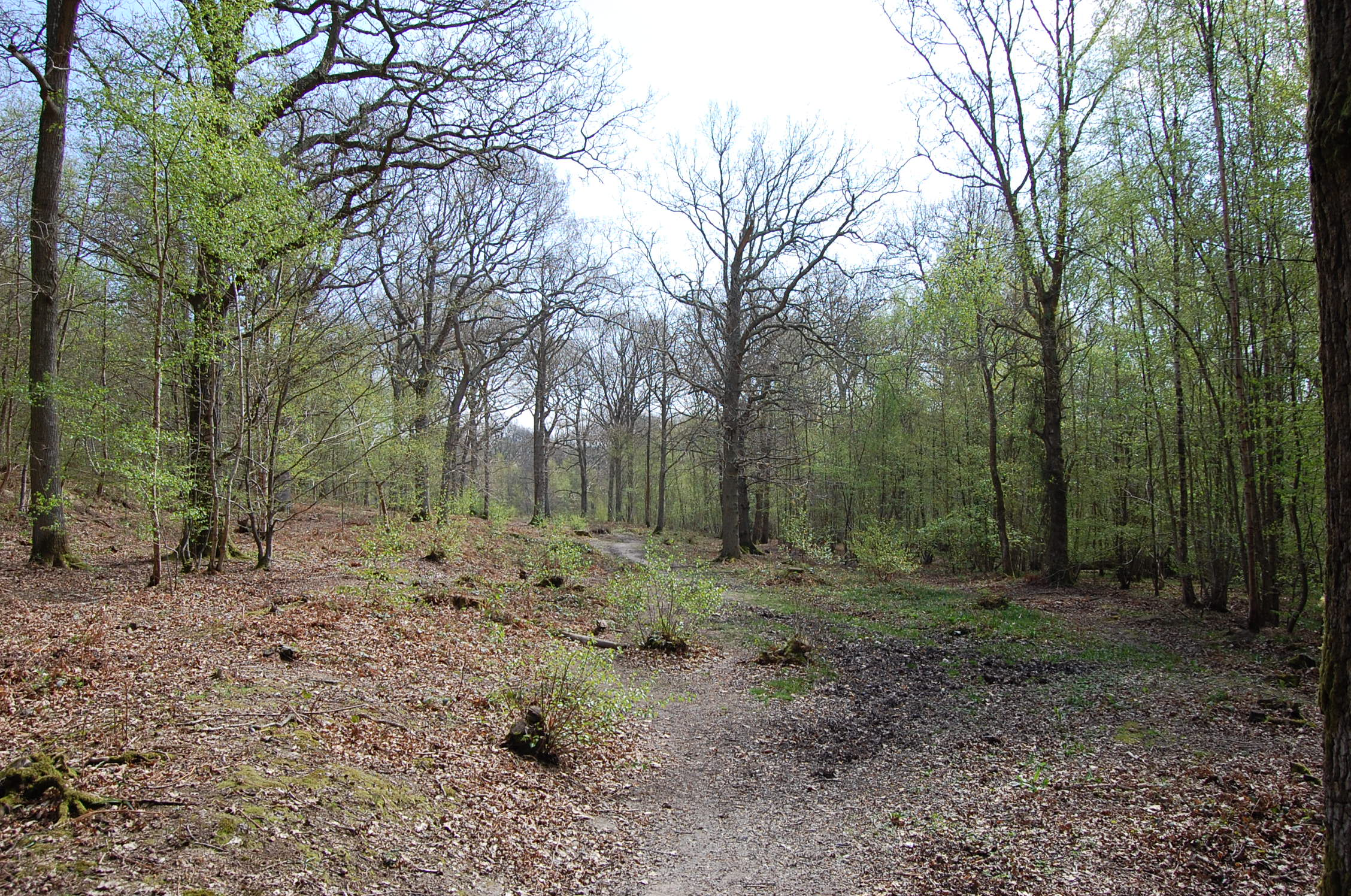
- Interactive map of Flatropers Wood
- Type: Nature reserve
- Location: Rye, East Sussex
- OS grid: TQ862234
- Area: 38 hectares (94 acres)
- Manager: Sussex Wildlife Trust

Flatropers Wood is a 38-hectare (94-acre) nature reserve in Rye in East Sussex. It is managed by the Sussex Wildlife Trust.

The wood is mainly oak and birch, but there are also areas of sweet chestnut and former plantations of Scots pine and beech. The site is notable for its invertebrates, with almost 500 species of moths recorded and the rare oak mining-bee.
