= The Mens =

Protected area in West Sussex, England

Coordinates: 51.003°N 0.542°W

- Site of Special Scientific Interest
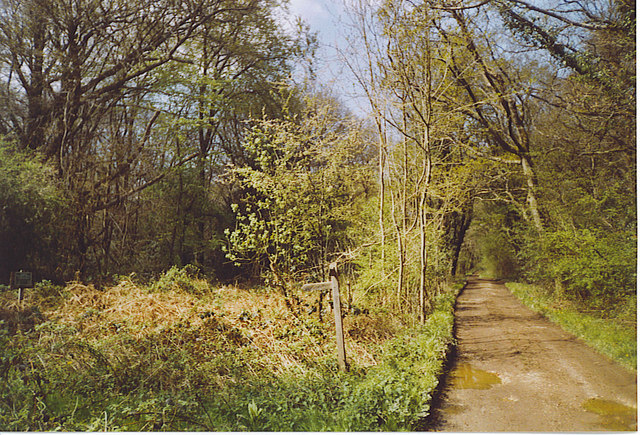
- Location of The Mens.
- Area of search: West Sussex
- Grid reference: TQ 024 236
- Interest: Biological
- Area: 205.2 hectares (507 acres)
- Notification date: 1986
- Location map: Magic Map

The Mens is a 205.2-hectare (507-acre) biological Site of Special Scientific Interest west of Billingshurst in West Sussex. It is a Nature Conservation Review site, Grade I and a Special Area of Conservation. An area of 166 hectares (410 acres) south of the A272 road is managed as a nature reserve by the Sussex Wildlife Trust.

This large area of woodland has diverse breeding birds and rich lichen and fungal floras. There are many rare beetles and a fly which is endangered with extinction, Chelostoma curvinervis. All three British species of woodpecker breed on the site, together with other woodland species such as nightingales, woodcocks and wood warblers.
