= Henfield =

Village and parish in West Sussex, England

Coordinates: 50.933°N 0.277°W

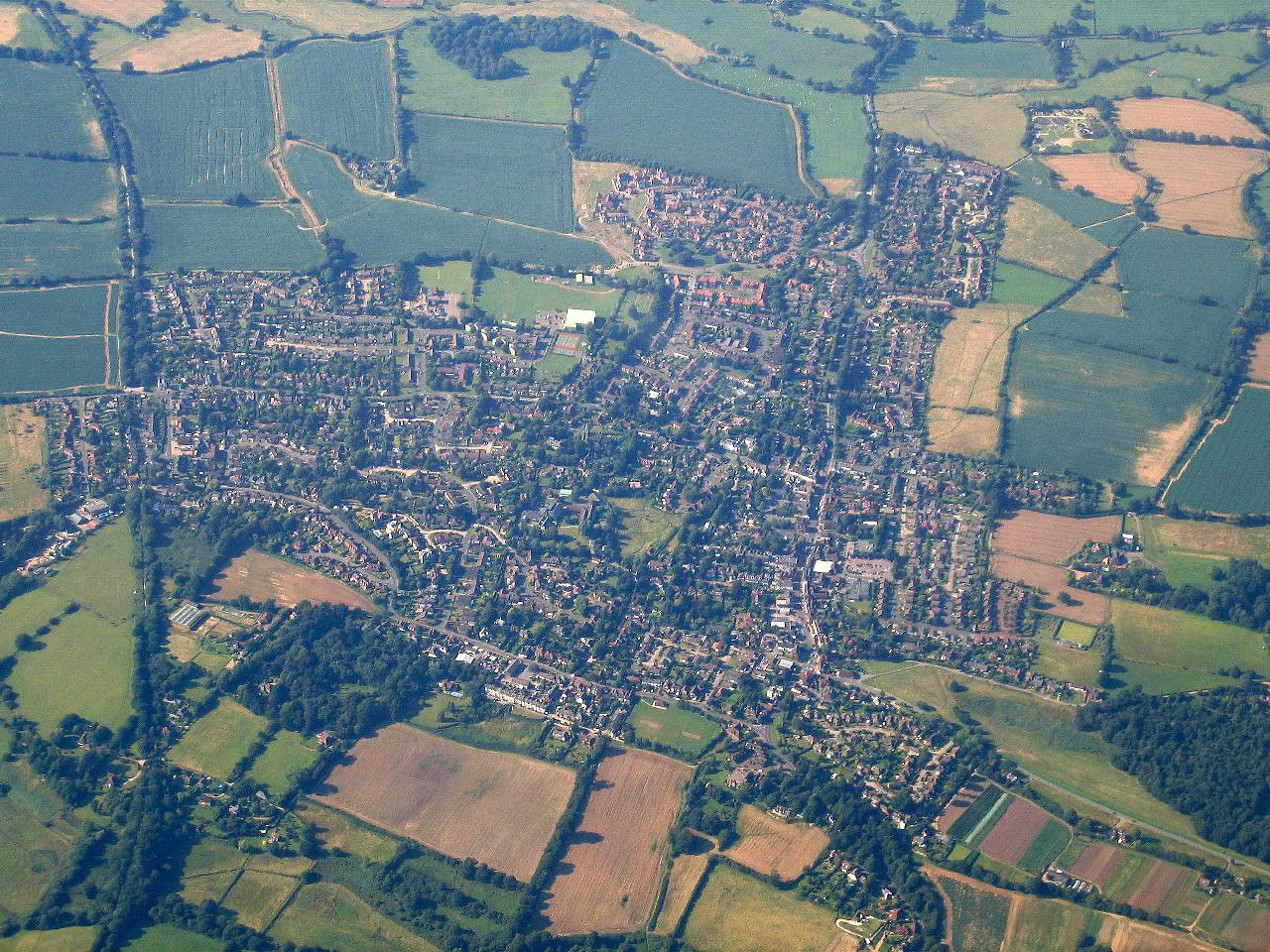
- Henfield from the air

- Location within West Sussex
- Area: 17.35 km^{2} (6.70 sq mi)
- Population: 5,012 2001 Census; 5,349 (2011 Census)
  - Density: 289/km^{2} (750/sq mi)
- OS grid reference: TQ215162
  - London: 40 miles (64 km) N
- Civil parish: Henfield
- District: Horsham
- Shire county: West Sussex
- Region: South East
- Country: England
- Sovereign state: United Kingdom
- Post town: HENFIELD
- Postcode district: BN5
- Dialling code: 01273
- Police: Sussex
- Fire: West Sussex
- Ambulance: South East Coast
- UK Parliament: Arundel and South Downs
- Website: Parish Council

Henfield is a large village and civil parish in the Horsham District of West Sussex, England. It lies 41 miles (66 km) south of London, 12 miles (19 km) northwest of Brighton, and 30 miles (48 km) east northeast of the county town of Chichester at the road junction of the A281 and A2037. The parish has a land area of 4,285 acres (1,734.1 ha). In the 2001 census 5,012 people lived in 2,153 households, of whom 2,361 were economically active. Other nearby towns include Burgess Hill to the east and Shoreham-by-Sea to the south. The population at the 2011 Census was 5,349.

Just west of the village, the two branches of the River Adur, the western Adur and the eastern Adur, meet at Betley Bridge. From Henfield the Adur flows on into the English Channel at Shoreham-by-Sea.

Henfield was already a large village, of 52 households, at the time of Domesday (1086).

== Facilities ==
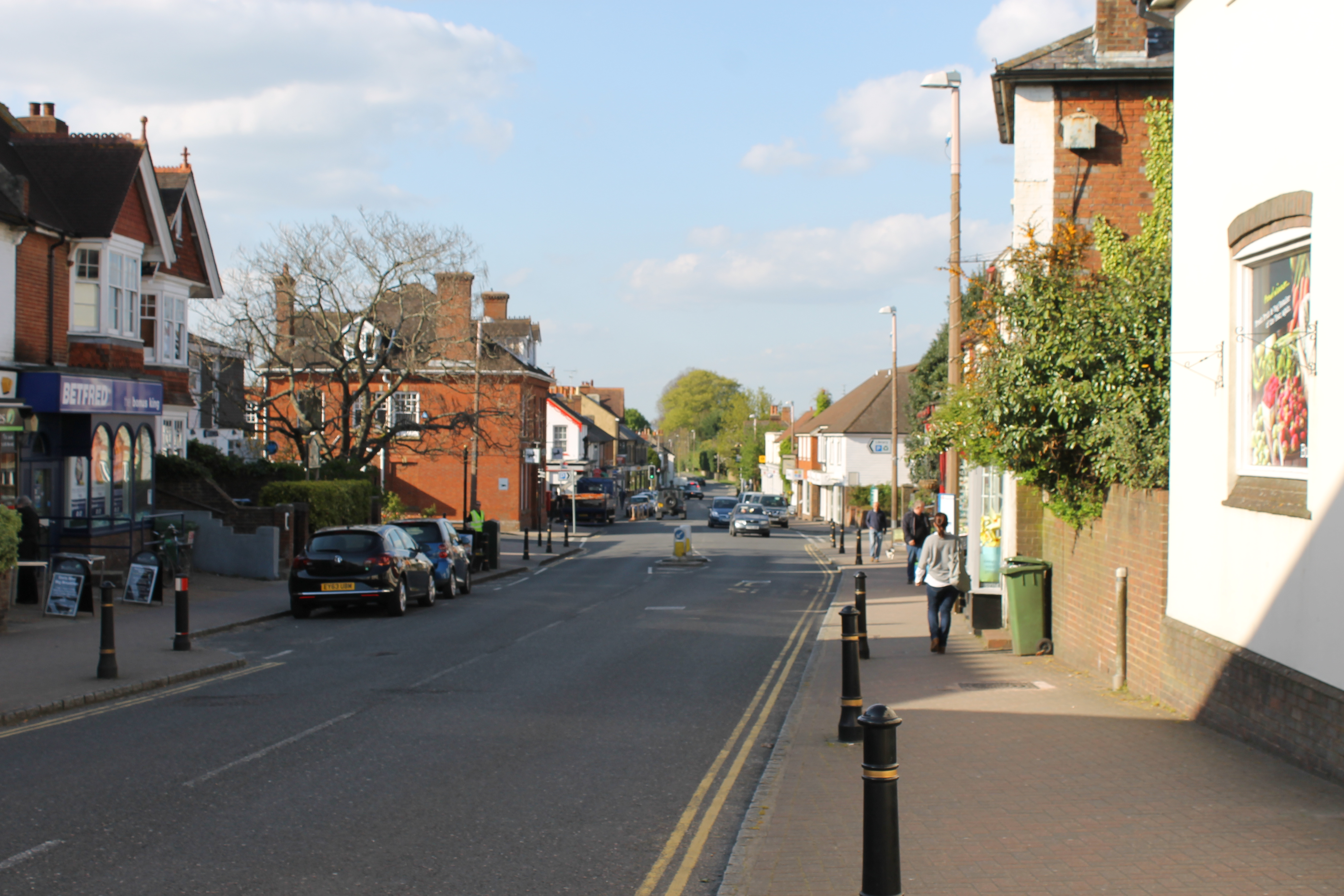
Looking north along the High Street

Henfield has an old centre.

It has a modern village hall just off the High Street, the 13th-century St Peter's church, old inns, a wide common, and many houses in private ownership.

There is a fire station, part of the West Sussex Fire Brigade, equipped with a single fire engine.

Henfield has one of the oldest cricket clubs in the world, dating back to 1771. A women's team was formed from 2006.

Henfield also officially has the oldest Scout group in the country (1st Henfield), dating from 1907. When officially registered in 1908 there were 36 scouts in the group. The group was started in winter 1907-8 by Audrey Wade, whose brother, A. G. Wade, had met Robert Baden-Powell when both were travelling to the UK from Africa when they were in the army. A. G. Wade later had several administrative roles in the developing Scout movement.

To the south is Woods Mill, a restored mill, now the headquarters of the Sussex Wildlife Trust, its attractions including an extensive nature trail.

South of the village on the road towards Small Dole is a business park containing the Royal Mail Delivery Office, the Etwars and small businesses.

There is a theatre company which is held in the village hall.

=== Sports facilities ===
Henfield Leisure Centre at Northcroft has a sports hall and fitness suite. There is a skate park located next to the sports centre. Near to the leisure centre is Henfield tennis club, founded in 1920.

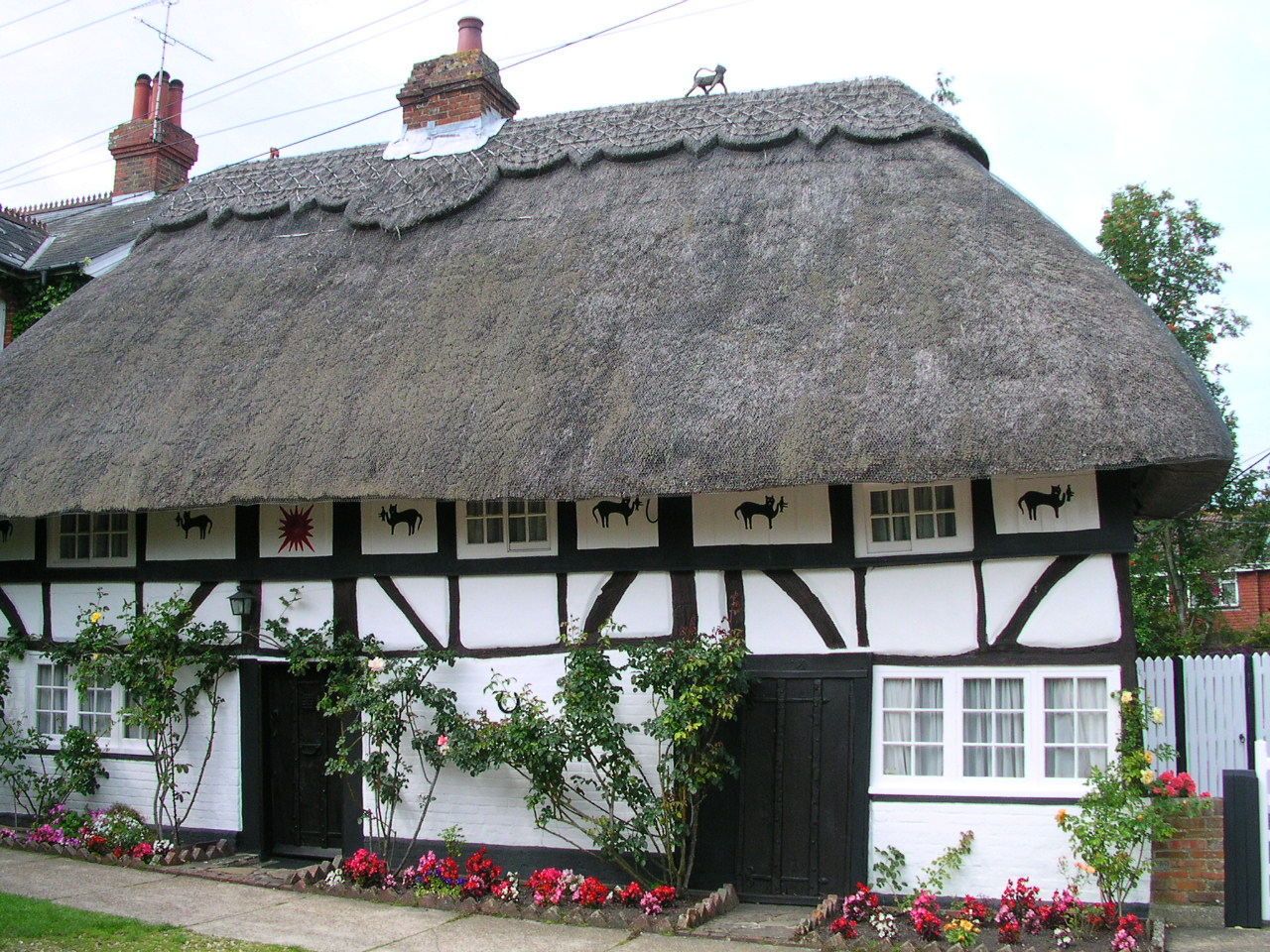
The Cat House

=== The Cat House ===
The Cat House is at Pinchnose Green, so called because there used to be a tannery nearby and the process of tanning produces unpleasant odours. This house was once owned by George Ward who had a canary. This bird was killed by a cat belonging to the Anglican Canon Nathaniel Woodard who lived at nearby Martyn Lodge. So incensed was Ward that he painted his house with pictures of a cat holding a bird that would be seen by the canon every time he walked past on his way to the church. He also rigged up strings of sea shells to rattle, and a black figure would appear at a small window called the zulu hole when the hapless canon was seen approaching.

=== Henfield Museum ===
Started in the 1930s, Henfield Museum moved to its current location in the Henfield Hall in 1974. It contains collections related to local events and people from mesolithic times onwards as well as local natural history. It also contains materials linked to local people such as Marjorie Baker and William Borrer and enterprises including the Allen-Brown Violet Nurseries and Henfield railway station (closed in 1966). It is run by the Friends of Henfield Museum and the Henfield Parish Council.

== Notable areas ==
Notable areas in Henfield

Henfield is home to the Sussex Wildlife Trust headquarters, four commons, brooks, moors and tributaries to the River Adur.

=== Henfield's Commons ===
Henfield Parish Council supports four Commons: Henfield Common, Broadmere Common, Oreham Common and the Tanyard. All are ecologically rich and support a diverse range of wildlife.

==== Henfield Common ====
Henfield Common (TQ 219 156) is at the southern end of the High Street. It covers almost 20 hectares, including a cricket pitch, two football fields, rich marshland and heathy grassland. It is botanically important and supports a wide range of wildlife. Its main character historically was that of a moor and three quarters of its special plants grow best on marsh or wet ground and the other quarter on heath and grasslands. In June and July the southern marsh orchid can be seen amongst the common spotted orchid. In the late summer to the south of the marsh, the grass can be tinted purple by the devil's-bit scabious. There are surviving patches of wild chamomile on the cricket pitch. In autumn, there are many species of field fungi including waxcaps and fairy clubs on the heath. The natural environment supports much fauna and conservation groups monitor the area.

Despite the historical botanical richness and beauty of the common, many species have already been lost from the area since the drainage ditch was dug in 1886, making the area less wet. Lost species include small fleabane, starfruit, mudwort, lesser marshwort, bogbean, sundew, marsh cinquefoil, beaked and white sedges, chaffweed and bog-myrtle. Recent changes in the management of the Common mean even more species have been lost or are rapidly disappearing including dwarf gorse, common heather and petty whin. In 2017 disaster struck for the future of the botanical richness and the accompanying, often unseen, wildlife of the Common when the football pitches were sprayed with herbicide and ploughed destroying the glorious chamomile lawn and the recovering marsh vegetation. In the process heath and southern marsh orchids, marsh pennywort and the only patch of scarce adder's tongue fern were killed. If any of the botanical richness of the area is going to persist, the marsh will benefit from re-wetting and the heath will benefit from grazing, as well as mowing.

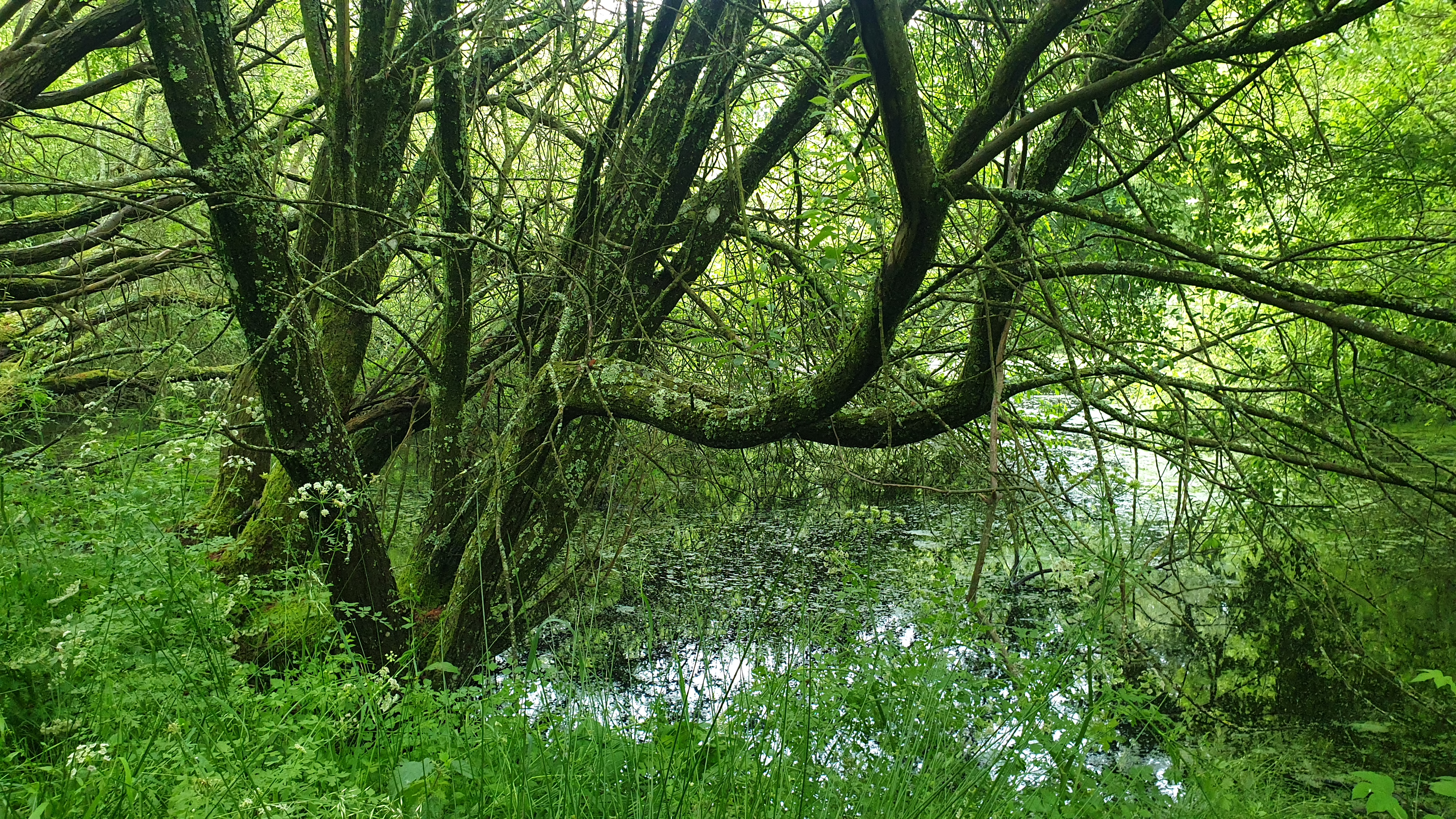
Broadmere common, Henfield, West Sussex

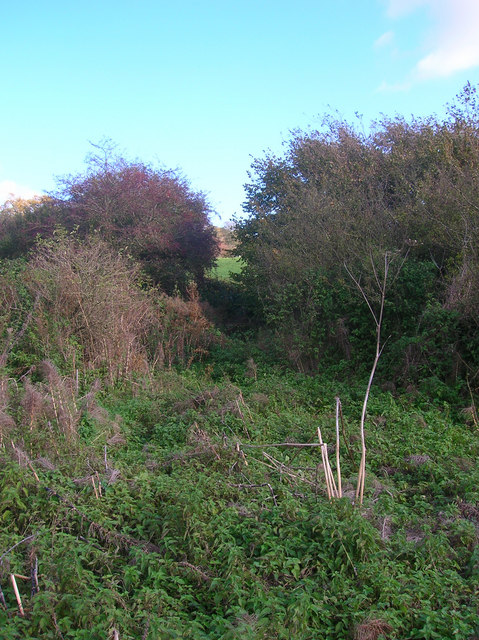
Footpath to Broadmere Common - geograph

==== Broadmere Common ====
Broadmere Common (TQ 216 150) is at the eastern end of Dag Brooks and is almost 5 hectares. The name derives from the old English term "broad mere" meaning broad lake due its wetness. It has many pools, many of which were originally dug for the clay needed for brick-making. It has many precious plants though including yellow flag, goat willow, meadowsweet, occasional marsh woundwort and even scarce meadow brome. In the ponds there are water mint, greater bird's-foot-trefoil, common fleabane and swan mussels. Once it was famed by botanists for even rarer local plants including small fleabane, starfruit, mudwort and lesser marshwort, but of these only the lesser marshwort still exists and its survival is threatened by the invasive Australian swamp stonecrop. Palmate newts are present in the ponds and the Common can still support a number of Birds of Conservation Concern including nightingale and cuckoo, and even lesser spotted woodpecker has been seen there. The richness of the Common fauna and flora will benefit from having the ponds cleared and the land grazed.

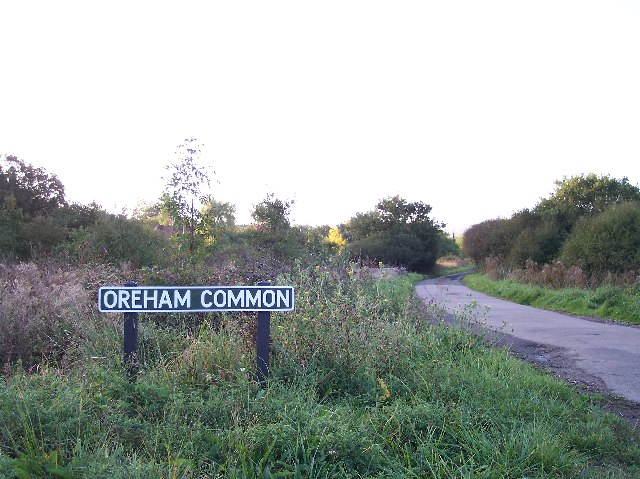
Oreham Common - geograph

==== Oreham Common ====
Oreham Common (TQ 222 139) is almost 6 hectares. In Old English ora means flat top hill and hamm means "a patch of flat, low-lying alluvial land beside a stream". Horn Lane runs through its centre, which is part of the longest section of the Greensand Way Roman road that still functions as a road (around 1 mile). It is rich in flora such as common meadow-rue, sneezewort, pepper saxifrage, greater bird's-foot-trefoil, adder's tongue fern and common spotted orchids, many grasses and even more herbaceous plants. Palmate newts are present in the ponds and the Common can support a number of Birds of Conservation Concern including nightingale and turtle dove and butterflies such as purple hairstreak and brown argus. Like Broadmere Common the fauna and flora will benefit from having the ponds cleared and the land grazed. Additional traffic calming measures will help improve the area.

=== Woods Mill ===
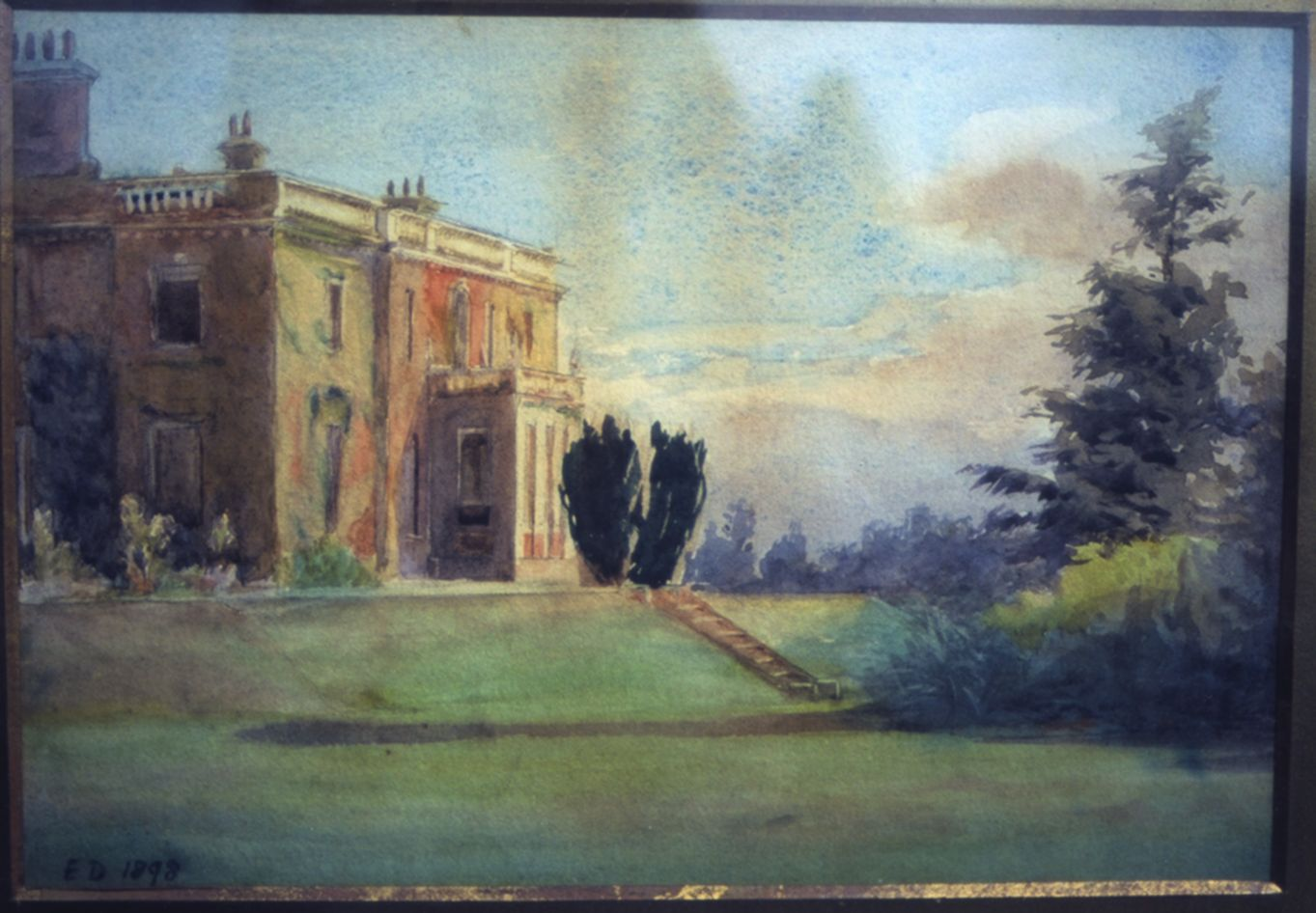
Conyboro1898

Woods Mill is the headquarters of the Sussex Wildlife Trust and an environmental education centre. It is an area of 47 acres. There is an ancient woodland, a lake, streams and unimproved meadows with wild hedgerows.

=== Henfield Brooks ===
Henfield brooks (TQ 203 153) are to the east of the River Adur and to the south west of the village. The fields flood regularly during winter rains. In spring the brooks are full of life with marsh frogs, lapwings, reed buntings and traditionally the call of the cuckoo, although that is becoming rarer. In summer the ditches support scarce plants such as greater water parsnip (an aquatic plant which has seen a massive reduction recently and now only occurs in around 50 sites in England), water dropwort, arrowhead and flowering rush. The area can support common snipe, lesser spotted woodpecker and little owl.

=== Henfield Moors ===
Between Henfield Common and Woodmancote Place is a low plain with fine unimproved wet rush pastures known as The Moors. The ground is made from the Sussex Gault Clay. gorse and birch line the fences and the two ditches support bog pondweed. Behind the Swains Farm shop, in the pony-grazed western fields there is the largest population of (and best managed) meadow thistle in Sussex. You can also find heath spotted orchid, lousewort, tormentil, ragged-robin, marsh pennywort and at least six sedges.

=== The Pokerlee stream ===
The Pokerlee Stream is a lovely tributary of the Adur that runs through the Beeding, Horton, and Dag brooks, south of Henfield, Nep Town and The Pools meadows and ends up going through a tiny triangular bluebell wood on the north side of Horn Lane. It separates the Wealden Clay of Oreham from the fertile Greensand ridge's large arable fields. The best access is from the south of Henfield. Like many of the steams of east of the Adur, parts have been straightened, partly for mill leats and partly for land drainage. There was a farmstead and barns of the same name (TQ 204 144). Only the farm pond and a little holloway leading down to the Horton brooks survives.

The name, Pokerlee, is first recorded (indirectly) in 1327. The first element might be the word poker, 'hobgoblin', which is of Scandinavian origin and survives as the Durham place-name 'Pokerley'. However, as this is a southern usage this is not very likely. Thus, it could alternatively mean "one who has to do with a poke or bag", which survives in its diminutive form as 'pocket' and in the saying 'a pig in a poke' (sack) which refers to something bought without inspection or through a confidence trick. The second element of word, lee, refers to a meadow or a clearing.

== History ==
Henfield was the home of Colonel Henry Bishop, who was appointed Postmaster General by King Charles II in January 1660–61. Bishop devised the first type of postmark used in England, which is known to collectors as a Bishop mark. His invention was commemorated in 1963, on the occasion of an exhibition by Henfield Stamp Club. A special date stamp, which included the wording HENRY BISHOP'S VILLAGE, was used. Bishop is buried in Henfield churchyard.

The eighteenth century botanist William Borrer, who specialised in the flora of the British Isles, was born and died in Henfield.

When the British government introduced the Cat and Mouse Act in 1913, local Suffragette Elizabeth Robins used her 15th century farmhouse at Backsettown, near Henfield, that she shared with Octavia Wilberforce, as a retreat for suffragettes recovering from hunger strike. Robins was the first president of the Henfield Women's Institute which was founded in 1917.
