= Selwyns Wood =

Nature reserve in East Sussex, England

Coordinates: 50.963°N 0.207°E

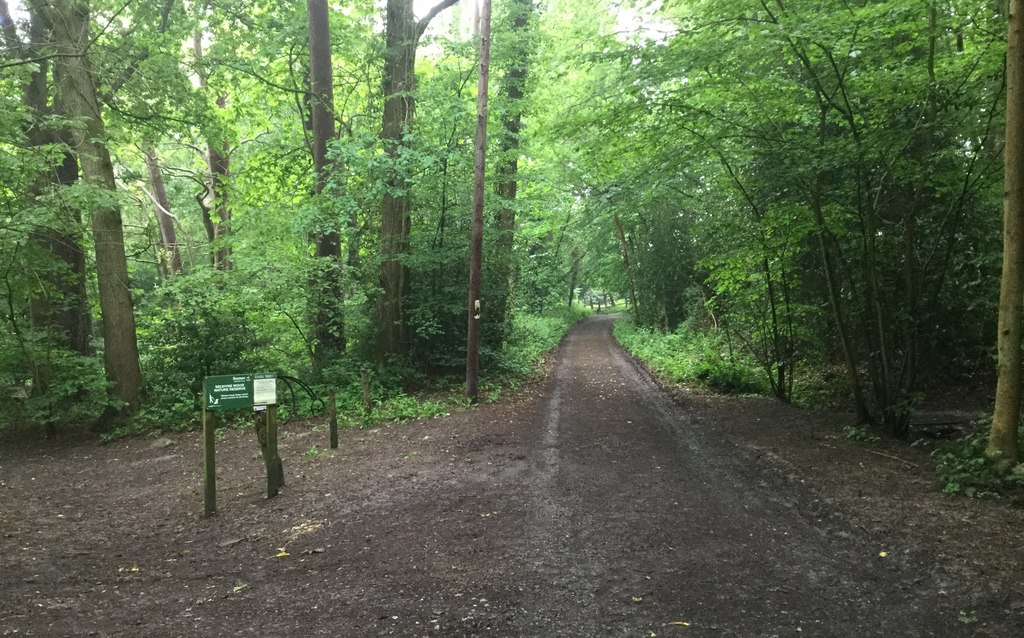
- Interactive map of Selwyns Wood
- Type: Nature reserve
- Location: Heathfield, East Sussex
- OS grid: TQ551205
- Area: 11 hectares (27 acres)
- Manager: Sussex Wildlife Trust

Selwyns Wood is a 11-hectare (27-acre) nature reserve west of Heathfield in Sussex. It is managed by the Sussex Wildlife Trust.

This reserve has woodland with extensive sweet chestnut, a stream in a narrow valley and an area of heather. There is a variety of breeding woodland birds, including willow warblers, chiffchaffs, nuthatches and marsh tits.
