= Brickfield Meadow =

English nature preserve

Coordinates: 51.019°N 0.097°E

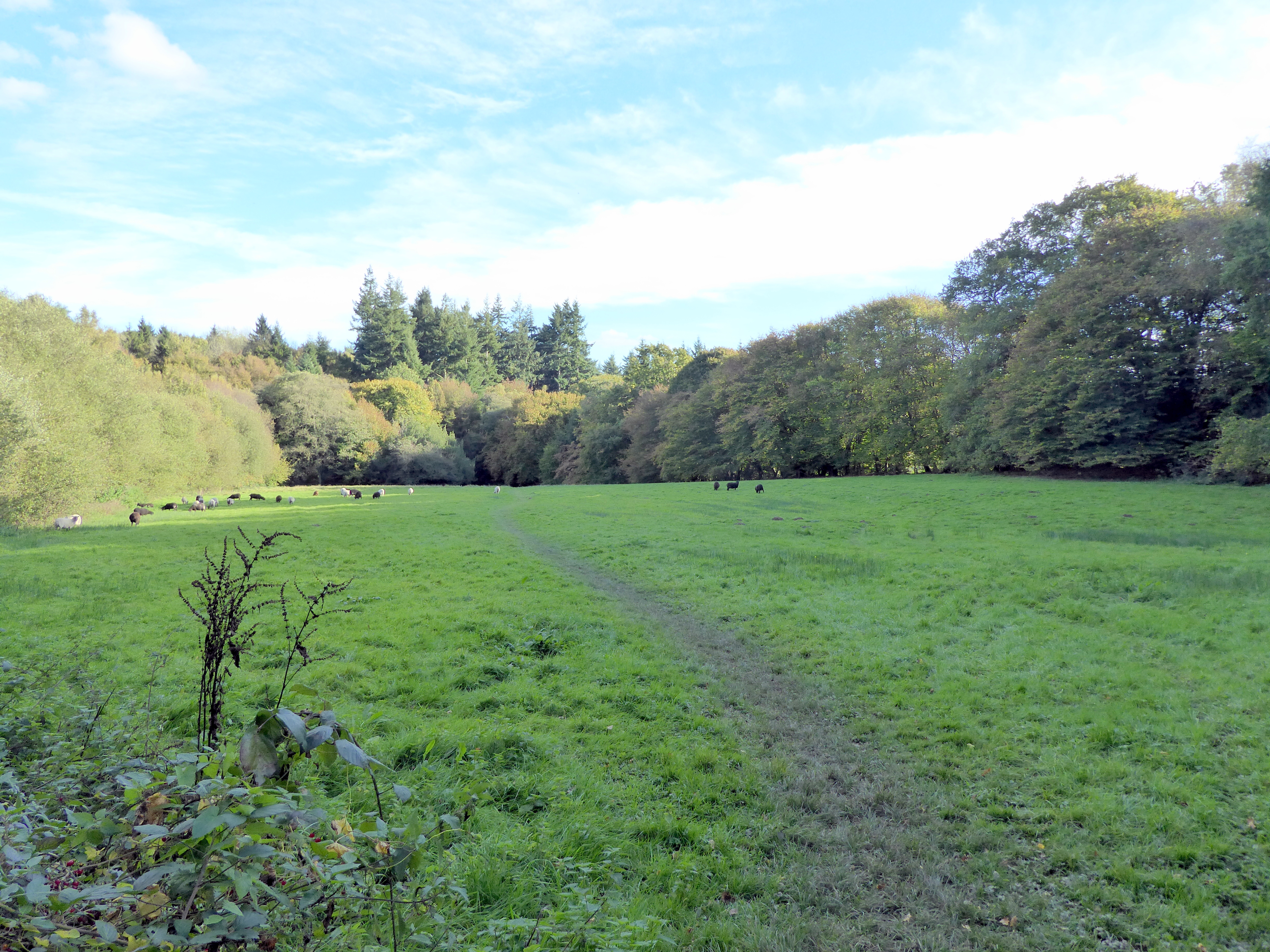
- Interactive map of Brickfield Meadow
- Type: Nature reserve
- Location: Maresfield, East Sussex
- OS grid: TQ472265
- Area: 1.4 hectares (3.5 acres)
- Manager: Sussex Wildlife Trust

Brickfield Meadow is a 1.4-hectare (3.5-acre) nature reserve north of Maresfield in East Sussex. It is managed by the Sussex Wildlife Trust.

This wildflower rich meadow has been traditionally managed for many years by cutting in the summer and grazing later in the year. Flowering plants include Dyer’s greenweed, devil's-bit scabious, bitter-vetch and zigzag clover. It is one of the best places in the county for the chimney sweeper moth.

The Wealdway long distance footpath goes through the reserve.
