= Woods Mill =

Nature reserve in West Sussex, England

Coordinates: 50.910°N 0.269°W

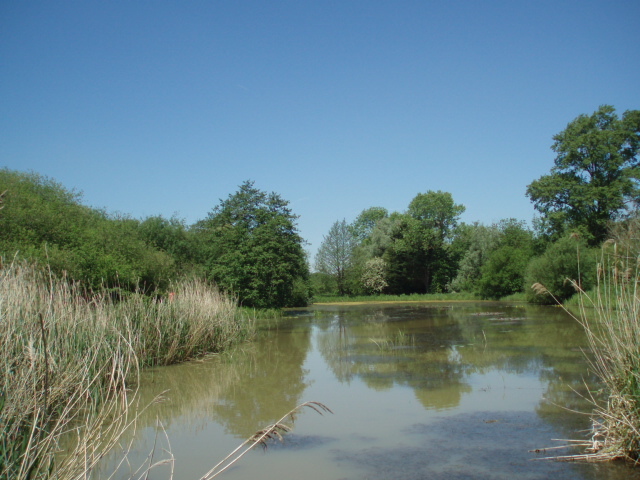
- Interactive map of Woods Mill
- Type: Nature reserve
- Location: Henfield, West Sussex
- OS grid: TQ218137
- Area: 19 hectares (47 acres)
- Manager: Sussex Wildlife Trust

Woods Mill is a 19-hectare (47-acre) nature reserve south of Henfield in West Sussex. It is managed by the Sussex Wildlife Trust.

This is the headquarters of the trust and an environmental education centre. The main feature of the nature reserve is a lake, which has many damselflies and dragonflies, such as the scarce chaser and downy emerald. There is also a large area of ancient woodland, with oak, silver birch and coppiced hazel.

The Reserve celebrated its 50th anniversary in 2018 with the support of Scottish Power.
