= Brighton to Newhaven Cliffs =

Part of south coast of England

Coordinates: 50.796°N 0.029°W

- Site of Special Scientific Interest
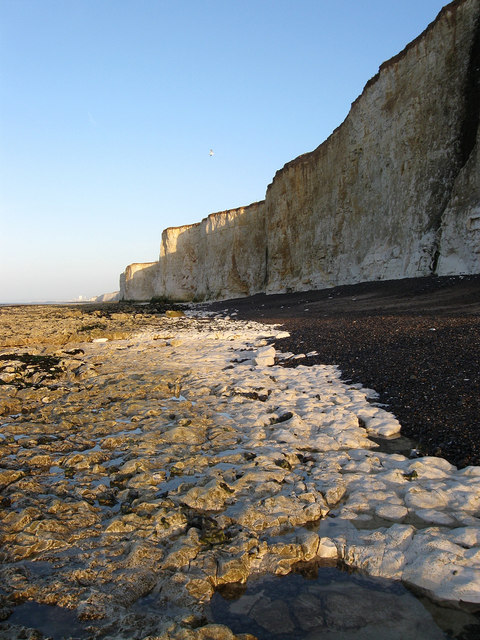
- Location of Brighton to Newhaven Cliffs.
- Area of search: East Sussex
- Grid reference: TQ 390 014
- Interest: Biological; Geological
- Area: 165.4 hectares (409 acres)
- Notification date: 1986
- Location map: Magic Map

Brighton to Newhaven Cliffs is a 165.4-hectare (409-acre) biological and geological Site of Special Scientific Interest and Geological Conservation Review site, which stretches along the coast between Brighton and Newhaven in East Sussex. An area of 16.4 hectares (41 acres) is the Castle Hill, Newhaven Local Nature Reserve

== Geology ==
Brighton to Newhaven Cliffs provides the best and most extensive exposure of an important chronological fossil site in England. The gentle folding and the ease of access to the cliff exposures make this an important collecting site for faunas of the upper Santonian and lower Campanian. It is an increasingly important reference section for the Upper Cretaceous. Black Rock is a key for the study of Quaternary Stratigraphy and has attracted scientific interest for over 150 years. The modern sea cliff at Black Rock obliquely intersects a fossil cliff and abrasion platform cut in the Upper Chalk.

The platform is overlain by raised beach deposits of sand and shingle which contain shell fragments which amongst other methods have given the beach and cliff a general date from the second half of the last (Ipswichian) interglacial. The angle between the beach and the old cliff is filled by great quantities of coarse chalk rubble apparently derived from the weathering and erosion of the cliff in Devensian times. Chalk muds and fine chalk gravel and grit, are banked against the rubble on the west and may represent fan deposits. The muds contain appreciable quantities of loess and are overlain by further, coarser solifluction deposits. The chalk rubble and solifluction deposits are particularly notable for their fossil remains of many Devensian mammals, including Elephas primigenius, Tichorhinus antiquitatus and Equus caballus.

The landforms, stratigraphy and mammal remains at Black Rock provide an extremely valuable record of former sea levels and changing environmental conditions during the last few glaciations which have affected this area, Southern England, unlike much of the rest of the UK has not been affected by full scale glaciation. An area of the cliff at Saltdean provides probably the finest example of conjugate normal faults in the Chalk of southern England. This exposure of Upper Chalk lies on the southern flank of the Weald anticline, an upward flexure of the crust and the major geological structure of south-eastern England. The faults run in a north-northeasterly direction, at right angles to the trend of the anticline. These structures were probably formed by stretching of the crust parallel to the axis of the anticline during an episode of crustal compression in the mid Tertiary. The formation of the Wealden Anticline is related to the formation of the Alpine Chain to the South.

Along much of the cliffed coast between Brighton and Newhaven (and beyond to Eastbourne), frost involution structures can be seen in the upper meter of the chalk cliff. These involutions appear as repeated 'U' (festoon) shaped structures and date from the Devensisn (last glacial period). Frost heaving broke up the sub-surface sedimentary layers of chalk turning small slabs into a more and more upright orientation towards the surface, to be covered by present day soil. The centre of the 'U' structure is a fill of finer chalk and sands giving a more orange / yellow appearance. These structures have a polygonal surface manifestation which can be revealed by stripping away turf and soil. Slope angle appears to have had an effect on their formation. Where the gradient exceeds 20 degrees solifluction appears to have been a more dominant process preventing their formation. This may link to the patterned ground features of stone nets becoming elongated by gradient resulting in stone stripes as seen in modern periglacial environment and in relic locations such as Dartmoor.

== Undercliff Walk ==
The Undercliff Walk is a 4.5 km (2.8 mi) path at the foot of the cliffs from Black Rock, Brighton to Saltdean. Opened in 1933, this seafront route is popular with walkers and cyclists. However, Brighton & Hove City Council has often had to close it after rockfalls such as during the winters of 2000/01, 2012/13, 2020/21 and 2022/23. Netting and other devices have been placed on parts of the cliffs known to be unstable to prevent rocks from falling on to the path.
