= Marjorie Baker =

British photographer (1912–2004)

Marjorie Baker (13 November 1912 – 9 November 2004) was a British photographer who documented the changing life of Henfield, Sussex, England from the mid to late twentieth century.

== Career ==
Baker took photographs for over 60 years that recorded the way of life around her in the rural Sussex village of Henfield. She learnt professional photography as an apprentice to the photographer Margaret Ellsmoor, who was based in London but had a studio at Onslow House, Brighton Road, in Worthing and showed specimen work at 13 Chapel Road. Baker began to work from Henfield in 1932. She converted space in a coach-house to a studio in 1938, where she used large format cameras throughout her career. She also photographed outdoors at local events and festivals. Some of her photographs were used for postcards by businesses and the local church. Some of her portraits were shown in the Institute of British Photographers exhibitions in London.

The photographs that she was commissioned to take often showed a story as well as being technically interesting. They now also provide images of social history.

During the Second World War Baker and her four assistants photographed weddings as well as portraits for the servicemen based in the region. One of her popular photographs showed a baby with an expression reminiscent of Winston Churchill.

She stopped taking photographs in 1996. In the last years of her life she worked with museum curators to document the photographs.

== Legacy ==
Around 200 of her photographic prints are in Horsham Museum and 15,000 and 60,000 negatives are in Henfield Museum.

== Personal life ==
Baker was born 13 November 1912 in Henfield, Sussex where her parents, Albert and Ethel (née Thrift) Baker, had a butcher's shop. She was educated at Steyne boarding school in Worthing. She married Stephen Tidey (died 1999) in 1940 and they had two sons together. She died in Henfield on 9 November 2004.
