= Church Wood and Robsack Wood =

Protected area in East Sussex, England

Coordinates: 50.872°N 0.534°E

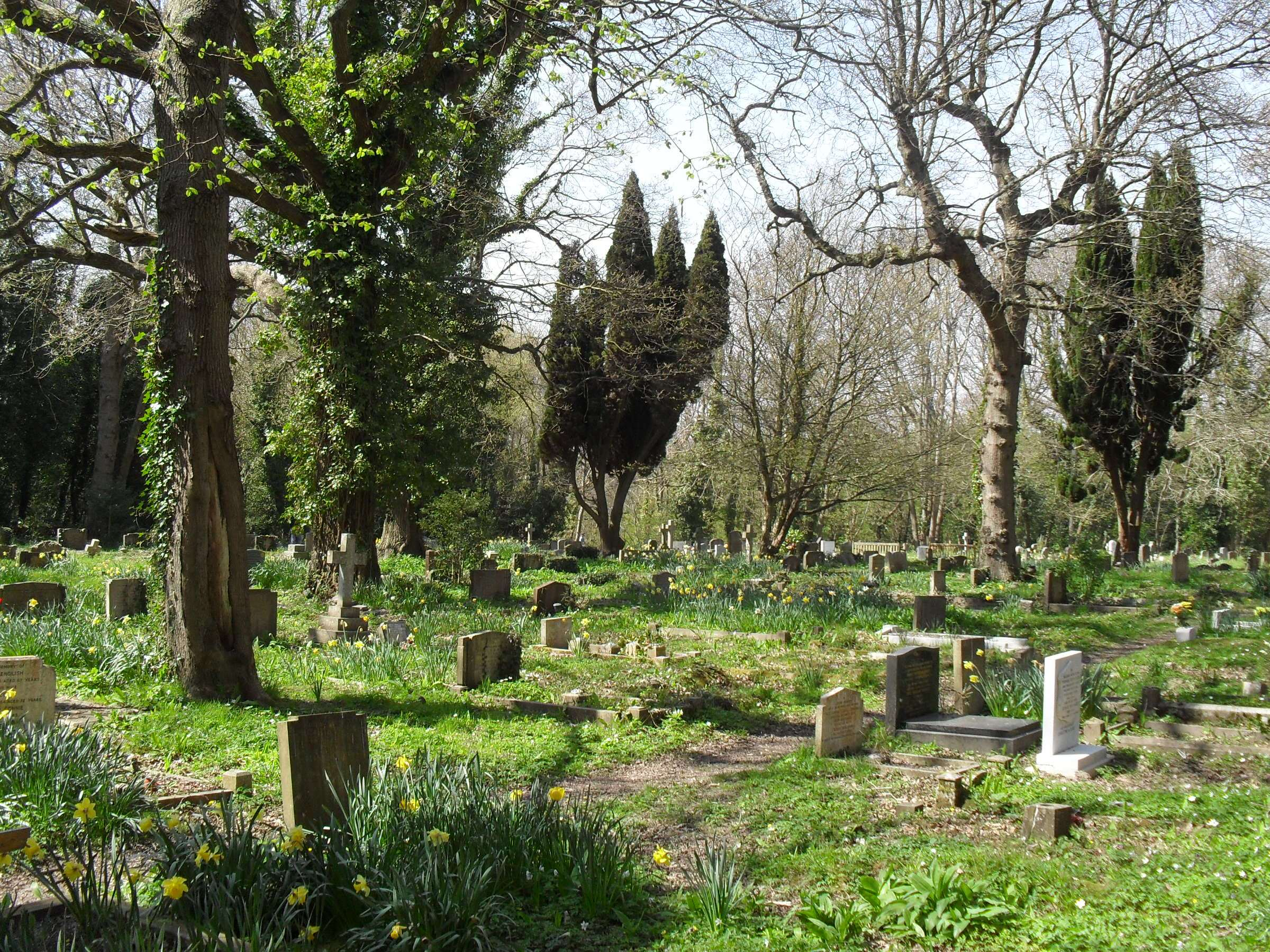
- Interactive map of Church Wood and Robsack Wood
- Type: Local Nature Reserve
- Location: Hastings, East Sussex
- OS grid: TQ 784 111
- Area: 29.7 hectares (73 acres)
- Manager: Hastings Borough Council

Church Wood and Robsack Wood is a 29.7-hectare (73-acre) Local Nature Reserve in Hastings in East Sussex. It is owned and managed by Hastings Borough Council.

This site in four separate areas has semi-natural woodland, semi-improved grassland and streams. Woodland flora include toothwort, goldilocks buttercup and early purple orchid.
