= Combe Haven =

Protected area in East Sussex, England

Coordinates: 50.863°N 0.512°E

- Site of Special Scientific Interest
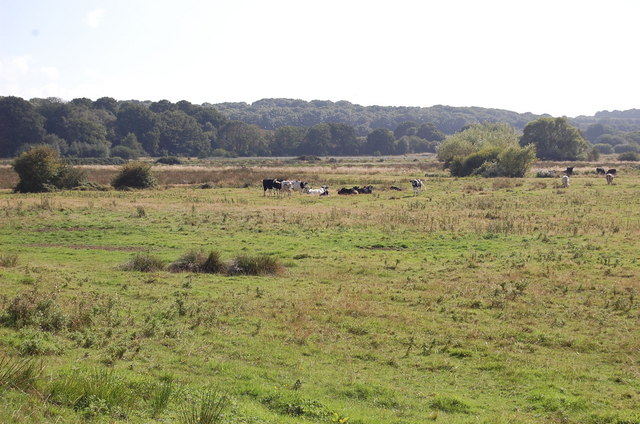
- Location of Combe Haven.
- Area of search: East Sussex
- Grid reference: TQ 769 101
- Interest: Biological
- Area: 153.0 acres (61.9 hectares)
- Notification date: 1985
- Location map: Magic Map

Combe Haven is a 153-hectare (380-acre) biological Site of Special Scientific Interest between Hastings and Bexhill-on-Sea in East Sussex. An area of 18.5 acres (7.5 hectares) is Filsham Reedbed Local Nature Reserve, which is managed by the Sussex Wildlife Trust

This site has diverse habitats. Most of it is poorly drained alluvial meadows which are divided by drainage ditches. There is also ancient woodland and Filsham Reedbed is the largest area of reed beds in East Sussex. There are diverse breeding and wintering birds and many species of butterflies.
