= Graffham Common =

Nature reserve in Sussex, England

Coordinates: 50.968°N 0.674°W

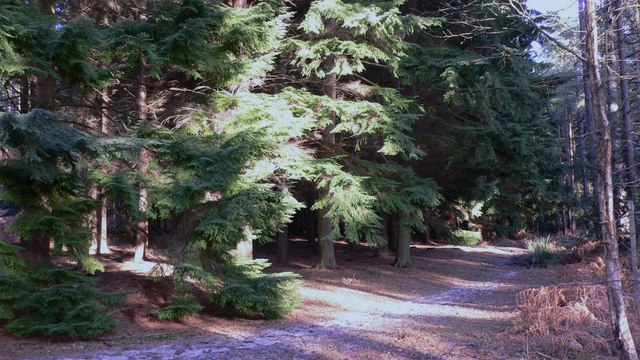
- Interactive map of Graffham Common
- Type: Nature reserve
- Location: Between Midhurst and Petworth, West Sussex
- OS grid: SU932196
- Area: 38 hectares (94 acres)
- Manager: Sussex Wildlife Trust

Graffham Common is a 38-hectare (94-acre) nature reserve between Midhurst and Petworth in West Sussex. It is owned and managed by the Sussex Wildlife Trust.

This former pine plantation is being restored back to heath and grassland by the clearance of pine trees and rhododendrons. Drainage ditches have been blocked to allow the natural restoration of wet heath. Wet seepages provide a habitat for cross-leaved heath, hare’s-tail cottongrass and purple moor-grass.
