= Burton Park SSSI =

Park and biological site of interest

Coordinates: 50.950°N 0.611°W

- Site of Special Scientific Interest
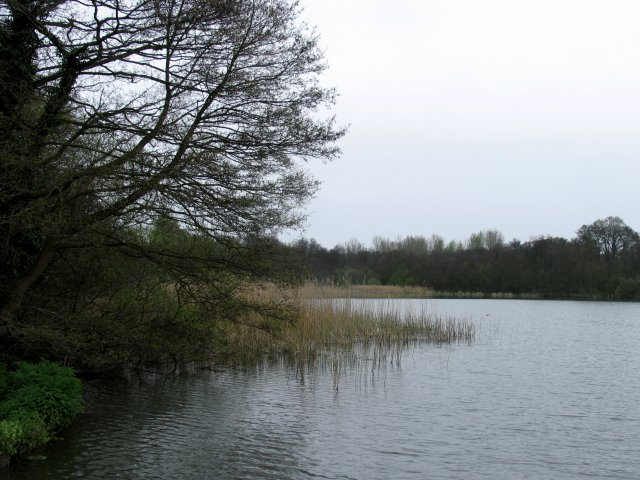
- Location of Burton Park SSSI.
- Area of search: West Sussex
- Grid reference: SU 977 176
- Interest: Biological
- Area: 57.7 hectares (143 acres)
- Notification date: 1986
- Location map: Magic Map

Burton Park SSSI is a 57.7-hectare (143-acre) biological Site of Special Scientific Interest west of Pulborough in West Sussex. A larger area of 63 hectares (160 acres), including Chingford Pond to the west, is designated a Local Nature Reserve called Burton and Chingford Ponds, which is managed by the Sussex Wildlife Trust and West Sussex County Council. The site is adjacent to Burton Park, a Grade I listed building.

This site comprises a large pond, carr woodland, bog, wet heath and marshy grassland. There is a diverse range of invertebrates including three nationally rare species, the snail Omphiscola glabra and the craneflies Erioptera meijerei and Tipula marginata. The site is also important for its breeding water birds, such as water rails and great crested grebes.
