= Gillham Wood =

Nature reserve in East Sussex, England

Coordinates: 50.836°N 0.437°E

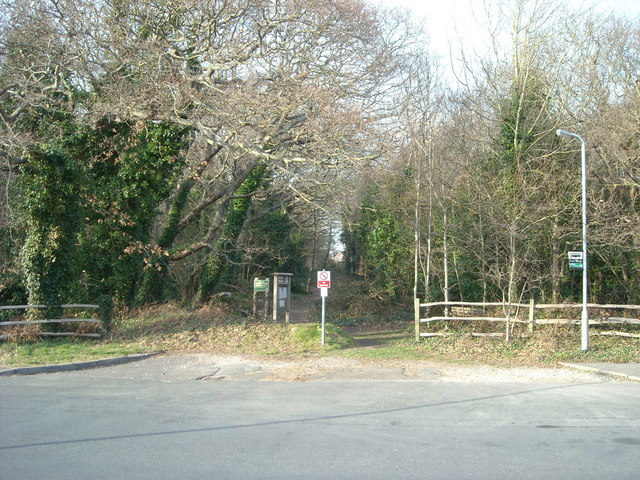
- Interactive map of Gillham Wood
- Type: Nature reserve
- Location: Bexhill-on-Sea, East Sussex
- OS grid: TQ717069
- Area: 3 hectares (7.4 acres)
- Manager: Sussex Wildlife Trust

Gillham Wood is a 3-hectare (7.4-acre) nature reserve west of Bexhill-on-Sea in East Sussex. It is managed by the Sussex Wildlife Trust.

The wood is mainly oak with an understorey of hazel, birch and holly. An old bomb crater is now a pond which provides water for a variety of wildlife. Part of the site is closed to the public so as to provide a sanctuary for foxes and other wildlife. Fungi include parasitic bolete, and seventy-four species of birds have been recorded on the site.
