= Levin Down =

Protected area in Singleton, West Sussex, England

Coordinates: 50.915°N 0.741°W

- Site of Special Scientific Interest
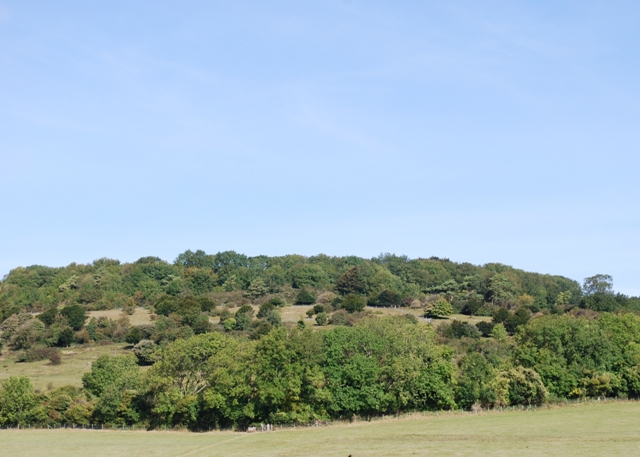
- Location of Levin Down.
- Area of search: West Sussex
- Grid reference: SU 886 136
- Interest: Biological
- Area: 25.6 hectares (63 acres)
- Notification date: 1987
- Location map: Magic Map

Levin Down is a 25.6-hectare (63-acre) biological Site of Special Scientific Interest south of Midhurst in West Sussex. It is managed by the Sussex Wildlife Trust.

This is an area of chalk grassland and heath on the slope of the South Downs. The chalk turf has a rich variety of flora, such as autumn gentian, salad burnet, round-headed rampion, autumn lady’s tresses, eyebright, glaucous sedge and quaking grass.

There is access by a footpath from Charlton.
