= Sussex Wildlife Trust =

Conservation charity which aims to protect natural life

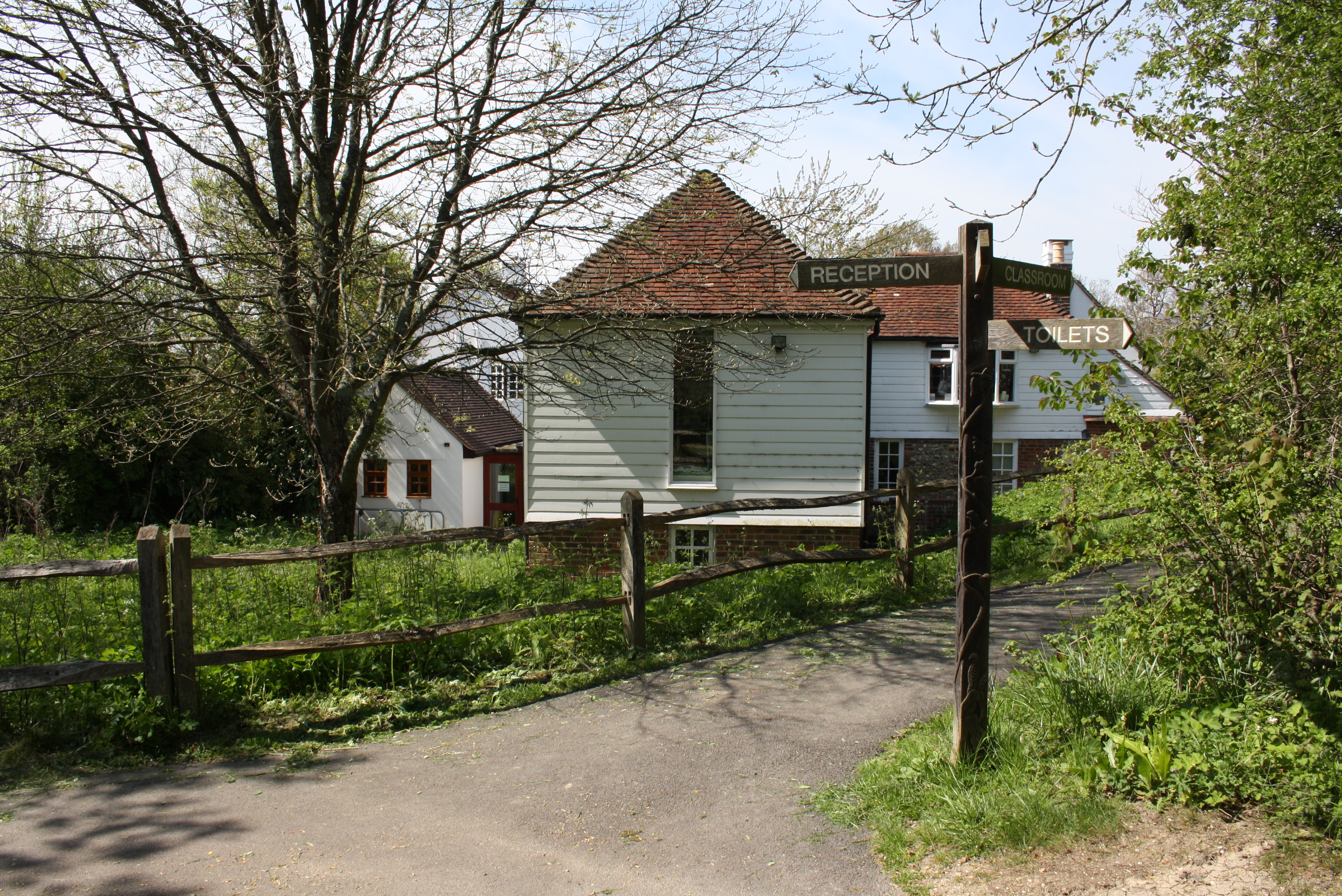
- Woods Mill headquarters of the SWT in 2009
- Formation: 1961
- Headquarters: Woods Mill
- Location: Sussex
- Members: 38,000
- Website: Sussex Wildlife Trust

The Sussex Wildlife Trust (SWT) is a conservation charity which aims to protect natural life in Sussex. It was founded in 1961 and is one of 46 wildlife trusts across the UK and the Isle of Man and Alderney. As of 2024, it had 38,000 members and manages 2,000 hectares (5,000 acres) of land for nature. It is a registered charity and in the year to 31 March 2019 it had an income of £5.7 million and expenditure of £4 million, resulting in net income of £1.7 million.

The SWT manages twenty-six nature reserves in the county. (Note: This is the number of reserves which are listed separately on the SWT website. No details are given of other small reserves.) Nineteen are Sites of Special Scientific Interest, one is a national nature reserve, eleven are local nature reserves, eight are Special Areas of Conservation, three are Special Protection Areas, three are Ramsar sites and seven are Nature Conservation Review sites. Its headquarters at Woods Mill, south of Henfield, is also a nature reserve with a lake, woodland and meadows.

The historic county of Sussex is divided into the administrative counties of East Sussex and West Sussex. The South Downs stretches across the county from west to east. This area is chalk and to the north is the Weald, which is composed of heavy clays and sand. The coast has a succession of holiday towns such as Brighton, Eastbourne, Bognor Regis and Worthing.

== Key ==
=== Public access ===
- FP = public access to footpaths through the site
- NO = No public access to the site
- PP = public access to part of the site
- YES = public access to the whole or most of the site

=== Designations ===
- LNR = Local nature reserve
- NCR = Nature Conservation Review
- NNR = National nature reserve
- Ramsar = Ramsar site, an internationally important wetland site
- SAC = Special Area of Conservation
- SPA = Special Protection Area under the European Union Directive on the Conservation of Wild Birds
- SSSI = Site of Special Scientific Interest

== Sites ==
Site	Photograph	Area (Note: The area and location are taken from the Wildlife Trust page for each site.)	Location	Public access	Designations	Description
Amberley Wildbrooks	Amberley Wildbrooks	80 hectares (200 acres)	Amberley; 50.913°N 0.536°W; TQ030136	FP	NCR Ramsar SAC SPA SSSI	This site has wet grassland, peat bog and man-made ditches. It has more than half the aquatic plants found in Britain and diverse invertebrates, some of which are internationally rare. The site is also important for waders, which breed there, and for wintering wildfowl.
Brickfield Meadow	Brickfield Meadow	1.4 hectares (3.5 acres)	Uckfield; 51.019°N 0.097°E; TQ472265	YES		This wildflower rich meadow has been traditionally managed for many years by cutting in the summer and grazing later in the year. Flowering plants include Dyer’s greenweed, devil's-bit scabious, bitter-vetch and zigzag clover. It is one of the best places in the county for the chimney sweeper moth.
Burton and Chingford Ponds	Burton Mill Pond	56 hectares (140 acres)	Petworth; 50.953°N 0.609°W; SU978180	YES	LNR SSSI	This site has ponds, carr woodland, bog, wet heath and marshy grassland. There is a diverse range of invertebrates including three nationally rare species, the snail Omphiscola glabra and the craneflies Erioptera meijerei and Tipula marginata. The site is also important for its breeding water birds, such as water rails and great crested grebes.
Cooksbridge Meadow	Cooksbridge Meadow	9 hectares (22 acres)	Fernhurst; 51.035°N 0.725°W; SU895270	YES		Most of this site is grassland but there is also a narrow strip of woodland and a stream. The meadows are grazed by sheep in order to keep the grass down and ensure a good display of flowers in the spring. Woodland flowers include sanicle, yellow archangel and purslane.
Ditchling Beacon	Ditchling Beacon	24 hectares (59 acres)	Hassocks; 50.900°N 0.107°W; TQ332129	YES	SSSI	This is one of the highest points of the South Downs and it has a 360-degree view across the Weald and the Sussex coast. It is herb-rich chalk grassland which provides food for a variety of insects, including butterflies such as the chalkhill blue and the uncommon silver-spotted skipper.
Ebernoe Common	Ebernoe Common	157 hectares (390 acres)	Petworth; 51.041°N 0.611°W; SU975278	YES	NCR NNR SAC SSSI	This site consists of several blocks of ancient woodland. It is nationally important for lichens, with over 100 species, and for fungi, with seven Red Data Book species. It is also nationally important for woodland breeding birds and for bats, especially barbastelles and Bechstein’s.
Eridge Rocks	Eridge Rocks	44 hectares (110 acres)	Tunbridge Wells; 51.098°N 0.218°E; TQ554355	YES	SSSI	This is ancient woodland on clay with outcrops of sandstone which form cliffs up to ten metres high. Flora on the rocks include Tunbridge filmy fern, the mosses Dicranum scottianum and Orthodontium gracile and the liverworts Scapania umbrosa, Scapania gracilis and Harpanthus scutatus.
Filsham Reedbed	[Filsham Reedbed	19 hectares (47 acres)	Hastings; 50.851°N 0.520°E; TQ775088	YES	LNR SSSI	This is one of the largest reedbeds in the county and it also has areas of grazing marsh, swamp and ancient woodland. There is a wide variety of plants and over 1000 species of invertebrates have been recorded. The bird life is important and diverse, with species such as Cetti's warbler, reed bunting, sedge warbler, purple heron, red-backed shrike and water rail.
Flatropers Wood	Flatropers Wood	38 hectares (94 acres)	Rye; 50.980°N 0.651°E; TQ862234	YES		The wood is mainly oak and birch, but there are also areas of sweet chestnut and former plantations of Scots pine and beech. The site is notable for its invertebrates, with almost 500 species of moths recorded and the rare oak mining-bee.
Gillham Wood	Gillham Woods	3 hectares (7.4 acres)	Bexhill-on-Sea; 50.836°N 0.437°E; TQ717069	PP		The wood is mainly oak with an understorey of hazel, birch and holly. An old bomb crater is now a pond which provides a habitat for a variety of fauna and flora. Part of the site is closed to the public so as to provide a sanctuary for foxes and other wildlife.
Graffham Common	Graffham Common	38 hectares (94 acres)	Petworth; 50.968°N 0.674°W; SU932196	YES		This former pine plantation is being restored back to heath and grassland by the clearance of pine trees and rhododendrons. Drainage ditches have been blocked to allow the natural restoration of wet heath. Wet seepages provide a habitat for cross-leaved heath, hare’s-tail cottongrass and purple moor-grass.
Iping and Stedham Commons	Iping Common	125 hectares (310 acres)	Midhurst; 50.991°N 0.787°W; SU852220	YES	LNR NCR SSSI	This is described by Natural England as one of the richest areas of heath in the county. Most of it is dry but there are also areas of wet heath, two ponds, woodland, scrub and grassland. It has a rich invertebrate fauna, and breeding heathland birds include nightjars and stonechats.
Levin Down	Levin Down	28 hectares (69 acres)	Chichester; 50.910°N 0.740°W; SU887130	YES	SSSI	This is an area of chalk grassland and heath on the slope of the South Downs. The chalk turf has a rich variety of flora, such as autumn gentian, salad burnet, round-headed rampion, autumn lady’s tresses, eyebright, glaucous sedge and quaking grass.
Malling Down	Malling Down	85 hectares (210 acres)	Lewes; 50.883°N 0.022°E; TQ423112	YES	NCR SAC SSSI	This South Downs site is chalk grassland, which is one of Britain's richest habitats for flowers. There are many orchids including the widespread common spotted and fragrant and rarer ones such as the musk and frog orchid.
Marline Valley	Marline Valley	43 hectares (110 acres)	Hastings; 50.882°N 0.535°E; TQ784122	YES	LNR SSSI	This site has ancient woodland and species rich unimproved grassland. The wood has coppice of hornbeam, hazel and sweet chestnut and standards of pedunculate oak. (Note: Coppicing with standards was a form of forestry management widely used until the late nineteenth century. Most of the trees were regularly coppiced, that is cut down to near ground level, resulting in a stool which provides a base for new growth. Scattered trees were standards which were not coppiced but left to grow.) A stream runs along a steep sided valley which has 61 species of mosses and liverworts, including some uncommon species.
The Mens	The Mens	166 hectares (410 acres)	Petworth; 51.003°N 0.543°W; TQ023236	YES	NCR SAC SSSI	This large area of woodland has diverse breeding birds and rich lichen and fungal floras. There are many rare beetles and a fly which is under threat of extinction, Chelostoma curvinervis. All three British species of woodpecker breed on the site, together with other woodland species such as nightingales, woodcocks and wood warblers.
Old Lodge	Old Lodge	74 hectares (180 acres)	Uckfield; 51.056°N 0.095°E; TQ469306	YES	LNR NCR SAC SPA SSSI	This highland site is mainly grassland and heather, with areas of gorse and scattered birch and oak trees. There are also small Scots pine plantations. Birds include common redstart and common crossbills and there are large nests of red wood ants.
Pevensey Marshes	Pevensey Marshes	150 hectares (370 acres)	Pevensey; 50.835°N 0.353°E; TQ658066	NO	NCR Ramsar SAC SSSI	This wetland site has a network of pools, scrapes and ditches. There are many plants which are only found in high quality water, such as flowering-rush, water-violet, tubular water-dropwort. Ditches have nationally important populations of some rare aquatic molluscs such as Segmentina nitida and Anisus vorticulus.
Rye Harbour	Rye Harbour	465 hectares (1,150 acres)	Rye; 50.937°N 0.763°E; TQ942189	YES	LNR Ramsar SAC SPA SSSI	This large reserve has diverse coastal habitats, including saltmarsh, shingle, reedbeds, saline lagoons, grazing marsh and flooded gravel pits. More than 280 species of birds have been recorded, out of which 90 breed on the site. There are more than 450 flowering plant species, including 27 which are scarce and two of which are endangered, least lettuce and stinking hawksbeard.
Seaford Head	Seaford Head	83 hectares (210 acres)	Seaford; 50.762°N 0.131°E; TV504980	YES	LNR NCR SSSI	The site has diverse habitats with chalk grassland, chalk cliffs, scrub, vegetated shingle, wet grassland, saltmarsh and rockpools. Grassland flora include kidney vetch, squinancywort, moon carrot and clustered bellflower. There are butterflies such as silver-spotted skipper, chalkhill blue and adonis blue.
Selwyns Wood	Selwyns Wood	11 hectares (27 acres)	Heathfield; 50.963°N 0.207°E; TQ551205	YES		This reserve has woodland with extensive sweet chestnut, a stream in a narrow valley and an area of heather. Breeding woodland birds include willow warblers, chiffchaffs, nuthatches and marsh tits.
Southerham Farm	Southerham Farm	131 hectares (320 acres)	Lewes; 50.861°N 0.067°E; TQ456089	YES		The thin and infertile soils on this chalk site result in a floristically very rich grassland. Plants which flower in the summer include horseshoe vetch, kidney vetch, mouse-ear hawkweed, field scabious, dropwort and salad burnet.
Waltham Brooks	Waltham Brooks	42 hectares (100 acres)	Pulborough; 50.953°N 0.542°W; TQ025181	FP	SSSI	This is one of the few remaining areas of grazing marsh in the county and it has a rich variety of aquatic flora, including one nationally rare species, the small water-pepper. Many bird species winter at the site, including three in nationally important numbers, Bewick’s swan, teal and shoveler.
West Dean Woods	West Dean Woods	17 hectares (42 acres)	Chichester; 50.932°N 0.799°W; SU845154	NO	SSSI	These woods have records dating back to the sixteenth century. The ground layer is rich in flowering plants, including white helleborine, fly orchid and around two million wild daffodils. Thirty five species of bryophyte have been recorded and invertebrates include two rare hoverflies which live on dead wood, Cheilosa carbonaria and Cheilosa nigripes.
Withdean Woods	Withdean Woods	1 hectare (2.5 acres)	Brighton; 50.853°N 0.164°W; TQ293075	PP	LNR	Many of the mature trees on this site were destroyed by the Great Storm of 1987, but it still has a range of mammals including foxes, badgers and common pipistrelle bats, while there are birds such as great spotted woodpecker and firecrests.
Woods Mill	Woods Mill	19 hectares (47 acres)	Henfield; 50.910°N 0.269°W; TQ218137	YES		This is the headquarters of the trust and an environmental education centre. The main feature of the nature reserve is a lake, which has many damselflies and dragonflies, such as the scarce chaser and downy emerald. There is also a large area of ancient woodland, with oak, silver birch and coppiced hazel.

== See also ==
- List of Local Nature Reserves in East Sussex
- List of Local Nature Reserves in West Sussex
- List of Sites of Special Scientific Interest in East Sussex
- List of Sites of Special Scientific Interest in West Sussex

== Sources ==
- Ratcliffe, Derek, ed. (1977). A Nature Conservation Review. Vol. 2. Cambridge, UK: Cambridge University Press. ISBN 978-0-521-21403-2.
