= West Dean Woods =

Protected area in West Sussex, England

Coordinates: 50.933°N 0.797°W

- Site of Special Scientific Interest
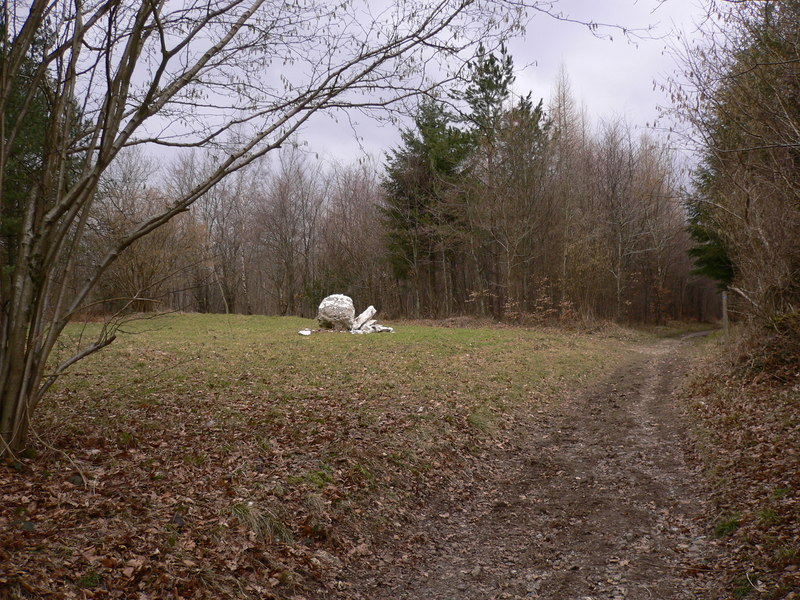
- Location of West Dean Woods.
- Area of search: West Sussex
- Grid reference: SU 846 155
- Interest: Biological
- Area: 16.3 hectares (40 acres)
- Notification date: 1985
- Location map: Magic Map

West Dean Woods is a 16.3-hectare (40-acre) biological Site of Special Scientific Interest north of West Dean in West Sussex. It is managed by the Sussex Wildlife Trust.

These woods have records dating back to the sixteenth century. The ground layer is rich in flowering plants, including white helleborine, fly orchid and around two million wild daffodils. Thirty five bryophytes have been recorded and invertebrates include two rare hoverflies which live on dead wood, Cheilosa carbonaria and Cheilosa nigripes.

There is no public access to the site.
