= Cooksbridge Meadow =

Nature reserve in Sussex, England

Coordinates: 51.035°N 0.725°W

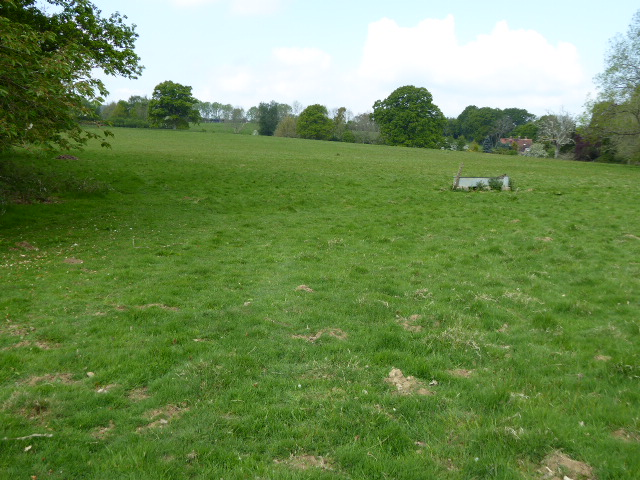
- Interactive map of Cooksbridge Meadow
- Type: Nature reserve
- Location: Fernhurst, West Sussex
- OS grid: SU895270
- Area: 9 hectares (22 acres)
- Manager: Sussex Wildlife Trust

Cooksbridge Meadow is a 9-hectare (22-acre) nature reserve south of Fernhurst in Sussex. It is managed by the Sussex Wildlife Trust.

Most of this site is grassland but there is also a narrow strip of woodland and a stream. The meadows are grazed by sheep in order to keep the grass down and ensure a good display of flowers in the spring. Woodland flowers include sanicle, yellow archangel and purslane.

There is access by a footpath opposite the Kings Arms public house on the A286 road.
