= Southerham Farm =

Nature reserve in East Sussex, England

Coordinates: 50.865°N 0.026°E

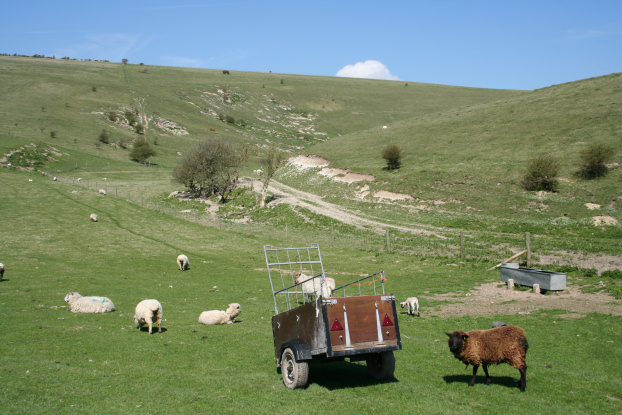
- Interactive map of Southerham Farm
- Type: Nature reserve
- Location: Lewes, East Sussex
- OS grid: TQ427093
- Area: 131 hectares (320 acres)
- Manager: Sussex Wildlife Trust

Southerham Farm is a 131-hectare (320-acre) nature reserve on the eastern outskirts of Lewes in East Sussex. It is managed by the Sussex Wildlife Trust.

The thin and infertile soils on this chalk site result in a floristically very rich grassland. Plants which flower in the summer include horseshoe vetch, kidney vetch, mouse-ear hawkweed, field scabious, dropwort and salad burnet.
