= Marline Valley Woods =

Woodland in East Sussex, England

Coordinates: 50.881°N 0.528°E

- Site of Special Scientific Interest
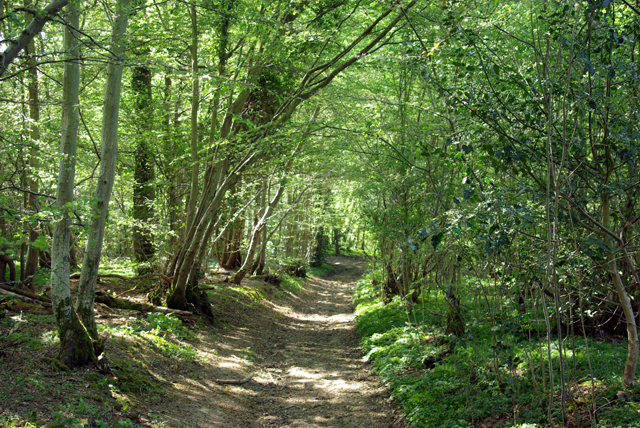
- Location of Marline Valley Woods.
- Area of search: East Sussex
- Grid reference: TQ 779 121
- Interest: Biological
- Area: 55.1 hectares (136 acres)
- Notification date: 1986
- Location map: Magic Map

Marline Valley Woods is a 55.1-hectare (136-acre) biological Site of Special Scientific Interest on the western outskirts of Hastings in East Sussex. An area of 40.3 hectares (100 acres) is a Local Nature Reserve owned by Hastings Borough Council and managed by the Sussex Wildlife Trust.

This site has ancient woodland and species rich unimproved grassland. The wood has standards of pedunculate oak and coppice of hornbeam, hazel and sweet chestnut. A stream runs along a steep sided valley which has 61 species of mosses and liverworts, including some uncommon species.

There is access from Queensway.
