= Castle Hill, Newhaven =

Park in East Sussex, England

Coordinates: 50.782°N 0.048°E

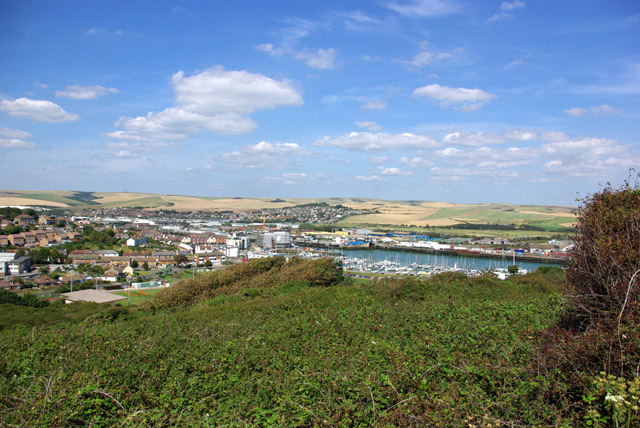
- Interactive map of Castle Hill, Newhaven
- Type: Local Nature Reserve
- Location: Newhaven, East Sussex
- OS grid: TQ 445 001
- Area: 16.4 hectares (41 acres)

Castle Hill, Newhaven is a 16.4-hectare (41-acre) Local Nature Reserve in Newhaven in East Sussex. It is owned and managed by Lewes District Council. It is part of Brighton to Newhaven Cliffs Site of Special Scientific Interest and Geological Conservation Review site.

The hill has views to the sea to the south, the Downs to the north and Newhaven to the east. Habitats are geologically important cliffs, scrub and grassy glades. There are several badger setts and other fauna include sea birds, slow worms and common lizards.

There is access from Fort Road.
