= Summerfields Wood =

Woodland in Hastings, East Sussex, England

Coordinates: 50.859°N 0.569°E

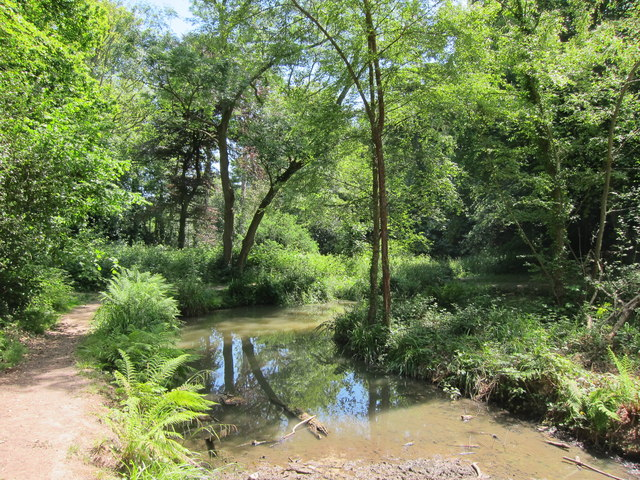
- Interactive map of Summerfields Wood
- Type: Local Nature Reserve
- Location: Hastings, East Sussex
- OS grid: TQ 809 097
- Area: 6.3 hectares (16 acres)
- Manager: Hastings Borough Council

Summerfields Wood is a 6.3-hectare (16-acre) Local Nature Reserve in Hastings in East Sussex. It is owned and managed by Hastings Borough Council.

There are many paths through this semi-natural wood, which has a number of ponds. Birds include firecrest, whinchat, ring ouzel, wood warbler, spotted flycatcher and pied flycatcher.
