= Filsham Reedbed =

British nature reserve

Coordinates: 50.860°N 0.524°E

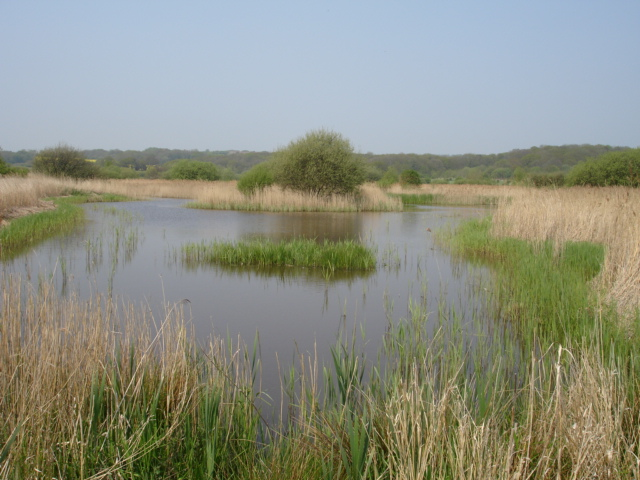
- Interactive map of Filsham Reedbed
- Type: Local Nature Reserve
- Location: St Leonards-on-Sea, East Sussex
- OS grid: TQ 777 097
- Area: 18.5 hectares (46 acres)
- Manager: Sussex Wildlife Trust

Filsham Reedbed is an 18.5-hectare (46-acre) Local Nature Reserve on the western outskirts of St Leonards-on-Sea in East Sussex. It is owned by Hastings Borough Council and managed by Sussex Wildlife Trust. It is part of Combe Haven Site of Special Scientific Interest.

This is one of the largest reedbeds in the county and it also has areas of grazing marsh, swamp and ancient woodland. There is a wide variety of plants and over 1000 species of invertebrates have been recorded. The bird life is also important and diverse.

There is access from Reedswood Road and from a footpath alongside Combe Haven river.
