= Old Roar Gill and Coronation Wood =

Nature reserve in East Sussex, England

Coordinates: 50.875°N 0.563°E

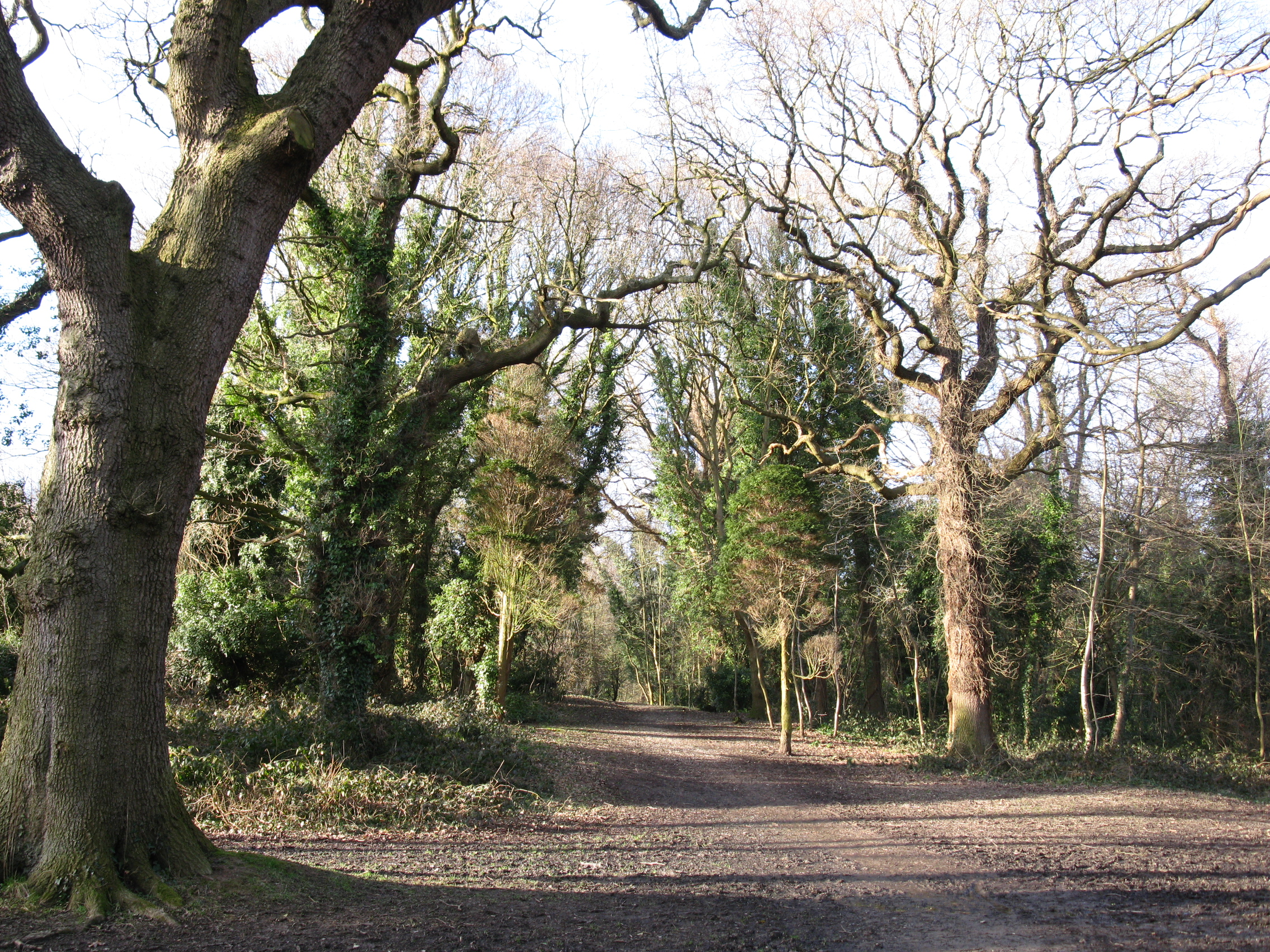
- Interactive map of Old Roar Gill and Coronation Wood
- Type: Local Nature Reserve
- Location: Hastings, East Sussex
- OS grid: TQ 804 115
- Area: 7.6 hectares (19 acres)
- Manager: Hastings Borough Council

Old Roar Gill and Coronation Wood is a 7.6-hectare (19-acre) Local Nature Reserve in Hastings in East Sussex. It is owned and managed by Hastings Borough Council.

This site has areas of open water, broadleaved woodland, fern and tall herbs. Old Roar Gill is a narrow steep-sided valley at the northern end of Alexandra Park. It has uncommon liverworts, mosses and lichens, together with rare and scarce invertebrates such as Rolph's door snail and the crane fly Lipsothrix nervosa.
