= West Park, Uckfield =

Nature reserve

Coordinates: 50.973°N 0.081°E

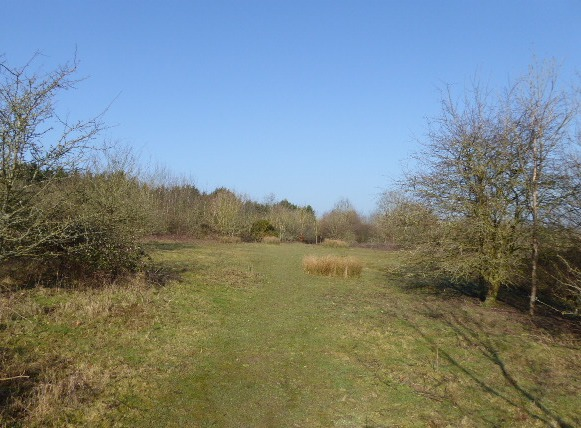
- Interactive map of West Park, Uckfield
- Type: Local Nature Reserve
- Location: Uckfield, East Sussex
- OS grid: TQ 462 214
- Area: 10.5 hectares (26 acres)
- Manager: Uckfield Town Council

West Park is a 10.5-hectare (26-acre) Local Nature Reserve on the western outskirts of Uckfield in East Sussex. It is owned and managed by Uckfield Town Council.

This site has grassland, woodland and a marshy area which provides a habitat for several orchid species, including the southern marsh orchid. There is also a population of dormice.

Access points include Princes Close.
