= Old Lodge =

Nature reserve in East Sussex, England

Coordinates: 51.055°N 0.085°E

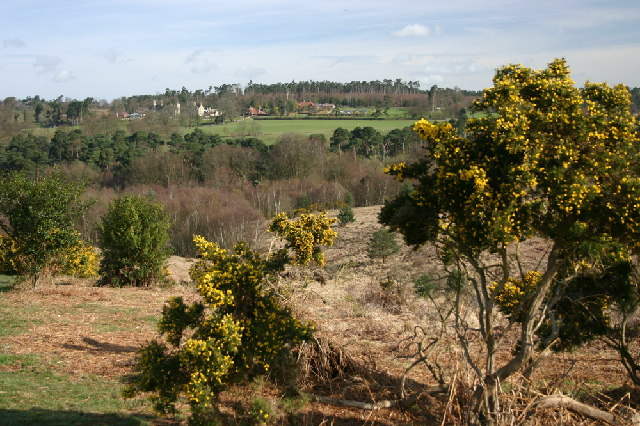
- Interactive map of Old Lodge
- Type: Local Nature Reserve
- Location: Crowborough, East Sussex
- OS grid: TQ 462 305
- Area: 103.1 hectares (255 acres)
- Manager: Sussex Wildlife Trust

Old Lodge is a 103.1-hectare (255-acre) Local Nature Reserve west of Crowborough in East Sussex. It is privately owned. It is managed by Sussex Wildlife Trust. It is part of Ashdown Forest, which is a Nature Conservation Review site, Grade I, a Special Area of Conservation, a Special Protection Area and a Site of Special Scientific Interest.

This highland site is mainly grassland and heather, with areas of gorse and scattered birch, oak, and Scots pine trees. Birds include common redstart and common crossbills and there are large nests of red wood ants.
