= Withdean and Westdene Woods =

Nature reserve in East Sussex, England

Coordinates: 50.854°N 0.160°W

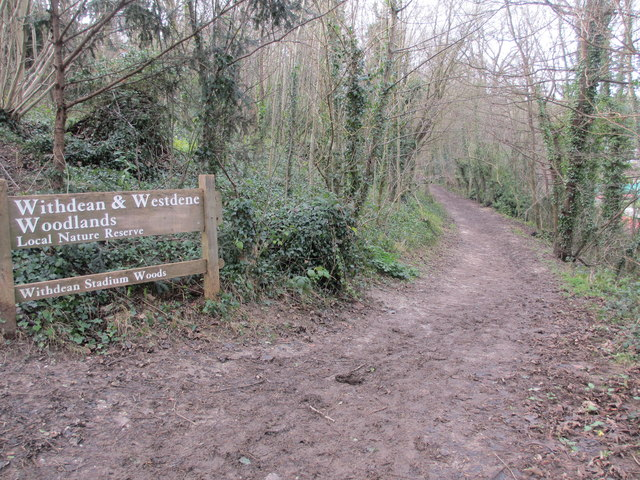
- Interactive map of Withdean and Westdene Woods
- Type: Local Nature Reserve
- Location: Brighton, East Sussex
- OS grid: TQ 296 077
- Area: 7.9 hectares (20 acres)
- Manager: Brighton and Hove City Council and Sussex Wildlife Trust

Withdean and Westdene Woods is a 7.9-hectare (20-acre) Local Nature Reserve in four separate areas in Brighton in East Sussex. Most of the site is owned and managed by Brighton and Hove City Council. Withdean Woods is a 1-hectare (2.5-acre) nature reserve managed by the Sussex Wildlife Trust.

Many of the mature trees on this site were destroyed by the Great Storm of 1987, but it still has a range of mammals including foxes, badgers and common pipistrelle bats, while there are birds such as great spotted woodpecker and firecrests.
