= Hempstead Meadow =

Nature reserve in East Sussex, UK

Coordinates: 50.969°N 0.099°E

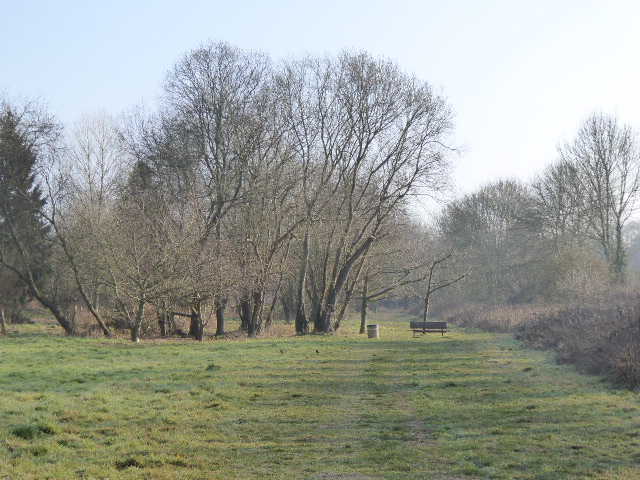
- Interactive map of Hempstead Meadow
- Type: Local Nature Reserve
- Location: Uckfield, East Sussex
- OS grid: TQ 475 210
- Area: 1.6 hectares (4.0 acres)
- Manager: Uckfield Town Council

Hempstead Meadow is a 1.6-hectare (4.0-acre) Local Nature Reserve in Uckfield in East Sussex. It is owned and managed by Uckfield Town Council.

The site is mainly wet grassland with scattered trees and scrub. Flora include primroses, tussock sedge and various ferns. The meadow is used as a foraging area by bats.

There is access from Waitrose carpark off the High Street.
