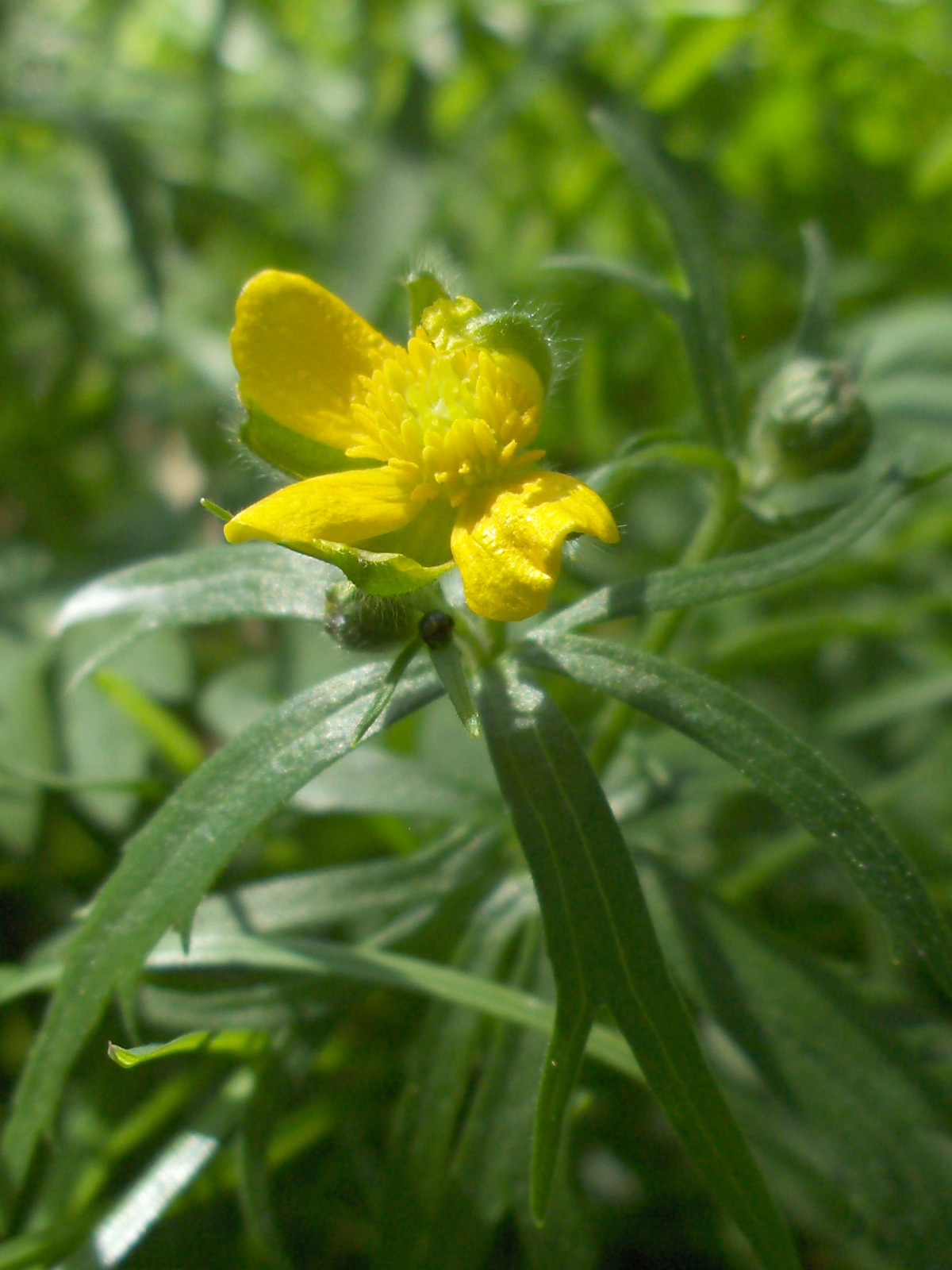

Scientific classification
- Kingdom: Plantae
- Clade: Embryophytes
- Clade: Tracheophytes
- Clade: Angiosperms
- Clade: Eudicots
- Order: Ranunculales
- Family: Ranunculaceae
- Genus: Ranunculus
- Species: R. auricomus

Binomial name
- Ranunculus auricomus L.

= Ranunculus auricomus =

Species of flowering plant

Goldilocks buttercup (Ranunculus auricomus agg.), sometimes also called Greenland buttercup, is a diverse group of species from the buttercup family (Ranunculaceae) native to Eurasia. It is an important model group in evolutionary biology, which is of great significance for research into the origins of apomixis, polyploidy, and speciation. Species are perennial and typically found in moist woods, at the margins of woods and waysides, and swamp meadows.

== Description ==
Ranunculus auricomus is a short and slightly hairy perennial herb with bright yellow flowers. It can reach a height between 30–100 centimetres (39 in), and have as many as 10 non-dissected to palmately-lobed basal leaves. Its upper stem leaves are deeply divided into 3-5 narrow segments giving the plant a filiform appearance. The leaf shape is varying though the season (polyphylly) and only the most dissected basal leaf is taxonomically informative, making it difficult to identify Ranunculus auricomus taxa by only one individual of a given population.

== Distribution ==
Ranunculus auricomus is native to many parts of temperate to arctic Europe and Asia, and also occurs in parts of Greenland and Alaska. In Britain it is generally a lowland species but has been recorded at 1,090 metres (3,580 ft) on Aonach Beag. It is common in England and southern Scotland but becomes increasingly uncommon in the north and west, so much so that, for example, it is named in the description of the Nature Reserve of Coed Garnllwyd in the Vale of Glamorgan.

== Habitat and ecology ==
Ranunculus auricomus is a perennial herb which is characteristic of deciduous woodland growing over base rich soils such as those underlain by chalk or limestone. In addition it has been recorded growing among scrub, along roadsides and in churchyards, and infrequently on open moorland in locations which are sheltered by boulders and on sheltered mountain ledges. Flowering starts in March or April and peaks at the end of May and start of June. Yellow buttercup flowers attract pollinating insects like Diptera and Coleoptera.

The hermaphroditic flower is radially symmetrical and five-petaled with a double perianth. Not all five yellow petals are always fully developed. The diploid sexual progenitor species usually have a full number of petals, while the polyploid apomictic hybrid taxa (also listed as “nothotaxa”) often have a reduced number. The number of petals also depends on surrounding environmental factors. Pollination occurs through cross-pollination (insect pollination) in self-incompatible species, and often through self-pollination in self-compatible apomictic species, in which the seeds develop from unfertilized ova.

It has been hypothesized that since asexual reproduction in plants is associated with a lack of genetic recombinational variation in populations, this reduces the efficiency of selection against deleterious mutations. This deficiency is considered to lead to the accumulation of mutations, a gradual increase in mutational load (Muller’s ratchet), and thus the rapid extinction of such asexual lineages. However apomictic, asexual R. auricomus appears to have overcome this limitation by having a little bit of sex.

== Taxonomy ==
The species complex comprises more than 800 described taxa. A recent study based on phylogenomic and geometric-morphometric methods has grouped the 12 existing diploid, partly tetraploid taxa into 5 progenitor species based on the latest species concepts and methods of integrative taxonomic research. One of the progenitor species, Ranunculus cassubicifolius, also occurs in southern Germany and Austria along the northern edge of the Alps, as well as in the Carpathians. The other stem species are distributed in the Pyrenees and the Massif Central (Ranunculus envalirensis), in Austria and Slovenia (Ranunculus notabilis), in the Apennines (Ranunculus marsicus), and in the Carpathians (Ranunculus flabellifolius). Further recent studies based on the 75 most widespread European apomictic taxa have shown that apomictics have largely arisen through hybridization, backcrossing to the parent species, and polyploidization, and are often polyphyletic and morphologically indistinguishable. They have therefore been classified as nothotaxa (hybrid taxa).

The classic classification into Ranunculus auricomus, Ranunculus cassubicus, and Ranunculus fallax cannot be maintained. More than 100 notothaxa are reported for Central Europe and more than 50 nothotaxa for Great Britain.
