= Rye Harbour LNR =

Nature reserve in East Sussex, England

Coordinates: 50.932°N 0.743°E

Rye Harbour
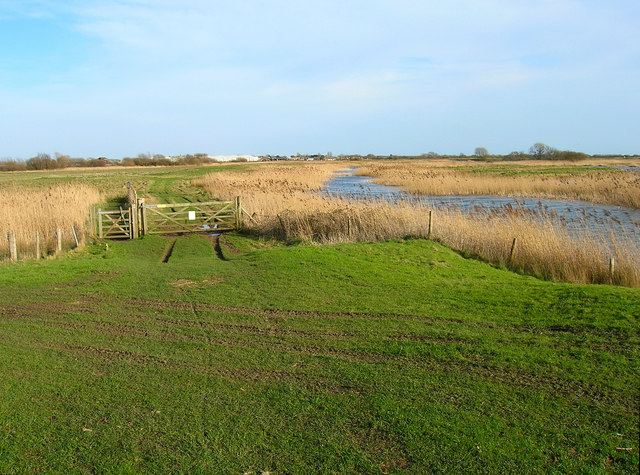
- Interactive map of Rye Harbour
- Type: Local nature reserve
- Location: Rye, East Sussex
- OS grid: TQ 928 183
- Area: 325.4 hectares (804 acres)
- Manager: Sussex Wildlife Trust

Rye Harbour LNR is a 325.4-hectare (804-acre) local nature reserve in Rye in East Sussex. The site is part of the 465-hectare (1,150-acre) nature reserve managed by the Sussex Wildlife Trust. It is also part of Dungeness, Romney Marsh and Rye Bay Ramsar site, Special Protection Area and Site of Special Scientific Interest and Dungeness Special Area of Conservation.

This large reserve has diverse coastal habitats, including saltmarsh, shingle, reedbeds, saline lagoons, grazing marsh and flooded gravel pits. More than 280 species of birds have been recorded, out of which 90 breed on the site. There are more than 450 flowering plant species, including 27 which are scarce and two which are endangered, least lettuce and stinking hawksbeard.
