= Persicaria minor =

Scientific classification
- Kingdom: Plantae
- Clade: Tracheophytes
- Clade: Angiosperms
- Clade: Eudicots
- Order: Caryophyllales
- Family: Polygonaceae
- Genus: Persicaria
- Species: P. minor

Binomial name
- Persicaria minor (Huds.) Opiz

Synonyms
- Polygonum minus Huds.

Species of plant

Persicaria minor is species of herb in the family Polygonaceae. Common names include pygmy smartweed, small water pepper and swamp willow weed. This herb is native to Asia, but distributed widely in Europe and Australia. It is used in South East Asian cooking.

== Description ==
Persicaria minor is native to South East Asia, including Malaysia, Thailand, Vietnam and Indonesia. It grows wild in cooler highlands, but is also found in wet lowland areas near rivers, ditches, and canals. It is a creeping plant with slender stems, and grows upright to a height of 1 to 1.5 meters. The creeping stem is green with a reddish tinge, is cylindrical in shape, and has short nodes about 9 mm apart. Its leaves are long and narrowly tapering, alternately arranged, and green with short, reddish petioles. Its flowers are minute, pale violet, and are 12 to 15 mm long.

== Uses ==
Persicaria minor is an edible, aromatic herb. In Malaysia and Indonesia it has the common name "kesum", and its shoots and young leaves are eaten raw as part of salad (ulam); Used as an aroma spice additive in peppery dishes such as laksa, nasi kerabu, asam pedas and tom yam; used as tea leaves; and used for topical applications in traditional medicine. Its oil has been used for aromatherapy and in treatments for dandruff. In Malaysian traditional medicine, P. minor has been used in post-natal tonics and for treatment of digestion.

Pharmacological studies on P. minor have indicated anti-oxidant, LDL oxidation, anti-inflammatory and anti-microbial activities, digestive enhancing and anti-ulcer activities, cognitive enhancing activities, immuno-modulating activities, acetylcholinesterase-inhibiting activity and as a microbial inhibitor to prevent food spoilage. Comparative studies have been carried out to analyse the metabolites not only in the plant's leaves, but also in its stem and roots. Clinical studies have been carried out on this plant, looking at reported abilities to improve cognition, mood and stress, and memory.

Compared with other four Malaysian herbs (Cosmos caudatus, Piper sarmentosum, Centella asiatica, Syzygium polyanthum), the Persicaria minor showed the highest concentration of phenols and the highest antioxidant activity. It has been used as a bioactive component for packaging film for edible foods, based on a semi-refined carrageenan and glycerol as plasticizers.

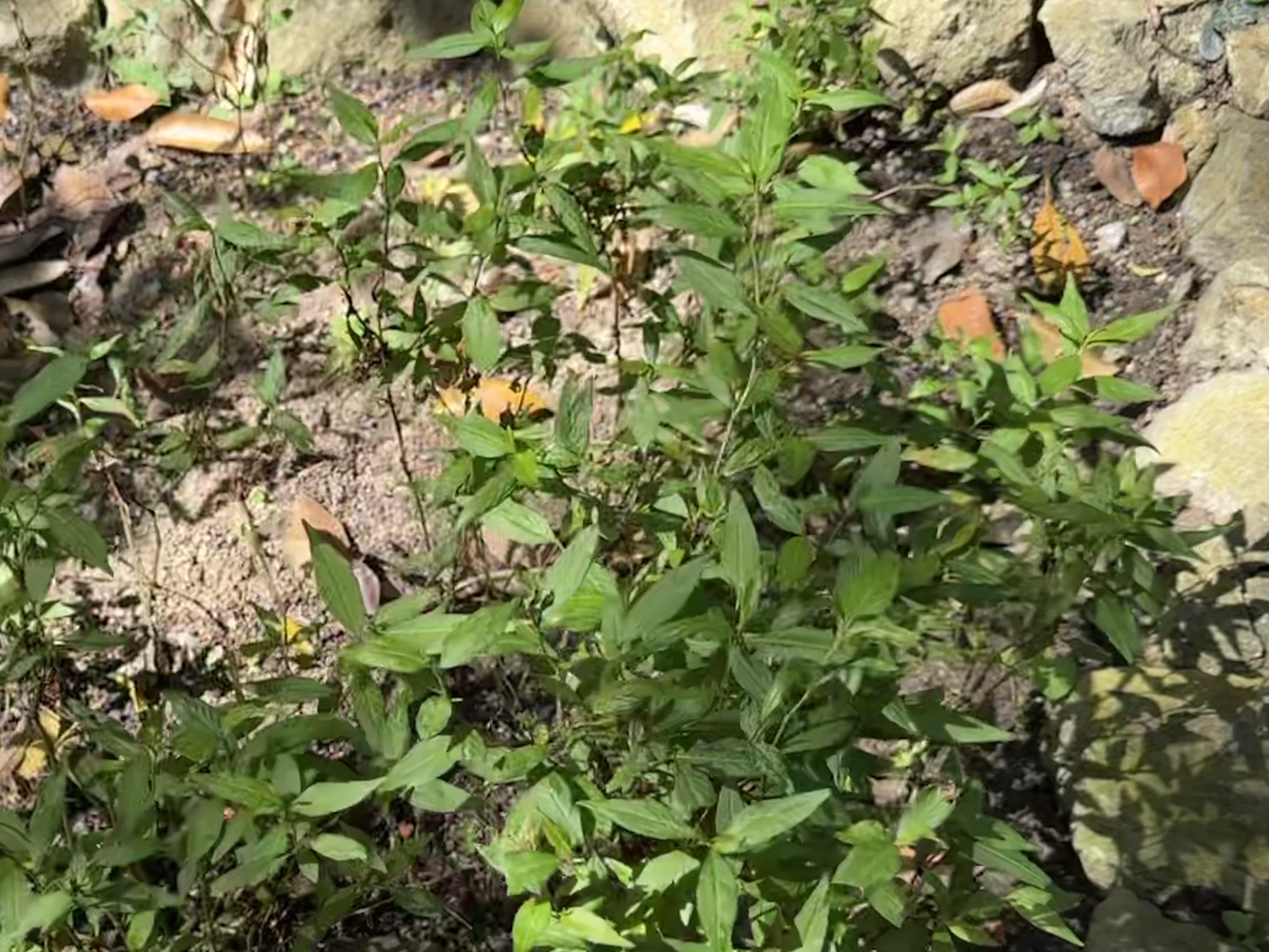
Persicaria minor (Synonym Polygonum minus) The leaves are cooked as a vegetable or used in peppery hot soups such as tomyam. Photo taken in The Tropical Spice Garden on Penang island in Malaysia.

== Composition ==
P. minor has high content of dietary fiber, thiamine, carbohydrate, protein and minerals. It is also rich in calcium, potassium, vitamin A and vitamin C, which reportedly gives it a high level of antioxidant properties. Other constituents include quercetin, quercetin-3-glucuronide, myricetin, apigetrin, hyperoside and astragalin.
