= List of Sites of Special Scientific Interest in West Sussex =

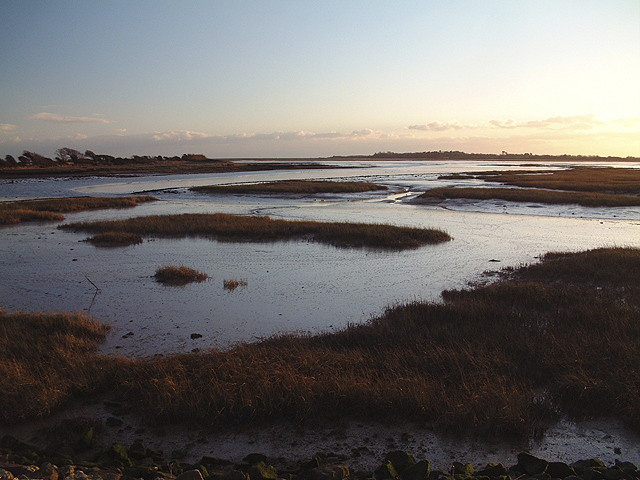
Pagham Harbour

West Sussex is in south-east England and it has a population of approximately 780,000. The county town is Chichester. In the north of the county are the heavy clays and sands of the Weald. The chalk of the South Downs runs across the centre from east to west and in the south a coastal plain runs down to the English Channel.

In England, Sites of Special Scientific Interest (SSSIs) are designated by Natural England, which is responsible for protecting England's natural environment. The most important wildlife and geological sites are designated as SSSIs in order to give them legal protection.

As of July 2019 there are 77 SSSIs in West Sussex, of which 53 are biological, 18 are geological and 6 are both biological and geological. Twenty-four are Geological Conservation Review sites, fifteen are Nature Conservation Review sites, ten are Special Areas of Conservation, six are Special Protection Areas, five are internationally important Ramsar wetland sites, two are national nature reserves, seven are local nature reserves, parts of six are scheduled monuments, ten are managed by the Sussex Wildlife Trust and one, which is partly in Surrey, is managed by the Surrey Wildlife Trust.

== Key ==
=== Interest ===
- B = site of biological interest
- G = site of geological interest

=== Public access ===
- FP = access to footpaths through the site only
- No = no public access to site
- PP = public access to part of site
- Yes = public access to all or most of the site

=== Other classifications ===
- GCR = Geological Conservation Review site
- LNR = Local nature reserve
- NCR = Nature Conservation Review site
- NNR = National nature reserve
- Ramsar = Ramsar site, an internationally important wetland site
- SAC = Special Area of Conservation
- SM = Scheduled monument
- SPA = Special Protection Area under the European Union Directive on the Conservation of Wild Birds
- SWT = Sussex Wildlife Trust
- SYWT = Surrey Wildlife Trust

== Sites ==
Site name	Photograph	B	G	Area (Note: The area and grid reference are taken from the "Details" page for each site on the Natural England database.)	Public access	Location	Other classifications	Map (Note: The maps are provided by Natural England on the Magic Map website.)	Citation (Note: Citations are provided for each site by Natural England.)	Description
Adur Estuary	Adur Estuary	✓		60.3 hectares (149 acres)	PP	Shoreham-by-Sea; 50.836°N 0.286°W; TQ 208 055		Map	Citation	The estuary has large areas of saltmarsh. Sea purslane is dominant above the mean high water mark and glasswort below. There are also intertidal mudflats which are nationally important for ringed plovers. Other birds include redshanks and dunlin.
Amberley Mount to Sullington Hill	Amberley Mount to Sullington Hill	✓		177.2 hectares (438 acres)	PP	Pulborough; 50.901°N 0.497°W; TQ 058 124		Map	Citation	This site has chalk grassland and scrub on the slope of the South Downs. It has several unusual butterflies, moths and snails, including the rare adonis blue butterfly and the light feathered rustic and juniper carpet moths.
Amberley Wild Brooks	Amberley Wild Brooks	✓		327.5 hectares (809 acres)	PP	Pulborough; 50.918°N 0.532°W; TQ 033 142	NCR Ramsar SAC SPA SWT	Map	Citation	This area of grazing marsh, which is dissected by drainage ditches, has a number of uncommon invertebrates, particularly dragonflies, and 156 species of flowering plants have been recorded. It is also important for wintering birds, with nationally significant numbers of teal, shoveler and Bewick’s swan. There are two rare snails, Anisus vorticulus and Pseudamnicola confusa.
Ambersham Common	Ambersham Common	✓		141.6 hectares (350 acres)	YES	Midhurst; 50.967°N 0.707°W; SU 909 194	NCR	Map	Citation	This site is mainly heathland with a wide range of invertebrates, including the nationally rare Ectemnius borealis, a digger wasp which has only been found at three British sites. There are also areas of bog and acid carr. It has a wide variety of bird species, including some which are rare, such as European nightjars, woodlarks and Dartford warblers.
Arun Banks	Arun Banks	✓		25.8 hectares (64 acres)	PP	Arundel; 50.881°N 0.542°W; TQ 027 101		Map	Citation	This site consists of a tidal stretch of the River Arun and a cut-off meander loop. The diverse flora includes reed sweet grass, sea club-rush and glaucous bulrush. The river banks have wet grassland, scrub, woodland and drainage ditches with tall fen.
Arundel Park	Arundel Park	✓		134.0 hectares (331 acres)	YES	Arundel; 50.873°N 0.565°W; TQ 011 091		Map	Citation	This old deer park on the chalk of the South Downs has an ancient artificial body of water, Swanbourne Lake. The site is described by Natural England as one of the most important sites in the country for invertebrates. There are fifteen endangered species, including the field cricket Gryllus campestris and the beetle Laemophloeus monilis. Another rarity is the mollusc Pseudamnicola confusa. There is also a diverse breeding bird community.
Beeding Hill to Newtimber Hill	Beeding Hill to Newtimber Hill	✓	✓	321.0 hectares (793 acres)	PP	Henfield; 50.887°N 0.224°W; TQ 250 112	GCR NCR	Map	Citation	Most of this site on the slope of the South Downs is unimproved chalk grassland, which has a diverse flora with around 40 flowering plants per square metre. Invertebrates include a nationally important assemblage of harvestmen. Devil's Dyke is geologically important as an example of Pleistocene erosion of a dry chalk valley.
Bognor Common Quarry	Bognor Common Quarry		✓	25.1 hectares (62 acres)	YES	Pulborough; 50.983°N 0.564°W; TQ 009 214	GCR	Map	Citation	This site exposes the Hythe Beds, part of the Lower Greensand Group, which dates to the Early Cretaceous between 145 and 100 million years ago. Fuller's earth has been found on the site, which may derive from a volcanic source to the south.
Bognor Reef	Bognor Reef	✓	✓	39.7 hectares (98 acres)	YES	Bognor Regis; 50.775°N 0.706°W; SZ 913 981	GCR	Map	Citation	This is an area of beach, sand dunes, grassland, scrub and marsh. Flora include the nationally endangered childing pink. It is one of the few areas which has the full sequence of layers in the London Clay, dating to the Early Eocene around fifty million years ago. It is particularly valuable for plant fossils. It is described by Natural England as the most important site in the world for pyritised fossil insects, especially beetles.
Bracklesham Bay	Bracklesham Bay	✓	✓	200.6 hectares (496 acres)	YES	Chichester; 50.753°N 0.847°W; SZ 814 954	GCR	Map	Citation	This stretch of foreshore has unimproved grazing pastures, shingle, salt marsh, reed beds and ditches. The pasture is subject to seasonal flooding and it is important for its breeding and overwintering birds. The site has highly fossiliferous Eocene (56 to 34 million years ago) beds with fossils of over 160 fish species. There are also much more recent Middle Pleistocene marine deposits dating to around 500,000 years ago which provide a record of changes in sea levels.
Buchan Hill Ponds	Buchan Hill Ponds	✓		19.5 hectares (48 acres)	YES	Crawley; 51.094°N 0.226°W; TQ 243 342		Map	Citation	This site consists of two ponds and adjacent wet woodland. The ponds, which were formed by damming streams, have seventeen species of dragonfly, two of which are nationally uncommon, the hairy dragonfly and downy emerald. The woods have a rich ground flora, including marsh violet, opposite leaved golden saxifrage and wood avens.
Burton Park	Burton Park	✓		57.7 hectares (143 acres)	YES	Petworth; 50.950°N 0.611°W; SU 977 176	LNR SWT	Map	Citation	This site comprises a large pond, carr woodland, bog, wet heath and marshy grassland. There is a diverse range of invertebrates including three nationally rare species, the snail Omphiscola glabra and the craneflies Erioptera meijerei and Tipula marginata. The site is also important for its breeding water birds, such as water rails and great crested grebes.
Chanctonbury Hill	Chanctonbury Hill	✓		82.7 hectares (204 acres)	PP	Steyning; 50.895°N 0.380°W; TQ 140 119	SM	Map	Citation	This site on the steep slope of the South Downs is mainly woodland with some areas of chalk grassland. A dewpond has great crested newts, a species protected under the Wildlife and Countryside Act 1981. More than sixty species of breeding birds have been recorded, including meadow pipits, corn buntings and green woodpeckers.
Chantry Mill	Chantry Mill		✓	8.7 hectares (21 acres)	FP	Pulborough; 50.913°N 0.445°W; TQ 094 138	GCR	Map	Citation	This site provides the best exposure of the junction between the Gault and Folkestone Beds of the Wealden Group, dating to around 140 million years ago in the Early Cretaceous.
Chapel Common	Chapel Common	✓		101.0 hectares (250 acres)	YES	Liphook; 51.050°N 0.833°W; SU 819 285	SM	Map	Citation	Most of the common is dry heath but there are also areas of woodland, grassland and scrub. Heathland birds include three internationally important species listed on Annex I of the EU Birds Directive: woodlark, European nightjar, and Dartford warbler. The site also has nationally rare and scarce invertebrates.
Chichester Harbour	Chichester Harbour	✓	✓	3,733.5 hectares (9,226 acres)	PP	Chichester; 50.809°N 0.916°W; SU 765 016	GCR LNR NCR Ramsar SAC SPA	Map (Note: This site is partly in Hampshire.)	Citation	The harbour has diverse habitats, including intertidal mudflats, shingle, saltmarsh, sand dunes, marshes and woodland. The mudflats provide feeding grounds for internationally important numbers of ringed plovers, grey plovers, redshanks, black-tailed godwits, dunlins, sanderlings, curlews and greenshanks. There are geologically important sand dunes and shingles at East Head and east of Langstone.
Chiddingfold Forest	Chiddingfold Forest	✓		542.5 hectares (1,341 acres)	PP	Billingshurst; 51.089°N 0.581°W; SU 995 332	SYWT	Map (Note: This site is partly in Surrey.)	Citation	The site consists of a number of separate areas with a mosaic of habitats, such as ancient woodland and conifer plantations. Over 500 species of butterflies and moths have been recorded, including several which are rare and endangered, such as the large tortoiseshell butterfly and the rest harrow and orange upperwing moths. Other insects include the Cheilosia carbonaria hoverfly.
Cissbury Ring	Cissbury Ring	✓		84.2 hectares (208 acres)	YES	Worthing; 50.858°N 0.375°W; TQ 145 078	SM	Map	Citation	This is the site of a Neolithic flint mine and a large hillfort dating to the Iron Age. It has unimproved chalk grassland, scrub and neutral grassland. Upright brome is dominant in the chalk grassland, while common grasses in the neutral grassland include Yorkshire fog, sheep's fescue and creeping bent. The scrub areas provide important habitats for birds and butterflies.
Clayton to Offham Escarpment	Clayton to Offham Escarpment	✓		422.5 hectares (1,044 acres)	PP	Lewes; 50.897°N 0.075°W; TQ 355 126	SWT	Map (Note: This site is partly in East Sussex.)	Citation	Much of this site is steeply sloping chalk grassland, which has many flowering plants such as glaucous sedge, autumn gentian, marjoram, squinancywort and several species of orchid. There are also areas of woodland and scrub and the site has a rich community of breeding birds.
Climping Beach	Climping Beach	✓		32.1 hectares (79 acres)	YES	Bognor Regis; 50.780°N 0.553°W; TQ 021 010	LNR	Map	Citation	This stretch of shoreline has sand dunes at the back of a vegetated shingle beach, which is a nationally uncommon habitat. The intertidal zone has soft muds and sands with many invertebrates, which are an important source of food for wintering birds, especially sanderling.
Coates Castle	Coates Castle	✓		7.7 hectares (19 acres)	NO	Pulborough; 50.964°N 0.591°W; SU 991 172		Map	Citation	This site consists of three separate areas near Coates Castle. They contain the entire known population (approximately 200) in Britain of Gryllus campestris, a field cricket which is protected under the Schedule 5 of the Wildlife and Countryside Act 1981.
Coneyhurst Cutting	Coneyhurst Cutting		✓	0.2 hectares (0.49 acres)	YES	Billingshurst; 51.009°N 0.433°W; TQ 100 244	GCR	Map	Citation	This road cutting exposes a 0.43-metre (0.47-yard) thick layer of limestone dating to the Lower Weald Clay of the Early Cretaceous around 130 million years ago. The layer contains the fossils of large Viviparus (freshwater river snails) preserved in three dimensions.
Coppedhall Hanger	Coppedhall Hanger		✓	0.6 hectares (1.5 acres)	YES	Billingshurst; 51.038°N 0.464°W; TQ 078 276	GCR	Map	Citation	A stream runs through this site and it exposes a layer of sand, silt and jet from the Lower Weald Clay around 130 million years ago. The sand contains fragments of detritus dating to the 280 million year old Cornubian batholith.
Cow Wood and Harry's Wood	Cow Wood and Harry's Wood	✓		75.5 hectares (187 acres)	YES	Haywards Heath; 51.054°N 0.189°W; TQ 270 298		Map	Citation	This area of ancient semi-natural woodland is crossed by ghylls, streams in steep valleys which have a warm and moist microclimate. Forty-seven species of breeding birds have been recorded, including wood warbler, willow tit, hawfinch and lesser spotted woodpecker.
Duncton to Bignor Escarpment	Duncton to Bignor Escarpment	✓		229.0 hectares (566 acres)	PP	Pulborough; 50.920°N 0.620°W; SU 971 143	NCR SAC	Map	Citation	This steeply sloping site on the South Downs has mature beech woodland together with other habitats including chalk grassland and scrub. Invertebrates include the largest British population of the snail Helicodonta obvoluta and several rare moth species. A spring has a rich marginal vegetation including opposite-leaved golden saxifrage.
Eartham Pit, Boxgrove	Eartham Pit, Boxgrove		✓	9.8 hectares (24 acres)	YES	Chichester; 50.870°N 0.690°W; SU 923 086	GCR	Map	Citation	The oldest human remains in Britain have been discovered on the site, a shinbone and two teeth of Homo heidelbergensis dating to 500,000 years ago. Flint tools have also been found. The site is close to a fossil shoreline which has interglacial mammal fauna in intertidal sediments.
East Dean Park Wood	East Dean Park Wood	✓		17.8 hectares (44 acres)	NO	Chichester; 50.899°N 0.722°W; SU 900 118		Map	Citation	Dry sheltered woods on chalk downland were once common in the county, but this site is one of the few surviving examples. More than 100 species of woodland plant have been recorded, such as spurge laurel and early-purple orchid. There is a nationally important epiphytic flora, including over 80 lichens and 44 mosses and liverworts.
Ebernoe Common	Ebernoe Common	✓		233.9 hectares (578 acres)	PP	Petworth; 51.035°N 0.611°W; SU 975 271	NCR NNR SAC SWT	Map	Citation	This site consists of several blocks of ancient woodland. It is nationally important for lichens, with over 100 species, and for fungi, with seven Red Data Book species. It is also nationally important for woodland breeding birds and for bats, especially barbastelles and Bechstein’s.
Fairmile Bottom	Fairmile Bottom	✓		70.2 hectares (173 acres)	PP	Arundel; 50.877°N 0.594°W; SU 990 095	LNR	Map	Citation	This is an area of scrub, mature forest and species-rich chalk grassland. Yew is dominant over much of the woodland, but in some parts there is a high proportion of beech. According to Natural England there is an "outstanding diversity of beetles" and butterflies include the white admiral and the uncommon silver-washed fritillary.
Felpham	Felpham		✓	1.0 hectare (2.5 acres)	YES	Bognor Regis; 50.785°N 0.655°W; SZ 949 992	GCR	Map	Citation	This short stretch of shoreline is one of only three in Britain to have fossils of flora dating to the Paleocene, the first epoch after the Cretaceous–Paleogene extinction event 66 million years ago. It has yielded four previously unknown genera and sixteen new species.
Forest Mere	Forest Mere	✓		14.6 hectares (36 acres)	FP	Liphook; 51.062°N 0.833°W; SU 819 298		Map	Citation	The site consists of Folly Pond and surrounding woodland, heath and bog. Natural England describes it as notable for its outstanding assemblage of dragonflies, with 17 species recorded, and 49 breeding birds, including heath and woodland species such as European stonechat, wood warbler and tree pipit.
Freshfield Lane	Freshfield Lane		✓	17.0 hectares (42 acres)	FP	Haywards Heath; 51.021°N 0.028°W; TQ 384 265	GCR	Map	Citation	This working quarry exposes rocks dating to formations in the Wealden Group of Lower Cretaceous age, around 140 to 113 million years ago. It is described by Natural England as "internationally important for palaeoenvironmental, provenance and palaeogeographical studies".
Fyning Moor	Fyning Moor	✓		12.8 hectares (32 acres)	FP	Petersfield; 51.003°N 0.841°W; SU 814 233		Map	Citation	This is a base-rich and springline alder wood, which is a nationally uncommon woodland type. Open rides have diverse flora and there are fens on the margins of a river. There are three nationally uncommon fly species, Xylota abiens, Ctenophora bimaculata and Rhobdomastix hilaris.
Halnaker Chalk Pit	Halnaker Chalk Pit	✓		6.4 hectares (16 acres)	NO	Chichester; 50.872°N 0.692°W; SU 921 089		Map	Citation	This chalk pit is important as it has about 50% of the British population of a nationally rare and vulnerable plant, broad-leaved cudweed. Other plants include hoary plantain, scarlet pimpernel, bent grass, yellow-wort and autumn gentian.
Harting Downs	Harting Downs	✓		336.3 hectares (831 acres)	YES	Chichester; 50.955°N 0.862°W; SU 800 179	NCR LNR	Map	Citation	This site consists of several chalk grassland valleys on the steep slope of the South Downs, together with areas of scrub and long-established woodland. The site is important for insects, with a nationally rare snail, Helicondonta obvoluta, two uncommon moths, the wood tiger and the maple prominent, and many rove beetles.
Heyshott Down	Heyshott Down	✓		42.6 hectares (105 acres)	YES	Midhurst; 50.944°N 0.725°W; SU 897 168	NCR	Map	Citation	This site on the South Downs is unimproved chalk grassland, which is a nationally rare habitat. The grassland is plant-rich and it is nationally important for mosses and liverworts, such as Antitrichia curtipendula, Hylocomium brevirostre and Rhytidiadelphus loreus. The site is also nationally important for spiders and harvestmen and it is one of only two sites in Britain where the spider Tapinocyboides pygmaea has been recorded.
Horton Clay Pit	Horton Clay Pit		✓	0.4 hectares (0.99 acres)	NO	Henfield; 50.899°N 0.278°W; TQ 212 125	GCR	Map	Citation	This site displays a thick and stratigraphically important sequence of rocks dating to the Folkestone Beds of the Early Cretaceous. It shows evidence of a major structural basin which controlled sedimentation in the western Weald.
House Copse	House Copse	✓		12.5 hectares (31 acres)	NO	Horsham; 51.107°N 0.249°W; TQ 227 357		Map	Citation	This ancient wood was formerly managed as hornbeam and small-leaved lime coppice with oak standards. There is limited ground flora in densely shaded areas, but the banks of a stream have more diverse flora, including dog’s mercury, wood avens, bugle and enchanter’s nightshade.
Hurston Warren	Hurston Warren	✓		69.1 hectares (171 acres)	PP	Pulborough; 50.943°N 0.477°W; TQ 071 170		Map	Citation	This site has a variety of habitats, including wet and dry heath, bogs, woodland and open water. One of the bogs is a quaking bog, where a floating raft of vegetation covers open water or fluid peat; it has flora such as round-leaved sundew, bog asphodel, hare's-tail cottongrass and cranberry. A golf course occupies much of the heath.
Iping Common	Iping Common	✓		125.4 hectares (310 acres)	YES	Midhurst; 50.990°N 0.792°W; SU 849 219	LNR NCR SWT	Map	Citation	This is described by Natural England as one of the richest areas of heath in the county. Most of it is dry but there are also areas of wet heath, two ponds, woodland, scrub and grassland. It has a rich invertebrate fauna and breeding heathland birds include European nightjar and European stonechat.
Kingley Vale	Kingley Vale	✓		204.4 hectares (505 acres)	PP	Chichester; 50.894°N 0.833°W; SU 822 112	NCR NNR SAC SM	Map	Citation	This reserve's yew woods are described by Natural England as the best in Britain as it has the most extensive stands unmixed with other species. One grove is thought to be over 500 years old, but most trees are less than 200 years old. There are also areas of chalk grassland which are rich in flowering plants and 37 breeding species of butterfly have been recorded.
Lavington Common	Lavington Common	✓		31.2 hectares (77 acres)	YES	Petworth; 50.961°N 0.650°W; SU 949 188		Map	Citation	This site has wet and dry heath, acid grassland and woodland. It has a rich community of invertebrates, especially spiders. Common trees in the woods are silver birch, downy birch and oak, while the shrub layer is dominated by bracken and bramble.
Levin Down	Levin Down	✓		25.6 hectares (63 acres)	YES	Chichester; 50.915°N 0.741°W; SU 886 136	SWT	Map	Citation	This is an area of chalk grassland and heath on the slope of the South Downs. The chalk turf has a rich variety of flora, such as autumn gentian, salad burnet, round-headed rampion, autumn lady’s tresses, eyebright, glaucous sedge and quaking grass.
Marehill Quarry	Marehill Quarry		✓	1.1 hectares (2.7 acres)	NO	Pulborough; 50.957°N 0.486°W; TQ 064 186	GCR SWT	Map	Citation	This disused quarry is the type locality for the Marehill Clay, a member of the Sandgate Beds, part of the Lower Greensand Group, which dates to the Lower Cretaceous between 145 and 100 million years ago. It has caves which are used for hibernation by several species of bats, including Natterer's, whiskered and Daubenton's.
The Mens	The Mens	✓		205.2 hectares (507 acres)	PP	Billingshurst; 51.003°N 0.542°W; TQ 024 236	NCR SAC SWT	Map	Citation	This large area of woodland has diverse breeding birds and rich lichen and fungal floras. There are many rare beetles and an endangered fly, Chelostoma curvinervis. All three British species of woodpecker breed on the site, together with other woodland species such as nightingales, woodcocks and wood warblers.
Mills Rocks	Mills Rocks	✓		1.9 hectares (4.7 acres)	FP	East Grinstead; 51.115°N 0.118°E; TQ 414 370		Map	Citation	This site has rock outcrops with a number of rare plants, such as reed fescue grass at one of its only two locations in southern England. The rocks also support a rich variety of mosses and liverworts. There are also areas of woodland, bracken and bramble.
Northpark Copse to Snapelands Copse	Northpark Copse to Snapelands Copse	✓		101.4 hectares (251 acres)	PP	Haslemere; 51.019°N 0.711°W; SU 905 252		Map	Citation	This site is important mainly because of its mosses and liverworts, which are relics of a period 5000 years ago when the British climate was milder and wetter. There are old stools of Chestnut coppice which have six species of the moss genus Dicranum and liverworts include Bazzania trilobata, Marsupella emarginata and Kurzia sylvatica.
Pads Wood	Pads Wood	✓		22.2 hectares (55 acres)	NO	Chichester; 50.941°N 0.881°W; SU 787 163		Map	Citation	This ancient coppiced wood is mainly hazel and sweet chestnut, with pedunculate oak and ash standards. The site has a rich lichen flora, most of which are epiphytic on the oak and ash standards, and a wide woodland path has a rich display of flowering plants.
Pagham Harbour	Pagham Harbour	✓	✓	629.0 hectares (1,554 acres)	PP	Bognor Regis; 50.764°N 0.765°W; SZ 872 968	GCR LNR NCR Ramsar SPA	Map	Citation	This is a large area of salt marsh, mud flats, shingle, open water, reed swamp and wet grassland. It is of national importance for breeding birds and wintering wildfowl and waders. It also has nationally important communities of plants and invertebrates, including the nationally endangered sea anemone Nematostella vectensis.
Parham Park	Parham Park	✓		263.3 hectares (651 acres)	PL	Pulborough; 50.923°N 0.493°W; TQ 060 148	NCR	Map	Citation	This medieval deer park has a very rich epiphytic lichen flora, with 165 recorded species. Habitats include woods, parkland, bogs and artificial ponds. The site also has a large heronry and two rare beetles, Ampedus cardinalis and Procraerus tibialis.
Park Farm Cutting	Park Farm Cutting		✓	0.2 hectares (0.49 acres)	YES	Pulborough; 50.960°N 0.522°W; TQ 039 189	GCR	Map	Citation	This site exposes the Sandgate Beds of the Lower Greensand Group, which dates to the Early Cretaceous between 145 and 100 million years ago. It is the best collecting ground for a diverse range of mollusc fossils.
Perry Copse Outcrop	Perry Copse Outcrop		✓	0.2 hectares (0.49 acres)	NO	Haslemere; 51.051°N 0.730°W; SU 891 287	GCR	Map	Citation	This site dates to the Early Cretaceous, between 145 and 100 million years ago. The steep banks of a stream expose a 5-metre (16-foot) high section of the Netherside Sand Member, part of the Weald Clay Group. There are 1 metre (1 yard) high fossils of Lycopodites in upright position.
Philpot's and Hook Quarries	Philpot's Quarry		✓	2.6 hectares (6.4 acres)	NO	East Grinstead; 51.070°N 0.068°W; TQ 355 319	GCR	Map	Citation	These quarries expose the Ardingly Sandstone Member in the Tunbridge Wells Sand Formation, which is part of the Wealden Group, dating to the Lower Cretaceous between 145 and 100 million years ago. Philpot's Quarry has many dinosaur fossils and both quarries have debris dating to the Precambrian.
Pulborough Brooks	Pulborough Brooks	✓		160.0 hectares (395 acres)	YES	Pulborough; 50.943°N 0.503°W; TQ 053 170	Ramsar SAC SPA	Map	Citation	These wet meadows are crossed by a network of ditches, some of which have a rich aquatic flora and invertebrate fauna, including several which are nationally rare. The site is internationally important for wintering wildfowl and many species of birds breed there, such as lapwing, common snipe, garganey, yellow wagtail, grey partridge, skylark, reed bunting and barn owl.
Rake Hanger	Rake Hanger	✓		28.2 hectares (70 acres)	FP	Liss; 51.033°N 0.868°W; SU 795 266		Map	Citation	Sessile oak is dominant on the steep slope of this site, while alder is the most common tree at the waterlogged foot of the scarp. There are lichens associated with ancient woodland, such as Thelotrema lepadinum and Haematomma elatinum. Great tussock sedge, bur-reed and great reedmace grow on the banks of two ponds.
Rook Clift	Rook Clift	✓		10.7 hectares (26 acres)	YES	Midhurst; 50.957°N 0.835°W; SU 819 182	SAC	Map	Citation	A stream rises in this steep-sided valley, which has semi-natural ancient woodland on its slopes. The canopy is dominated by a nationally scarce tree, large leaved lime, with other trees including beech and ash. The rich mollusc fauna includes Helicodonta obvoluta, which is a Red Data Book species.
Selsey, East Beach	Selsey, East Beach		✓	1.7 hectares (4.2 acres)	YES	Chichester; 50.726°N 0.783°W; SZ 860 925	GCR	Map	Citation	This site exposes a sequence of marine estuary and freshwater deposits dating to the warm Eemian interglacial. The site has fossils of fauna dating to the early Eemian around 130 thousand years ago, such as straight-tusked elephant, an extinct species of rhinoceros, Dicerorhinus hemitoechus, European pond tortoise, beaver and horse.
Shillinglee Lake	Shillinglee Lake	✓		17.0 hectares (42 acres)	FP	Billingshurst; 51.070°N 0.620°W; SU 968 310		Map	Citation	The lake has been designated an SSSI because it has four nationally uncommon plants: it is one of only ten locations in the country for Leersia oryzoides, a species of cut-grass, and the other three are water mudwort, needle spikerush and six-stamen waterwort, all of which are found on mud when the water level is low.
Singleton and Cocking Tunnels	Singleton and Cocking Tunnels	✓		1.9 hectares (4.7 acres)	NO	Chichester; 50.930°N 0.761°W; SU 872 152	SAC	Map	Citation	These disused railway tunnels are the fifth most important site for hibernating bats in Britain and the most important in south-east England. They are the only known location in the country for the greater mouse-eared bat. Other species include Natterer's, Daubenton's, Brandt's and brown long-eared bats.
Slinfold Stream and Quarry	Slinfold Stream		✓	2.3 hectares (5.7 acres)	PP	Horsham; 51.073°N 0.396°W; TQ 125 316	GCR	Map	Citation	This site exposes the Horsham Stone member of the Lower Weald Clay, dating to the Early Cretaceous, around 130 million years ago. It preserves the fossils of horsetails in their upright position, suggesting that they grew in a fresh water reedswamp with a maximum depth of 2 metres (2.2 yards).
St Leonard's Forest	St Leonard's Forest	✓		85.4 hectares (211 acres)	PP	Horsham; 51.057°N 0.272°W; TQ 212 301		Map	Citation	Much of the forest is deciduous woodland, which is dominated by pedunculate oak, silver birch, common birch and beech. The humid microclimate of a narrow valley has allowed mosses and liverworts to survive which indicate continuous woodland cover for the past 5,000 years. Butterflies include the rare purple emperor.
St Leonard's Park Ponds	St Leonard's Park Ponds	✓		3.9 hectares (9.6 acres)	YES	Horsham; 51.063°N 0.290°W; TQ 199 306		Map	Citation	These ponds and adjacent woodland provide habitats for a wide variety of dragonflies and damselflies, including some uncommon species such as the variable damselfly The banks have rich flora including the nationally rare yellow centaury. There are also several unusual mosses and liverworts.
Stone Hill Rocks	Stone Hill Rocks		✓	0.6 hectares (1.5 acres)	YES	East Grinstead; 51.095°N 0.031°W; TQ 380 347	GCR	Map	Citation	This is typical of many sandstone crags in mid-Sussex which expose the Tunbridge Wells Sand Formation, part of the Wealden Group which dates to the Early Cretaceous between 145 and 100 million years ago. It displays a variety of sedimentary structures in three dimensions and is described by Natural England as "an important site for the study and interpretation of sedimentary structures in the upper Lower Tunbridge Wells Sand".
Sullington Warren	Sullington Warren	✓		24.7 hectares (61 acres)	YES	Pulborough; 50.919°N 0.441°W; TQ 097 144	SM	Map	Citation	Most of this site is dry heath, but there are also areas of wet heath, scrub, bracken, woodland and grassland. Flora on the wet heath includes hare's-tail cottongrass and the insectivorous round-leaved sundew. Woodland birds include all three British species of woodpecker, treecreepers, long-tailed tits, nuthatches, nightingales and kestrels.
Treyford to Bepton Down	Treyford to Bepton Down	✓		121.5 hectares (300 acres)	PP	Midhurst; 50.951°N 0.800°W; SU 844 175		Map	Citation	This site consists of five separate blocks of steeply sloping chalk grassland and yew woodland on the South Downs. The grassland has a rich variety of species, including herbs such as round-headed rampion, horseshoe vetch and carline thistle, while there are orchids such as frog, bee and musk. The uncommon moss Rhacomitrium lanuginosum has also been recorded.
Turners Hill	Turners Hill		✓	0.2 hectares (0.49 acres)	NO	Crawley; 51.102°N 0.090°W; TQ 338 354	GCR	Map	Citation	This former quarry (which is now filled in) exposed the Tunbridge Wells Sand Formation, part of the Hastings Beds, which dates to the Early Cretaceous between about 145 and 100 million years ago. It provided excellent three dimensional sections through the Ardingly Sandstone Member of the Formation.
Upper Arun	Upper Arun	✓		17.6 hectares (43 acres)		Pulborough; 50.988°N 0.514°W; TQ 044 220		Map	Citation	This 13-kilometre (8-mile) long stretch of the River Arun provides the habitat for a rich riverine flora, such as common club-rush and reed canary-grass. It is an outstanding site for breeding dragonflies, including the clubtail, hairy, brilliant emerald and the nationally rare scarce chaser.
Wakehurst and Chiddingly Woods	Wakehurst and Chiddingly Woods	✓	✓	155.9 hectares (385 acres)	PP	Haywards Heath; 51.073°N 0.094°W; TQ 336 321	GCR NCR	Map	Citation	These woods have steep-sided valleys formed by streams cutting through Wadhurst Clay and Tunbridge Wells sands, exposing outcrops of sandstone. The valleys have a warm, moist micro-climate, with a rich variety of ferns, mosses, liverworts and lichens. There is also a diverse breeding bird community. Chiddingly Wood is geologically important because weathering of its sandstone has produced sculptured blocks and a comprehensive set of micro-weathering features.
Waltham Brooks	Waltham Brooks	✓		47.4 hectares (117 acres)	FP	Pulborough; 50.932°N 0.543°W; TQ 025 157	Ramsar SPA SWT	Map	Citation	This is one of the few remaining areas of grazing marsh in the county and it has a rich variety of aquatic flora, including one nationally rare species, the small water-pepper. Many bird species winter at the site, including three in nationally important numbers, Bewick’s swan, teal and shoveler.
Warnham	Warnham		✓	28.5 hectares (70 acres)	NO	Horsham; 51.104°N 0.319°W; TQ 178 352	GCR	Map	Citation	This site exposes rocks of the Weald Clay Group, dating to the Lower Cretaceous around 130 million years ago. It preserves fossil plants from freshwater and brackish-marine environments.
West Dean Woods	West Dean Woods	✓		16.3 hectares (40 acres)	NO	Chichester; 50.933°N 0.797°W; SU 846 155	SWT	Map	Citation	These woods have records dating back to the sixteenth century. The ground layer is rich in flowering plants, including white helleborine, fly orchid and around two million wild daffodils. Thirty five bryophytes have been recorded and invertebrates include two rare hoverflies which live on dead wood, Cheilosa carbonaria and Cheilosa nigripes.
West Harting Down	West Harting Down	✓		13.9 hectares (34 acres)	YES	Petersfield; 50.956°N 0.918°W; SU 761 179		Map	Citation	This is mainly mature yew forest on the chalk of the South Downs. There are also areas of chalk grassland with flora such as rock rose, carnation sedge, perforate St John’s wort and salad burnet, with grasses such as red fescue, tor-grass and common bent.
West Hoathly	West Hoathly		✓	0.7 hectares (1.7 acres)	NO	East Grinstead; 51.077°N 0.040°W; TQ 374 326	GCR	Map	Citation	This working quarry exposes clays of the Wadhurst Clay Formation, which is part of the Wealden Group, dating to the Early Cretaceous between 145 and 100 million years ago. The site lies close to a postulated gap in the London-Brabant Massif through which the Boreal Sea is thought to have periodically flowed, and it is described by Natural England as "important for interpreting environmental conditions at the northwestern extremity of the Wadhurst Clay outcrop".
Wolstonbury Hill	Wolstonbury Hill	✓		58.9 hectares (146 acres)	YES	Brighton; 50.909°N 0.175°W; TQ 284 138	SM	Map	Citation	This steeply sloping site is mainly grassland with areas of beach and oak woodland. The chalk grassland is species-rich, including rare plants such as round-headed rampion. It is the only known location in the county for Dyer’s greenweed and there are bee, fly, pyramidal and early purple orchids.
Woolbeding and Pound Commons	Woolbeding and Pound Commons	✓		171.9 hectares (425 acres)	YES	Midhurst; 51.022°N 0.964°W; SU 868 255		Map	Citation	The commons have areas of wet and dry heath, woodland, ponds and wet flushes. Invertebrates include a number of Red Data Book species, such as the bee Hylaeus gibbus, the Eumenes coarctatus and Psen bruxellensis wasps and the click-beetle Hylis olexai. The site also provides a habitat for three rare birds, woodlark, nightjar and Dartford warbler.
Woolmer Forest	Woolmer Forest	✓		1,298.5 hectares (3,209 acres)	PP	Liphook; 51.079°N 0.857°W; SU 802 317	NCR SAC SPA	Map	Citation	The forest has a nationally important heathland flora, with rare plants such as tower mustard, mossy stonecrop, shepherd’s cress and smooth cat’s-ear. The invertebrate fauna is very rich. There are extensive areas of open water and it is the only site in the country known to have all twelve native species of reptiles and amphibians.
Worth Forest	Worth Forest	✓		43.8 hectares (108 acres)	FP	Crawley; 51.083°N 0.154°W; TQ 294 331		Map	Citation	This ancient wood is in a ghyll formed by a stream which has eroded soft sandstone. The poorly drained valley bottom has carpets of Sphagnum while the upper slopes are dry and have a diverse community of mosses, liverworts and lichens.

== See also ==
- List of Local Nature Reserves in West Sussex
- Sussex Wildlife Trust

== Sources ==
- Ratcliffe, Derek, ed. (1977). A Nature Conservation Review. Vol. 2. Cambridge, UK: Cambridge University Press. ISBN 978-0-521-21403-2.
