= Upper Arun =

Coordinates: 50.988°N 0.514°W

- Site of Special Scientific Interest
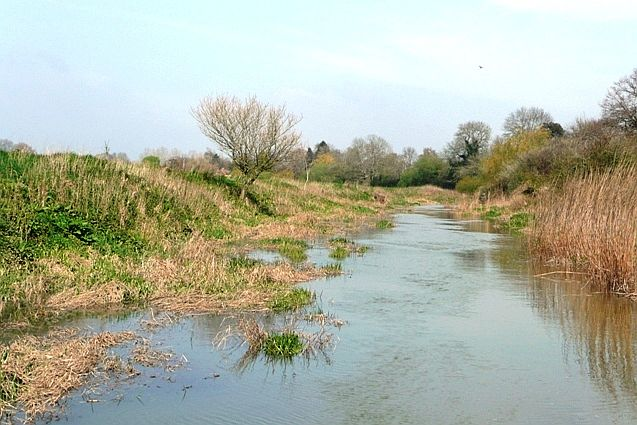
- Location of Upper Arun.
- Area of search: West Sussex
- Grid reference: TQ 044 220
- Interest: Biological
- Area: 17.6 hectares (43 acres)
- Notification date: 1988
- Location map: Magic Map

Upper Arun is a 17.6-hectare (43-acre) biological Site of Special Scientific Interest between Billingshurst and Pulborough in West Sussex.

This 13-kilometre (8-mile) long stretch of the River Arun provides the habitat for a rich riverine flora, such as common club-rush and reed canary-grass. It is an outstanding site for breeding dragonflies, including the clubtail, hairy, brilliant emerald and the nationally rare scarce chaser.
