= West Hoathly SSSI =

Protected area in West Sussex, England

Coordinates: 51.077°N 0.040°W

- Site of Special Scientific Interest
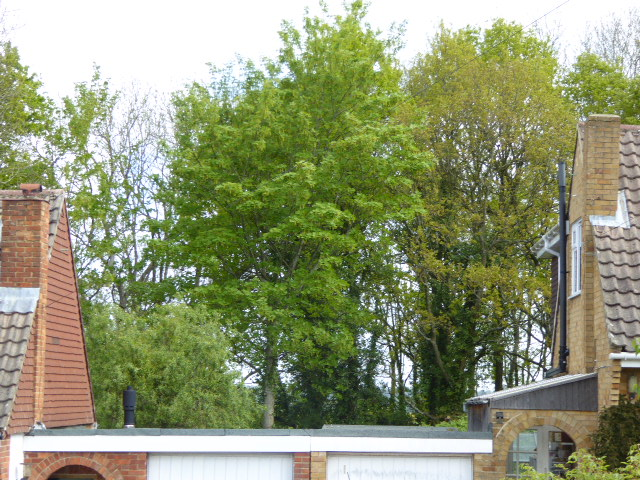
- View towards West Hoathly SSSI
- Location of West Hoathly SSSI.
- Area of search: West Sussex
- Grid reference: TQ 374 326
- Interest: Geological
- Area: 0.7 hectares (1.7 acres)
- Notification date: 1988
- Location map: Magic Map

West Hoathly SSSI is a 0.7-hectare (1.7-acre) geological Site of Special Scientific Interest in Sharpthorne in West Sussex. It is a Geological Conservation Review site.

== Description ==
This working quarry exposes clays of the Wadhurst Clay Formation, which is part of the Wealden Group, dating to the Early Cretaceous between 140 and 100 million years ago. The site lies close to a postulated gap in the London-Brabant Massif through which the Boreal Sea is thought to have periodically flowed, and it is described by Natural England as "important for interpreting environmental conditions at the northwestern extremity of the Wadhurst Clay outcrop".

The site is private land with no public access.
