= Buchan Hill Ponds =

UK Site of Special Scientific Interest

Coordinates: 51.094°N 0.226°W

- Site of Special Scientific Interest
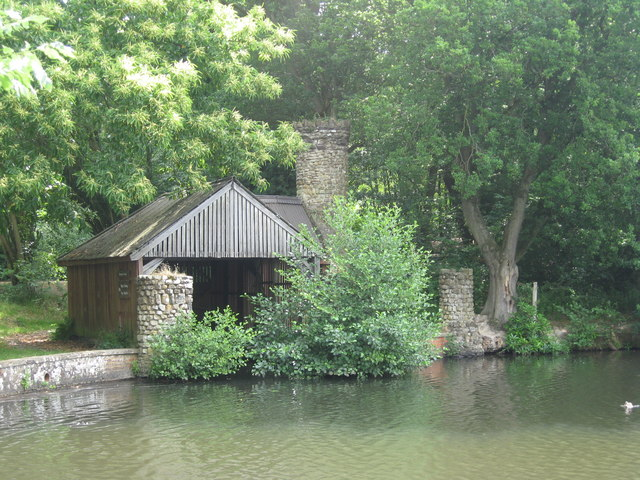
- Location of Buchan Hill Ponds.
- Area of search: West Sussex
- Grid reference: TQ 243 342
- Interest: Biological
- Area: 19.5 hectares (48 acres)
- Notification date: 1985
- Location map: Magic Map

Buchan Hill Ponds is a 19.5-hectare (48-acre) biological Site of Special Scientific Interest on the south-west outskirts of Crawley in West Sussex.

This site consists of two ponds and adjacent wet woodland. The ponds, which were formed by damming streams, have seventeen species of dragonfly, two of which are nationally uncommon, the hairy dragonfly and downy emerald. The woods have a rich ground flora, including marsh violet, opposite leaved golden saxifrage and wood avens.

The ponds are part of Buchan Country Park, which is open to the public.
