= Fyning Moor =

Protected area in West Sussex, England

Coordinates: 51.003°N 0.841°W

- Site of Special Scientific Interest
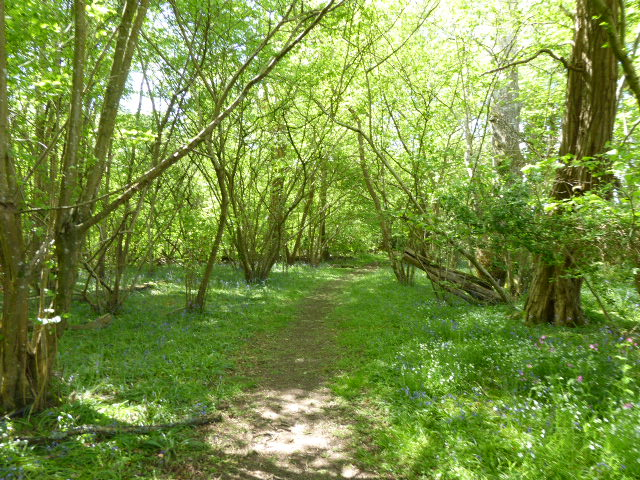
- Location of Fyning Moor.
- Area of search: West Sussex
- Grid reference: SU 814 233
- Interest: Biological
- Area: 12.8 hectares (32 acres)
- Notification date: 1984
- Location map: Magic Map

Fyning Moor is a 12.8-hectare (32-acre) biological Site of Special Scientific Interest south of Fyning in West Sussex.

This is a base-rich and springline alder wood, which is a nationally uncommon woodland type. Open rides have diverse flora and there are fens on the margins of a river. There are three nationally uncommon fly species, Xylota abiens, Ctenophora bimaculata and Rhobdomastix hilaris.

The site is private land but it is crossed by footpaths.
