= Rake Hanger =

Bio-scientific site in West Sussex

- Site of Special Scientific Interest
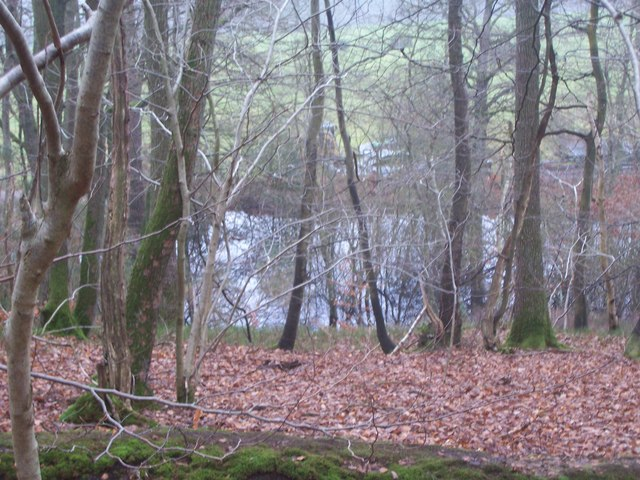

- Location within West Sussex
- Location of Rake Hanger.
- Area of search: West Sussex
- Grid reference: SU 795 266
- Coordinates: 51.033°N 0.868°W
- Interest: Biological
- Area: 28.2 hectares (70 acres)
- Notification date: 1988

Rake Hanger is a 28.2-hectare (70-acre) biological Site of Special Scientific Interest north-west of Midhurst in West Sussex.

Sessile oak is dominant on the steep slope of this site, while alder is the most common tree at the waterlogged foot of the scarp. There are lichens associated with ancient woodland, such as Thelotrema lepadinum and Haematomma elatinum. Great tussock sedge, bur-reed and great reedmace grow on the banks of two ponds.

A public footpath goes through the site.
