= Mills Rocks =

Coordinates: 51.115°N 0.118°E

- Site of Special Scientific Interest
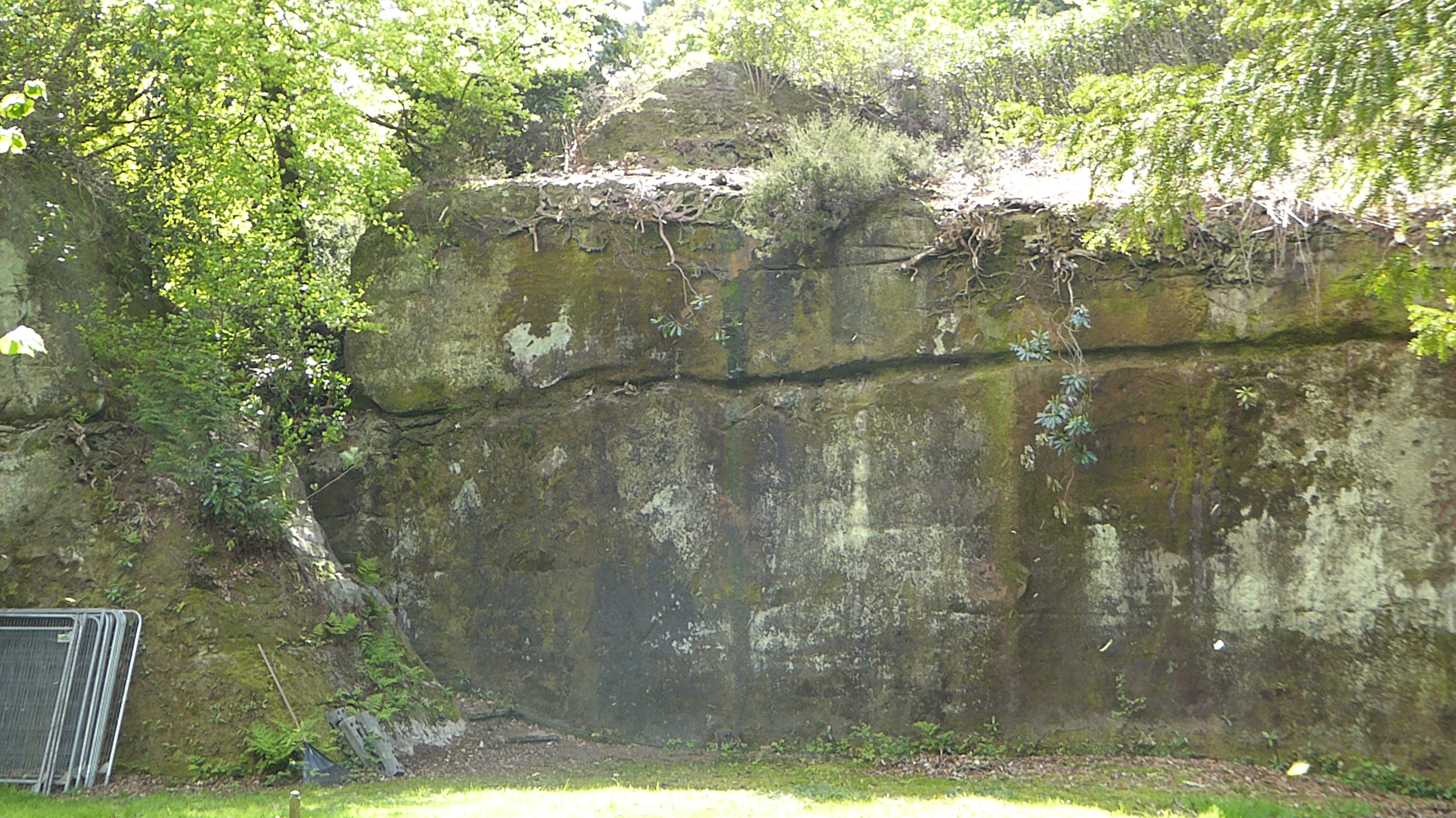
- Location of Mills Rocks.
- Area of search: West Sussex
- Grid reference: TQ 414 370
- Interest: Biological
- Area: 1.9 hectares (4.7 acres)
- Notification date: 1985
- Location map: Magic Map

Mills Rocks is a 1.9-hectare (4.7-acre) biological Site of Special Scientific Interest south-east of East Grinstead in West Sussex.

This site has rock outcrops with a number of rare plants, such as reed fescue grass at one of its only two locations in southern England. The rocks also support a rich variety of mosses and liverworts. There are also areas of woodland, bracken and bramble.

The site is private land but a public footpath runs through it.
