= Halnaker Chalk Pit =

Protected area in West Sussex, England

Coordinates: 50.872°N 0.692°W

- Site of Special Scientific Interest
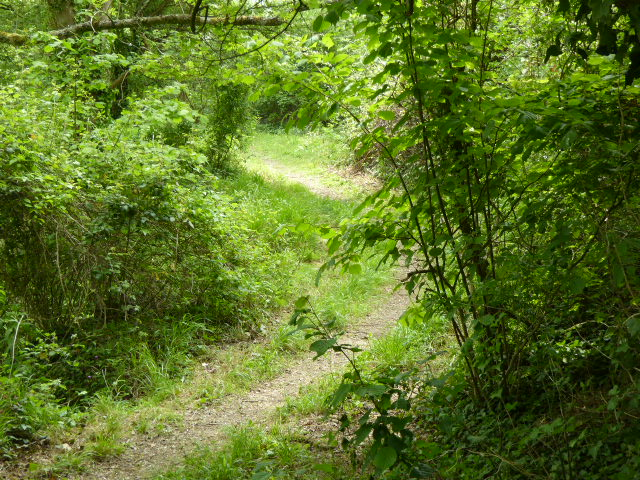
- Location of Halnaker Chalk Pit.
- Area of search: West Sussex
- Grid reference: SU 921 089
- Interest: Biological
- Area: 6.4 hectares (16 acres)
- Notification date: 1992
- Location map: Magic Map

Halnaker Chalk Pit is a 6.4-hectare (16-acre) biological Site of Special Scientific Interest north-east of Boxgrove in West Sussex.

This chalk pit is important as it has about 50% of the British population of a nationally rare and vulnerable plant, broad-leaved cudweed. Other plants include hoary plantain, scarlet pimpernel, bent grass, yellow-wort and autumn gentian.

The site is private land with no public access.
