= Sullington Warren =

Heath in the UK

Coordinates: 50.919°N 0.441°W

- Site of Special Scientific Interest
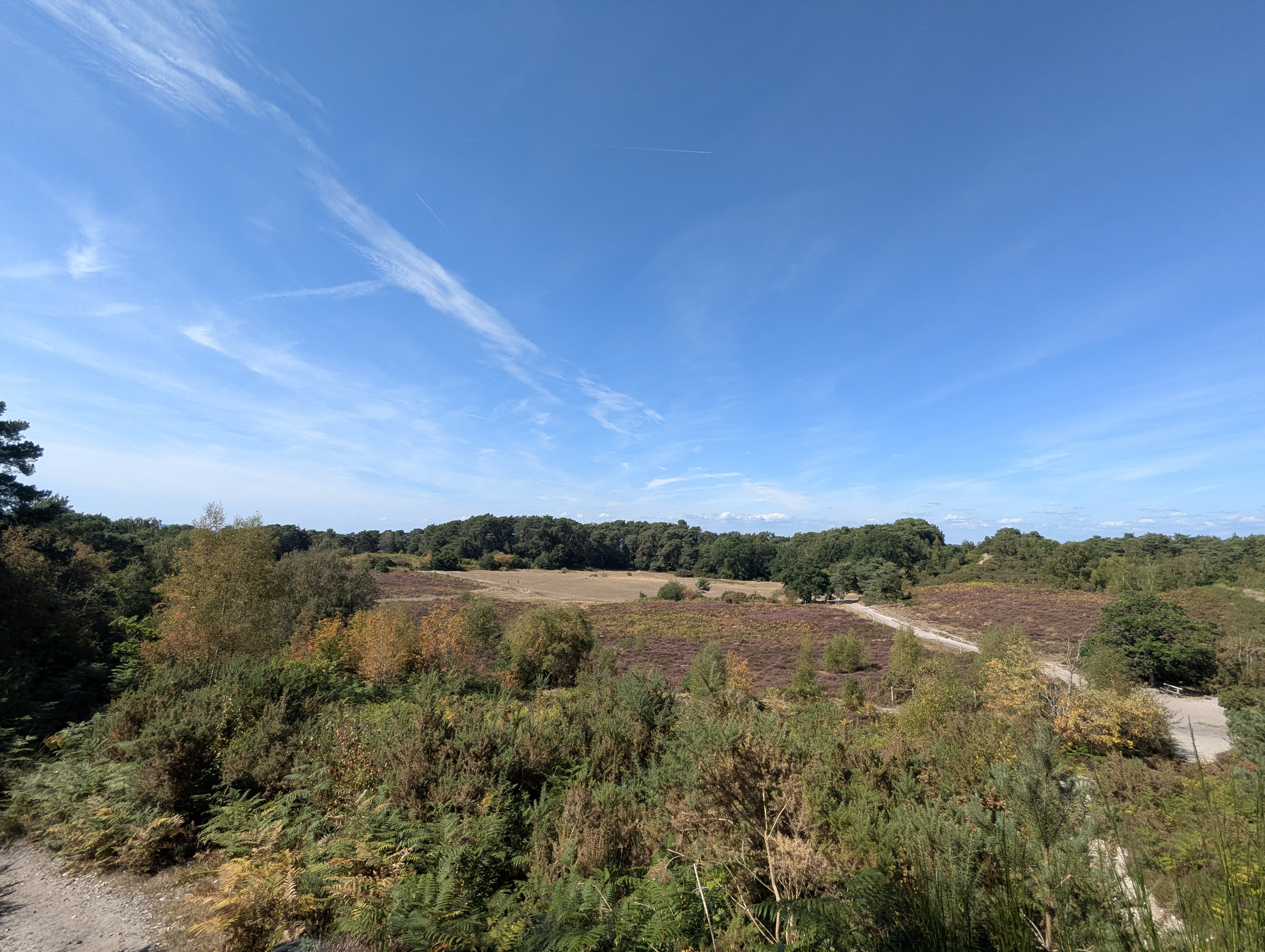
- Location of Sullington Warren.
- Area of search: West Sussex
- Grid reference: TQ 097 144
- Interest: Biological
- Area: 24.7 hectares (61 acres)
- Notification date: 1985-08-15
- Location map: Magic Map

Sullington Warren is a 24.7-hectare (61-acre) biological Site of Special Scientific Interest in Storrington in West Sussex. The site includes several tumuli which are Scheduled Monuments.

It is owned by the National Trust. The National Trust initially purchased 28 acres of land in 1935, with funds raised via a public subscription. Chanctonbury District Council acquired the remaining 35 acres in 1959. Their successor, Horsham District Council, gifted the 35 acres to the National Trust in 1985.

Most of this site is dry heath, but there are also areas of wet heath, scrub, bracken, woodland and grassland. Fauna include adders, lizards and insects such as the Sulligton Crane fly. Flora on the wet heath includes hare's-tail cottongrass and the insectivorous round-leaved sundew. Woodland birds include all three British species of woodpecker, treecreepers, long-tailed tits, nuthatches, nightingales and kestrels.

Located on site are the remains of a 19th-century windmill on the south side of the Warren. The windmill was destroyed by a fire in 1911.

There is access to the site from Water Lane.
