= Northpark Copse to Snapelands Copse =

Protected forest in West Sussex, UK

Coordinates: 51.019°N 0.711°W

- Site of Special Scientific Interest
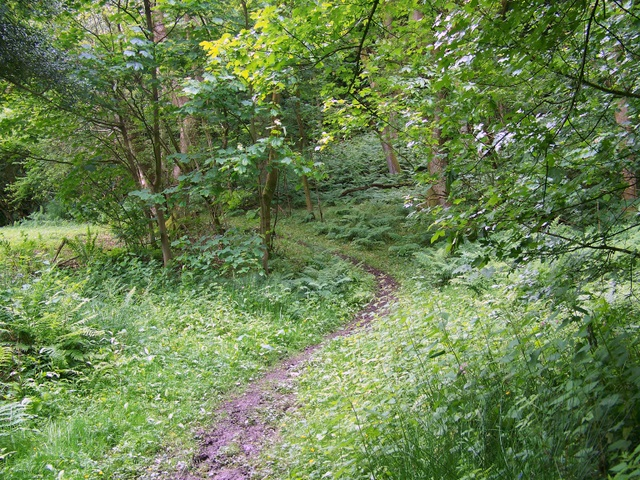
- Location of Northpark Copse to Snapelands Copse.
- Area of search: West Sussex
- Grid reference: SU 905 252
- Interest: Biological
- Area: 101.4 hectares (251 acres)
- Notification date: 1990
- Location map: Magic Map

Northpark Copse to Snapelands Copse is a 101.4-hectare (251-acre) biological Site of Special Scientific Interest north of Midhurst in West Sussex.

This site is important mainly because of its mosses and liverworts, which are relicts of a period 5000 years ago when the British climate was milder and wetter. There are old stools of Chestnut coppice which have six species of the moss genus Dicranum and liverworts include Bazzania trilobata, Marsupella emarginata and Kurzia sylvatica.
