= Duncton to Bignor Escarpment =

Protected area in West Sussex, England

Coordinates: 50.920°N 0.620°W

- Site of Special Scientific Interest
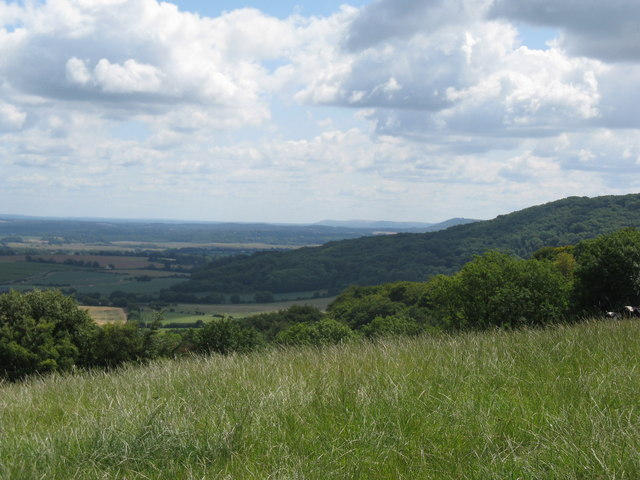
- Location of Duncton to Bignor Escarpment.
- Area of search: West Sussex
- Grid reference: SU 971 143
- Interest: Biological
- Area: 229.0 hectares (566 acres)
- Notification date: 1986
- Location map: Magic Map

Duncton to Bignor Escarpment is a 229-hectare (570-acre) biological Site of Special Scientific Interest west of Pulborough in West Sussex. It is a Special Area of Conservation and Bignor Hill is a Nature Conservation Review site, Grade I.

== Ecosystem ==
This steeply sloping site on the South Downs has mature beech woodland together with other habitats including chalk grassland and scrub. Invertebrates include the largest British population of the snail Helicodonta obvoluta and several rare moth species. A spring has a rich marginal vegetation including opposite-leaved golden saxifrage.
