= Bognor Common Quarry =

Coordinates: 50.983°N 0.564°W

- Site of Special Scientific Interest
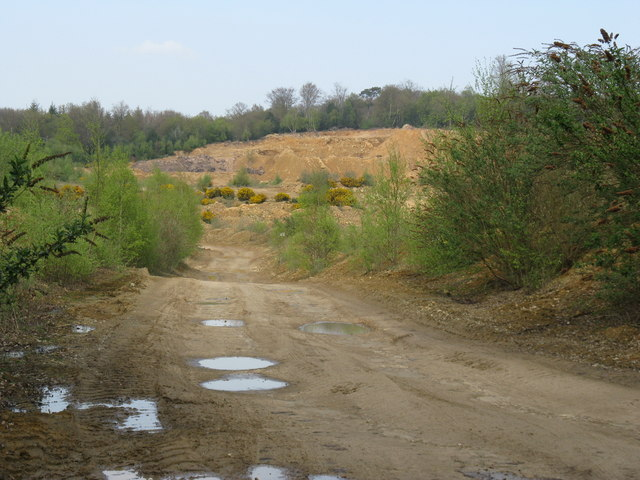
- Location of Bognor Common Quarry.
- Area of search: West Sussex
- Grid reference: TQ 009 214
- Interest: Geological
- Area: 25.1 hectares (62 acres)
- Notification date: 1987
- Location map: Magic Map

Bognor Common Quarry is a 25.1-hectare (62-acre) geological Site of Special Scientific Interest east of Petworth in West Sussex. It is a Geological Conservation Review site.

This site exposes the Hythe Beds, part of the Lower Greensand Group, which dates to the Early Cretaceous between 146 and 100 million years ago. Fuller's earth has been found on the site, which may derive from a volcanic source to the south.

The site is part of Bognor Common, which is open to the public.
