= Singleton and Cocking Tunnels =

Conservation area and bat hibernation site in England

Coordinates: 50.930°N 0.761°W

- Site of Special Scientific Interest
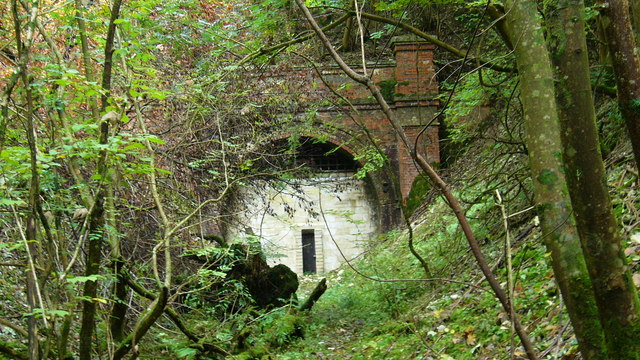
- Location of Singleton and Cocking Tunnels.
- Area of search: West Sussex
- Grid reference: SU 872 152
- Interest: Biological
- Area: 1.9 hectares (4.7 acres)
- Notification date: 1989
- Location map: Magic Map

Singleton and Cocking Tunnels is a 1.9-hectare (4.7-acre) biological Site of Special Scientific Interest between Chichester and Midhurst in West Sussex. It is also a Special Area of Conservation.

These disused railway tunnels are the fifth most important sites for hibernating bats in Britain and the most important in south-east England. They are the only known location in the country for the greater mouse-eared bat. Other species include Natterer's, Daubenton's, Brandt's and brown long-eared bats.

The site is private land with no public access.
