= Fairmile Bottom =

Protected area in West Sussex, England

Coordinates: 50.877°N 0.594°W

- Site of Special Scientific Interest
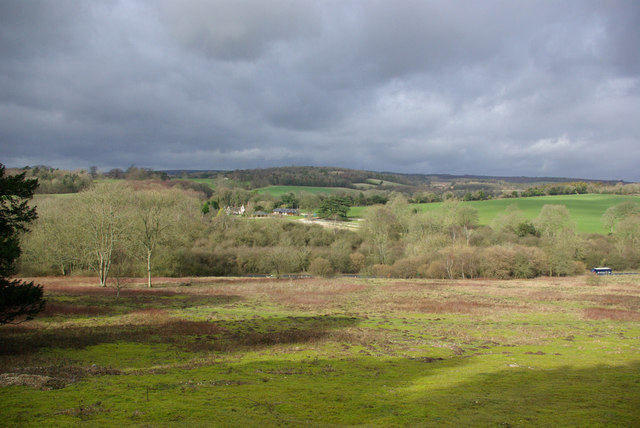
- Location of Fairmile Bottom.
- Area of search: West Sussex
- Grid reference: SU 990 095
- Interest: Biological
- Area: 70.2 hectares (173 acres)
- Notification date: 1987
- Location map: planning.data.gov.uk

Fairmile Bottom is a 70.2-hectare (173-acre) biological Site of Special Scientific Interest north-west of Arundel in West Sussex. An area of 61.3 hectares (151 acres) is also a Local Nature Reserve.

This is an area of scrub and mature woodland with scattered species-rich chalk grassland. Yew is dominant over much of the woods but in some parts there is a high proportion of beech. According to Natural England there is an "outstanding diversity of beetles" and butterflies include the white admiral and the uncommon silver-washed fritillary.
