= Pads Wood =

Protected area in West Sussex, England

Coordinates: 50.941°N 0.881°W

- Site of Special Scientific Interest
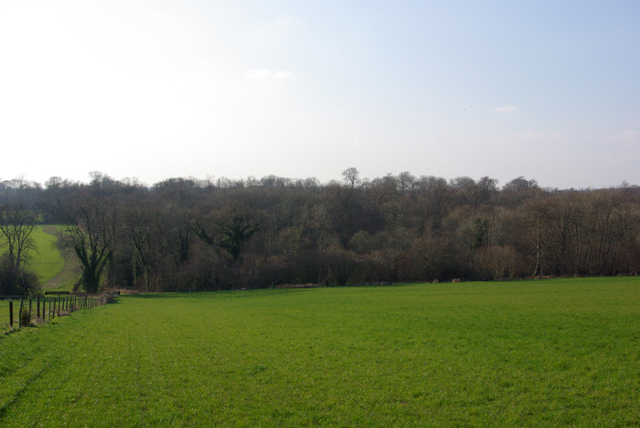
- Location of Pads Wood.
- Area of search: West Sussex
- Grid reference: SU 787 163
- Interest: Biological
- Area: 22.2 hectares (55 acres)
- Notification date: 1984
- Location map: Magic Map

Pads Wood is a 22.2-hectare (55-acre) biological Site of Special Scientific Interest west of Midhurst in West Sussex.

This ancient coppiced wood is mainly hazel and sweet chestnut with pedunculate oak and ash standards. The site has a rich lichen flora, most of which are epiphytic on the oak and ash standards, and a woodland ride has a rich display of flowering plants.

The site is private land with no public access.
