= Shillinglee Lake =

Lake in West Sussex, England

Coordinates: 51.070°N 0.620°W

- Site of Special Scientific Interest
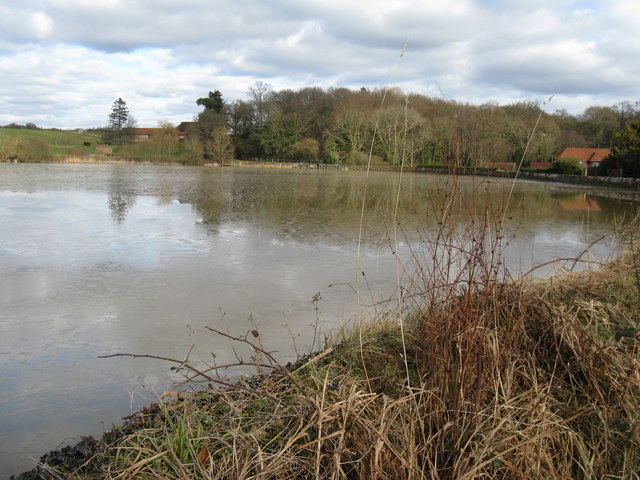
- Location of Shillinglee Lake.
- Area of search: West Sussex
- Grid reference: SU 968 310
- Interest: Biological
- Area: 17.0 hectares (42 acres)
- Notification date: 1985
- Location map: Magic Map

Shillinglee Lake is a 17-hectare (42-acre) biological Site of Special Scientific Interest west of Plaistow in West Sussex.

The lake has been designated an SSSI because it has four nationally uncommon plants. It is one of only ten locations in the country for Leersia oryzoides, a species of cut-grass. The other three are water mudwort, needle spikerush and six-stamen waterwort, all of which are found on mud when the water level is low.

Footpaths skirt the lake at several points.
