= Rook Clift =

Site of Special Scientific Interest in West Sussex

Coordinates: 50.957°N 0.835°W

- Site of Special Scientific Interest
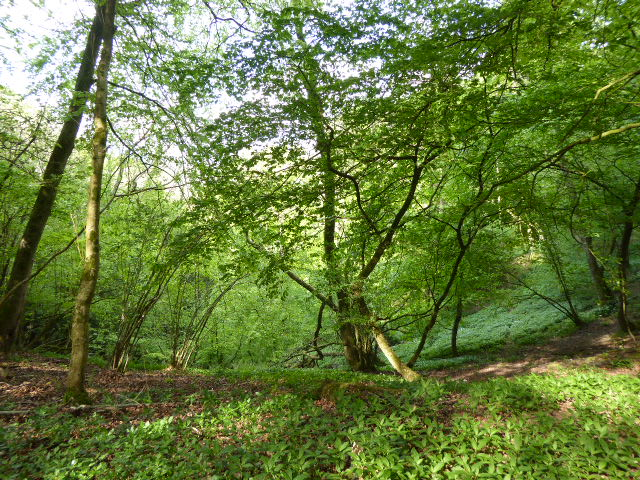
- Location of Rook Clift.
- Area of search: West Sussex
- Grid reference: SU 819 182
- Interest: Biological
- Area: 10.7 hectares (26 acres)
- Notification date: 1997
- Location map: Magic Map

Rook Clift is a 10.7-hectare (26-acre) biological Site of Special Scientific Interest east of South Harting in West Sussex. It is also a Special Area of Conservation.

A stream rises in this steep sided valley, which has semi-natural ancient woodland on its slopes. The canopy is dominated by a nationally scarce tree, large leaved lime, with other trees including beech and ash. The rich mollusc fauna includes Helicodonta obvoluta, which is a Red Data Book species.
