= Cow Wood and Harry's Wood =

Site of special scientific interest in West Sussex, England

Coordinates: 51.054°N 0.189°W

- Site of Special Scientific Interest
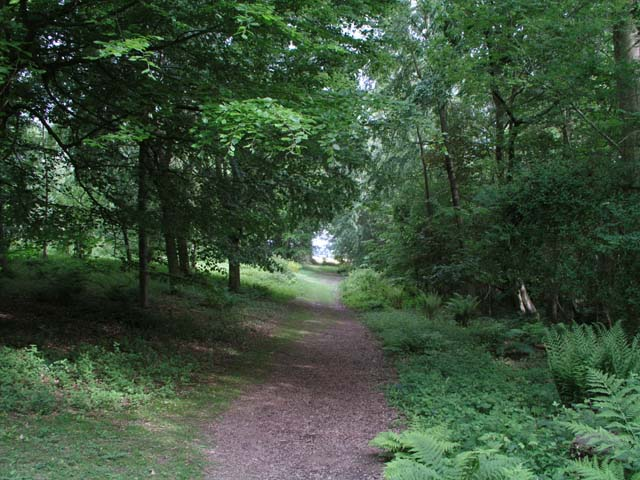
- Location of Cow Wood and Harry's Wood.
- Area of search: West Sussex
- Grid reference: TQ 270 298
- Interest: Biological
- Area: 75.5 hectares (187 acres)
- Notification date: 1985
- Location map: Magic Map

Cow Wood and Harry's Wood is a 75.5-hectare (187-acre) biological Site of Special Scientific Interest east of Handcross in West Sussex. it is in the High Weald Area of Outstanding Natural Beauty.

This area of ancient semi-natural woodland is crossed by ghylls, streams in steep valleys which have a warm and moist microclimate. Forty-seven species of breeding birds have been recorded, including wood warbler, willow tit, hawfinch and lesser spotted woodpecker.
