= Treyford to Bepton Down =

Biological site in Midhurst, West Sussex, England

Coordinates: 50.951°N 0.800°W

- Site of Special Scientific Interest
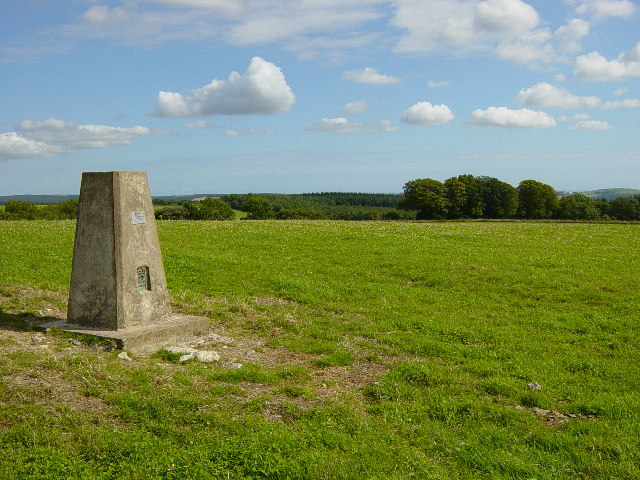
- Location of Treyford to Bepton Down.
- Area of search: West Sussex
- Grid reference: SU 844 175
- Interest: Biological
- Area: 121.5 hectares (300 acres)
- Notification date: 1985
- Location map: Magic Map

Treyford to Bepton Down is a 121.5-hectare (300-acre) biological Site of Special Scientific Interest south-west of Midhurst in West Sussex.

This site consists of five separate blocks of steeply sloping chalk grassland and yew woodland on the South Downs. The grassland has a rich variety of species, including herbs such as round-headed rampion, horseshoe vetch and carline thistle, while there are orchids such as frog, bee and musk. The uncommon moss Rhacomitrium lanuginosum has also been recorded.
