= St Leonard's Park Ponds =

Biological site in West Sussex

Coordinates: 51.063°N 0.290°W

- Site of Special Scientific Interest
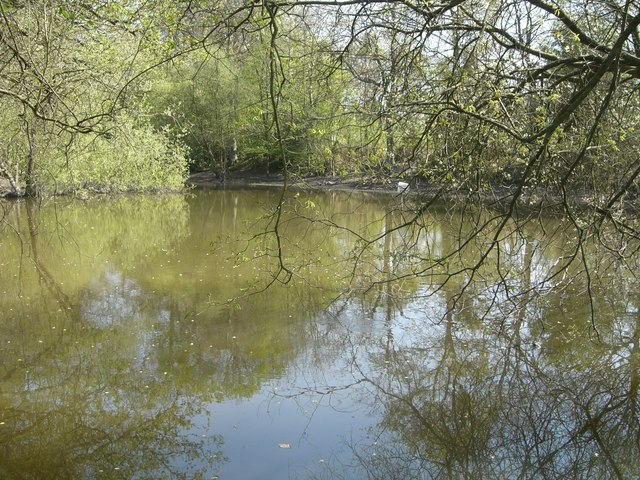
- Location of St Leonard's Park Ponds.
- Area of search: West Sussex
- Grid reference: TQ 199 306
- Interest: Biological
- Area: 3.9 hectares (9.6 acres)
- Notification date: 1986
- Location map: Magic Map

St Leonard's Park Ponds is a 3.9-hectare (9.6-acre) biological Site of Special Scientific Interest east of Horsham in West Sussex.

These ponds and adjacent woodland provide habitats for a wide variety of dragonflies and damselflies, including some uncommon species such as the variable damselfly The banks have rich flora including the nationally rare yellow centaury. There are also several unusual mosses and liverworts.

The park is not open to the public, but a public footpath runs along the north bank of the ponds.
