= Hurston Warren =

Site of Special Scientific Interest

Coordinates: 50.943°N 0.477°W

- Site of Special Scientific Interest
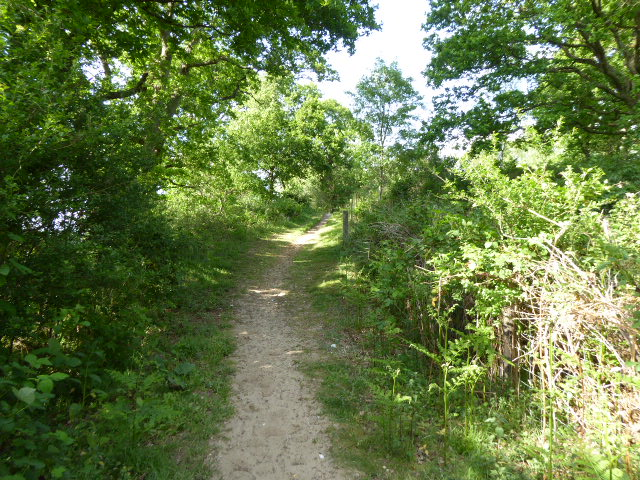
- Location of Hurston Warren.
- Area of search: West Sussex
- Grid reference: TQ 071 170
- Interest: Biological
- Area: 69.1 hectares (171 acres)
- Notification date: 1985
- Location map: Magic Map

Hurston Warren is a 69.1-hectare (171-acre) biological Site of Special Scientific Interest south-east of Pulborough in West Sussex.

This site has a variety of habitats, including wet and dry heath, bogs, woodland and open water. One of the bogs is a quaking bog, where a floating raft of vegetation covers open water or fluid peat; it has flora such as round-leaved sundew, bog asphodel, hare's-tail cottongrass and cranberry. A golf course occupies much of the heath.
