= Perry Copse Outcrop =

Coordinates: 51.051°N 0.730°W

- Site of Special Scientific Interest
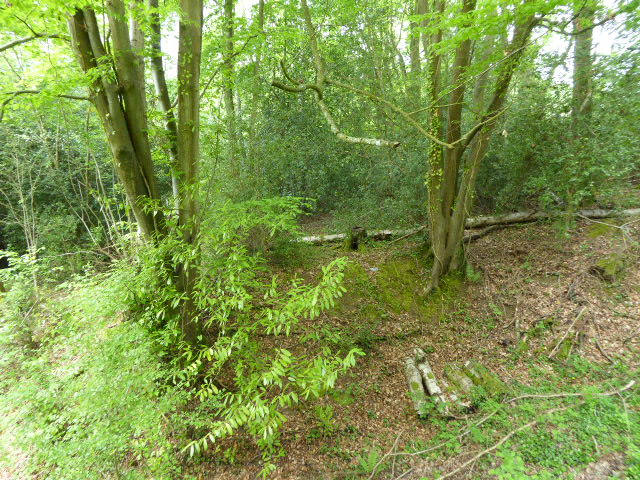
- Location of Perry Copse Outcrop.
- Area of search: West Sussex
- Grid reference: SU 891 287
- Interest: Geological
- Area: 0.2 hectares (0.49 acres)
- Notification date: 1992
- Location map: Magic Map

Perry Copse Outcrop is a 0.2-hectare (0.49-acre) geological Site of Special Scientific Interest in Fernhurst in West Sussex. It is a Geological Conservation Review site.

This site dates to the Early Cretaceous, between 140 and 100 million years ago. The steep banks of a stream expose a 5-metre (16-foot) high section of the Netherside Sand Member, part of the Weald Clay Group. There are 1 metre (3.3 feet) high fossils of Lycopodites in upright position.

The site is private land with no public access.
