= Arun Banks =

UK Site of Special Scientific Interest

Coordinates: 50.881°N 0.542°W

- Site of Special Scientific Interest
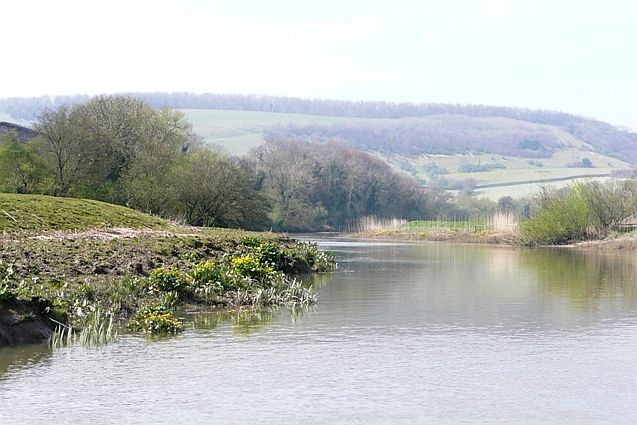
- Location of Arun Banks.
- Area of search: West Sussex
- Grid reference: TQ 027 101
- Interest: Biological
- Area: 25.8 hectares (64 acres)
- Notification date: 1985
- Location map: Magic Map

Arun Banks is a 25.8-hectare (64-acre) biological Site of Special Scientific Interest north of Arundel in West Sussex.

This site consists of a tidal stretch of the River Arun and a cut-off meander loop. The diverse flora includes reed sweet grass, sea club-rush and glaucous bulrush. The river banks have wet grassland, scrub, woodland and drainage ditches with tall fen.
