= Warnham SSSI =

Protected area in West Sussex, England

Coordinates: 51.104°N 0.319°W

- Site of Special Scientific Interest
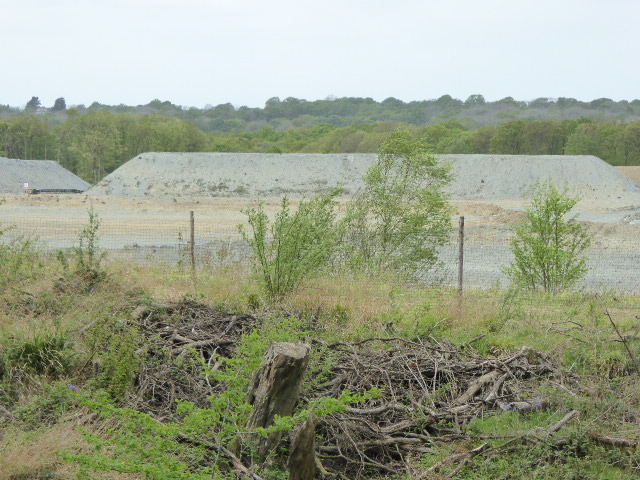
- Location of Warnham SSSI.
- Area of search: West Sussex
- Grid reference: TQ 178 352
- Interest: Geological
- Area: 28.5 hectares (70 acres)
- Notification date: 1992
- Location map: Magic Map

Warnham SSSI is a 28.5-hectare (70-acre) geological Site of Special Scientific Interest north of Horsham in West Sussex. It is a Geological Conservation Review site.

This site exposes rocks of the Weald Clay Group, dating to the Lower Cretaceous around 130 million years ago. It preserves fossil plants from freshwater and brackish-marine environments.

The site is private land with no public access.
