= Arundel Park =

UK Site of Special Scientific Interest

Coordinates: 50.873°N 0.565°W

- Site of Special Scientific Interest
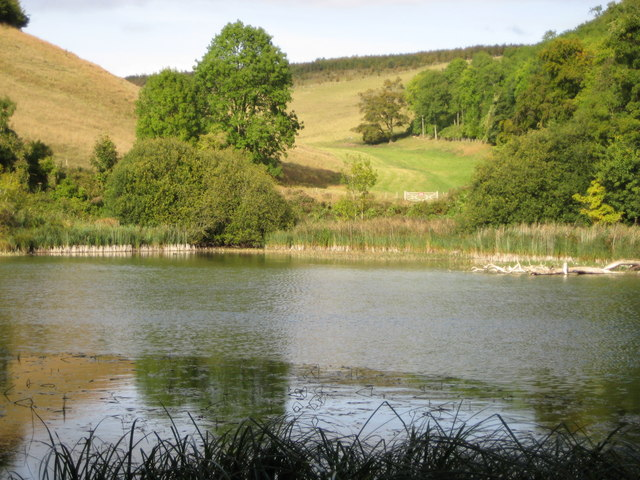
- Swanbourne Lake
- Location of Arundel Park.
- Area of search: West Sussex
- Grid reference: TQ 011 091
- Interest: Biological
- Area: 134.0 hectares (331 acres)
- Notification date: 1987
- Location map: Magic Map

Arundel Park is a 134-hectare (330-acre) biological Site of Special Scientific Interest north of Arundel in West Sussex.

This old deer park on the chalk of the South Downs has an ancient artificial lake, Swanbourne Lake. The site is described by Natural England as one of the most important sites in the country for invertebrates. There are fifteen endangered species, including the field cricket Gryllus campestris and the beetle Laemophloeus monilis. Another rarity is the mollusc Pseudamnicola confusa. There is also a diverse breeding bird community.

The site is open to the public.
