= Amberley Mount to Sullington Hill =

Biological site in England

Coordinates: 50.901°N 0.497°W

- Site of Special Scientific Interest
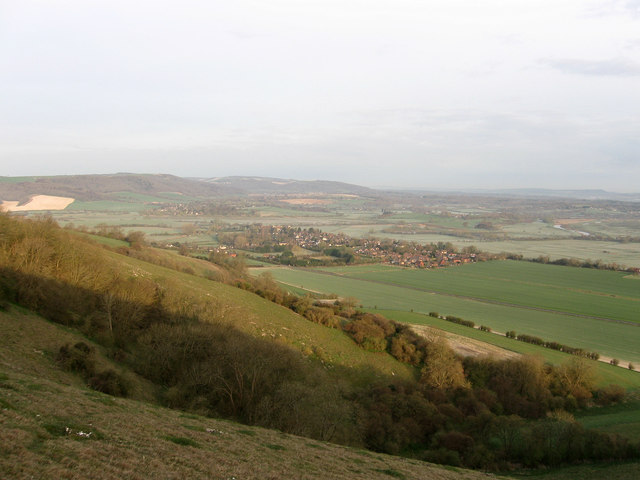
- Location of Amberley Mount to Sullington Hill.
- Area of search: West Sussex
- Grid reference: TQ 058 124
- Interest: Biological
- Area: 177.2 hectares (438 acres)
- Notification date: 1986
- Location map: Magic Map

Amberley Mount to Sullington Hill is a 177.2-hectare (438-acre) biological Site of Special Scientific Interest south-west of Storrington in West Sussex.

This site has chalk grassland and scrub on the slope of the South Downs. It has several unusual butterflies, moths and snails, including the light feathered rustic and juniper carpet moths and the rare Adonis blue butterfly.
