= Felpham SSSI =

Geological site in West Sussex

Coordinates: 50.785°N 0.655°W

- Site of Special Scientific Interest
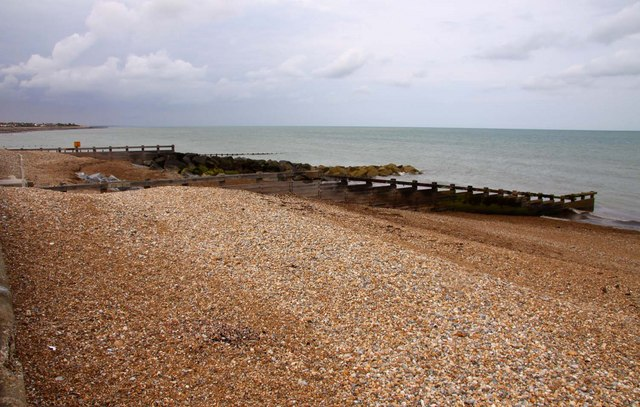
- Location of Felpham SSSI.
- Area of search: West Sussex
- Grid reference: SZ 949 992
- Interest: Geological
- Area: 1.0 hectare (2.5 acres)
- Notification date: 1988
- Location map: Magic Map

Felpham SSSI is a 1-hectare (2.5-acre) geological Site of Special Scientific Interest in Bognor Regis in West Sussex. It is a Geological Conservation Review site.

This short stretch of shoreline is one of only three in Britain to have fossils of flora dating to the Paleocene, the first epoch after the Cretaceous–Paleogene extinction event 66 million years ago. It has yielded four previously unknown genera and sixteen new species.

The beach is open to the public.
