= West Harting Down SSSI =

Protected area in West Sussex, England

Coordinates: 50.956°N 0.918°W

- Site of Special Scientific Interest
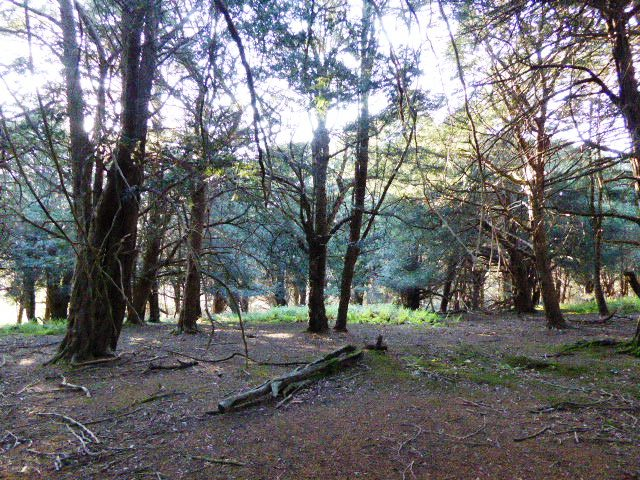
- Location of West Harting Down SSSI.
- Area of search: West Sussex
- Grid reference: SU 761 179
- Interest: Biological
- Area: 13.9 hectares (34 acres)
- Notification date: 1985
- Location map: Magic Map

West Harting Down SSSI is a 13.9-hectare (34-acre) biological Site of Special Scientific Interest west of South Harting in West Sussex. It is part of the 317.9-hectare (786-acre) West Harting Down, which is owned and managed by Forestry England.

This is mainly mature yew forest on the chalk of the South Downs. There are also areas of chalk grassland with flora such as rock rose, carnation sedge, perforate St John’s wort and salad burnet, with grasses such as red fescue, tor-grass and common bent.

The Sussex Border Path runs through West Harting Down close to the SSSI.
