= British nature conservation statuses =

In Britain, a variety of status categorisation schemes exist, for sites, species and habitats. These include, for species and habitats, Red Data Book threat categories, national rarity and scarcity assessments and Biodiversity Action Plan statuses, and for sites, statutory statuses such as the SSSI concept, and non-statutory statuses such as county wildlife sites.

The most widely established assessment system for rarity and scarcity is based around presence of species in the hectads (i.e. 10 x 10 km grid squares) of the Ordnance Survey National Grid. Nationally Rare is conventionally defined as species which are found in 15 or fewer hectads. Nationally Scarce (also termed Nationally Notable) relates to species which are found in between 16 and 100 hectads. This category is subdivided into Nationally Scarce (Nationally Notable) A—species found in 16 to 30 hectads, and Nationally Scarce (Nationally Notable) B—species found in between 31 and 100 hectads. A status of Local is also sometimes used, referring to species found in between 101 and 300 hectads.

Sites of Special Scientific Interest are sites which are of importance for their biological or geological interest, and are protected from damage under legislation such as the Wildlife and Countryside Act.

A Special Protection Area is an area of importance for birds, protected under European legislation.
