= House Copse =

Site of special scientific interest in West Sussex, England

Coordinates: 51.107°N 0.249°W

- Site of Special Scientific Interest
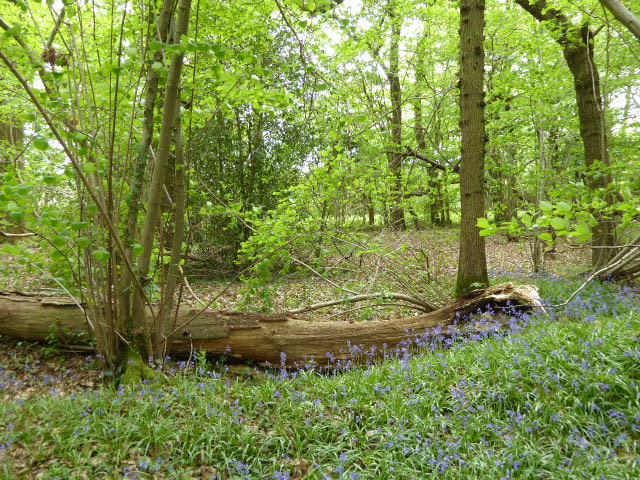
- Location of House Copse.
- Area of search: West Sussex
- Grid reference: TQ 227 357
- Interest: Biological
- Area: 12.5 hectares (31 acres)
- Notification date: 1983
- Location map: Magic Map

House Copse is a 12.5-hectare (31-acre) biological Site of Special Scientific Interest west of Crawley in West Sussex.

This ancient wood was formerly managed as hornbeam and small-leaved lime coppice with oak standards. There is limited ground flora in densely shaded areas, but the banks of a stream have more diverse flora, including dog’s mercury, wood avens, bugle and enchanter’s nightshade.

The site is private land with no public access.
