= East Dean Park Wood =

Protected area in West Sussex, England

Coordinates: 50.899°N 0.722°W

- Site of Special Scientific Interest
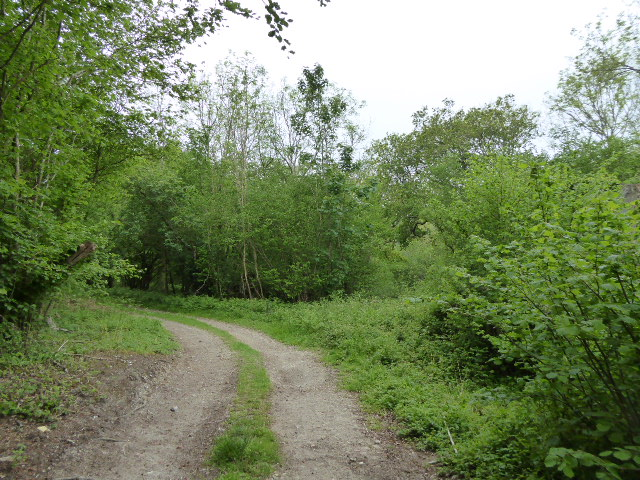
- Location of East Dean Park Wood.
- Area of search: West Sussex
- Grid reference: SU 900 118
- Interest: Biological
- Area: 17.8 hectares (44 acres)
- Notification date: 1988
- Location map: Magic Map

East Dean Park Wood is a 17.8-hectare (44-acre) biological Site of Special Scientific Interest south of East Dean in West Sussex.

Dry sheltered woods on chalk downland were once common in the county, but this site is one of the few surviving examples. More than 100 species of woodland plant have been recorded, such as spurge laurel and early-purple orchid. There is a nationally important epiphytic flora, including over 80 lichens and 44 mosses and liverworts.

The site is private land with no public access.
