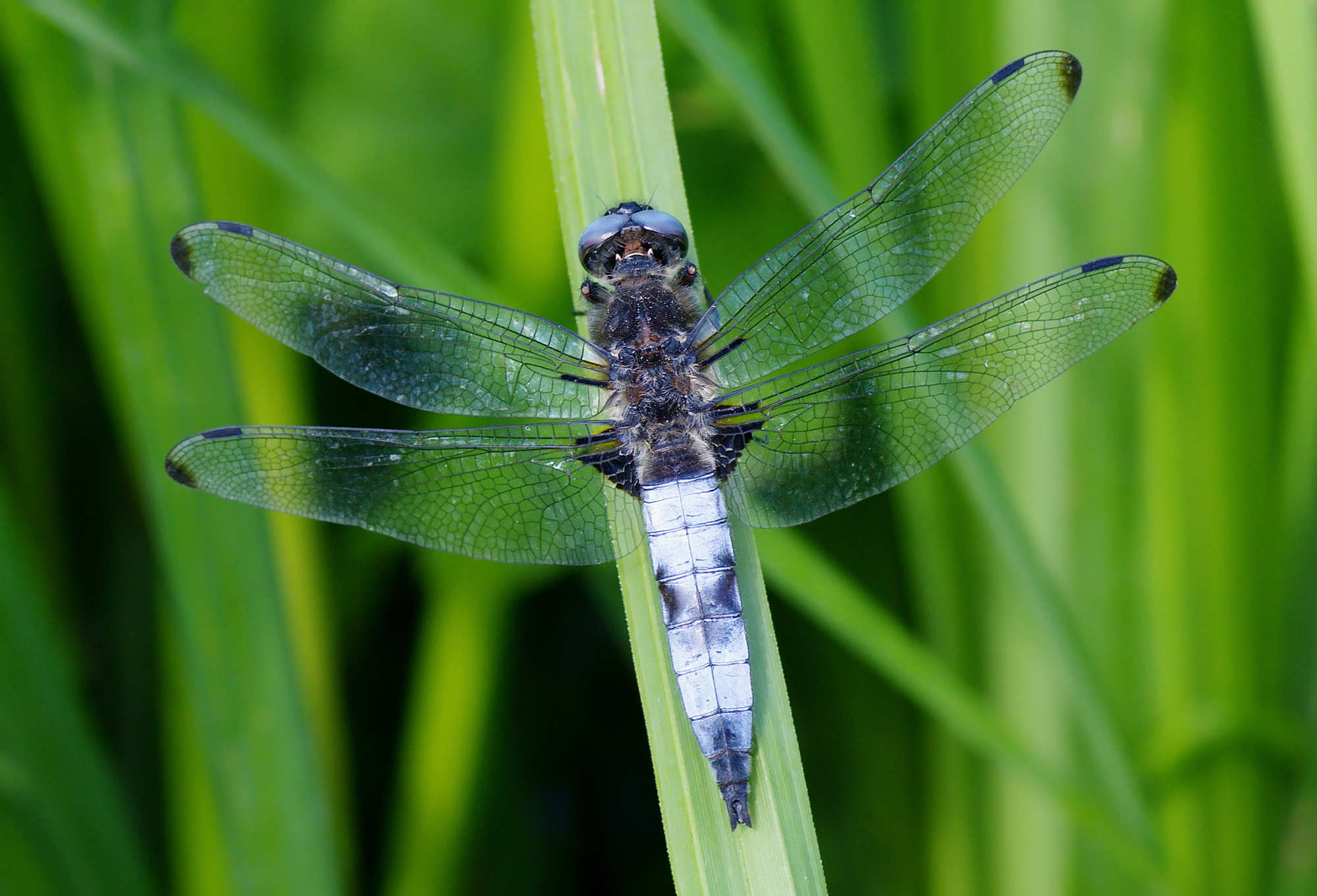
- Male
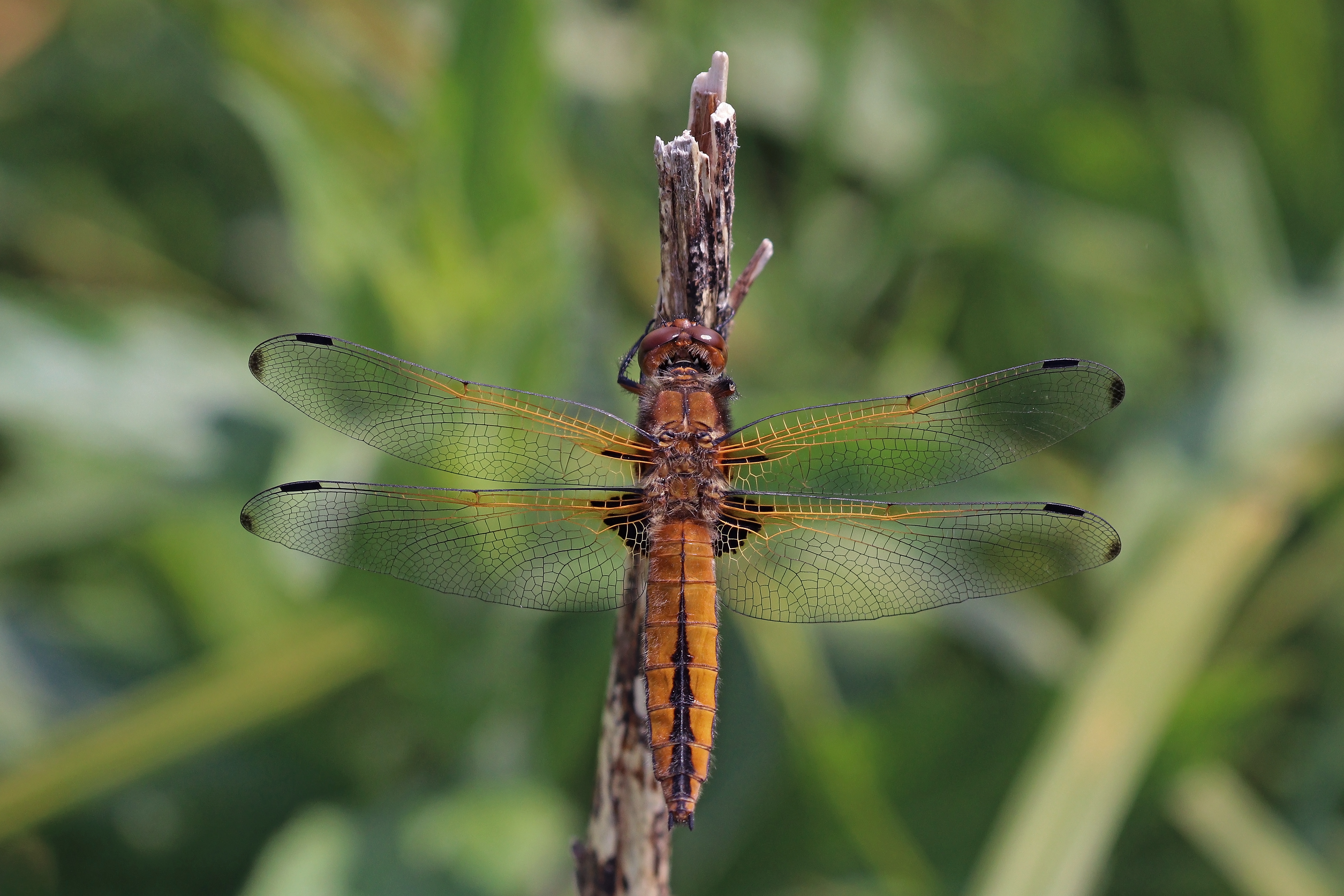
- Immature female

Scientific classification
- Kingdom: Animalia
- Phylum: Arthropoda
- Clade: Pancrustacea
- Class: Insecta
- Order: Odonata
- Infraorder: Anisoptera
- Family: Libellulidae
- Genus: Libellula
- Species: L. fulva

Binomial name
- Libellula fulva (O.F. Müller, 1764)

= Scarce chaser =

Species of dragonfly

The scarce chaser (Libellula fulva) is a species of dragonfly. The adult male has a bright blue abdomen with patches of black, while the adult female and juvenile male each have a bright orange abdomen. It is about 45 mm in length with an average wingspan of 74 mm. It is distributed throughout Europe. This dragonfly is considered a species of special concern in Great Britain due to loss of its specific ideal habitat.

This species lives on floodplains and marshes with dense, abundant vegetation, and females deposit their eggs in slow-current streams. Once deposited by the female, the eggs lie embedded in the mud of the riverbed and the larvae develop underwater for usually two years. Adults live from May to August, during which time they mate and lay eggs.

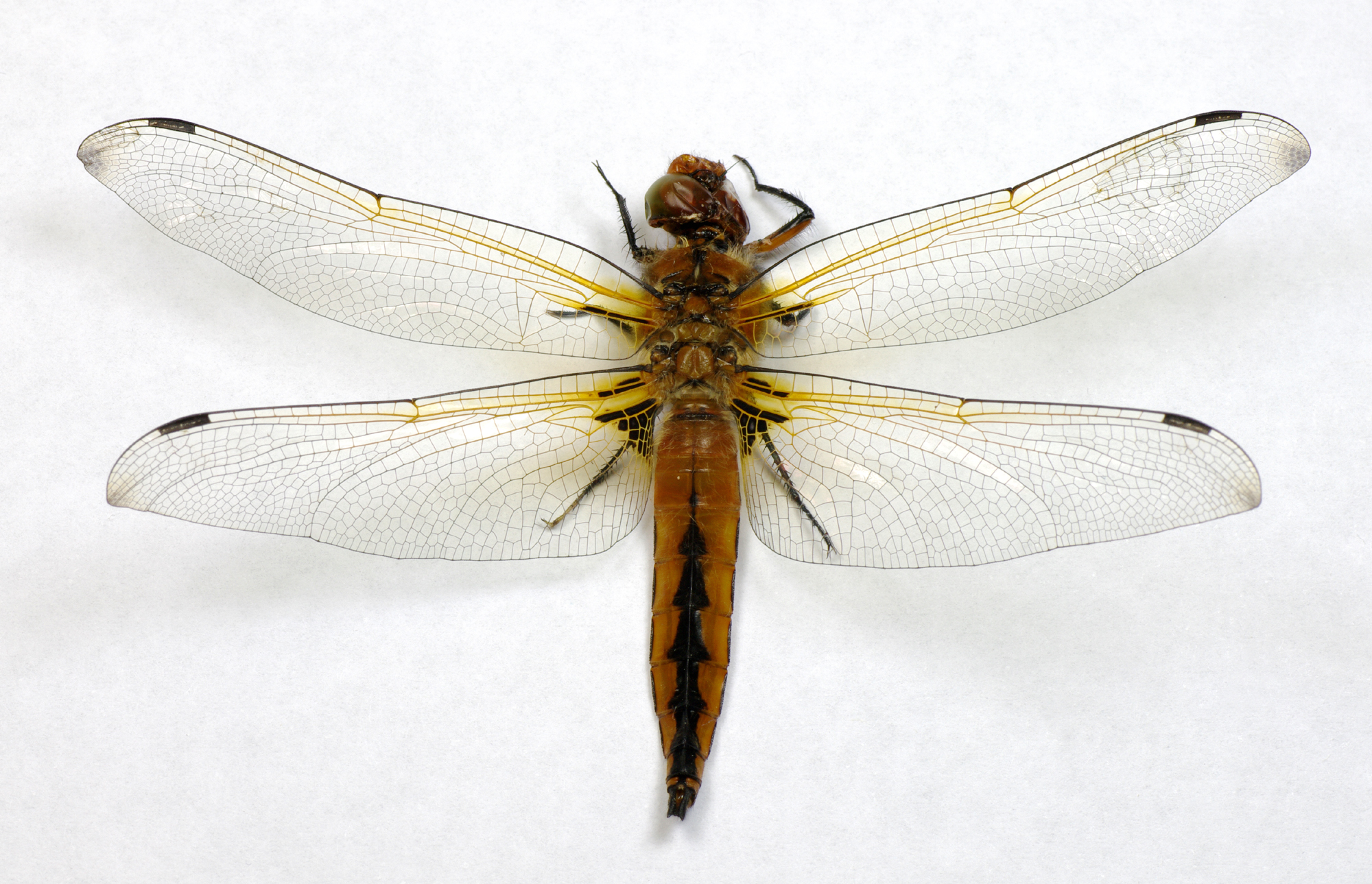
Immature male (dead)

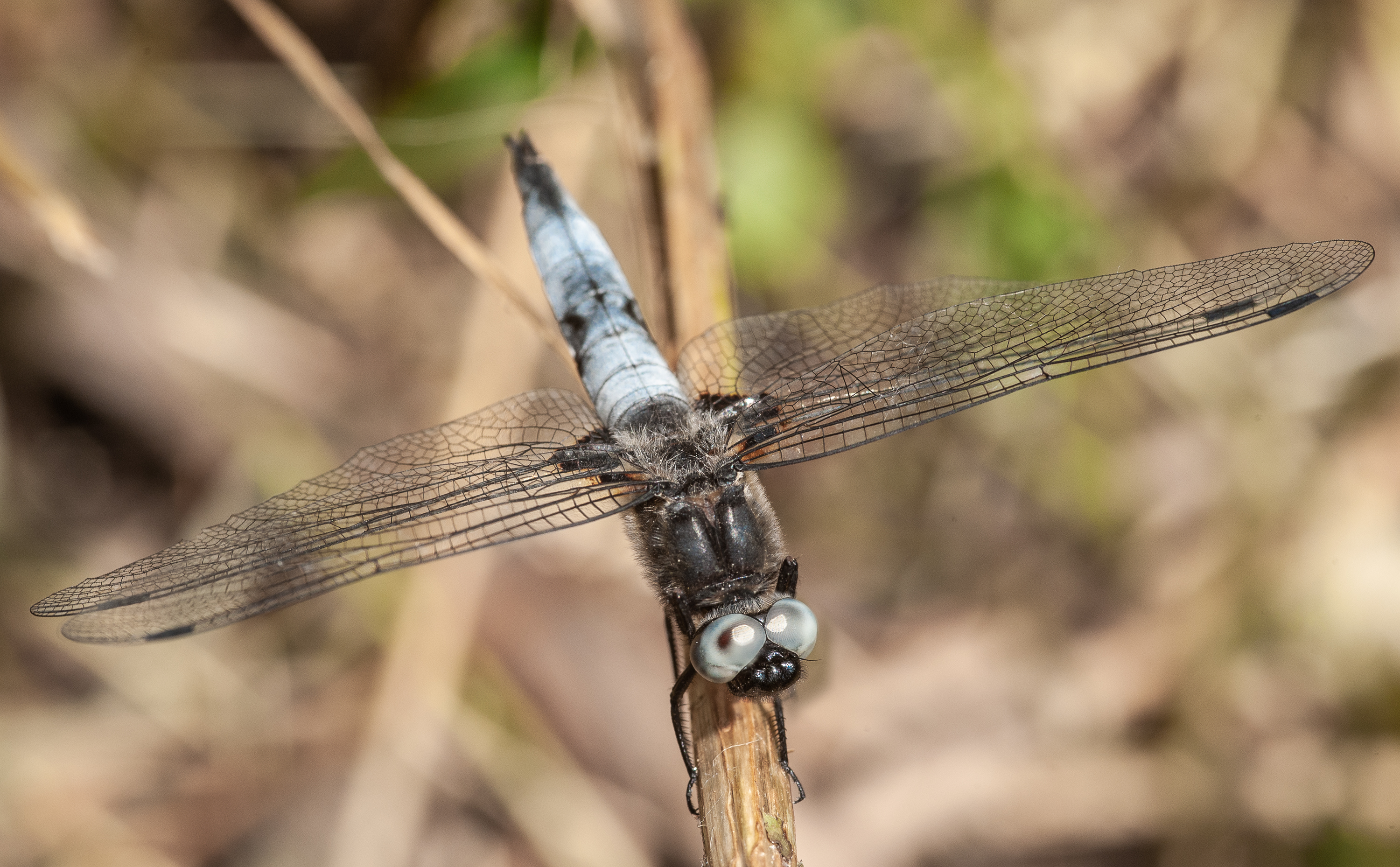
Adult male without spotting on the wing tips

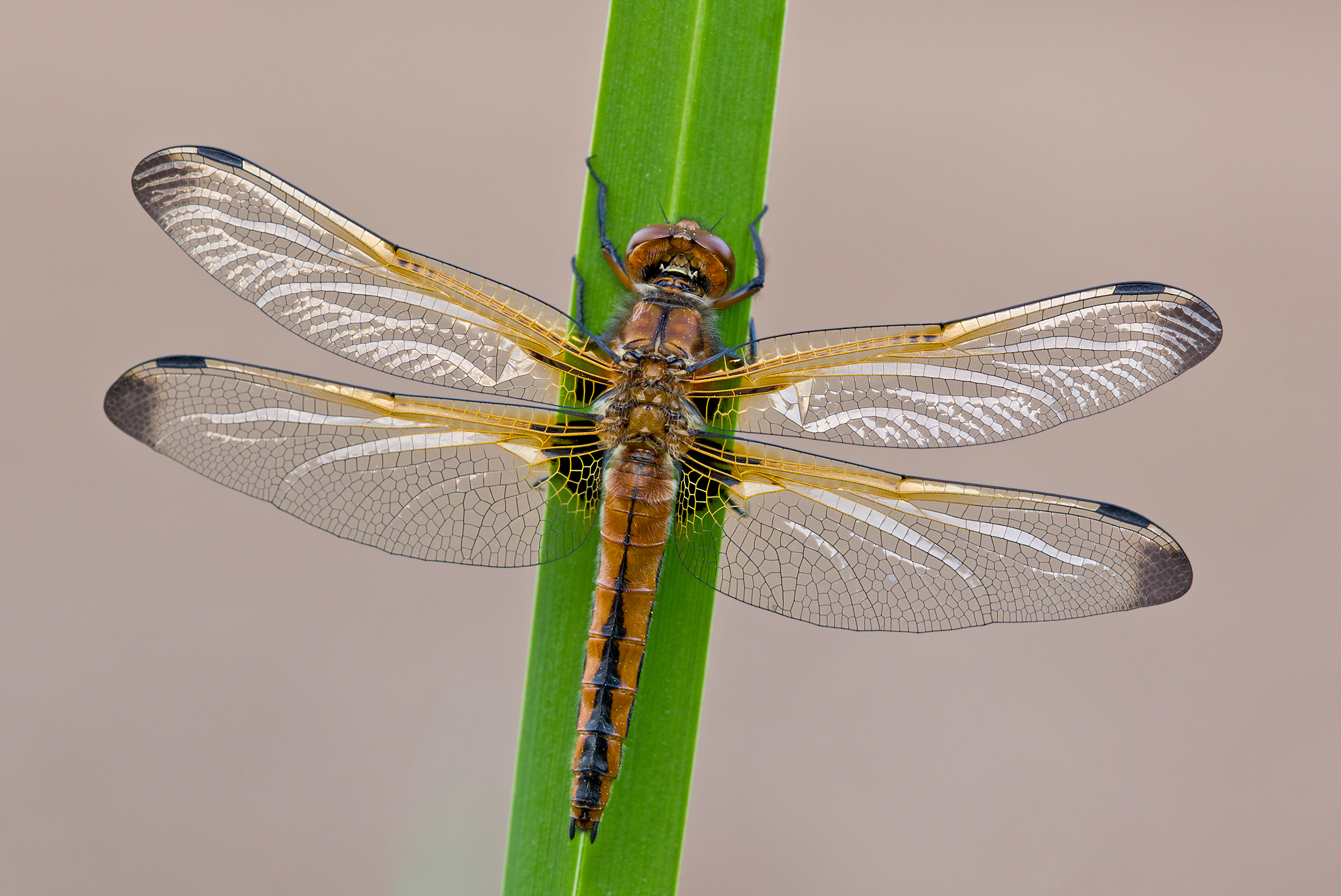
Immature female with distinct spotting on the wing tips

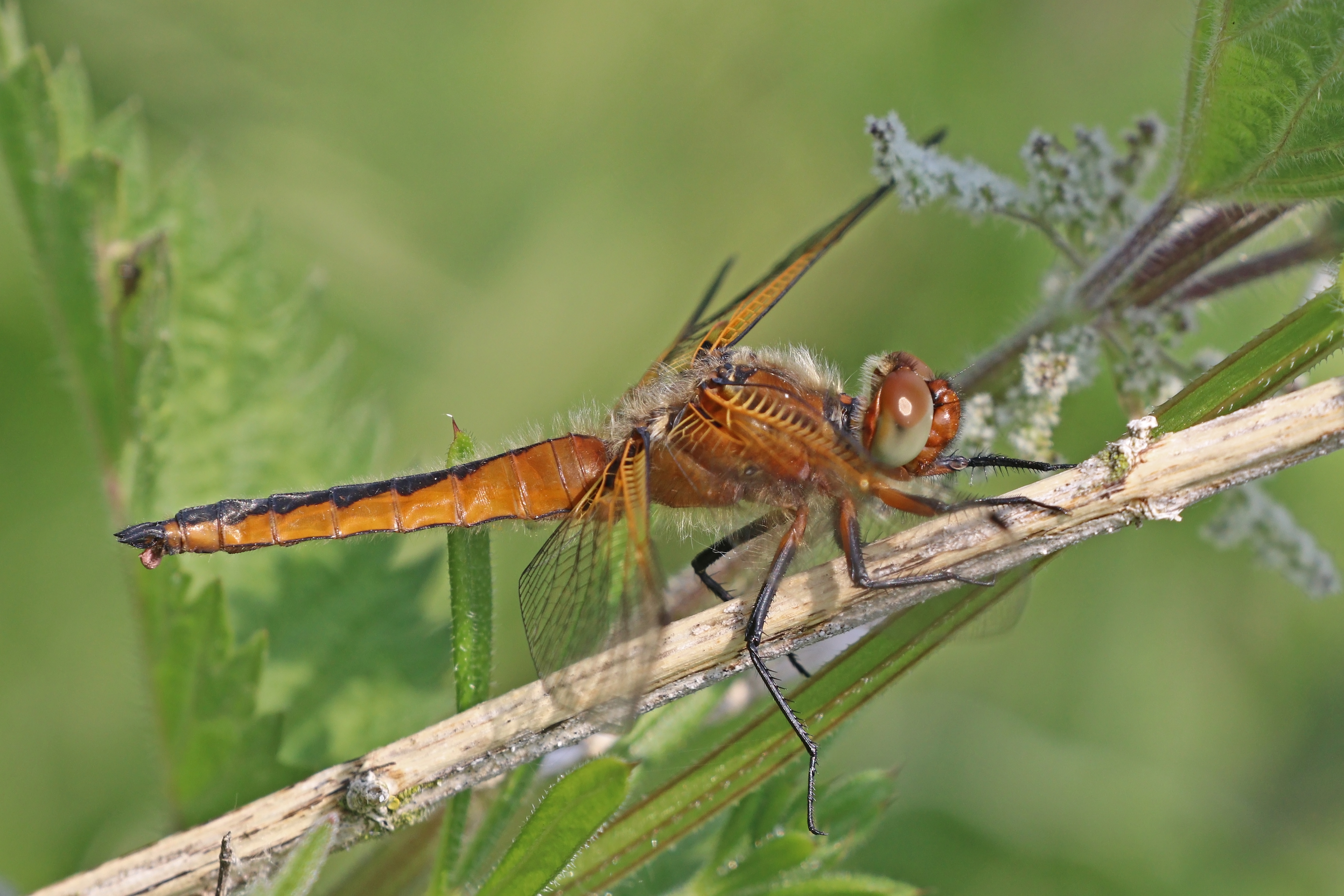
Immature male

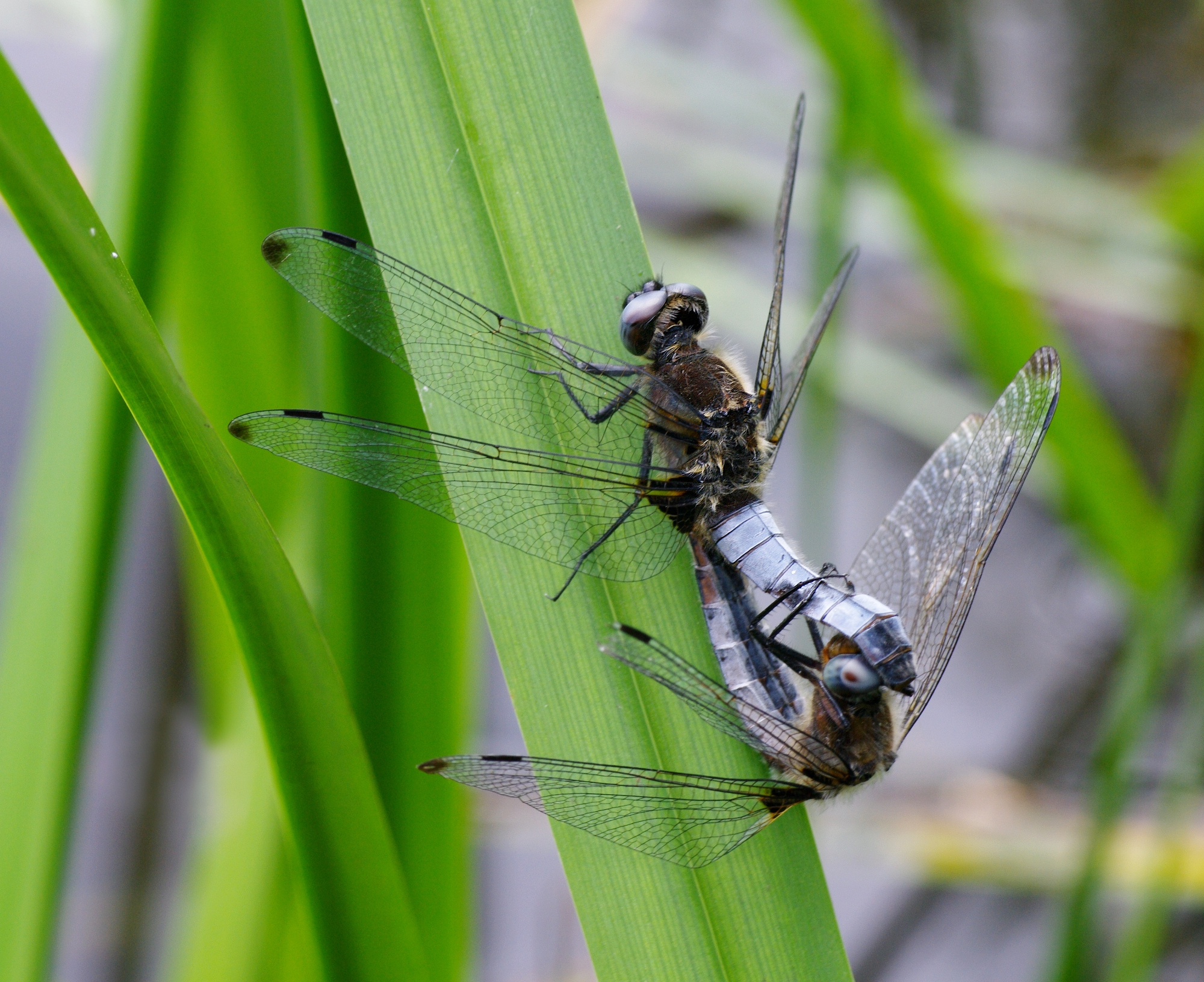
Mating wheel
