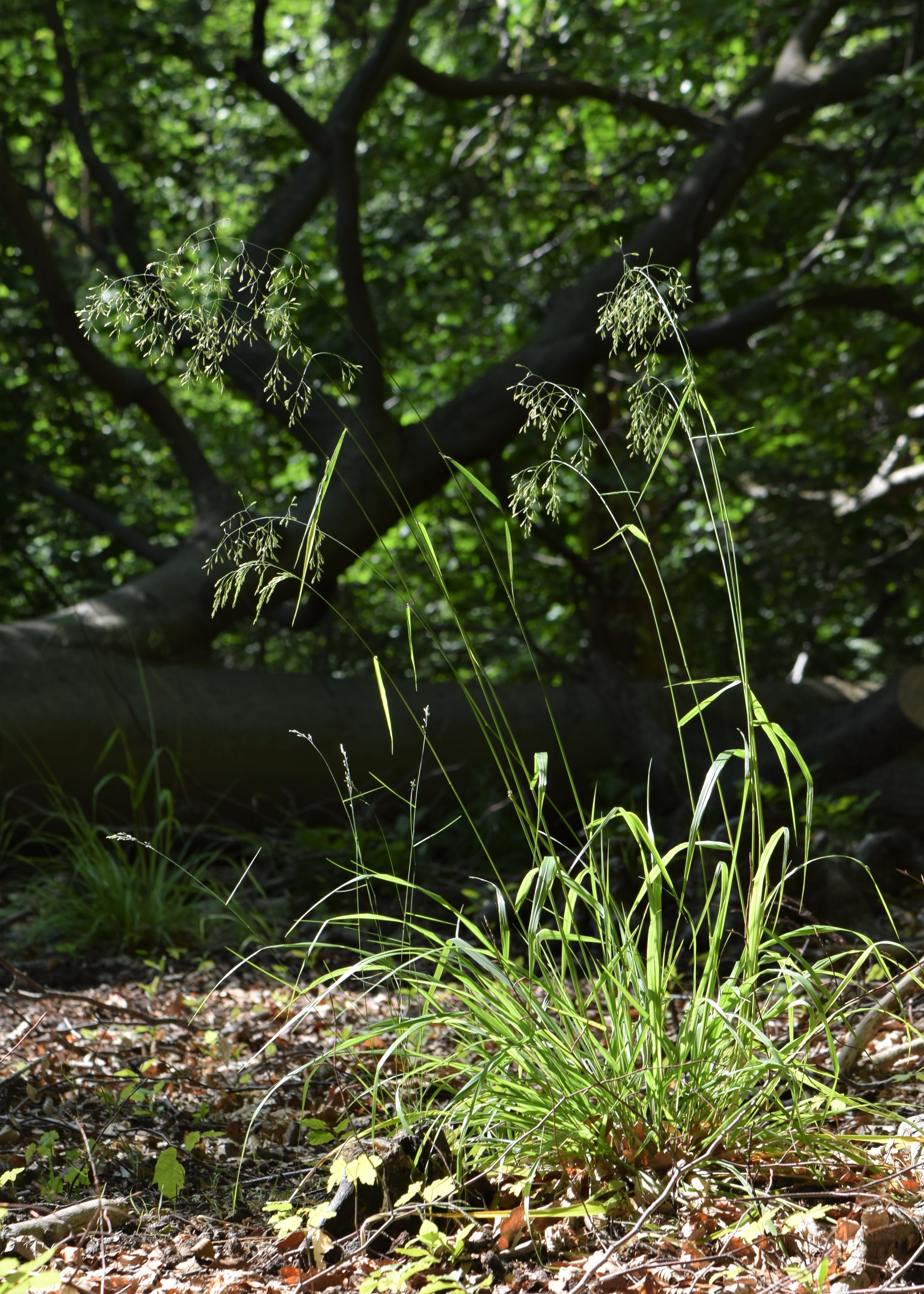
- Festuca altissima, found in Kolobrzeg, Northwestern Poland

Scientific classification
- Kingdom: Plantae
- Clade: Tracheophytes
- Clade: Angiosperms
- Clade: Monocots
- Clade: Commelinids
- Order: Poales
- Family: Poaceae
- Subfamily: Pooideae
- Genus: Festuca
- Species: F. altissima

Binomial name
- Festuca altissima All.

= Festuca altissima =

Species of grass

Festuca altissima, also known as the wood fescue, is a species of flowering plant belonging to the family Poaceae. It was first described in 1789.

Its native range is Europe to Siberia and Iran.
