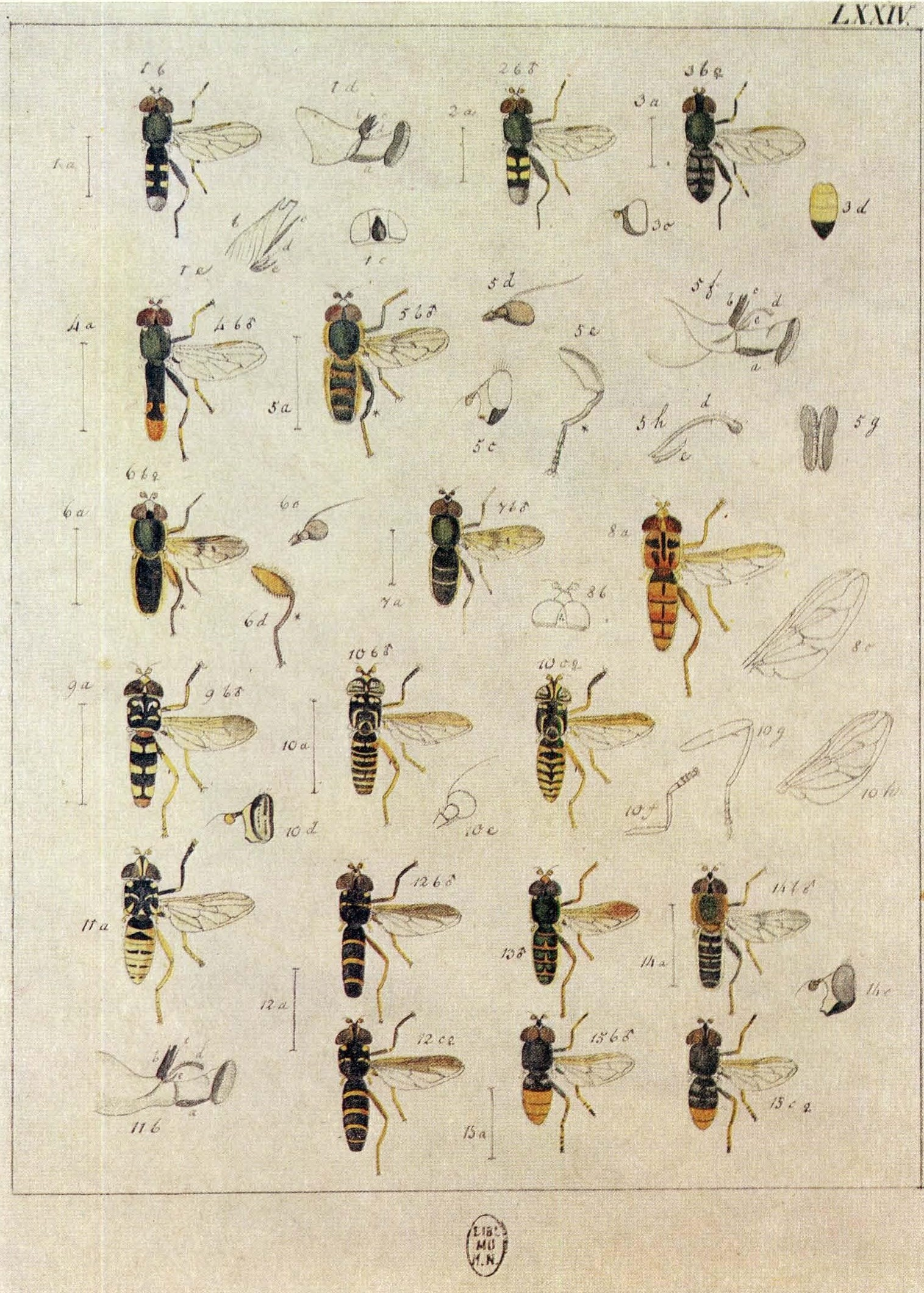
- Xylota abiens in Meigen Europäischen Zweiflügeligen (figure 3)

Scientific classification
- Kingdom: Animalia
- Phylum: Arthropoda
- Clade: Pancrustacea
- Class: Insecta
- Order: Diptera
- Family: Syrphidae
- Subfamily: Eristalinae
- Tribe: Milesiini
- Subtribe: Xylotina
- Genus: Xylota
- Species: X. abiens

Binomial name
- Xylota abiens Meigen, 1822

Synonyms
- Xylota semulater Harris, 1780; Zelima subabiens Stackelberg, 1952

= Xylota abiens =

Genus of flies

Xylota abiens is a European species of hoverfly.

== Description ==
External images For terms see Morphology of Diptera
The wing length is 6-8·25 mm. Abdomen black with yellow squarish spots. Thorax (dorsum) completely) pale haired and shining without bloom. Hind tibia darkened except at base. See references for determination.

== Distribution ==
Palearctic. Denmark South to the Pyrenees. Ireland East through Central Europe, northern Italy and Yugoslavia into Russia and the Caucasus and on as far as the Russian Far East and the Pacific coast.
