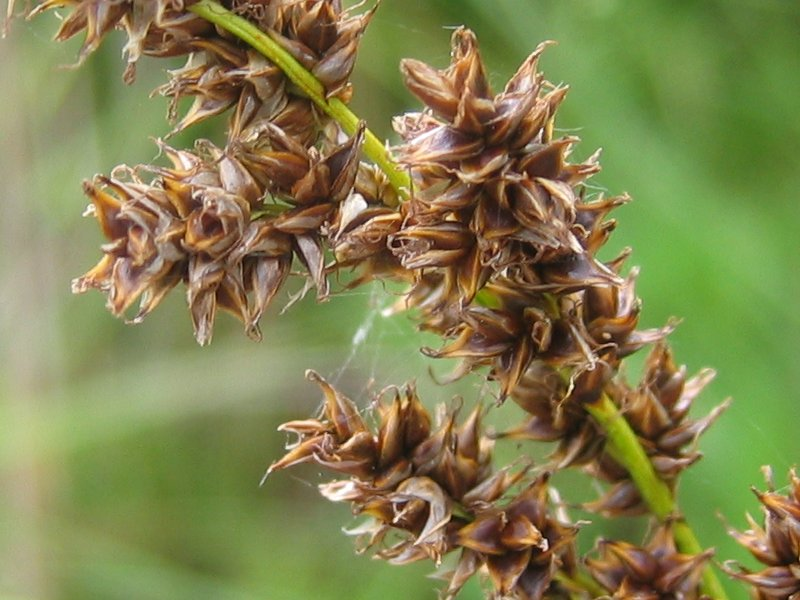

Conservation status
- Least Concern (IUCN 3.1)

Scientific classification
- Kingdom: Plantae
- Clade: Tracheophytes
- Clade: Angiosperms
- Clade: Monocots
- Clade: Commelinids
- Order: Poales
- Family: Cyperaceae
- Genus: Carex
- Species: C. paniculata

Binomial name
- Carex paniculata L.

= Carex paniculata =

Species of grass-like plant

Carex paniculata, the greater tussock-sedge, is a species of flowering plant in the sedge family, Cyperaceae. It grows 1.5 metres (4 ft 11 in) high and can be found in most of Europe (including Britain), Northwest Asia and North America.
