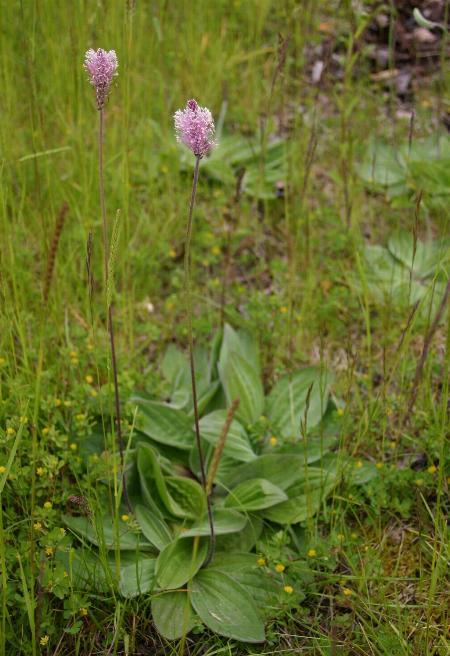

Conservation status
- Secure (NatureServe)

Scientific classification
- Kingdom: Plantae
- Clade: Tracheophytes
- Clade: Angiosperms
- Clade: Eudicots
- Clade: Asterids
- Order: Lamiales
- Family: Plantaginaceae
- Genus: Plantago
- Species: P. media

Binomial name
- Plantago media L.

= Plantago media =

Hoary plantain

Species of flowering plant in the plantain family

Plantago media, known as the hoary plantain, is a species of flowering plant in the plantain family Plantaginaceae. It is native to central and western Europe, including Great Britain and introduced to parts of the north-east United States. Its generic name is derived from the Latin for sole; like other members of the genus Plantago, it should not be confused with the unrelated plantain, a starchy banana.

== Description ==
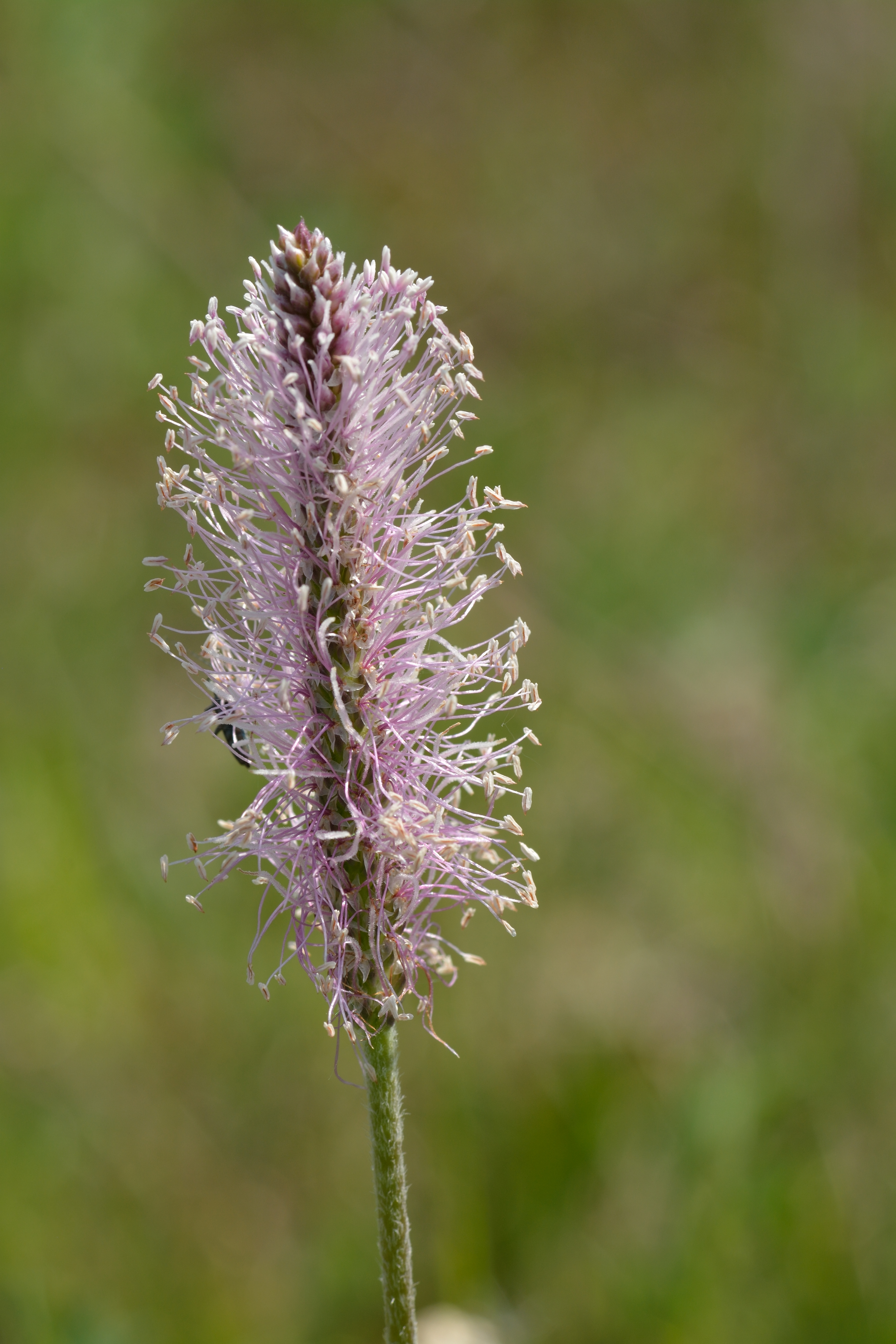
Inflorescence

Plantago media grows in damp grassy meadows up to an altitude of 2,000 m (6,600 ft). A slender stalk of between 5 and 50 cm (2 and 20 in) develops from a basal rosette of finely-haired leaves. Delicate pink-white flowers are borne between May and September. P. media is hermaphrodite and is pollinated by wind or insects, particularly bees.

== Distribution and habitat ==
Plantago media is native to Eurasia. It is native to eastern England, but scarce in Scotland and Ireland. It is calcicole, characteristic of soils on chalk or limestone, growing in grassland, meadows, lawns and waste places.

== Uses ==
The plant is edible. Archeological finds testify to its use during the Roman era in Britain.

100 g of fresh leaves provides 22.586 kcal from 3.33 g protein, 1.99 g net carbohydrates and 0.2 g fat. They are high in fiber with 2.25 g fiber per 100 g.
