= Boreal Sea =

Mesozoic-era seaway that lay along the northern border of Laurasia

The Boreal Sea was a Mesozoic-era seaway that lay along the northern border of Laurasia.
