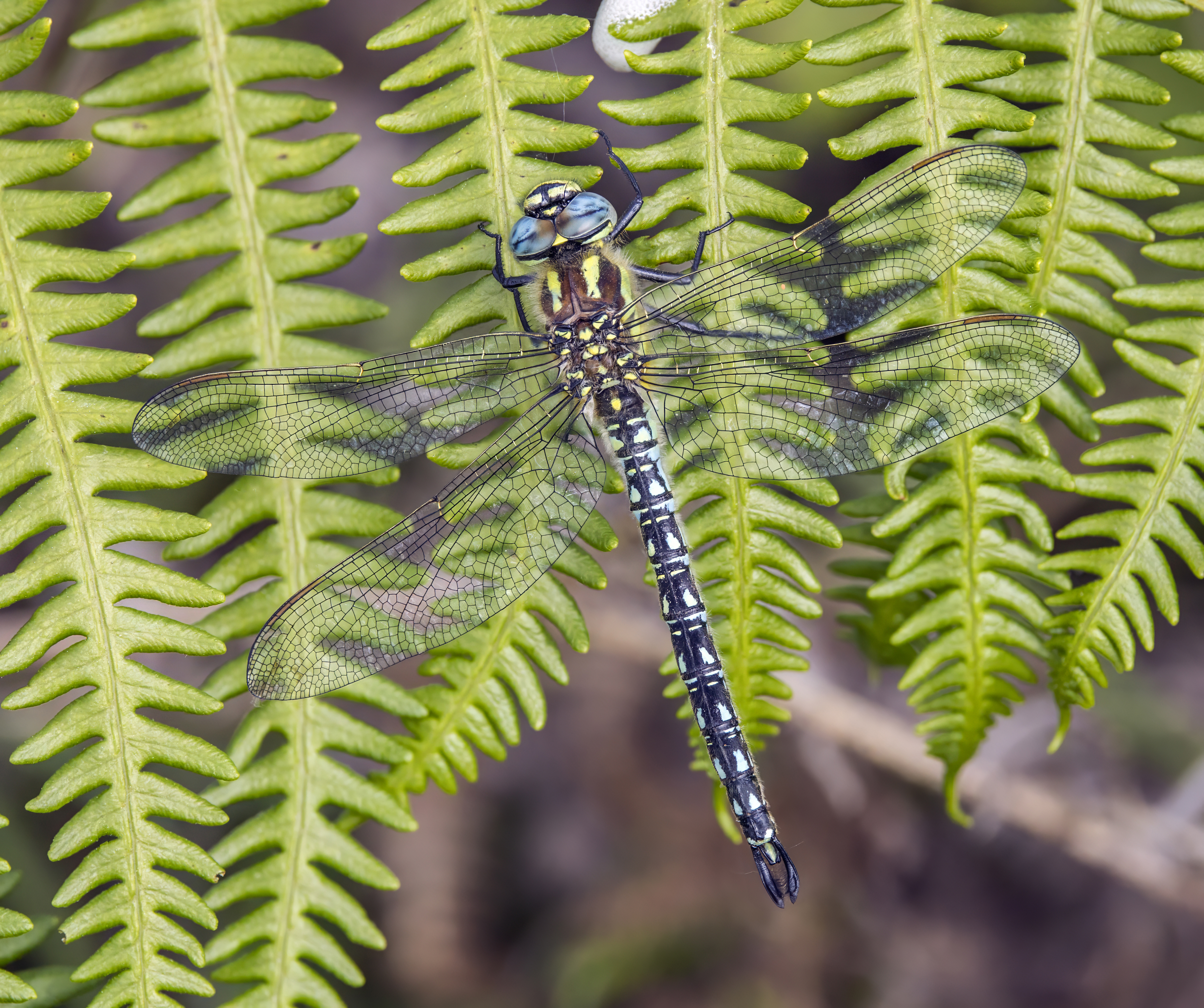
- Male, Ireland

Conservation status
- Least Concern (IUCN 3.1)

Scientific classification
- Kingdom: Animalia
- Phylum: Arthropoda
- Clade: Pancrustacea
- Class: Insecta
- Order: Odonata
- Infraorder: Anisoptera
- Family: Aeshnidae
- Genus: Brachytron; Evans, 1845
- Species: B. pratense

Binomial name
- Brachytron pratense (Müller, 1764)

= Hairy dragonfly =

Genus and species of dragonfly

Brachytron is a monotypic genus of European dragonfly of the family Aeshnidae containing the hairy dragonfly (Brachytron pratense), also known as the hairy hawker or spring hawker. It is found in Europe and Asia Minor, as far east as the Caspian Sea. With a typical length of around 5.5 centimetres (2.2 in) it resides close to water bodies containing plants and has a flight season running from May to July.

== Description ==
The hairy dragonfly is named for its hairy thorax, distinguishing it from other hawkers. It has a long, narrow pterostigma (the coloured, sclerotized patch on the outer region of each wing).

The antehumeral stripes are usually thin and green. The hairy dragonfly has coupled, oval-shaped markings on its abdomen, blue on males and yellow on females. It is smaller than other species in the genus Aeshna. It is the United Kingdom's smallest hawker.

== Habitat ==
The hairy dragonfly lives in ponds, lakes, fens, ditches, and canals rich in vegetation. Some plants that grow there include the common club rush, common reed, great fen sedge, and true bulrush. This dragonfly requires open and sunny areas with dense vegetation for protection. Here they are able to feed on flying insects, shelter, and grow sexually mature.

Although it is a common species, it is susceptible to uncongenial ditch management and poor water conditions. This is the reason the species disappeared for a few years, only to return recently. More so than its other relatives, the hairy dragonfly will only fly in sunshine and will hastily retreat if the sun happens to go in.

== Food and feeding habitats ==
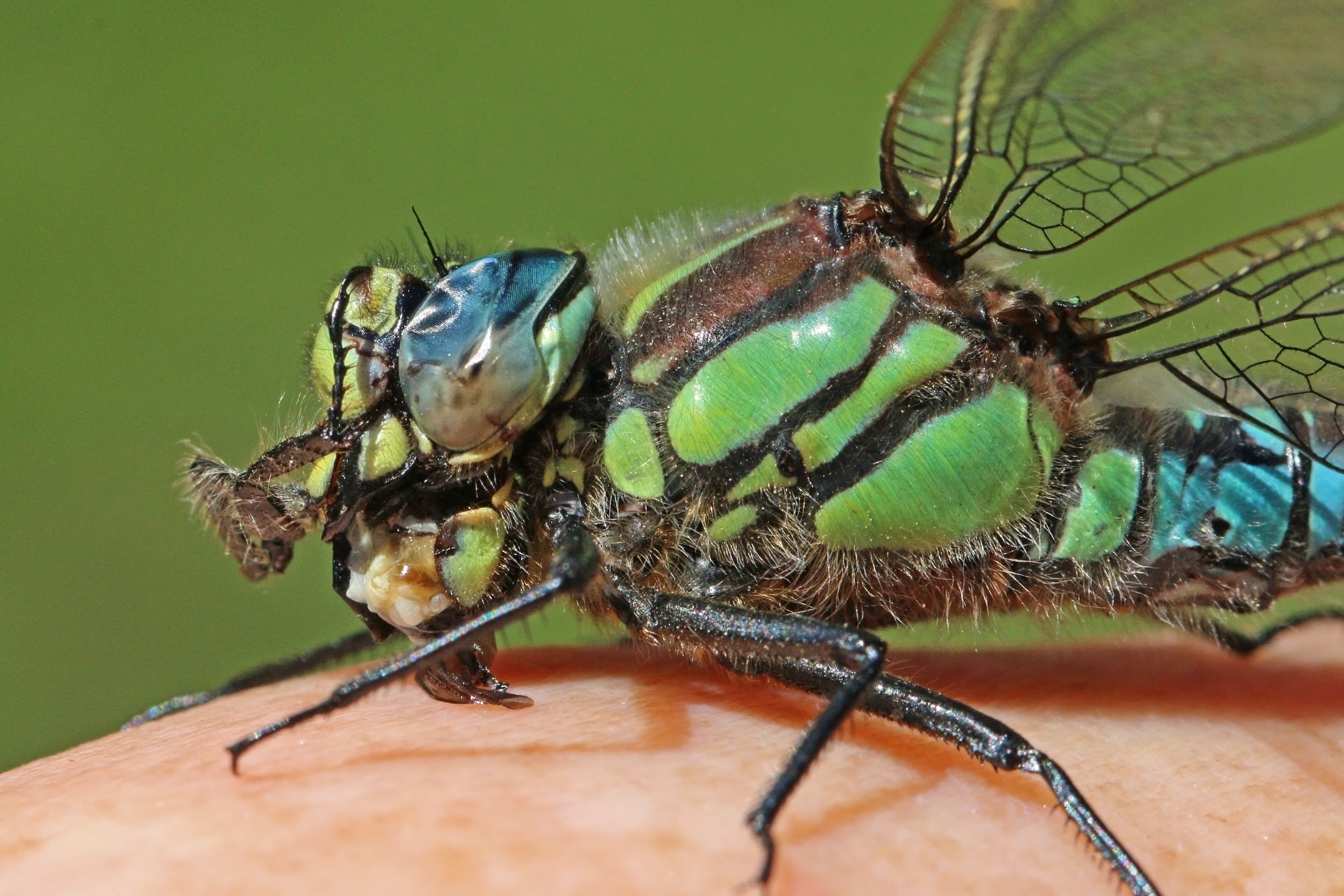
Male eating a bee in Estonia

Like typical hawkers, the hairy dragonfly preys in mid-air on flying insects. It then carries its food to a suitable perch where it is able to eat and digest.

== Life stages ==
The hairy dragonfly's flight period is short and early, beginning in mid-May and ending in mid-July. Dead vegetation and living stems growing in the water, close to the water's edge, provide a home for the eggs. Two years later, larvae emerge by scaling plant stems just above the surface of the water or possibly crawling inland for about a meter where they have room to spread their wings.

== Notes ==
- Hairy dragonfly. LWT (Lincolnshire Wildlife Trust). 25 Feb 2008
- Hairy dragonfly: Dumfries and Galloway Local Species Action Plan. 7 Mar. 2008. Dumfries and Galloway Council
