= Walter de Luci =

12th-century Anglo-Norman Abbot of Battle Abbey

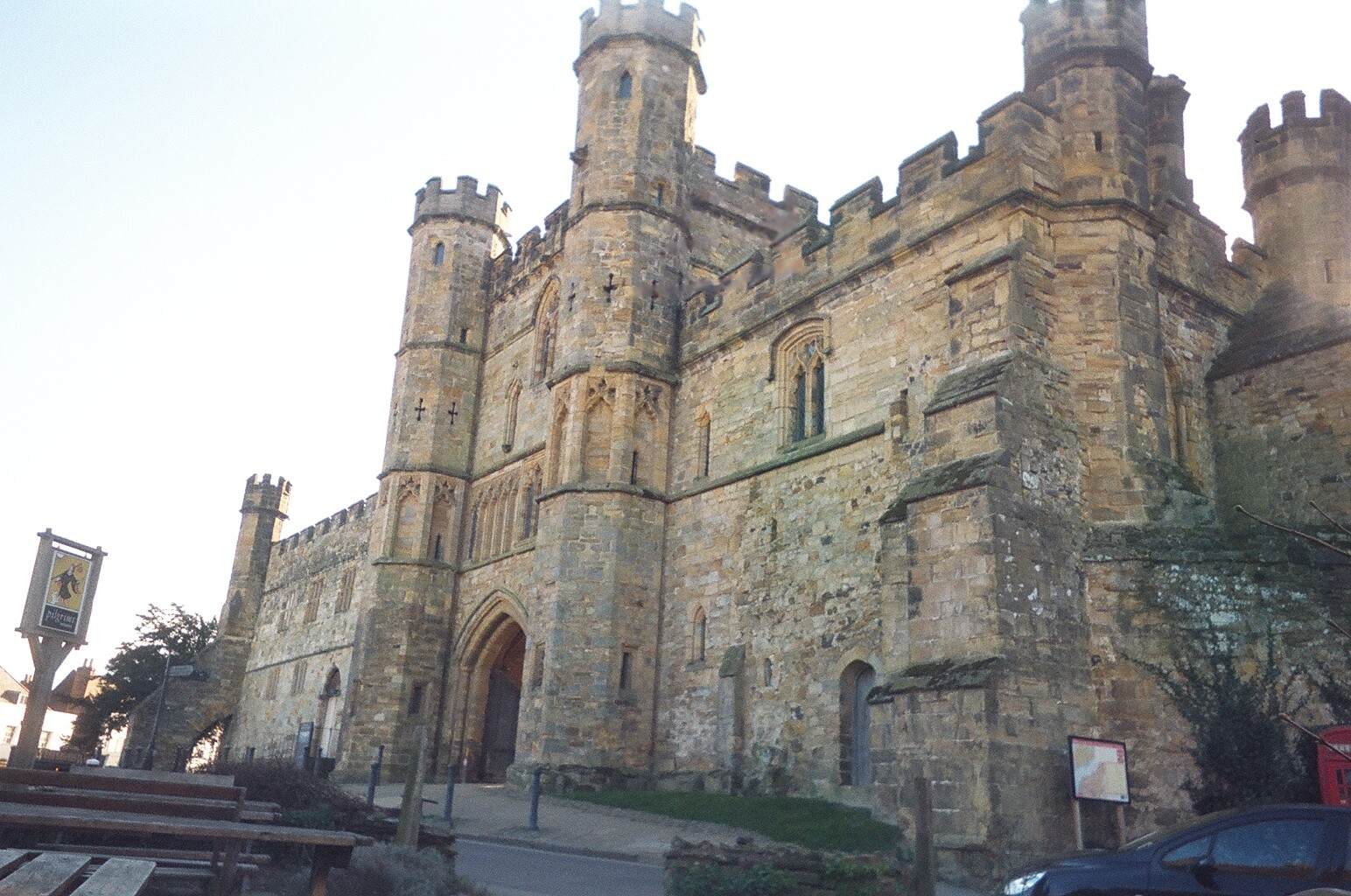
- Main Gate of Battle Abbey
- Title: Abbot of Battle

Personal life
- Born: 1103 (or 1091) Lucé, Normandy
- Died: 21 June 1171 Battle, East Sussex

Religious life
- Religion: Catholic

Senior posting
- Based in: England
- Period in office: 1139–1171
- Predecessor: Warner
- Successor: Odo

Walter de Luci (also Walter de Lucy), Abbot of Battle Abbey, was the brother of Richard de Luci, who was Chief Justiciar of England.

Walter de Luci (or de Lucy) was a Benedictine monk at Lonlay-l'Abbaye in Normandy, before being elected Abbot of Battle Abbey in Sussex, England. He was elected on 8 January 1139. He died while still abbot on 21 June 1171. While abbot, he became involved in a dispute with Hilary, bishop of Chichester, who was the bishop who held jurisdiction over Battle Abbey. Battle had never received a papal exemption, and instead relied on its status as a royal foundation by King William I of England and its status as an eigenkirche. Hilary obtained from both Pope Eugene III and Pope Hadrian IV orders to obey the bishop, but in 1157, Walter brought the case before King Henry II of England at a council held at Colchester. The foundation charter of William I and the confirmation by King Henry I of England, who was Henry II's grandfather, were produced by Walter, and were admitted as genuine. Both documents freed the abbey from ecclesiastical oversight, and Henry II had at his coronation confirmed all his grandfather's charters. However, Hilary argued that only a papal privilege could exempt a monastery from episcopal oversight, and that Battle had no such privilege. Henry was not impressed by this argument, for it impinged on his royal rights. Thomas Becket, then Henry's chancellor, was one of the main opponents of Hilary at this council.
