= Abbot of Battle =

List of medieval abbots of Battle Abbey in England

Abbot of Battle was the title given to the abbot of Battle Abbey in Sussex, England. The abbey was founded in 1067 by William the Conqueror and the first abbot was Robert Blanchard, who drowned soon after his appointment. The following table gives the abbots from the founding of the abbey until 1216, and is from Heads of Religious Houses: England and Wales 940–1216.

| Name | Dates | Notes |
|---|---|---|
| Robert Blanchard | 1067 | previously monk at Marmoutier Abbey |
| Gausbert | c. 1076–1095 | |
| Henry | 1096–1102 | previously monk of Bec Abbey and prior of Christ Church Priory |
| Ralph | 1107–1124 | previously monk at Bec, and at Caen, and prior of Rochester Cathedral Priory |
| Warner | 1125–1138 | previously monk at Canterbury resigned or was deposed retired to Lewes Priory |
| Walter de Luci | 1139–1171 | monk of Lonlé brother of Richard de Luci |
| Odo of Canterbury | 1175–1200 | previously prior of Canterbury |
| John de Duvra | 1200–before1215 | |
| Richard | 1215–1235 | previously monk of Battle Abbey |
