= Blackhorse Quarry =

Coordinates: 50.900°N 0.513°E

- Site of Special Scientific Interest
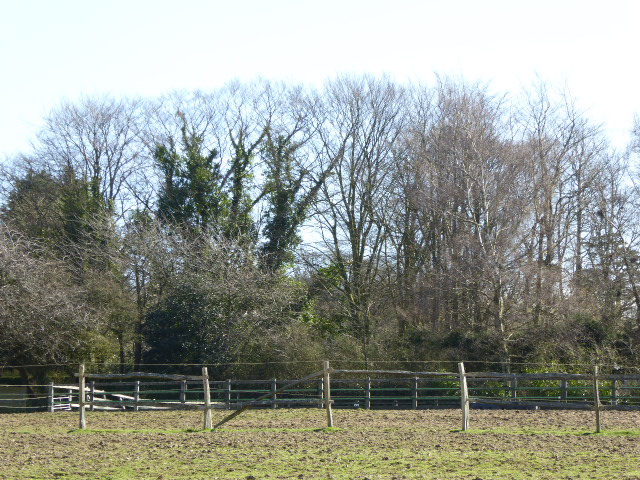
- View across fields towards Blackhorse Quarry
- Location of Blackhorse Quarry.
- Area of search: East Sussex
- Grid reference: TQ 768 142
- Interest: Geological
- Area: 0.2 hectares (0.49 acres)
- Notification date: 1989
- Location map: Magic Map

Blackhorse Quarry is a 0.2-hectare (0.49-acre) geological Site of Special Scientific Interest south-east of Battle in East Sussex. It is a Geological Conservation Review site.

This is the Type locality for the Wadhurst Clay Formation Telham Bond Bed, which dates to the Early Cretaceous and is part of the Wealden Group. It has yielded many fossils, including turtles, crocodiles, pterosaurs and dinosaurs.

The site is private land with no public access.
