= Battle of Hastings reenactment =

Battle reenactment

Coordinates: 50°54′45″N 0°29′14″E

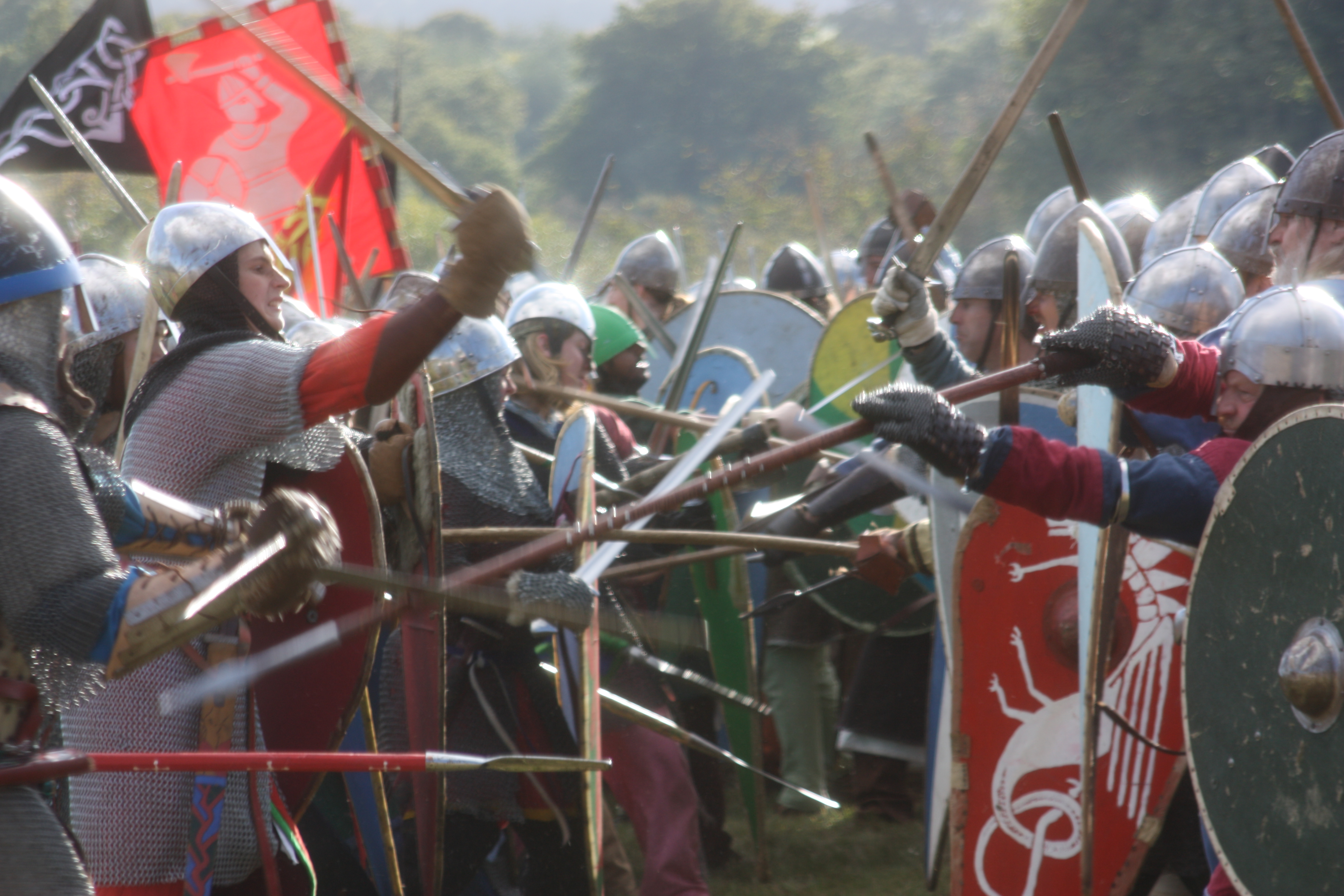
Battlefield photo

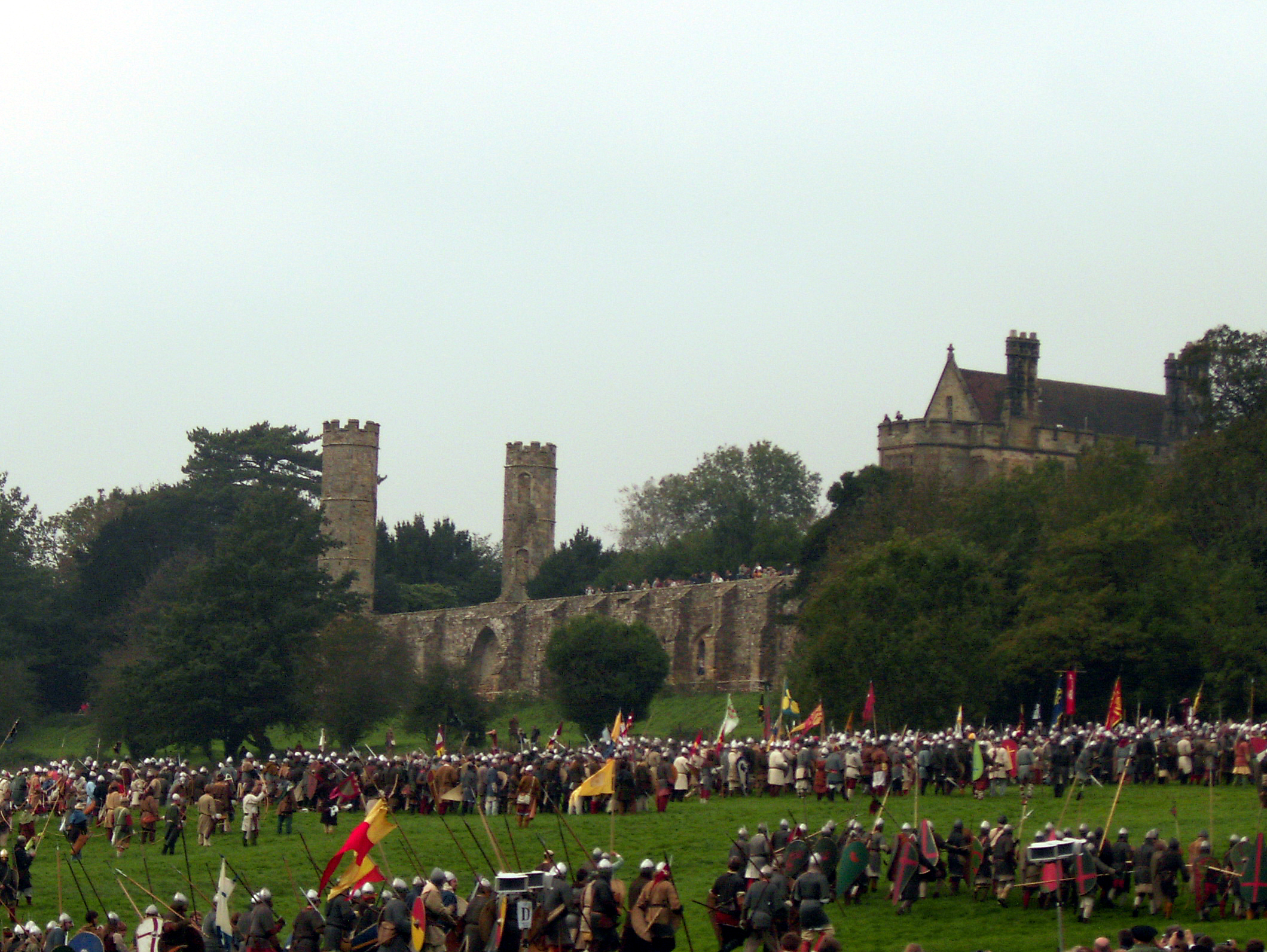
The lines drawn up in front of Battle Abbey

The Battle of Hastings reenactment is a yearly reenactment of the Battle of Hastings, held at Battle Abbey in Battle, East Sussex, UK, and drawing participants from around the world. It takes place every year on the weekend nearest 14 October on the site of the historical battle, although it is often arranged across the hill rather than up it, to take account of the smaller number of participants and the need for spectators.

The event is run by English Heritage, which owns the site, and attended by several thousand people yearly. For many years it was an event for amateur groups of reenactors, but more recently has involved scenes by professional actors.

Every five or six years since 1984 it has been the site of major reenactments. At the 2000 reenactment, called "Hastings 2000", about 1000 reenactors on foot, 100 cavalry and between 50 and 100 archers from 16 different countries took part.

The two-day Hastings 2006 event saw more than 3,000 re-enactors performing for a crowd of about 30,000 paying public. It was believed to have been the largest pre-gunpowder reenactment event ever held.
