= Hemingfold Meadow =

Protected area in East Sussex, England

Coordinates: 50.905°N 0.526°E

- Site of Special Scientific Interest
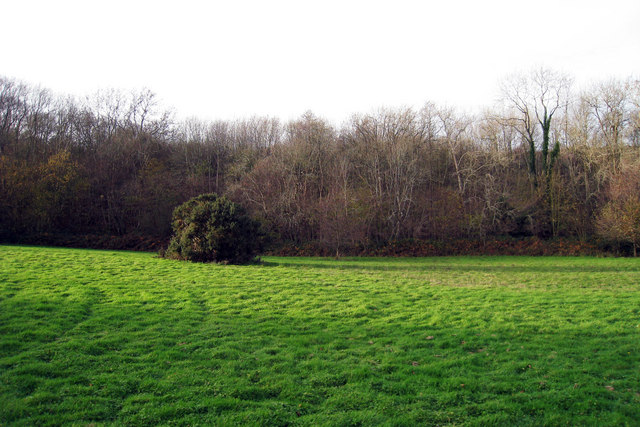
- Location of Hemingfold Meadow.
- Area of search: East Sussex
- Grid reference: TQ 777 148
- Interest: Biological
- Area: 4.9 hectares (12 acres)
- Notification date: 1984
- Location map: Magic Map

Hemingfold Meadow is a 4.9-hectare (12-acre) biological Site of Special Scientific Interest west of Battle in East Sussex.

This site consists of two adjacent meadows which have been managed with a grazing and mowing regime which maintains the flora. More than sixty species of flowering plant have been recorded, including common spotted orchid, ox-eye daisy, cuckoo flower, pignut, yellow rattle and primrose.
