= Leonard Newbery =

English cricketer

Personal information
- Full name: Arthur Leonard Newbery
- Born: 6 January 1905; Battle, Sussex, England
- Died: 17 December 1976 (aged 71); Ightham, Kent, England
- Batting: Right-handed

Domestic team information
- Years: Team
- 1925: Sussex

Career statistics
Competition	First-class
Matches	3
Runs scored	58
Batting average	11.60
100s/50s	0/1
Top score	50*
Catches/stumpings	0/–
- Source: Cricinfo, 9 January 2012

Arthur Leonard Newbery (6 January 1905 – 17 December 1976) was an English cricketer. Newbery was a right-handed batsman. He was born at Battle, Sussex.

Newbery made his first-class debut for Sussex against Cambridge University in 1925. He made two further first-class appearances for Sussex in that season, against Nottinghamshire and Worcestershire. In his three first-class matches, he scored a total of 58 runs at an average of 11.60, with a high score of 50 not out, which he made on debut against Cambridge University.

He died at Ightham, Kent on 17 December 1976.
