= Battle Abbey =

Benedictine abbey in Battle, East Sussex, England

Coordinates: 50°54′54″N 0°29′09″E

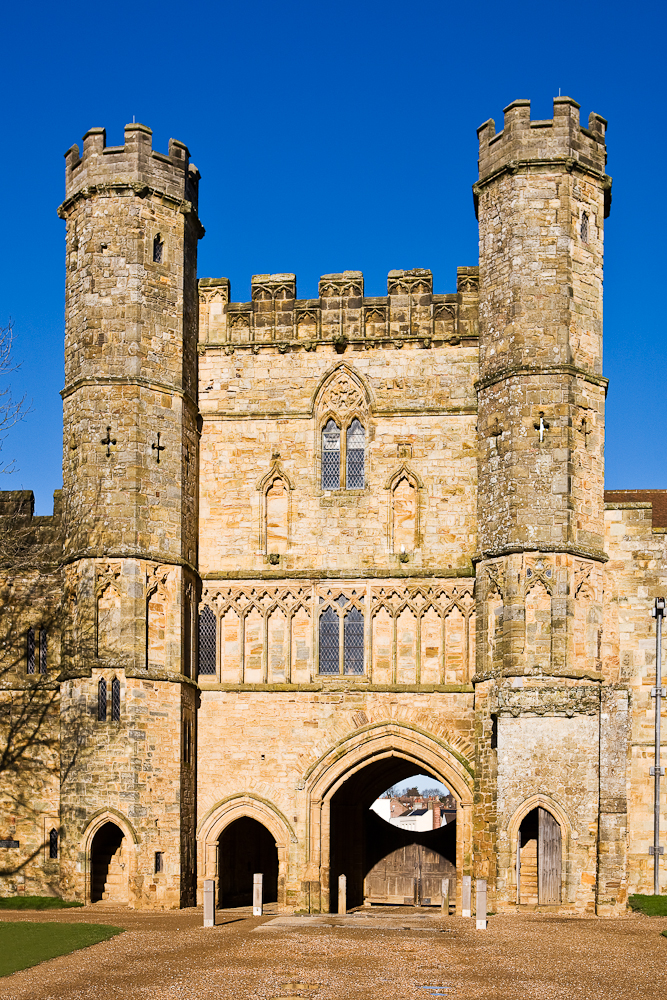
- Battle Abbey – Gate House

Monastery information
- Established: 1094
- Disestablished: 1538
- Dedication: St Martin of Tours
- Consecrated: 1094

People
- Founder: William I of England

Architecture
- Heritage designation: Scheduled monument
- Designated date: 11 July 1928

Site
- Location: Battle, East Sussex
- Country: England

Battle Abbey is a partially ruined Benedictine abbey in Battle, East Sussex, England. The abbey was built on the site of the Battle of Hastings and dedicated to St Martin of Tours. It is a Scheduled Monument.

The Grade I listed site is now operated by English Heritage as 1066 Battle of Hastings, Abbey and Battlefield, which includes the abbey buildings and ruins, a visitor centre with a film and exhibition about the battle, audio tours of the battlefield site, and the monks' gatehouse with recovered artefacts. The visitor centre includes a children's discovery room and a café, and there is an outdoor-themed playground.

== History ==
=== Foundation ===
William the Conqueror had vowed to build a monastery in the event that he won the battle. In 1070, Pope Alexander II ordered the Normans to do penance for killing so many people during their conquest of England. William vowed to build an abbey where the Battle of Hastings had taken place, with the high altar of the church on the supposed spot where King Harold fell in battle on Saturday, 14 October 1066.

William started building it but died before it was completed. The Vill survey of 1076 and early legal documents of adjoining property refer to a hospital or guesthouse which was attached to the gate of the abbey. The monastic buildings were about a mile in circuit and formed a large quadrangle, the high altar of the church being on the spot where Harold fell. The church was finished in about 1094 and consecrated during the reign of his son William II (commonly known as William Rufus). The king presented there his father's sword and coronation robes.

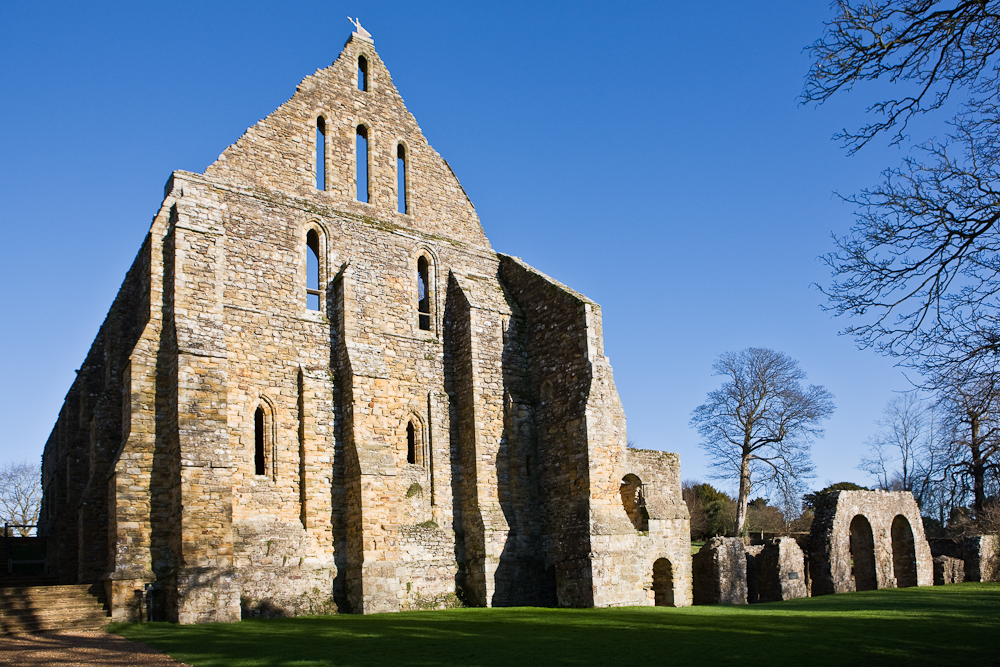
Battle Abbey – Dorter

The first monks were from the Benedictine Abbey of Marmoutier; the new foundation was dedicated to the Holy Trinity, St. Mary and St. Martin. It was designed for one hundred and forty monks, though there were never more than sixty in residence at one time.

William I had ruled that the church of St Martin of Battle was to be exempted from all episcopal jurisdiction, putting it on the level of Canterbury. The abbey was enriched by many privileges, including the right of sanctuary, of treasure trove, of free warren, and of inquest, and the inmates and tenants were exempt from all episcopal and secular jurisdiction. It was ruled by a mitred abbot who afterward had a seat in Parliament and who had the curious privilege of pardoning any criminal he might meet being led to execution.

Walter de Luci became abbot in 1139 and made several improvements. During the reign of Henry II of England, rival church authorities at Canterbury and Chichester unsuccessfully tested the charter. At the Abbey was kept the famous "Roll of Battle Abbey" which was a list of all those who accompanied William from Normandy. As time went on and the honour of descent from one of these Norman families was more highly thought of, unauthentic additions seem to have been made.

=== Suppression ===
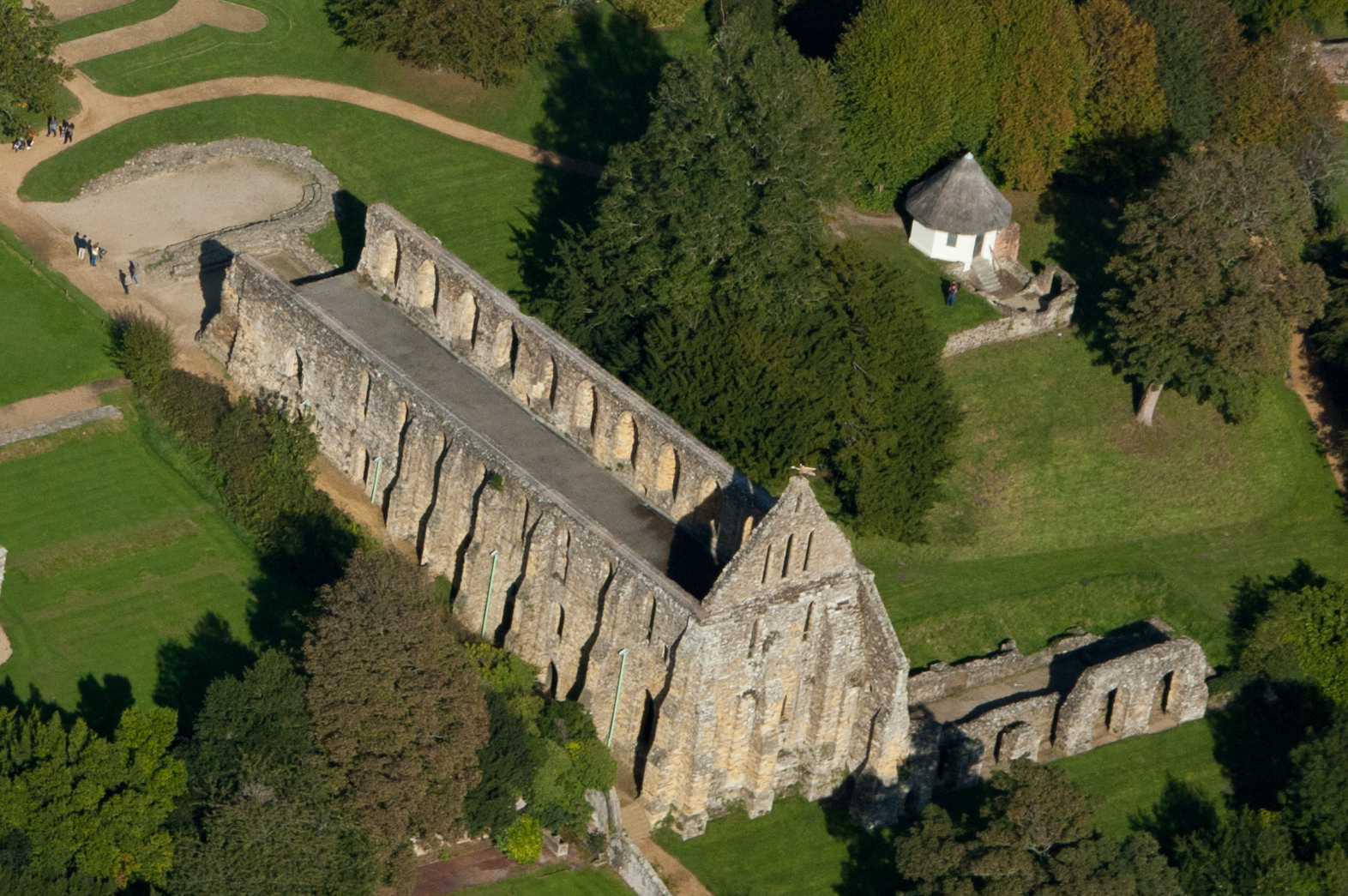
An aerial view of the dorter

The church was remodelled in the late 13th century, but virtually destroyed during the dissolution of the monasteries in 1538 under King Henry VIII. At the time of the suppression of the Abbey (May 1538), there were seventeen monks in residence. The displaced monks of Battle Abbey were provided with pensions, including the abbot John Hamond and the prior Richard Salesherst, as well as monks John Henfelde, William Ambrose, Henry Sinden, Thomas Bede and Thomas Levett, all bachelors in theology.

The abbey and much of its land was given by Henry VIII to his friend and Master of the Horse, Sir Anthony Browne, who demolished the church and parts of the cloister and turned the abbot's quarters into a country house.

A triple-light window in Buckland Church, Tasmania, depicting the life of St John and the crucifixion of Jesus, is claimed to have once adorned Battle Abbey. While legend suggests that it was removed and hidden during the Cromwell era to protect it from destruction before being transported to Tasmania, records confirm it was actually manufactured in London by artist Michael O'Connor around 1850 for the church.

=== Later history ===
The abbey was sold in 1721 by Browne's descendant, Anthony Browne, 6th Viscount Montagu, to Sir Thomas Webster, MP and baronet. Webster was succeeded by his son, Sir Whistler Webster, 2nd Baronet, who died childless in 1779, being succeeded in the baronetcy by his brother. Battle Abbey remained in the Webster family until 1857, when it was sold to Lord Harry Vane, later Duke of Cleveland. On the death of the Duchess of Cleveland in 1901, the estate was bought back by Sir Augustus Webster, 7th baronet.

Sir Augustus (son of Sir Augustus, 7th baronet) was born in 1864 and succeeded his father as 8th baronet in 1886. Sir Augustus was formerly a captain in the Coldstream Guards. With the death of the 8th baronet in 1923, the baronetage became extinct. The abbot's house was an all-girls boarding school; Canadian troops were stationed there during the Second World War.

=== Present day ===
In 1976, the Webster family trustees sold Battle Abbey to the British government (aided by a substantial contribution from American philanthropists); it is now in the care of English Heritage. In 2016, Historic England commissioned tree-ring analyses of oak timbers from the gatehouse, dorter and reredorter to help identify when these areas might have been built. Findings imply phased building and local timber acquisition, with samples indicating early- and later-fifteenth-century building work.

The church's high altar reportedly stood on the spot where Harold died. This is now marked by a plaque on the ground, and nearby is a monument to Harold erected by the people of Normandy in 1903. The ruins of the abbey, with the adjacent battlefield, are a popular tourist attraction, with events such as the Battle of Hastings reenactments.

All that is left of the abbey church itself today is its outline on the ground, but parts of some of the abbey's buildings are still standing: those built between the 13th and 16th centuries. These are still in use as the independent Battle Abbey School. Visitors to the abbey are usually not allowed inside the school buildings, although during the school's summer holidays, access to the abbot's hall is often allowed.

The church was used as the primary ground for the filming of band Black Sabbath's music video for "Headless Cross", the title track of the album of the same name released in 1989.

== Burials ==
- Harold Godwinson II

== Gallery ==
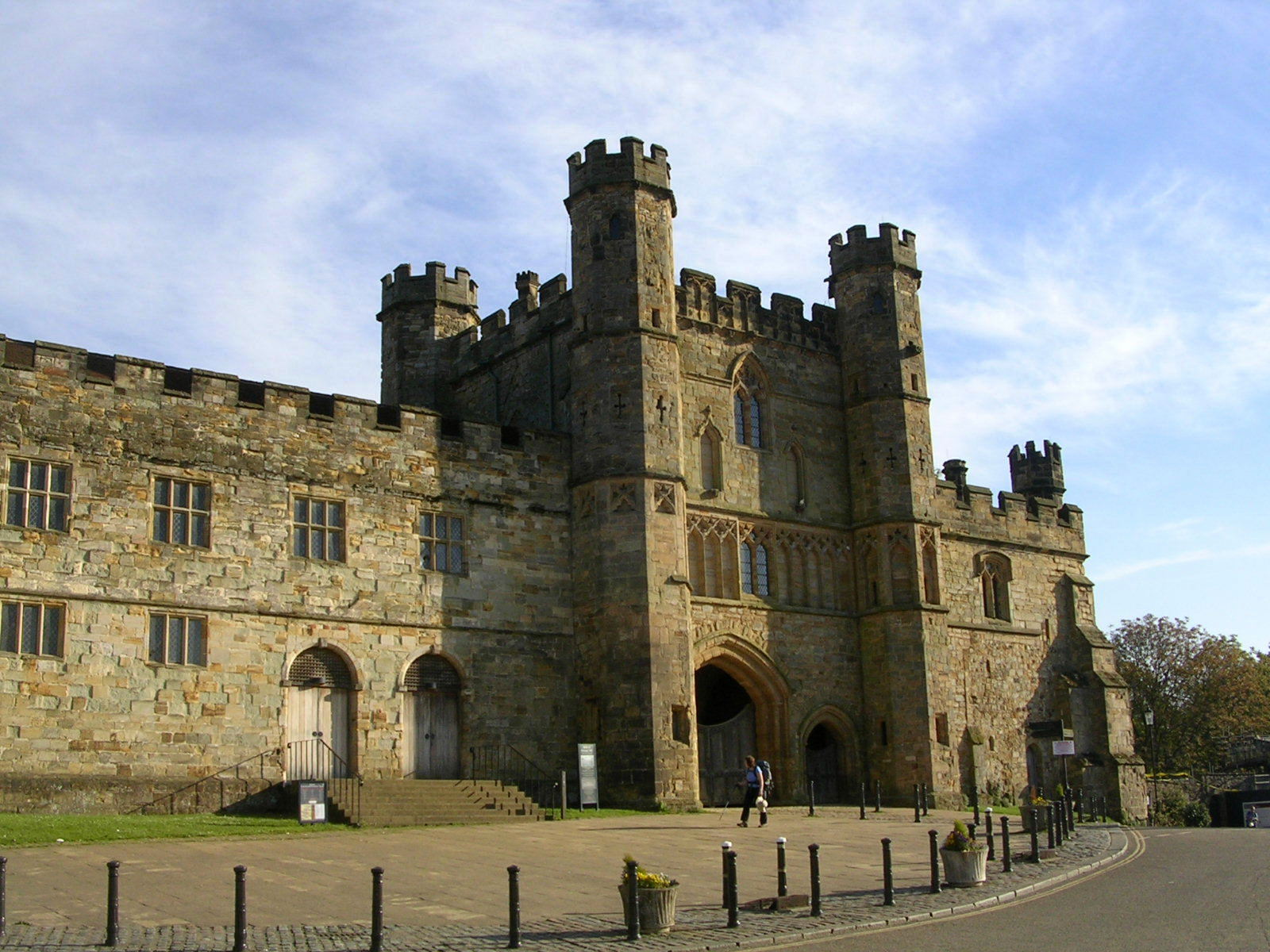
Battle Abbey

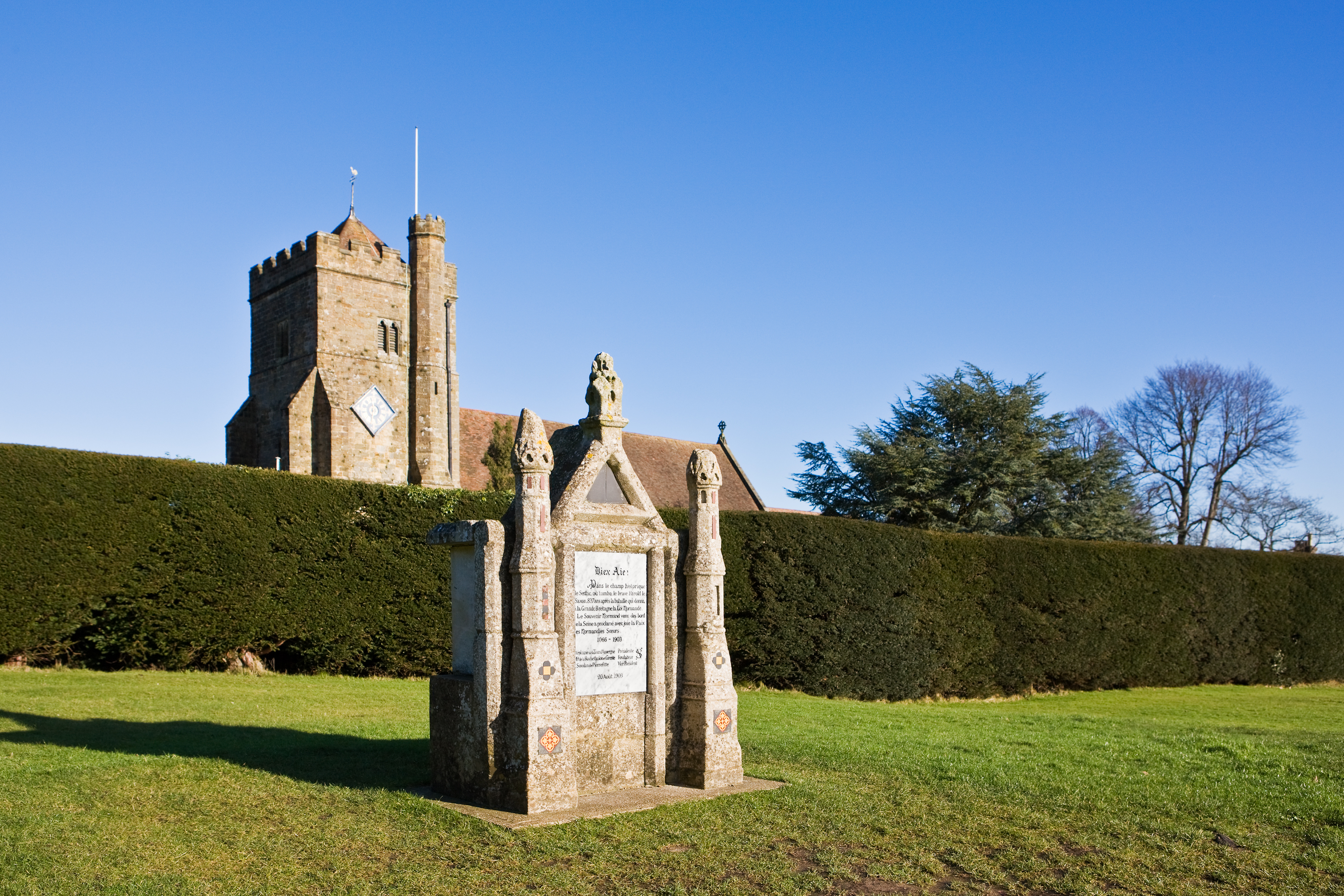
Monument to Harold

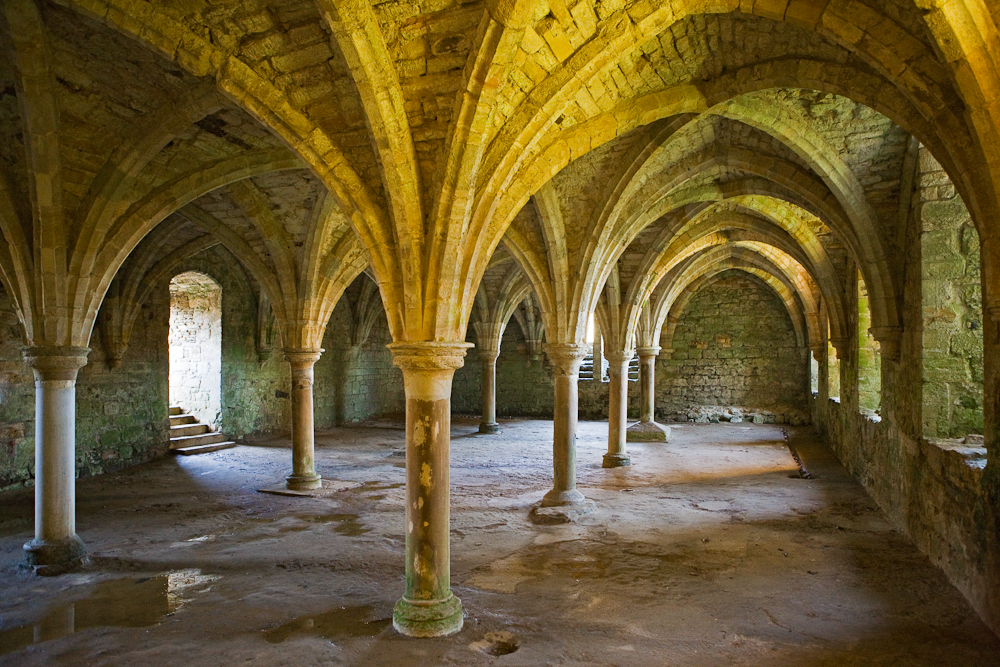
Battle Abbey – novices' common room

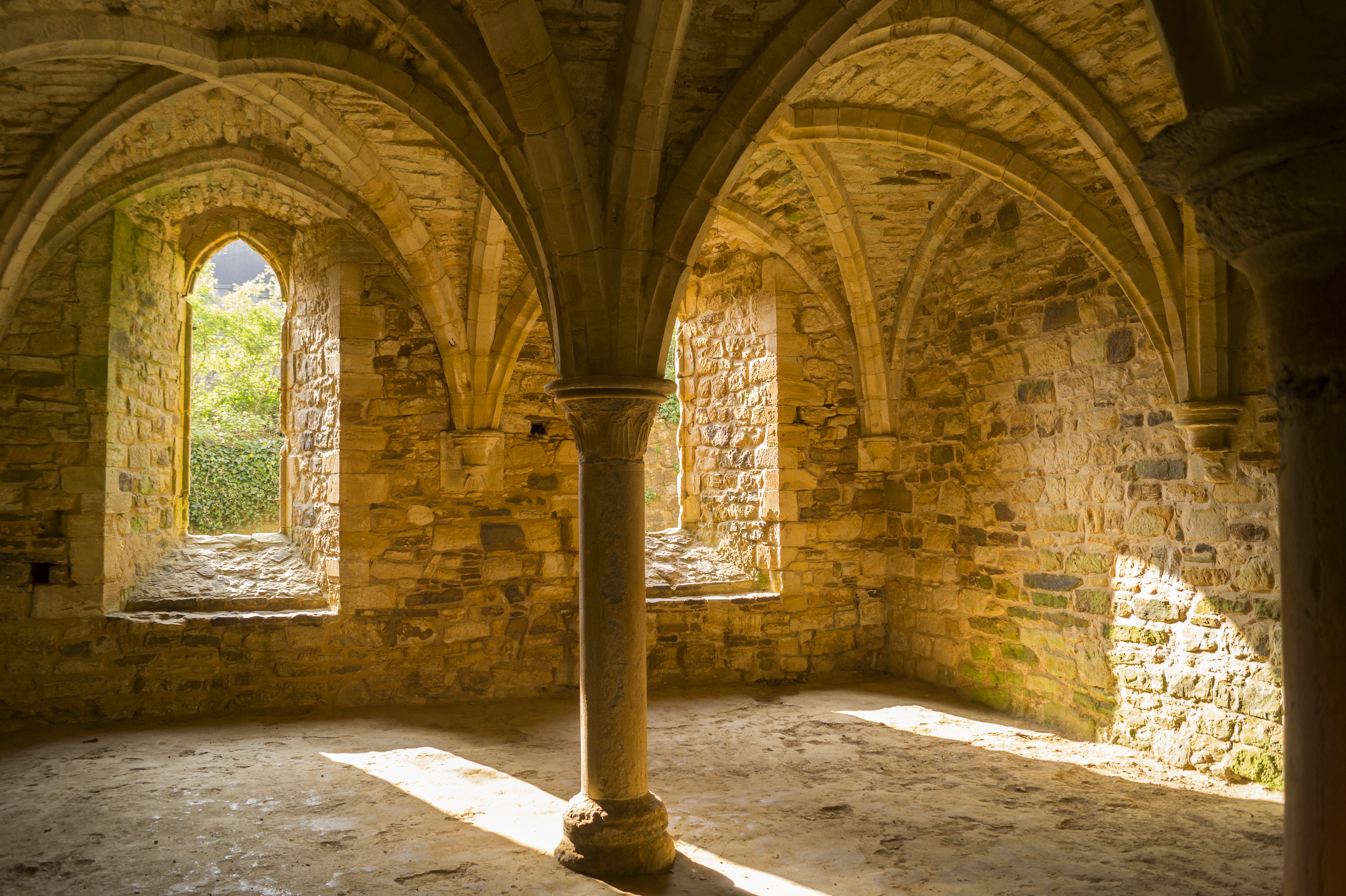
Novices' chamber

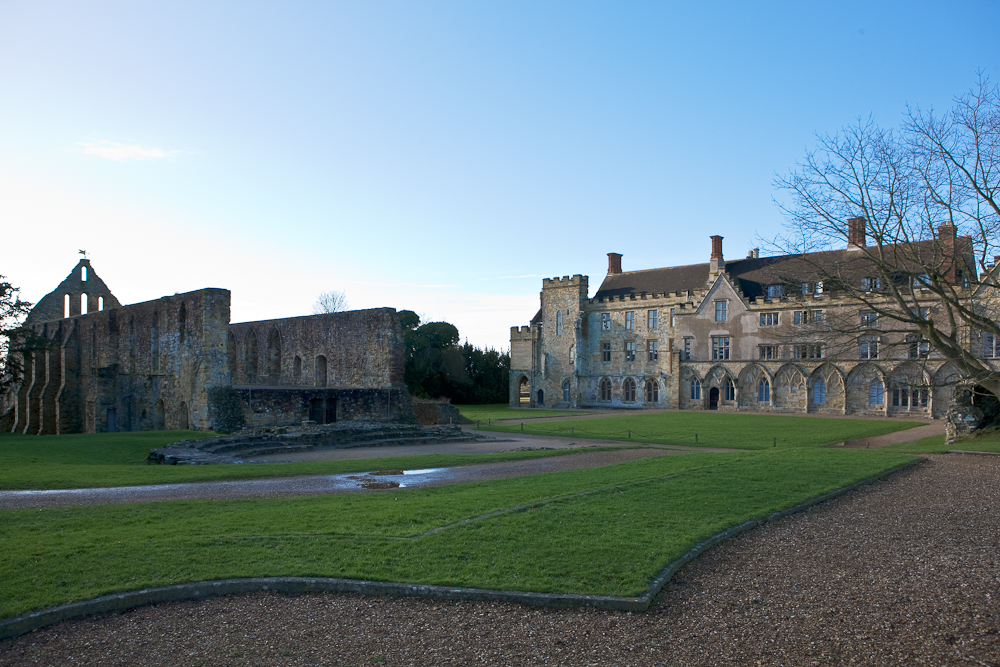
Battle Abbey – dorter, remains of cloister and Battle Abbey School

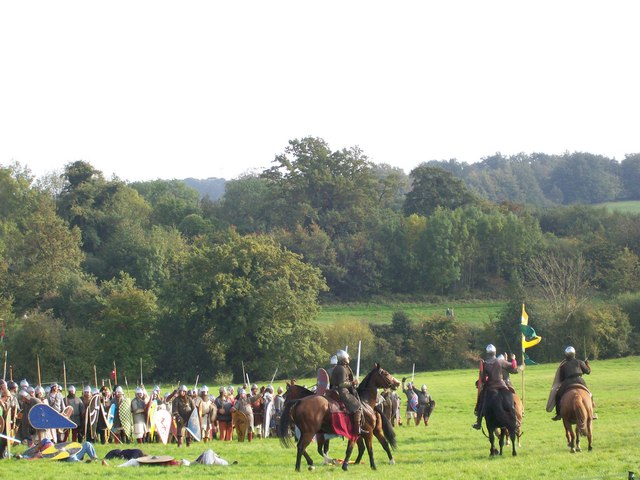
Battle Abbey reenactment

== See also ==
- Abbot of Battle, a list of abbots of Battle Abbey
- Battle Abbey Roll
- List of monastic houses in East Sussex
- Senlac Hill
- Odo of Canterbury
