= Mary Jean Stone =

English historical writer (1853–1908)

- Born: 1853; Brighton, Sussex, England
- Died: 3 May 1908 (aged 54–55); Battle, East Sussex, England
- Occupation: Writer
- Writing career
- Genre: Non-fiction

Mary Jean Stone (born at Brighton, Sussex, in 1853; died at Battle, Sussex, 3 May 1908) was an English historical writer.

== Life ==
She was educated in Paris and at Aschaffenburg in Germany, where she acquired a knowledge of French, German, and Italian. In Germany she became a Roman Catholic convert, and was received into the Catholic Church by Wilhelm Emmanuel von Ketteler, then Bishop of Mainz.

On her return to England, she was encouraged as a historian by Jesuit contacts.

== Works ==
- Faithful unto Death, a study of the martyrs of the Order of St. Francis during the Reformation period (1892);
- Eleanor Leslie, a memoir of a Scottish convert (1898);
- Mary the First, Queen of England (1901);
- Reformation and Renaissance (1904), studies;
- Studies from Court and Cloister, reprinted essays, including "Margaret Tudor", "Sir Henry Bedingfeld", and a "Missing Page from the Idylls of the King" (1905);
- The Church in English History, a textbook for teachers of history (1907).

Her Cardinal Pole, begun for the St. Nicholas Series, was interrupted by her death. She was a frequent contributor to periodicals including the Dublin Review, The Month, Blackwood's Magazine, and Cornhill Magazine, and contributed several articles to the Catholic Encyclopedia.
