= Reginald Lambert =

English cricketer

Personal information
- Full name: Reginald Everitt Lambert
- Born: 25 September 1882; Battle, Sussex, England
- Died: 23 January 1968 (aged 85); Shaftesbury, Dorset, England
- Batting: Unknown
- Bowling: Right-arm medium

Domestic team information
- Years: Team
- 1904: Marylebone Cricket Club
- 1904: Sussex
- 1903–1904: Cambridge University

Career statistics
Competition	First-class
Matches	4
Runs scored	72
Batting average	12.00
100s/50s	0/0
Top score	30
Balls bowled	312
Wickets	3
Bowling average	54.66
5 wickets in innings	0
10 wickets in match	0
Best bowling	3/53
Catches/stumpings	1/–
- Source: Cricinfo, 18 March 2012

Reginald Everitt Lambert (25 September 1882 – 23 January 1968) was an English cricketer. Lambert's batting style is unknown, though it is known he bowled right-arm medium pace. He was born at Talham Court, Battle, Sussex, and was educated at Harrow School.

While studying at the University of Cambridge, Lambert made two first-class appearances for Cambridge University Cricket Club, one in 1903 against Yorkshire and another against Worcestershire in 1904. Lambert made two further first-class appearances in 1904 for different teams, making an appearance for Sussex against Cambridge University at Hove, and for the Marylebone Cricket Club against London County Cricket Club at Crystal Palace. In his four first-class matches, he scored a total of 72 runs at an average of 12.00, with a high score of 30. With the ball, he took 3 wickets at a bowling average of 54.66, with best figures of 3/53.

He died at Shaftesbury, Dorset, on 23 January 1968.
