= Odo of Canterbury =

12th-century English abbot and saint

Saint Odo of Canterbury

Abbot
- Died: 20 January 1200
- Venerated in: Roman Catholic Church

Odo of Canterbury (died 1200), also known as Odo Cantianus or Odo of Kent, was a theologian and abbot of Battle.

Odo was a monk of Christ Church, who later became a sub-prior. He was sent by his friend Thomas Becket in 1163 to attend an appeal with Pope Alexander III against the Archbishop of York, stemming from the tensions between Becket and King Henry II.

In 1173 a great fire broke out at Christ Church. After the church burned down, Odo went to the Council of Woodstock on 1 July 1175, to renew the charters of the church. Instead, he was elected abbot of Battle on 19 July 1175.

Odo was known as an ardent lover of books, and a great theologian who preached in French, English, and Latin. There is some uncertainty as to his writings, owing to confusion with Odo of Cheriton and Odo of Murimund, but a list of thirteen works, chiefly writings on the Old Testament and sermons, can be ascribed to him.

The origin of the expression "To Jesus through Mary" is generally attributed to Louis Grignion de Montfort. However, the idea of going through Mary to Jesus is much older, and was promoted by such authors as Ildephonse of Toledo († 667), Germanus of Constantinople († 773), John of Damascus († 750), et al. In Odo of Canterbury († 1200) is found a passage which is even closer to the expression attributed to Montfort. Odo says: "... one goes to Christ through Mary, one goes to the Son through the Mother. By means of the Mother of Mercy one reaches mercy itself." (Testi Mariani, ed. L. Gambero, vol. 3, 490)

Odo died on 20 January 1200 and was buried in the lower part of the church at Battle. He was venerated at Battle as a saint. The relic list at Canterbury Cathedral mentions "a tooth of the Ven. Odo Abb. Of Battle".
