= Battle, East Sussex =

Town in England

Coordinates: 50.92°N 0.48°E

Battle
- High Street

- Location within East Sussex
- Area: 31.8 km^{2} (12.3 sq mi)
- Population: 6,800 (2021)
  - Density: 503/sq mi (194/km^{2})
- OS grid reference: TQ747160
  - London: 48 miles (77 km) NNW
- District: Rother
- Shire county: East Sussex
- Region: South East
- Country: England
- Sovereign state: United Kingdom
- Post town: BATTLE
- Postcode district: TN33
- Dialling code: 01424
- Police: Sussex
- Fire: East Sussex
- Ambulance: South East Coast
- UK Parliament: Bexhill and Battle
- Website: Town Council

Battle is a town and civil parish in the district of Rother in East Sussex, England. It lies 50 miles (80 km) south-east of London, 27 miles (43 km) east of Brighton and 20 miles (32 km) east of Lewes. Hastings is to the south-east and Bexhill-on-Sea to the south. Battle is in the designated High Weald National Landscape. The parish population 6,800 in the 2021 census, an increase from the 2011 Census figure of 6,673.

Battle contains the site of, and is named after, the Battle of Hastings, where William, Duke of Normandy, defeated King Harold II to become William I of England in 1066. For some 250 years after 1066, official documents referred to the town as (Latin) Bellum or (French) Bataille.

== History ==
Prior to 1066, the area had been relatively empty and unpopulated. The nearest settlement was probably located in today's Netherfield ward, within a large, wealthy, ancient hundred called Hailesaltede.

The town of Battle grew around an abbey, which was constructed on the orders of King William to commemorate the battle and atone for the resulting slaughter; a settlement probably already existed outside the abbey gates by 1110. The Abbey provided sufficient trade to survive in an otherwise improbable location for a new town and there remain some fine examples of Medieval domestic architecture, for example the Wealden-style hall-houses in Upper Lake, Pilgrim's Rest and others in the High Street.

Battle was most likely the birthplace of two pre-eminent stonemasons of the late 13th and early 14th Centuries. John of Battle worked at Vale Royal Abbey and was then chosen by Edward I to supervise construction of some of the Eleanor Crosses, whilst Thomas of Battle was involved with construction at Caerphilly Castle, the Tower of London and Battle Hall.

Most of the area was heavily wooded and provided oak and other timbers for navy shipyards, power for making cannons (shipped to Portsmouth or Chatham), cannonballs and gunpowder. It later developed a reputation for the quality of the gunpowder produced in the area. The first recorded gunpowder mill in Battle was built in 1676 when John Hammond was granted permission to build a mill on land owned by the abbey. A gunpowder works was located in Powdermill Lane, the remains of which have been converted into a hotel. In 1722, Daniel Defoe described the town as being "remarkable for little now, but for making the finest gun-powder, and the best perhaps in Europe". The Duke of Cleveland refused to renew the licence in 1874 after many mishaps, including one occasion in 1798 when more than 15 tons of gunpowder were left in the oven for too long and exploded.

In the past, the town was celebrated for the skill and innovation of its clock and watch makers. This included the development of the first ever electric clock.

Battle was the birthplace in 1799 of Eliza Acton, author of the pioneering Modern Cookery for Private Families (1845). This sold well for the rest of the 19th century. Its lists of ingredients, cooking times and other innovations provided a model for the cookery section of the best-selling Mrs Beeton's Book of Household Management (1861).

'Battel Bonfire Boyes' is claimed to be the oldest of the Sussex Bonfire Societies and to have the oldest effigy (a 'head') of Guy Fawkes, now in Battle Museum.

Battle mostly escaped the conflict during World War 2. Some bombs and incendiary devices did fall in the area, most notably on 2 February 1943 when three bombs were dropped on the town. Two of these failed to explode, but one did detonate, destroying two shops and killing two residents. Close to the parish church are examples of 'dragons' teeth', Second World war, concrete, anti-tank obstacles, constructed to hinder the progress of any enemy invasion forces.

== Governance ==
Battle is governed at the lowest level by Battle Town Council, consisting of (when a full complement) 13 elected councillors who meet on the third Tuesday of each month. The council is responsible for street lighting, allotments, cemeteries and recreational areas. It provides a local voice to the district and county councils. It is split into four wards: Marley, Netherfield, Telham and Watch Oak.

Rother District council provides the next level of government, the bulk of which matches the Bexhill and Battle Parliamentary constituency. The council provides services such as refuse collection, planning consent, leisure amenities, council tax collection and economic development. Since the 2019 local elections, Rother has been run by a coalition of Independent, Liberal Democrat, Labour and Green councillors. Battle is divided into two wards and includes the neighbouring village of Whatlington. The North Battle, Netherfield and Whatlington ward returns two councillors (currently one Liberal Democrat and one Green) and the South Battle and Telham ward returns one (currently a Liberal Democrat).

East Sussex County Council is the third tier of government, providing education, children's services, highways maintenance, refuse disposal, libraries and public health services. Following recent by-elections ESCC is under 'No Overall Control'. Battle forms the major part of the Battle and Crowhurst Division which ever since 1992 has returned a Liberal Democrat as its County Councillor.

Battle falls within the Bexhill and Battle UK Parliament constituency. It has traditionally returned Conservative MPs to Westminster. The MP from 2015 to 2024 has been Huw Merriman (Conservative) who was Minister of State for Rail and HS2. After Merriman stood down Conservative Kieran Mullan was elected.

Prior to Brexit in 2020, Battle was part of the South East England constituency in the European Parliament.

== Landmarks ==
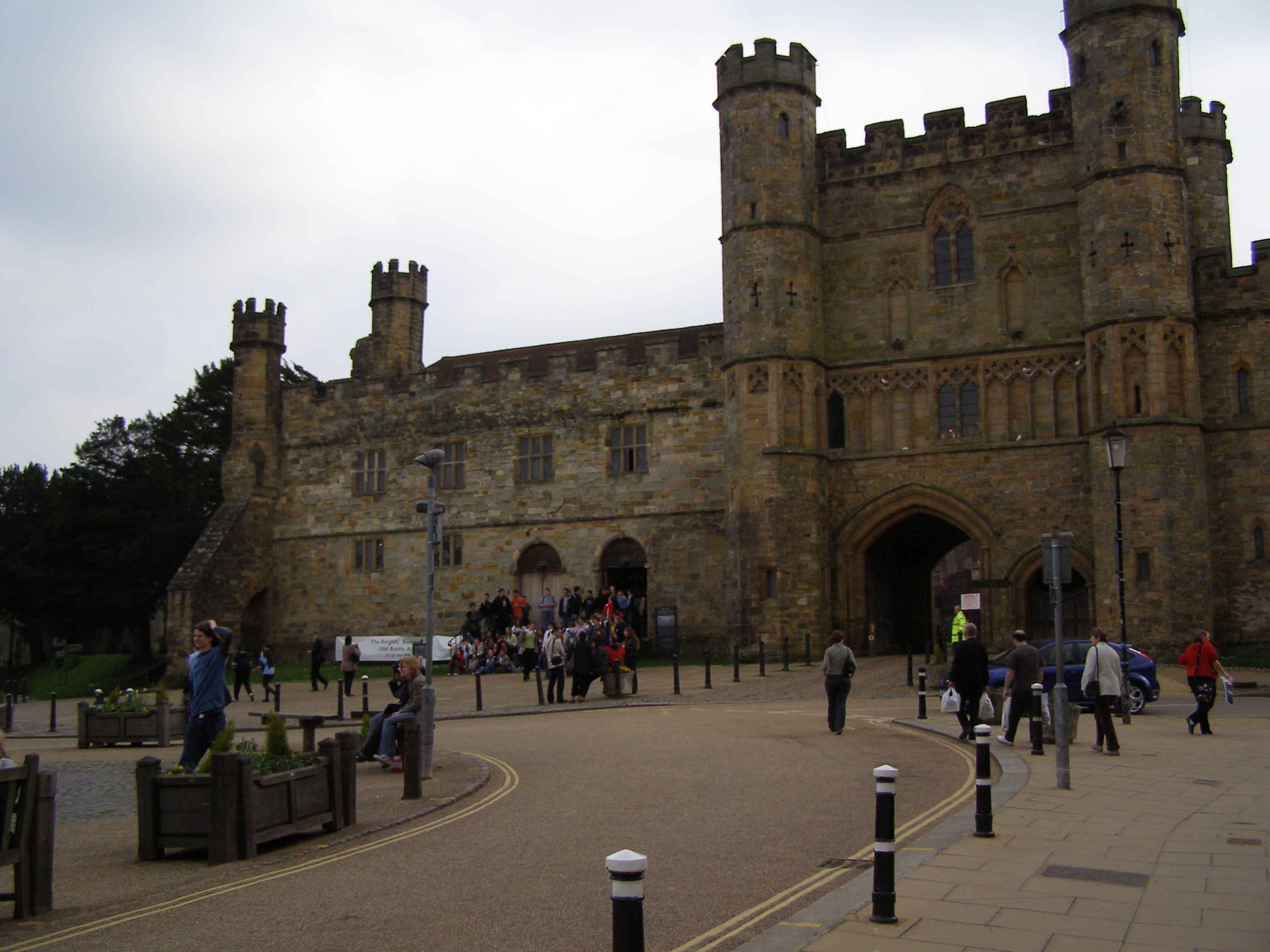
Gatehouse of Battle Abbey

Telham Hill is 1.0 mile (1.6 km) south-east of Senlac Hill, and it was from Telham Hill that William the Conqueror first caught sight of the English army forming up on Senlac Hill, for the Battle of Hastings, 14 October 1066. In the late 19th century it was owned and farmed by Samuel Carter as part of his Quarry Hill estate. At the top of the hill is a mound of uncertain date and purpose.

The Abbey is known as Battle Abbey, and was dedicated to St Martin, sometimes known as the "Apostle of the Gauls". The abbey was founded to commemorate the battle, and dedicated in 1095. Construction was initiated by a small group of monks from Marmoutier, France. The high altar of the abbey church was reputedly sited on the spot where Harold died. The gateway is the dominant feature of the south end of the main street, although much of the rest of the abbey buildings have been demolished or adapted for domestic living. The remaining cloisters, part of the west range, were leased to Battle Abbey School shortly after World War I, and the school remains in occupancy.

Opposite the Abbey is the church of St Mary the Virgin, consecrated in 1115 and enlarged since. It contains the notable alabaster tomb of the first occupant of the abbey after the dissolution of the monasteries under Henry VIII: Sir Antony Browne and his wife. The church also contains early 14th Century wall paintings, fine monuments and brasses. The church contains the 'Senlac window', a stained glass window depicting the Battle of Hastings and completed in 1984. It also exhibits the 3.2m long Battle Tapestry, modelled on the Bayeux Tapestry and depicting how the town might have developed from 1066 to the consecration of the church in 1115. It was produced by 741 individual 'stitchers' and completed in 2017.

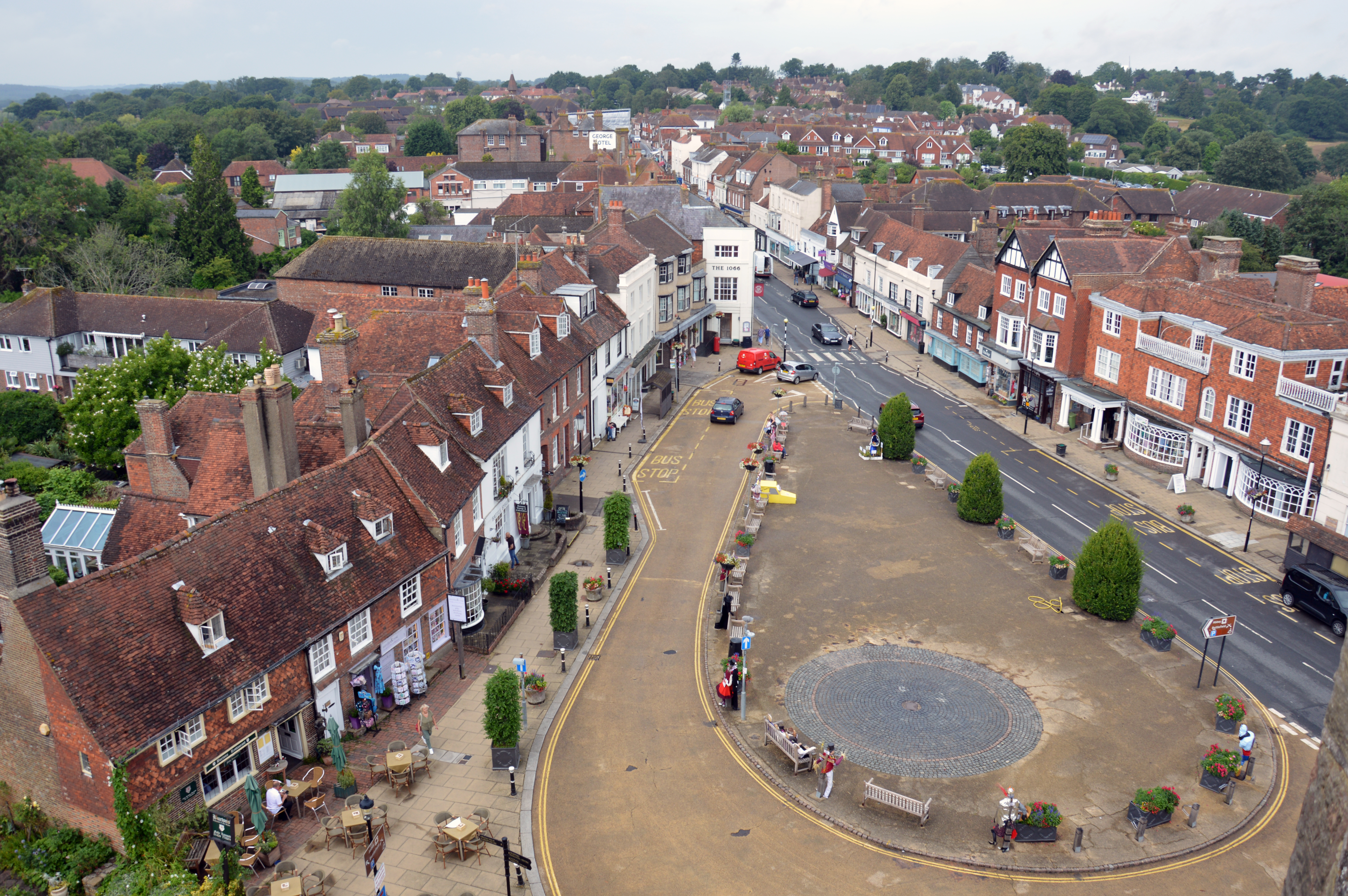
View of the Battle Abbey Green and the town's High Street from the Gatehouse of Battle Abbey.

Battle is famed for its old-fashioned High Street, with many shops and restaurants on either side.

There are three Sites of Special Scientific Interest within the parish:

- Blackhorse Quarry, a site of palaeontological interest which has produced many fossil bones and teeth, including those of Iguanodon and crocodiles.
- Hemingfold Meadow is a site of biological interest consisting of two meadows with nationally rare grassland species.
- Darwell Wood, another site of biological importance as an example of hornbeam coppice with oak standards is partially within the parish.

== Tourism ==
Tourism in Battle is centered on the town's association with the Battle of Hastings. Battle forms part of 1066 Country, the destination brand used to promote the eastern part of East Sussex. Its 2024–27 business plan identifies Battle as one of the area's principal settlements and describes Battle Abbey and battlefield as a major heritage attraction and a central part of the destination's historical identity.

The abbey and battlefield are managed as a visitor attraction by English Heritage. The site includes the battlefield, abbey ruins, medieval gatehouse, a visitor center and exhibitions. English Heritage also stages a Battle of Hastings re-enactment at the site, involving Norman and Saxon living-history displays and a recreation of the battle.

Other visitor attractions include the Battle Museum of Local History, beside the Almonry, whose displays cover the local area from prehistoric and Roman finds to the town's industrial and modern history. The museum and the adjoining Almonry gardens are free to enter.

Battle lies on the 31-mile 1066 Country Walk, which runs from Pevensey Castle through Battle and Winchelsea to Rye. On the outskirts of the town, Battle Great Wood is managed by Forestry England for recreation and provides woodland access for walking and horse riding.

== Transport ==
Battle is linked to Hastings and London by the A2100 and A21.

Battle railway station lies on the Hastings Line, north of Crowhurst and south of Robertsbridge. It is managed by, and the services are provided by, Southeastern. It was designed by William Tess and is a fine example of Victorian Gothic revival architecture; it has been listed as Grade 2 by Historic England.

There was once a station called Mountfield Halt between Battle and Robertsbridge, but this closed on 6 October 1969.

== Popular culture ==
The immediate area was home to notable twentieth-century authors, including Sheila Kaye-Smith and Elizabeth Jane Howard, and is featured in their books. In the first half of the last century Marriott Edgar (who came to live and to die at Battle) was well known for his witty verses, particularly in association with Stanley Holloway. In Anthony Burgess' novel Earthly Powers, Battle is the hometown of its main character, Kenneth Toomey, where Toomey's father has a dental surgery.

Battle is referenced in songs by the alternative rock band Keane, as several of the members grew up in the town. In the song "Sovereign Light Cafe" from the album Strangeland, Powdermill Lane and the battlegrounds are mentioned. "Snowed Under" names Manser's Shaw; "Somewhere Only We Know" does not mention it, but is widely believed to refer to it too.

British and Irish Lion Granville Coghlan was born in Battle and later became a schoolmaster.

== Notable people ==
- Eliza Acton (1799–1859), poet and food writer, wrote Modern Cookery for Private Families
- Cecil W Bacon (1905–1992), artist
- Veronica Beechey (1946–2021), feminist and sociologist
- Barbara Bodichon (1827–1891), artist, feminist, and educationalist, co-founded Girton College
- Moya Bowler (born 1940), shoe designer
- Samuel Carter (1805–1878), railway solicitor and politician
- Frank Chacksfield (1914–1995), conductor and composer
- Tom Chaplin (born 1979), lead singer of Keane
- Thomas Clyde (1917–1999), film producer
- Tom Dakin (born 1943), cross-country skier
- Bertram Dobell (1842–1914), bookseller, publisher, and poet
- William Frankland (1912–2020), allergist and immunologist
- Binnie Hale (1899–1984), actress, singer and dancer
- William Hammond (1719–1783), hymnist
- Mark Judge (1847–1927), architect
- Reginald Lambert (1882–1968), cricketer
- W.A. Lamborn (1877–1959), physician and medical entomologist
- Leonard Newbery (1905–1976), cricketer
- Herbert Arnould Olivier (1861–1952), artist
- Thomas Pilchard (1557–1587), priest, one of the Eighty-five martyrs of England and Wales
- Tim Rice-Oxley (born 1976), keyboardist and backing vocalist of Keane
- Francis Ronalds (1788–1873), scientist, engineer and inventor
- Steven Scott (born 1985), shooter, Olympic bronze medallist
- Mary Jean Stone (1853–1908), historical writer and biographer

== Twin towns ==
Battle is twinned with:

Saint-Valery-sur-Somme, Somme, France.

== See also ==
- List of places of worship in Rother
