= Veronica Beechey =

British writer, psychotherapist, researcher, and activist (1946–2021)

- Born: 1946; Hastings, Sussex, England
- Died: 14 January 2021 (aged 74–75)

Academic work
- Discipline: Sociology
- Sub-discipline: Social class, Marxism, Economics, Women's studies
- Institutions: Open University

Veronica Beechey (1946–14 January 2021) was a British feminist sociologist and patient's rights advocate.

== Early life and education ==
Beechey was born in Hastings and grew up in Battle, Sussex. She attended Ashford School for Girls and Hastings College. She studied sociology at Essex University, achieving a first in her degree, before going to Oxford to complete a doctorate.

== Academic career ==
After teaching in America, in 1973, Beechey became lecturer in Sociology at Warwick University, before being recruited by the Open University in 1983 to initiate a women's studies course.

In their article 'Woman and the Reserve Army of Labour: A Critique of Veronica Beechey', Floya Anthias raised questions around Beechey's 1977 article 'Some Notes on Female Wage Labour', while also recognising that it was "the most sophisticated and influential attempt to analyse women's wage labour by using or reconstituting the categories of Marx's Capital".

Beechey's book, Unequal Work, published with Verso in 1987, was influential in feminist and women's studies. The book contains nine essays explaining "Beechey's proposals for a more flexible and equitable vision of employment for both women and men in the future". Unequal Work is recommended as further reading in the 'Women at Work' chapter to the Macmillan Introducing Women's Studies Feminist Theory and Practice handbook, 1993, and is extracted in the Women's Studies Essential Readings handbook also in 1993.

Beechey co-wrote the book A Matter of Hours with Tessa Perkins. The book looked at rise of part time work in postwar Britain, and how there was a gender disparity in who was offered part time work. The book was considered a significant contribution to labour market analysis.

== Patient advocacy ==
In the 1980s, Beechey was diagnosed with acute myalgic encephalomyelitis, or chronic fatigue syndrome, which led her in 1990 to retire from the OU. As a patient at the University College London hospital, between 2005 and 2019 she served three terms as patient governor, taking on the role of the hospital council's first lead governor in this time.

She founded - and chaired for six years - a High Quality Patient Care Group to represent the needs of patients to the board of directors at the hospital.

During her illness, she published articles with OpenDemocracy critiquing the ways in which she saw "the needs of bureaucracy or even business" over patients, and discussing how "politicians and advisors on the one hand and the public and NHS staff" have divergent ideas about what is best for the NHS.

== Selected publications ==
=== Books ===
- Unequal work (London: Verso, 1987).
- A Matter of Hours: Women, Part-time Work and the Labour Market, co-written with Tessa Perkins, 1987.

=== Articles ===
- 'Some Notes on Female Wage Labour', Capital and Class No. 3 (1977)
- 'On Patriarchy', Feminist Review, 3, 66–82 (1979) https://doi.org/10.1057/fr.1979.21
