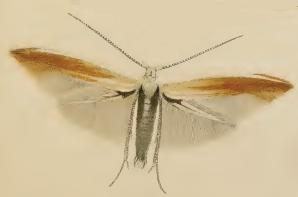

Scientific classification
- Kingdom: Animalia
- Phylum: Arthropoda
- Class: Insecta
- Order: Lepidoptera
- Family: Coleophoridae
- Genus: Coleophora
- Species: C. colutella

Binomial name
- Coleophora colutella (Fabricius, 1794)

Synonyms
- Tinea colutella Fabricius, 1794; Coleophora crocinella Tengstrom, 1848; Coleophora serenella Duponchel, 1843; Membrania stanoiuii Nemes, 2004

= Coleophora colutella =

Species of moth

Coleophora colutella is a moth of the family Coleophoridae. It is found in all of Europe, except Great Britain and Ireland. It is an introduced species in North America.

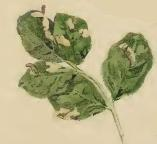
Piece of leaf of Astragalus glycyphyllos, with larval mines and cases attached

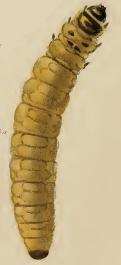
Larva

The wingspan is 12–14 mm (0.47–0.55 in).

The larvae feed on Anthyllis, Astragalus danicus, Astragalus glycyphyllos, Colutea arborescens, Coronilla emerus, Coronilla emerus emeroides, Coronilla vaginalis, Coronilla varia, Cytisus, Genista, Hippocrepis comosa, Laburnum, Lotus corniculatus, Lotus uliginosus, Oxytropis, Tetragonolobus maritimus and Vicia species. Larvae can be found from autumn to May.
