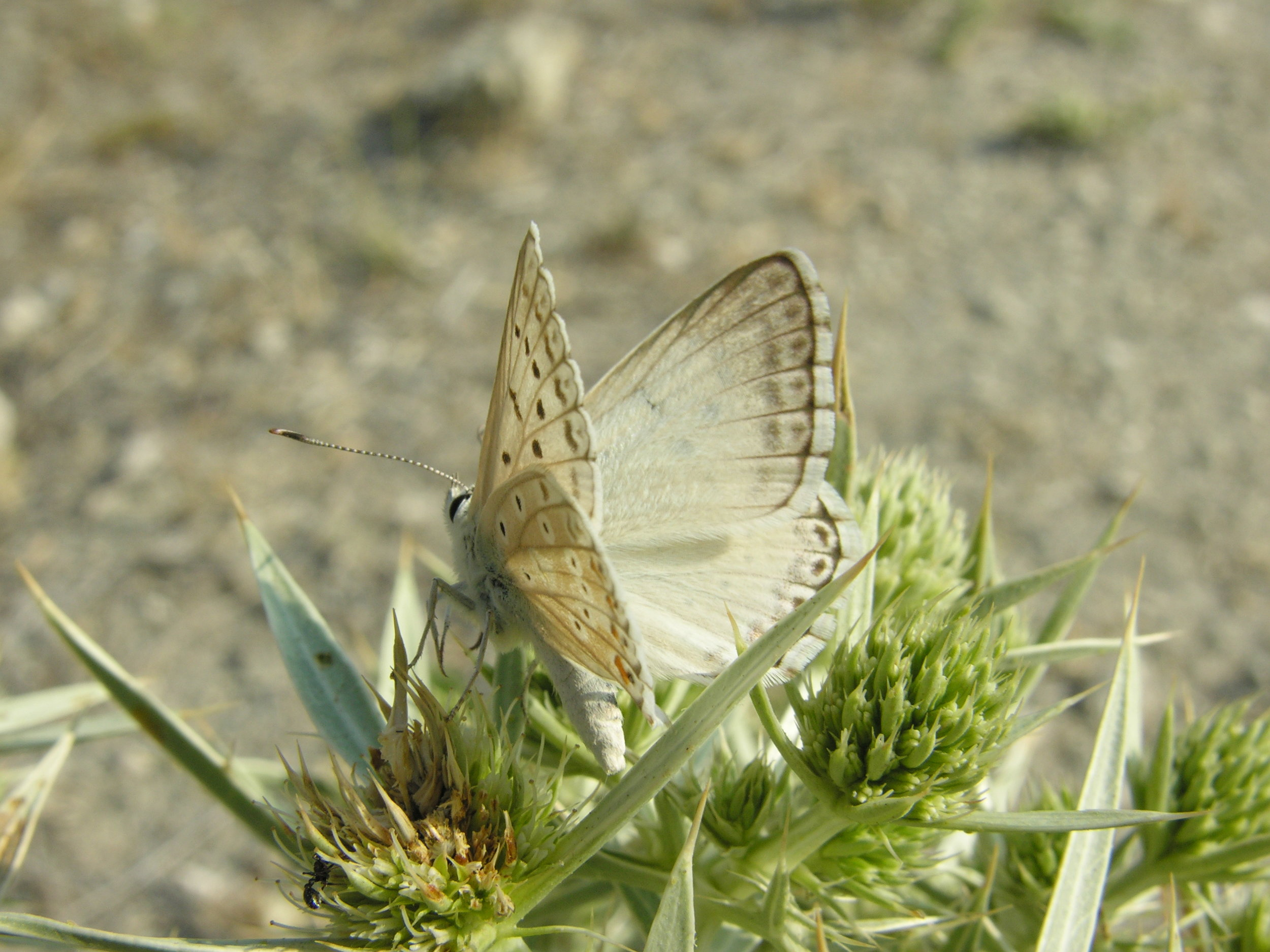
- Male

Conservation status
- Least Concern (IUCN 3.1)

Scientific classification
- Domain: Eukaryota
- Kingdom: Animalia
- Phylum: Arthropoda
- Class: Insecta
- Order: Lepidoptera
- Family: Lycaenidae
- Genus: Lysandra
- Species: L. albicans

Binomial name
- Lysandra albicans (Gerhard, 1851)

Synonyms
- Polyommatus albicans

= Lysandra albicans =

Species of butterfly

Lysandra albicans, the Spanish chalk-hill blue, is a butterfly of the family Lycaenidae. It is found in Spain and Western North Africa.

== Description ==
The length of the forewings is 18–21 mm. The species of Lysandra are very similar and difficult to identify and L. albicans was once a subspecies of Lysandra coridon. It is the palest of the complex. The upperside of the male is almost white, adorned with a sub marginal line of gray dots, sometimes very discoloured on the forewings. In the female it is brown with a short submarginal line of orange spots very discoloured on the forewings. The underside of the male is white-coloured or very light grey-blue adorned with a submarginal line of light spots while the female is ochre adorned with brown dots and a submarginal line of brown dots surrounded by orange colour that surrounding brown dots.

== Biology ==
The butterfly flies from June to August in a single generation. Its habitat consists of dry places with flowers, between rocks, 900 m to 1800 meters.

The larvae feed on Hippocrepis comosa and Hippocrepis multisiliquosa. They are attended by ants.
