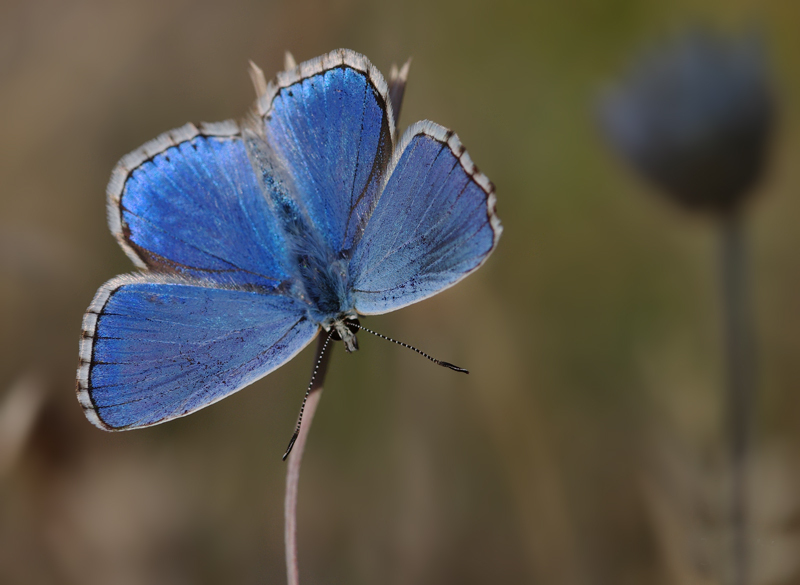

Scientific classification
- Domain: Eukaryota
- Kingdom: Animalia
- Phylum: Arthropoda
- Class: Insecta
- Order: Lepidoptera
- Family: Lycaenidae
- Genus: Lysandra
- Species: L. corydonius

Binomial name
- Lysandra corydonius (Herrich-Schäffer, [1852])

Synonyms
- Lycaena corydonius Herrich-Schäffer, [1852]; Polyommatus corydonius (Herrich-Schäffer, [1852]); Lysandra caeruleossmar Verity, 1939; Lysandra sokolowskii Wojtusiak & Niesiolowski, 1947; Lycaena corydon ciscaucasica Jachontov, 1914

= Lysandra corydonius =

Species of butterfly

Lysandra corydonius, the false chalkhill blue, is a butterfly of the family Lycaenidae. The species is distributed in south-eastern Europe, Caucasus, Transcaucasia, north-eastern Turkey, and north-western Iran. L.corydonius is very similar to Lysandra coridon but a slight violet sheen is present, especially in the outer area of the wings. It inhabits a wide variety of grasslands and woodlands. In Armenia it occurs from 1200 to 2000 m above sea level. The known larval host plants of the species in Turkey is Hippocrepis comosa, in the Caucasus - Coronilla varia. The species has not been assessed for the IUCN Red List. In Armenia from 2003 to 2013 its population increased.

== Subspecies ==
- Lysandra corydonius corydonius (Caucasus, Transcaucasus, north-eastern Turkey, north-western Iran)
- Lysandra corydonius ciscaucasica (Jachontov, 1914) (northern Caucasus, south-eastern Europe)
