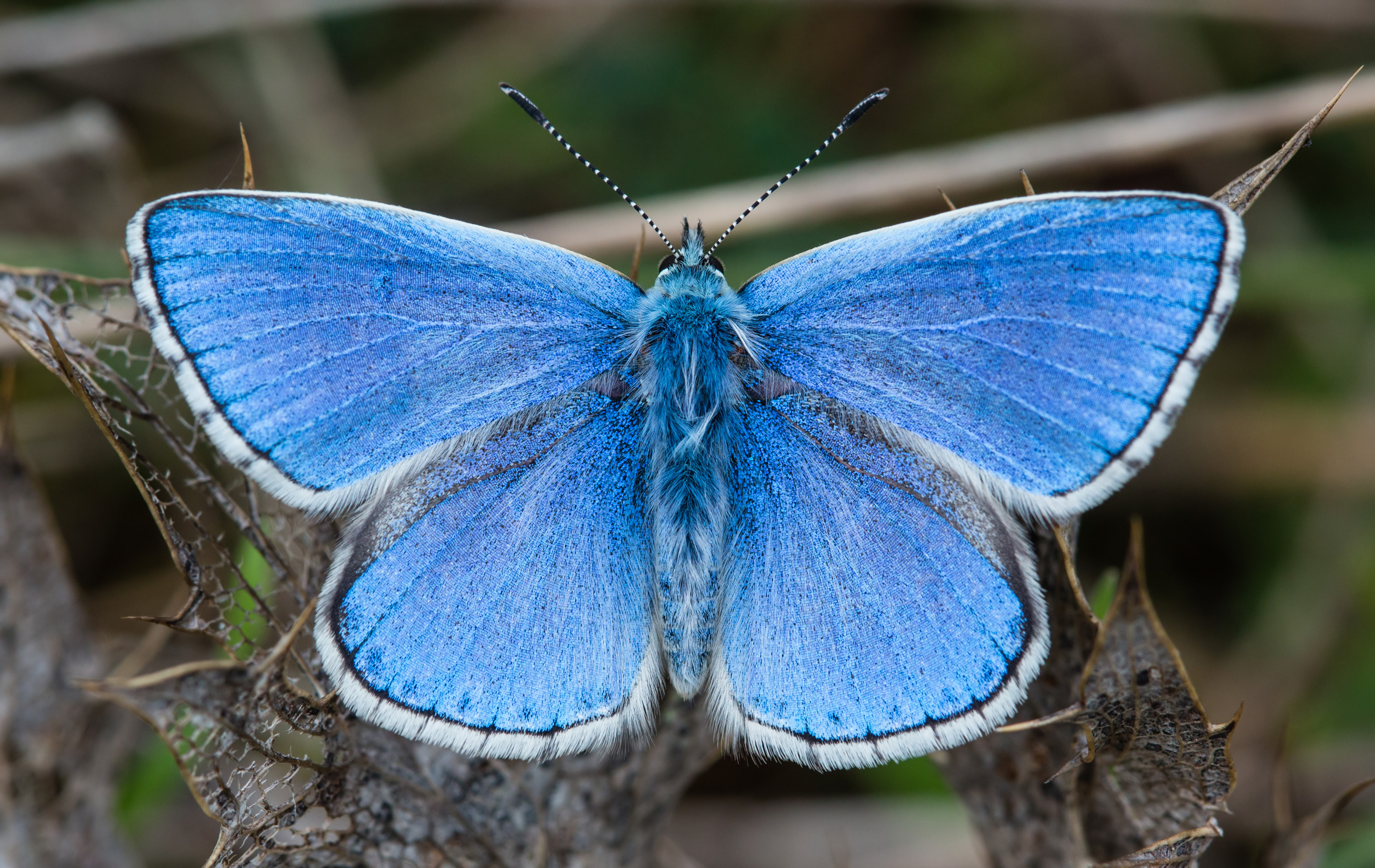
- Male, Aveyron, France
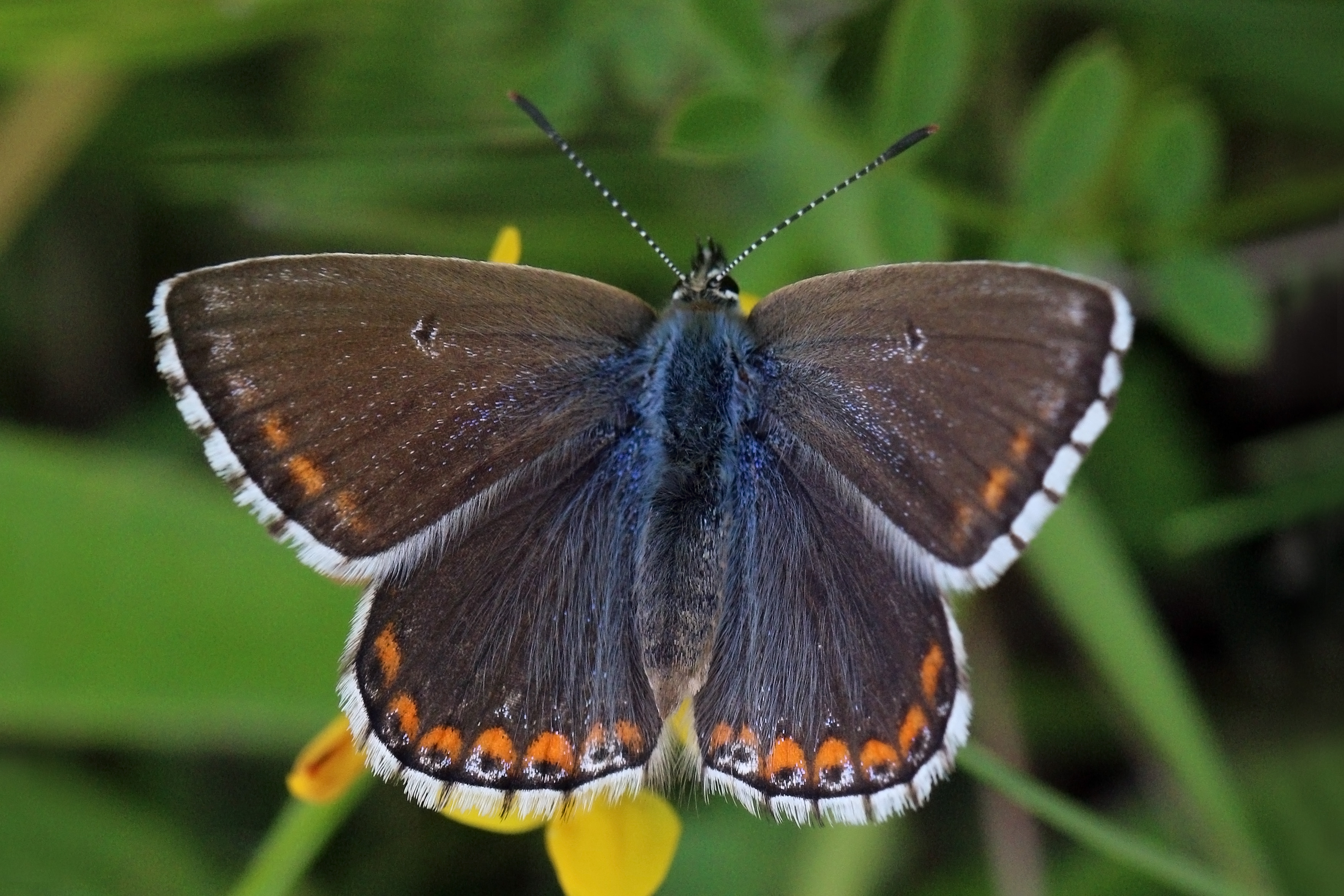
- Female, Buckinghamshire, United Kingdom

Conservation status
- Least Concern (IUCN 3.1)

Scientific classification
- Kingdom: Animalia
- Phylum: Arthropoda
- Class: Insecta
- Order: Lepidoptera
- Family: Lycaenidae
- Genus: Lysandra
- Species: L. bellargus

Binomial name
- Lysandra bellargus (Rottemburg, 1775)

Synonyms
- Papilio bellargus, Rottemburg, 1775; Polyommatus bellargus, (Rottemburg, 1775); Lycaena bellargus

= Adonis blue =

Species of butterfly

The Adonis blue (Lysandra bellargus, also known as Polyommatus bellargus) is a butterfly in the family Lycaenidae. It inhabits the Palearctic realm (Western Europe, Central Europe, Southern Europe, Southern Russia, Iraq, Iran, Caucasus, Transcaucasus, and Turkey).

It is found in chalk downland, in warm, sheltered spots, flying low over vegetation, seeking females that are rich chocolate brown in color. The male has brilliantly colored blue wings that give it its name.

== Description ==
The male has the upper side wings a brilliant sky blue, with a fine black line round the edge and a white margin. The female is chocolate brown with a few blue scales near the base, and with orange spots, bordered by blue scales, around the edge of the hind wing. The fringes are chequered both sexes. The underside is brownish grey with black and orange crescent spots. The wingspan is about 3 cm (1.2 in). The caterpillar reaches 1.6 centimetres (0.63 in) in length, has a dark green body with dark spines, and yellow bands along the back and sides.

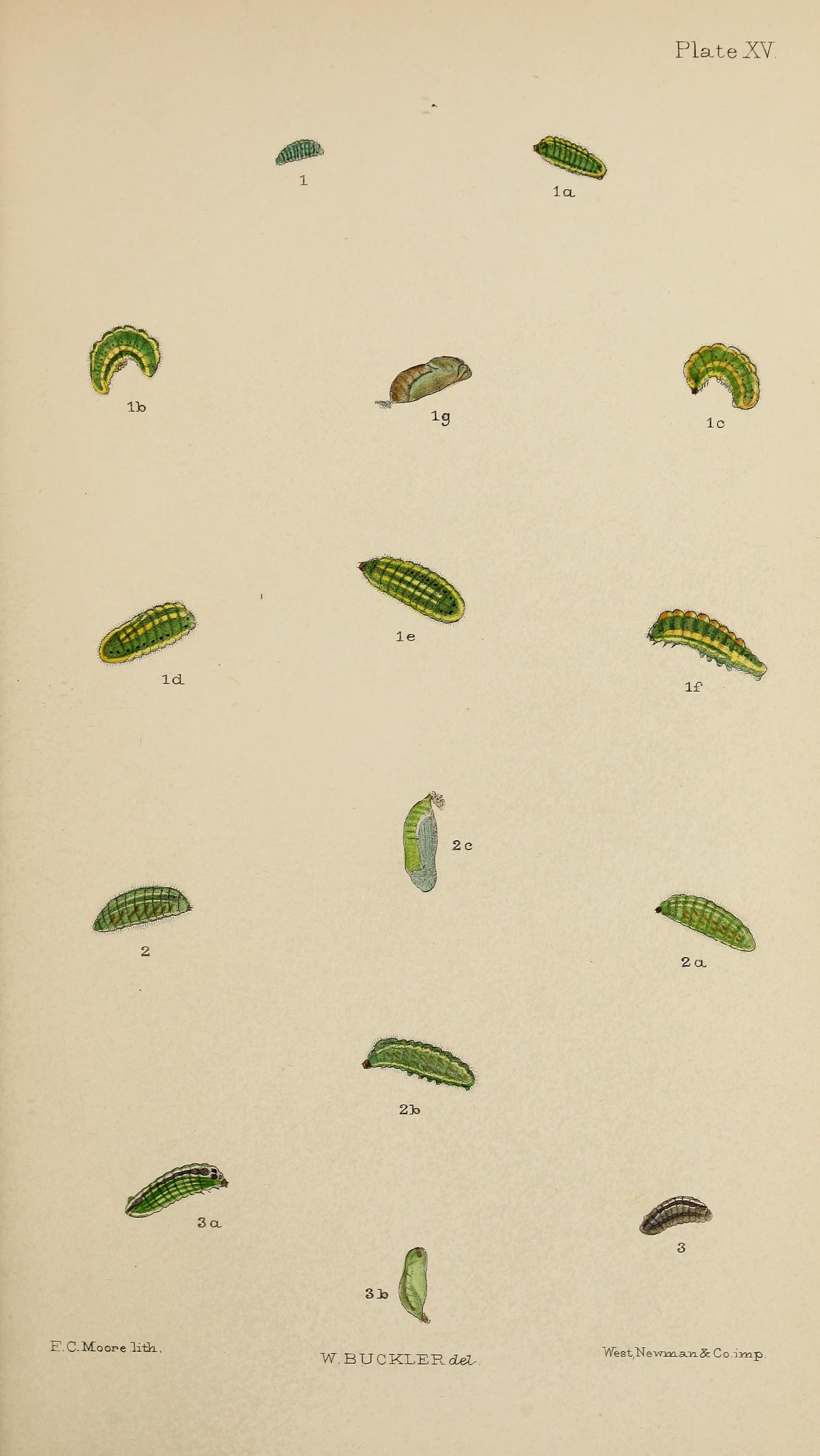
larva before last moult 1a, 1b, 1c, 1d, 1e, 1f larva after last moult 1g pupa

=== Description in Seitz ===
L. bellargus Rott. (81 h). Of the size of icarus but the male above of a very light and glittering sky-blue: the female dark brown, with a red submarginal band and on the forewing a black discocellular spot. The underside bears some resemblance to that of coridon, as the rings of the ocelli are large and contrast conspicuously with the brown ground, which is especially dark in the female. Central and Southern Europe, as well as Anterior Asia as far as Kurdistan. — Of aberrations in the upperside we mention first the very light blue and very strongly glossy ab. adonis Hbn. The opposite development is found in ab. pallida Tutt which is duller and more lilac than ordinary bellargus. ab. suffusa Tutt (= czekelii Aign.) has the suffused blue shaded with plumbeous, which lessens the brilliancy of the colour, ab. ceronus Esp. are females whose upperside is strongly dusted with blue. — polonus Z. (81 c) [Lysandra × polonus (Zeller, 1845)] is found only in certain districts East Prussia, Russia, Syria and Spain; the light blue colour is shaded with silvery, the black border is somewhat broader and the hindwing bears dark dots at the outer margin. — females with the red submarginal band of the upperside very broad are ab. latefasciata Schultz — In Algeria flies a form which has a magnificent glossy blue upperside, is usually somewhat larger than Central European specimens and has distinct black spots before the distal margin of the hindwing above; this is punctifera Oberth. (81 c) [now a full species]. Also in Europe occur occasionally specimens with traces of some submarginal dots on the hindwing above, without the other characters of punctifera; Aigner-Abafi named this form ab. parvipuncta. If such dots are present on the forewing, we have ab. puncta Tutt. The ocelli of the underside may either be so enlarged that some become confluent (confluens Aign., striata Tutt), or they may become obsolete: ab. krodeli Gillm. (= cinnides Stgr., adonis Hbn. pt.) (81 c). The specimens in which only the usually present basal ocelli of the forewing are absent are ab. sapphirus Meig. — Egg semiglobular, with the top somewhat impressed, pale green, reticulated with white. Larva bright leaf-green, with dark dorsal stripe accompanied by small orange yellow spots, which form two subdorsal lines; similar yellow stripes on the sides; head black. Until April and again in the summer on Hippocrepis and Coronilla. Pupa green or brown, with a dark stripe on the back, on or close to the ground. The butterflies are on the wing in May and June and again in August, in the South a third time in September and October. They love open places, fallow ground, young plantations and sunny slopes; they rest in day-time with open wings and sleep on Umbels, Thistles, and Scabious, also on stalks of grass, keeping the wings tightly closed. When disturbed they fall with a jump into the grass. They are common at their flight-places in most districts and occur in mountains up to 2,100 metres (7,000 ft).

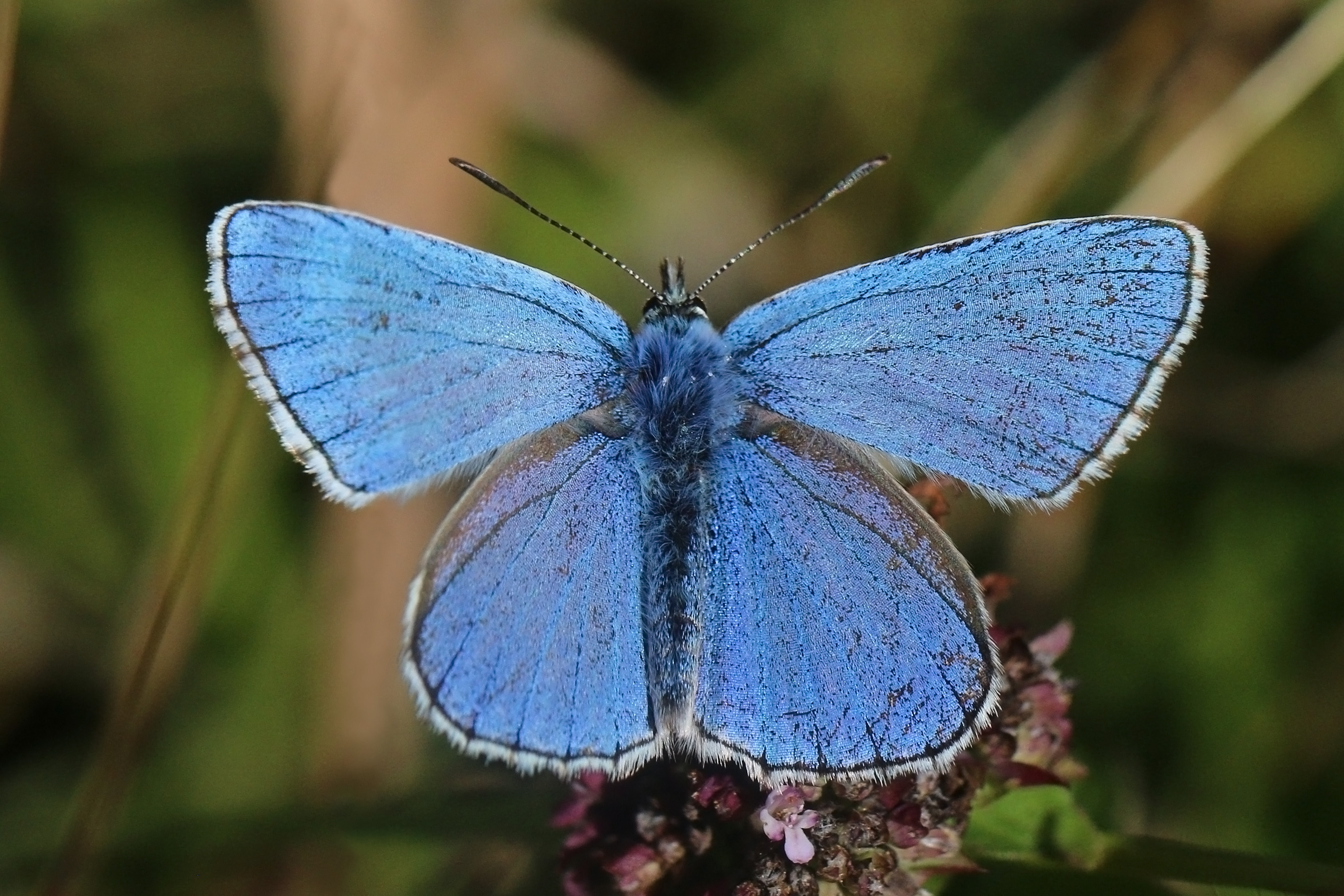
Male (wing topside)

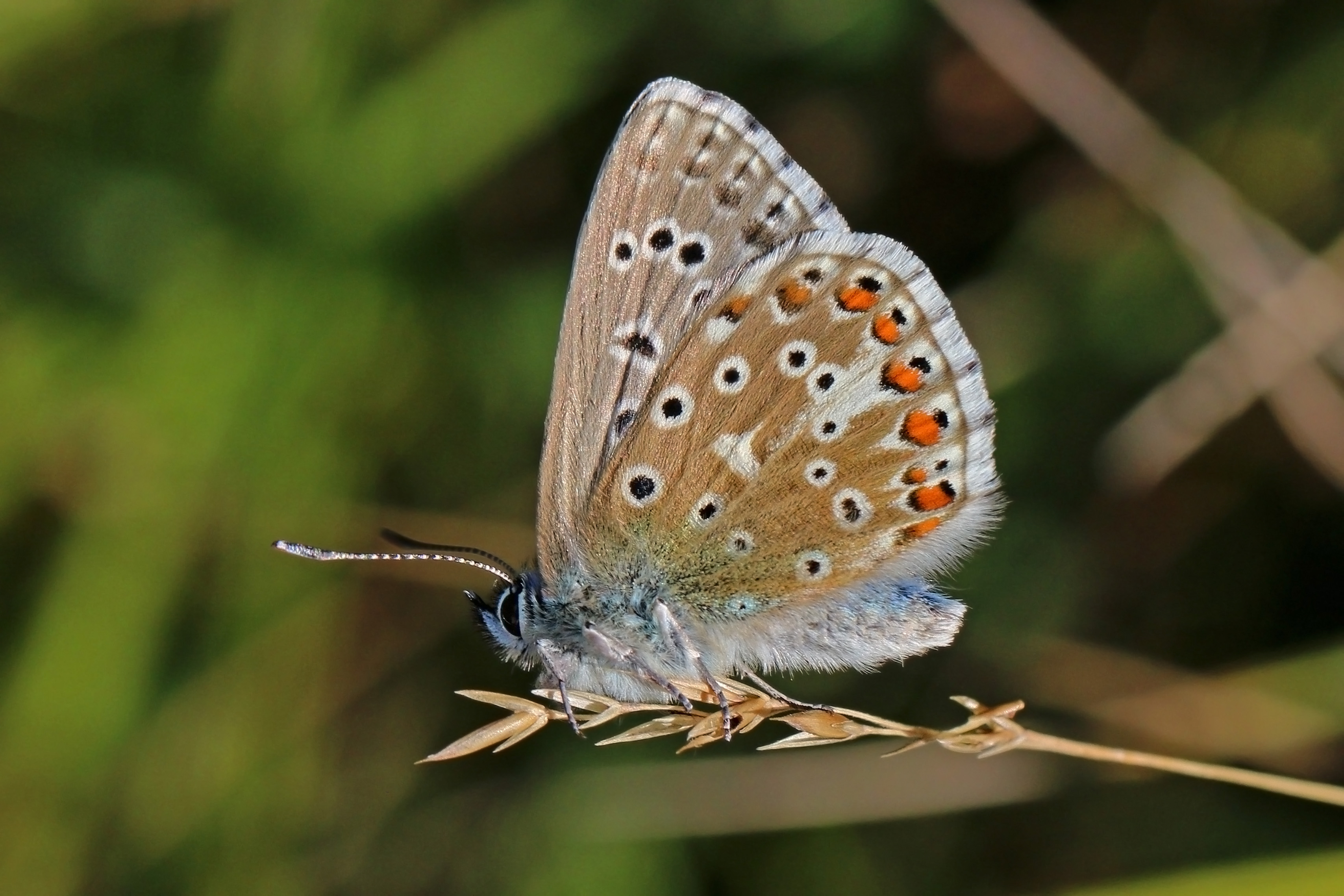
Male (wing underside)

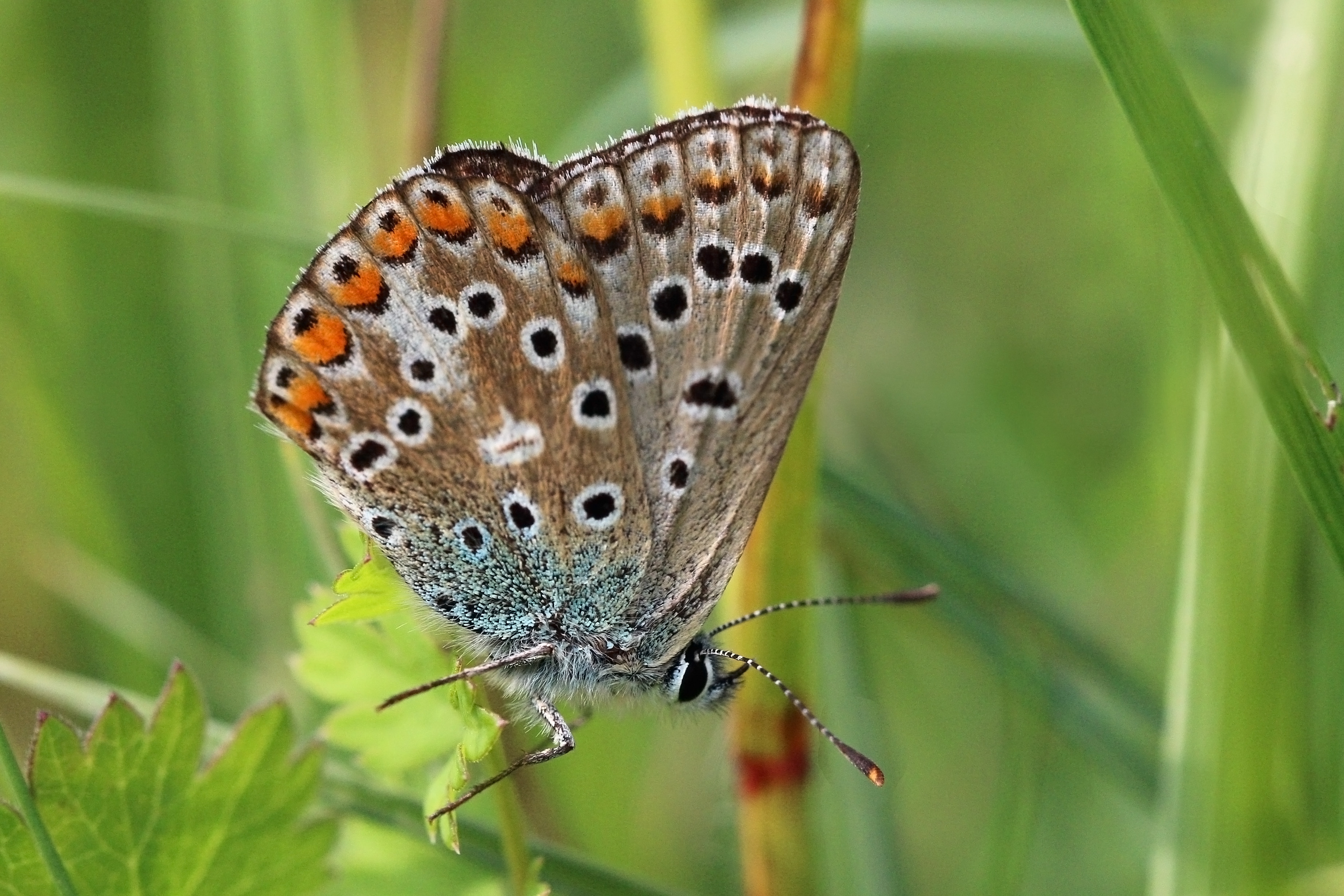
Female (blue colouration)

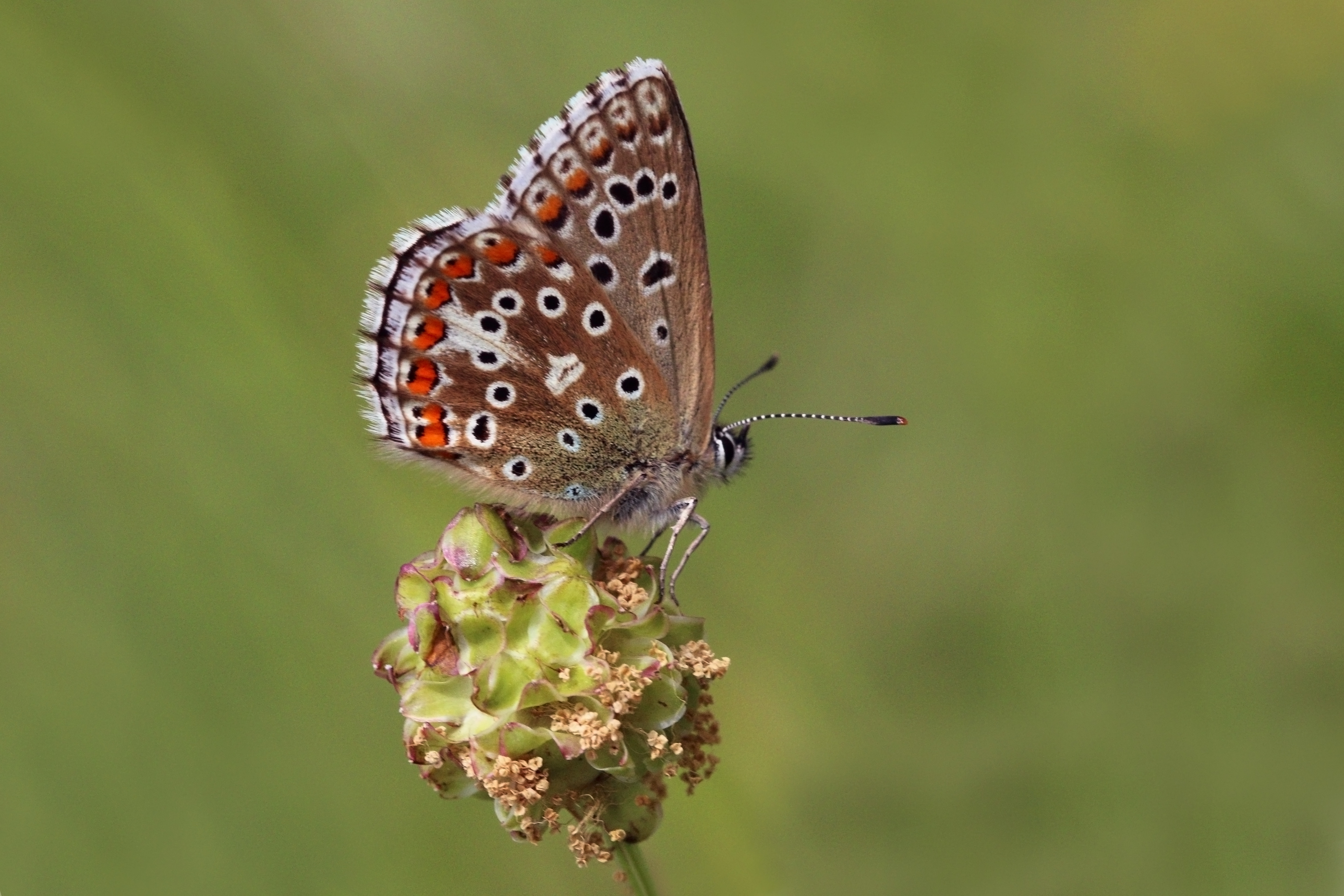
Female (green colouration)

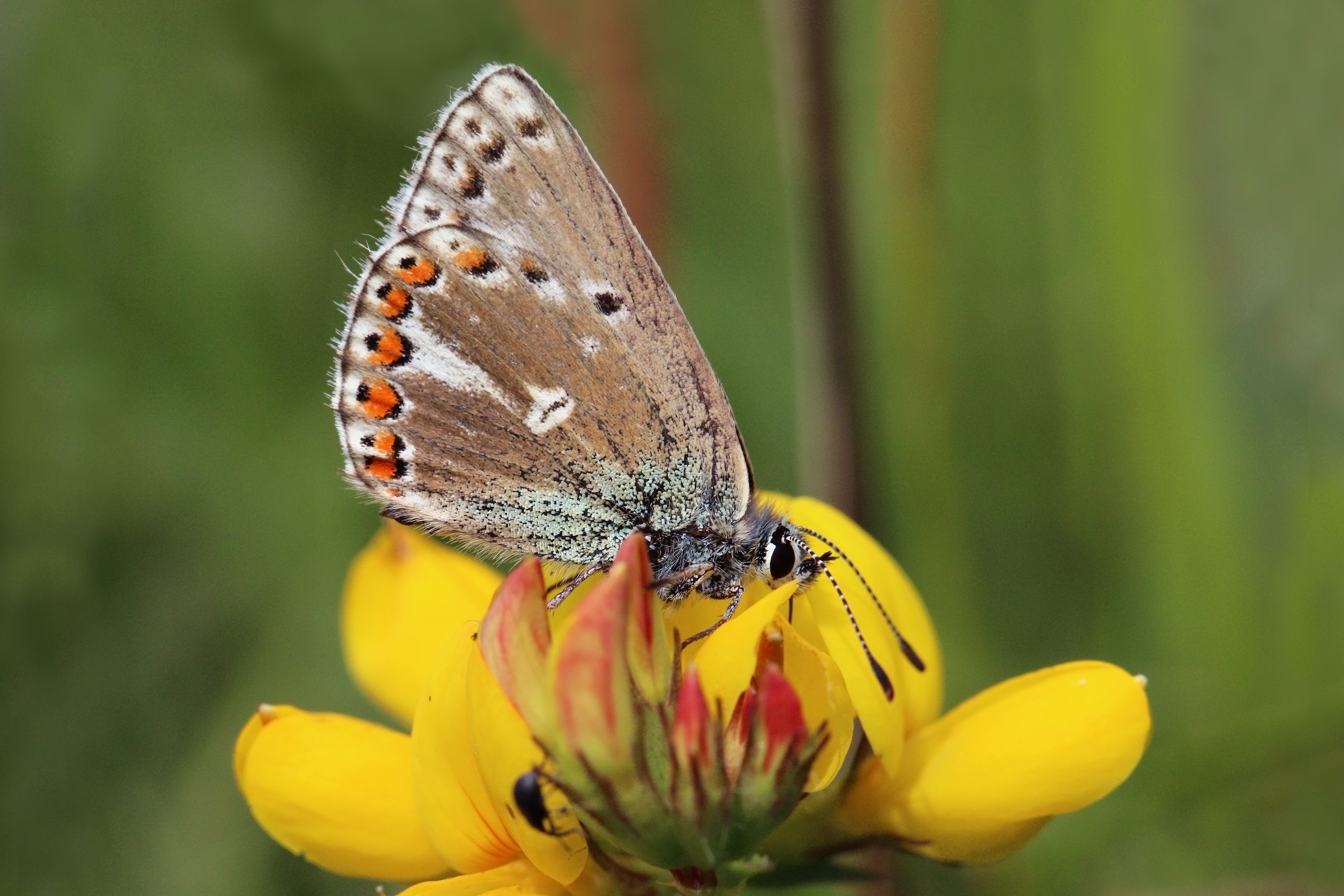
Female
aberration obsoleta

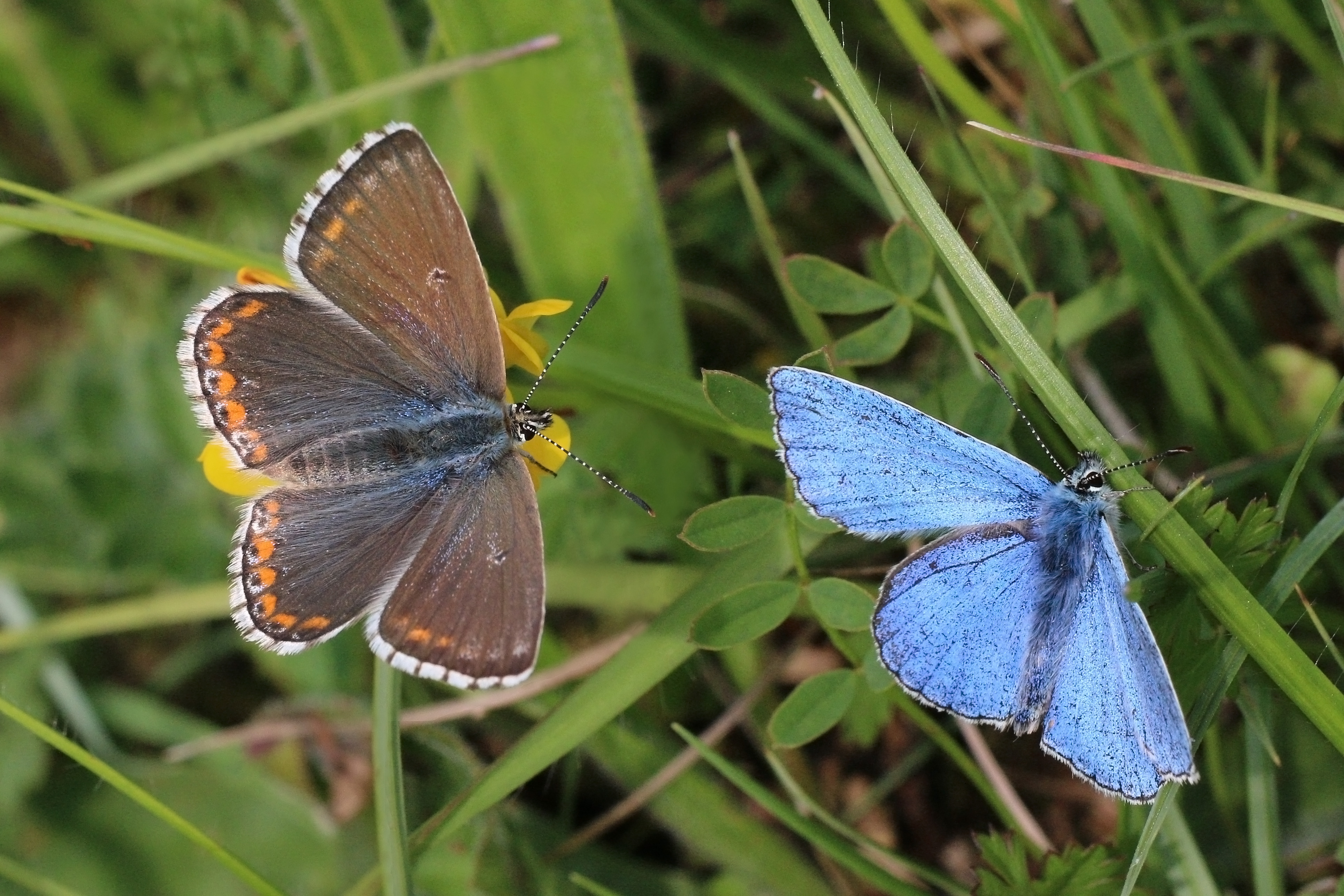
Courting pair

== Taxonomy ==
German entomologist S. A. von Rottemburg described the Adonis blue in 1775 as Papilio bellargus, noting it was very rare locally but came to his garden in June.

== Habitat ==
The preferred habitat of the Adonis blue is calcareous grasslands with hot and dry conditions. This is because the larva feeds on horseshoe vetch (Hippocrepis comosa) which is largely restricted to these habitats. This plant flourishes on sheep-grazed pastures and disappears after a few years when cattle graze. Sometimes human-created landforms provide refuges for the plant and the butterfly; an example of this is on Martin Down in Dorset, where horseshoe vetch only occurs on ancient earthworks with thin calcareous soils.

== Species decline (Great Britain) ==
The Adonis blue is at the most northerly edge of its range in Britain and has always been restricted to the warmer dry calcareous grasslands of southern England. It has been declining over the last fifty years because its habitat has been disappearing through changing agricultural practices; over the whole of Britain there has been a decline of over 90% in numbers since 1950. It has been lost from Cambridgeshire, Essex and Suffolk; its strongholds are Dorset, Wiltshire, Sussex and the Isle of Wight. There are efforts from conservation organisations and local Biodiversity Action Plans to encourage the populations of chalk-grassland butterflies through managed grazing programs. The recent hot and dry weather associated with climate change seems to be beneficial for this species by making more habitats suitable. In 2006 it had returned to a site in the Cotswolds in Gloucestershire, where it had vanished 40 years previously.

== Biology ==
- Winter is passed as a small caterpillar
- Habitat: Flowery hillsides on chalk and limestone
- Food plant: Horseshoe vetch
- Flight: May–September, in two broods

== Etymology ==
Bellargus (from Latin, literally) - more beautiful than Argus ( Plebejus argus ).

== See also ==
- List of butterflies of Great Britain
