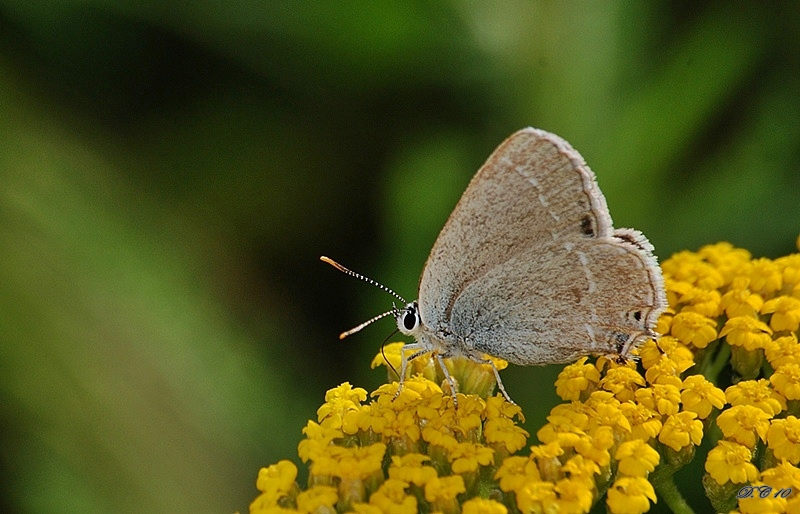

Scientific classification
- Domain: Eukaryota
- Kingdom: Animalia
- Phylum: Arthropoda
- Class: Insecta
- Order: Lepidoptera
- Family: Lycaenidae
- Genus: Satyrium
- Species: S. abdominalis

Binomial name
- Satyrium abdominalis (Gerhard, 1850)

= Satyrium abdominalis =

Gerhard's black hairstreak

Species of butterfly

Satyrium abdominalis, the Gerhard's black hairstreak, is a butterfly in the family Lycaenidae.

== Distribution ==
The Gerhard's black hairstreak is a common species in Turkey.

== Habitat ==
The Gerhard's black hairstreak prefers bushy rocky slopes and ravines.
