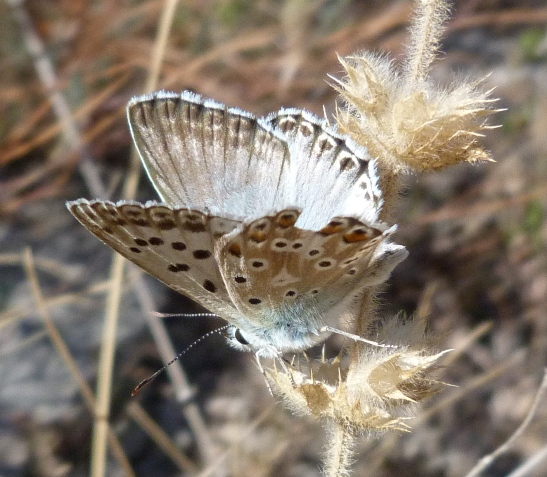
- Male at El Mas de Bondia, Lleida, Catalonia, Spain
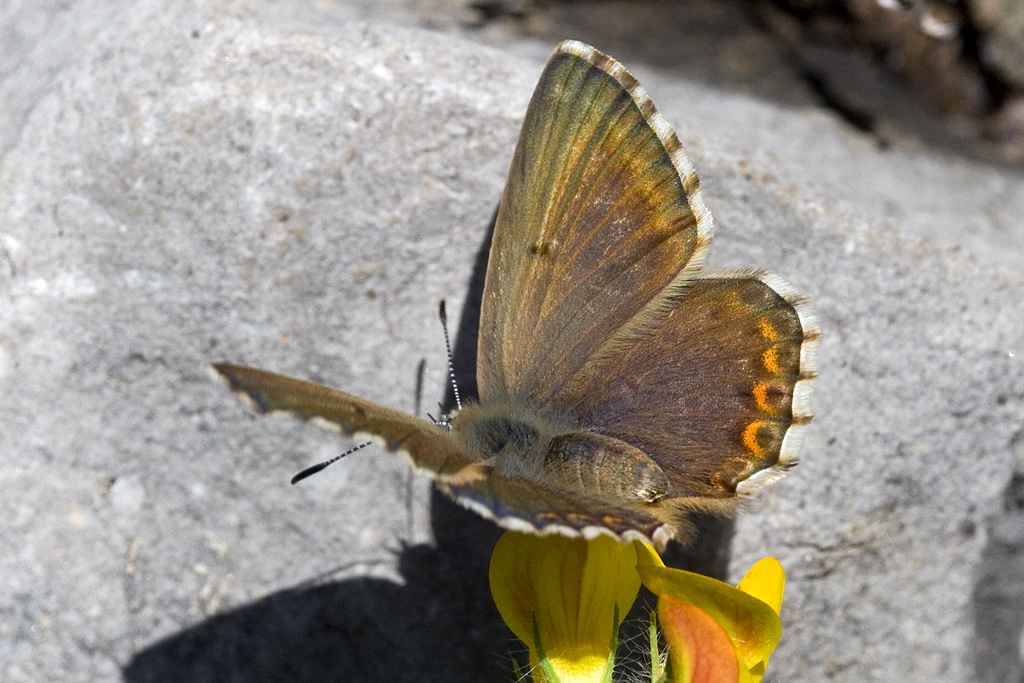
- Female

Scientific classification
- Kingdom: Animalia
- Phylum: Arthropoda
- Class: Insecta
- Order: Lepidoptera
- Family: Lycaenidae
- Genus: Lysandra
- Species: L. hispana

Binomial name
- Lysandra hispana (Herrich-Schäffer, [1851])

Synonyms
- Polyommatus hispanus; Polyommatus hispana

= Lysandra hispana =

Species of insect

Lysandra hispana, the Provence chalk-hill blue, is a butterfly of the family Lycaenidae. It is found in Spain, southern France and northern Italy.

The wingspan is 16–18 mm. It is very similar to Lysandra coridon but is paler (greyer and duller, greyish pearly-blue, nacreous blue) with the distal margin more strongly spotted. However both are very variable. The butterfly is on wing from April to September in two generations. The habitat is dry grassland on chalk or limestone.

The larvae feed on horseshoe vetch.
