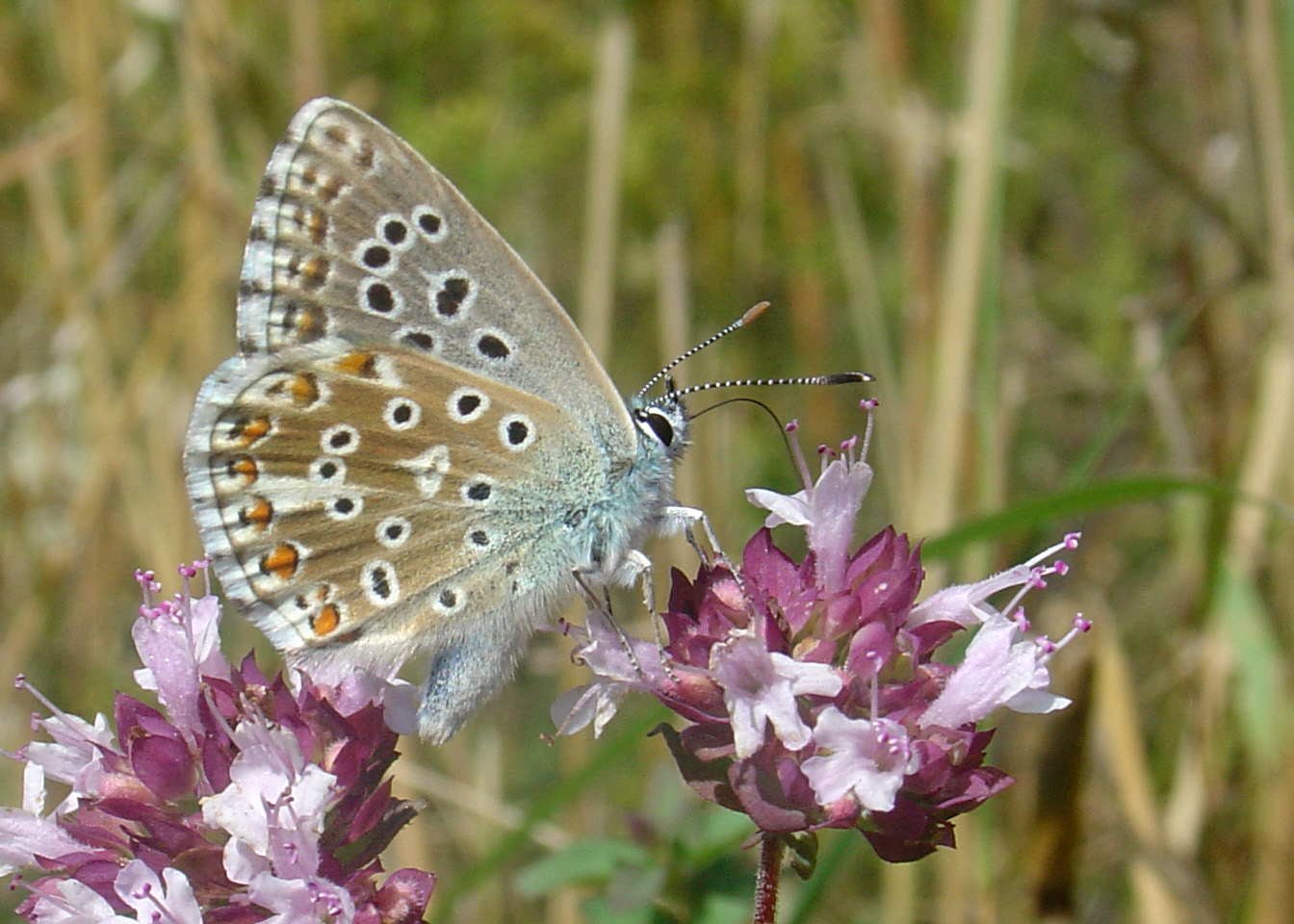
- Lysandra bellargus

Scientific classification
- Kingdom: Animalia
- Phylum: Arthropoda
- Clade: Pancrustacea
- Class: Insecta
- Order: Lepidoptera
- Family: Lycaenidae
- Subfamily: Polyommatinae
- Tribe: Polyommatini
- Genus: Lysandra; Hemming, 1933

Synonyms
- Argus Scopoli, 1763; Uranops Hemming, 1929

= Lysandra (butterfly) =

Butterfly genus in family Lycaenidae

Lysandra is a genus of butterflies in the family Lycaenidae.

== Species ==
Listed alphabetically:

- Lysandra albicans (Gerhard, 1851)
- Lysandra apennina (Zeller, 1847)
- Lysandra arzanovi (Stradomsky & Shchurov, 2005)
- Lysandra bellargus (Rottemburg, 1775)
- Lysandra caelestissima (Verity, 1921)
- Lysandra caucasica (Lederer, 1870)
- Lysandra coridon (Poda, 1761)
- Lysandra corydonius (Herrich-Schäffer, [1852])
- Lysandra dezina de Freina & Witt, 1983
- Lysandra gennargenti Leigheb, 1987
- Lysandra hispana (Herrich-Schäffer, [1851])
- Lysandra melamarina Dantchenko, 2000
- Lysandra nufrellensis Schurian, 1977
- Lysandra ossmar (Gerhard, 1851)
- Lysandra punctifera (Oberthür, 1876)
- Lysandra sheikh Dantchenko, 2000
- Lysandra syriaca (Tutt, 1914)
