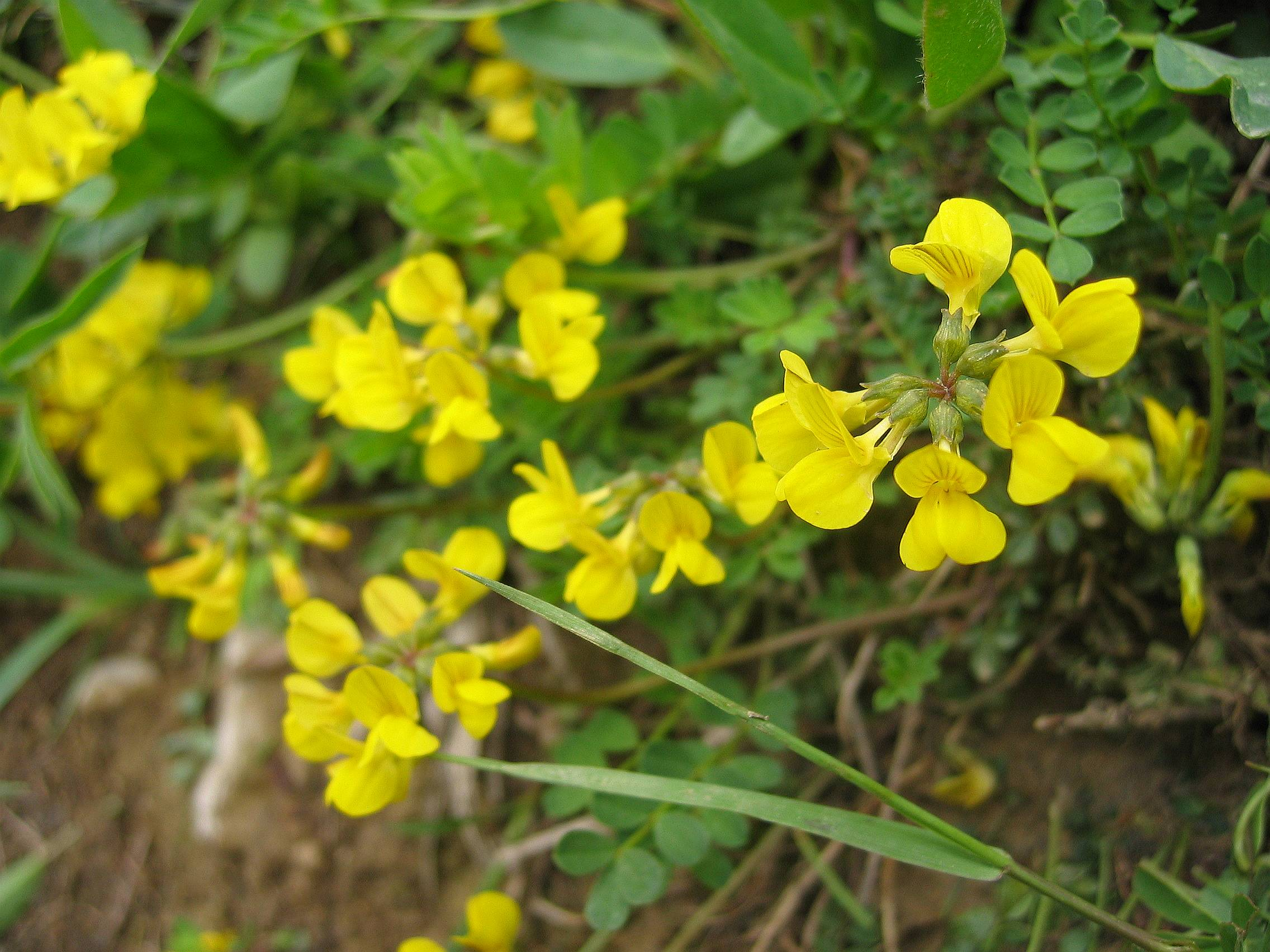
- Hippocrepis comosa

Scientific classification
- Kingdom: Plantae
- Clade: Tracheophytes
- Clade: Angiosperms
- Clade: Eudicots
- Clade: Rosids
- Order: Fabales
- Family: Fabaceae
- Subfamily: Faboideae
- Tribe: Loteae
- Genus: Hippocrepis; L. (1753)

Species
- 34; see text

Synonyms
- Emerus Mill. (1754); Ferrum-equinum Tourn. ex Medik. (1787)

= Hippocrepis =

Genus of legumes

Hippocrepis is a genus of flowering plants in the legume family, Fabaceae. It includes 34 species native to Europe, northern Africa, and western Asia.

== Etymology ==
The name "Hippocrepis" comes from the Greek for "horse" (hippo-) and for "shoe" (-krepis): literally, "horseshoe"; this is descriptive of the shape of the fruit segments in some species.

== Species ==
34 species are accepted.

- Hippocrepis areolata Desv.
- Hippocrepis atlantica Ball
- Hippocrepis balearica Jacq.
- Hippocrepis biflora Spreng.
- Hippocrepis brevipetala (Murb.) E.Domínguez
- Hippocrepis carpetana Lassen
- Hippocrepis castroviejoi Talavera & E.Domínguez
- Hippocrepis ciliata Willd.
- Hippocrepis commutata Pau
- Hippocrepis comosa L. – horseshoe vetch
- Hippocrepis conradiae Gamisans & Hugot
- Hippocrepis constricta Kunze
- Hippocrepis cyclocarpa Murb.
- Hippocrepis emerus (L.) Lassen – scorpion senna
- Hippocrepis eriocarpa (Boiss.) Boiss.
- Hippocrepis fruticescens Sennen
- Hippocrepis glauca Ten.
- Hippocrepis grosii (Pau) Boira, Gil & L.Llorens
- Hippocrepis liouvillei Maire
- Hippocrepis maura Braun-Blanq. & Maire
- Hippocrepis minor Munby
- Hippocrepis monticola Durieu ex Lassen
- Hippocrepis multisiliquosa L.
- Hippocrepis neglecta Lassen
- Hippocrepis nevadensis (Hrabětová) Talavera & E.Domínguez
- Hippocrepis prostrata Boiss.
- Hippocrepis rupestris Laza
- Hippocrepis salzmannii Boiss. & Reut.
- Hippocrepis scabra DC.
- Hippocrepis scorpioides Req. ex Benth.
- Hippocrepis squamata (Cav.) Coss.
- Hippocrepis tavera-mendozae Talavera & E.Domínguez
- Hippocrepis unisiliquosa L.
- Hippocrepis valentina Boiss.
