= Lysandra apennina =

Scientific classification
- Domain: Eukaryota
- Kingdom: Animalia
- Phylum: Arthropoda
- Class: Insecta
- Order: Lepidoptera
- Family: Lycaenidae
- Genus: Lysandra
- Species: L. apennina

Binomial name
- Lysandra apennina (Zeller, 1847)

Synonyms
- Polyommatus corydon var. apennina Zeller, 1847; Polyommatus apennina Zeller, 1847

Species of butterfly

Lysandra apennina is a butterfly in the family Lycaenidae. It was described by Philipp Christoph Zeller in 1847. It is found in Italy. It is often regarded as a subspecies of Lysandra coridon. It is on the whole paler than coridon, the dark marginal border of the forewing being lighter in consequence of an intermixture of the ground-colour.
