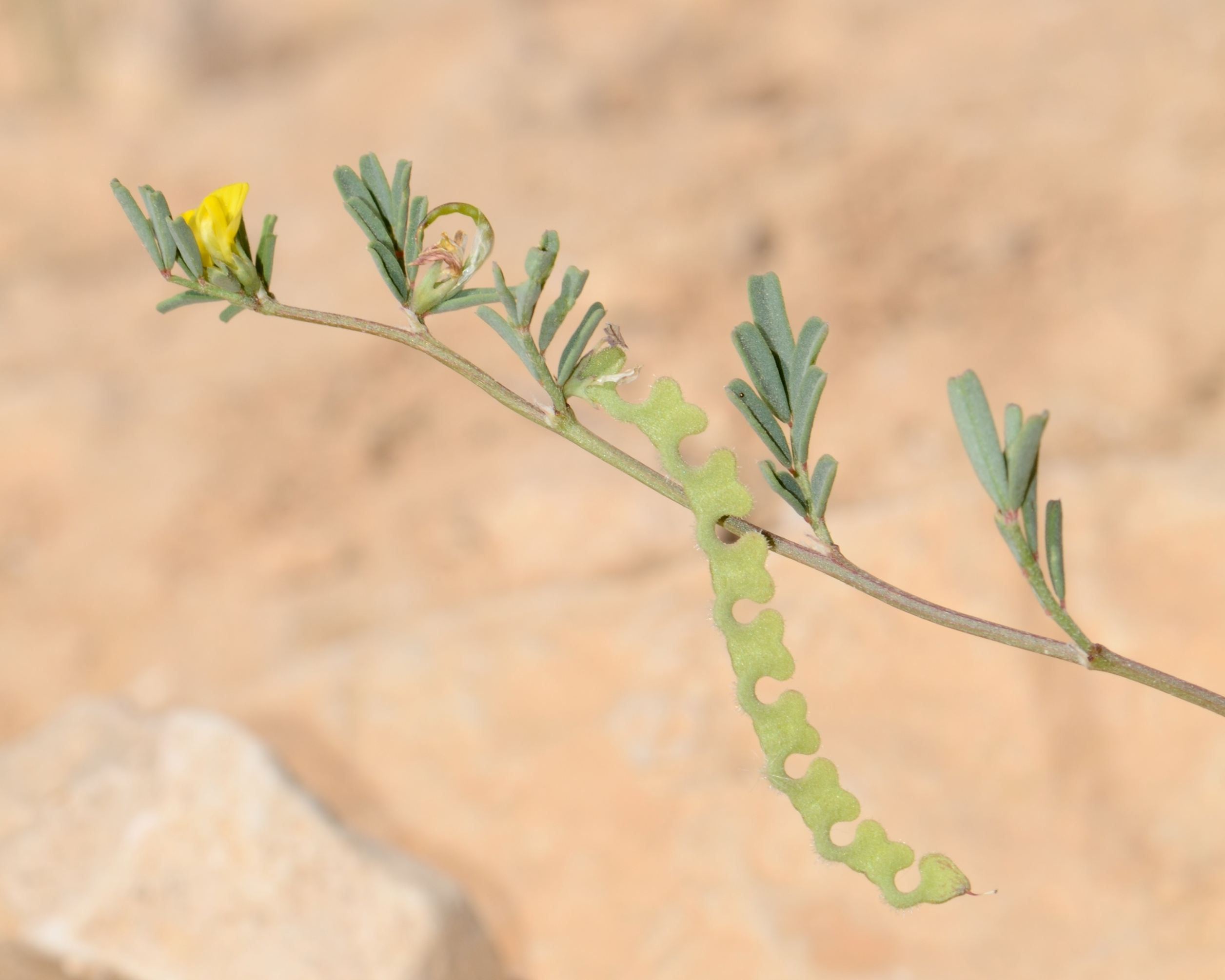

Scientific classification
- Kingdom: Plantae
- Clade: Tracheophytes
- Clade: Angiosperms
- Clade: Eudicots
- Clade: Rosids
- Order: Fabales
- Family: Fabaceae
- Subfamily: Faboideae
- Genus: Hippocrepis
- Species: H. biflora

Binomial name
- Hippocrepis biflora Spreng.

Synonyms
- Hippocrepis unisiliquosa subsp. biflora

= Hippocrepis biflora =

Species of plant

Hippocrepis biflora is a species of annual herb in the family Fabaceae. Individuals can grow to 17 cm tall.

== Sources ==
This article incorporates text from a free content work. Licensed under CC0 (license statement/permission). Text taken from Hippocrepis biflora. Encyclopedia of Life.
