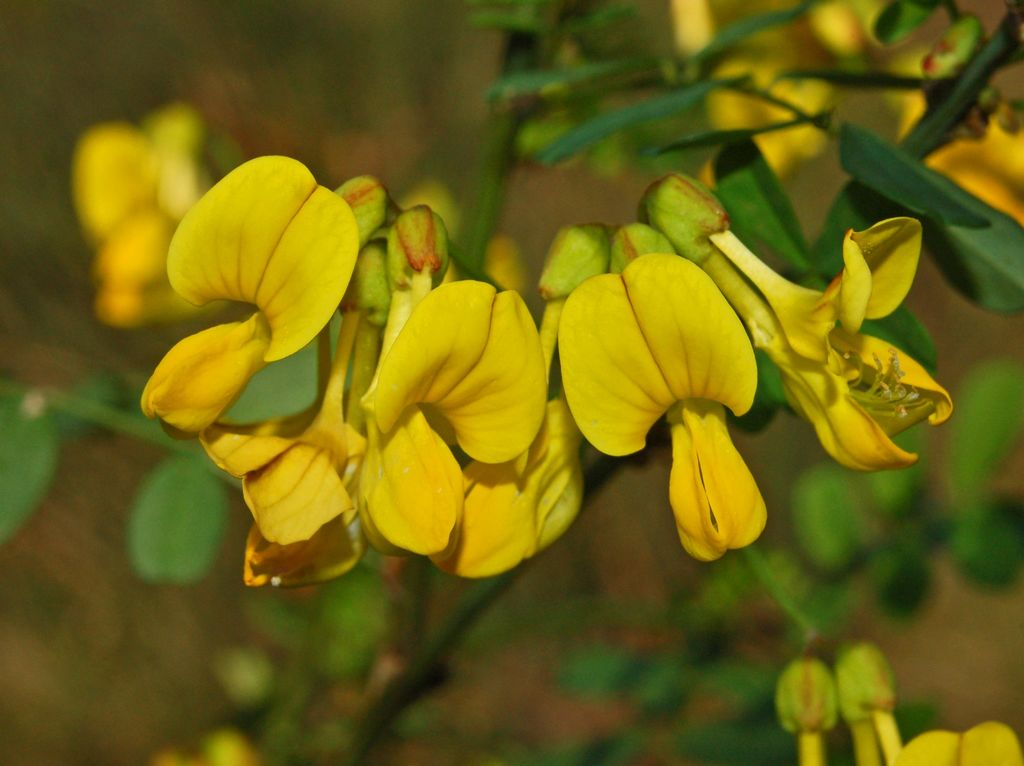
- Flowers of Hippocrepis emerus

Scientific classification
- Kingdom: Plantae
- Clade: Tracheophytes
- Clade: Angiosperms
- Clade: Eudicots
- Clade: Rosids
- Order: Fabales
- Family: Fabaceae
- Subfamily: Faboideae
- Genus: Hippocrepis
- Species: H. emerus

Binomial name
- Hippocrepis emerus (L.) Lassen

Synonyms
- Emerus major Mill., Gard. Dict. ed. 8 n.º 1 (1768); Coronilla emerus L., Sp. Pl. 742 (1753); Emerus alpestris Scheele in Flora 27: 443 (1843); Emerus caesalpini Medik. in Vorles. Churpfälz. Phys.-Ökon. Ges. 2: 368 (1787); Coronilla florida Salisb., Prodr. Stirp. Chap. Allerton 341 (1796), nom. illeg.; Emerus fruticosus Hornem., Hort. Bot. Hafn. 695 (1815); Emerus hortensis Desv. in Mém. Soc. Linn. Paris 4: 299 (1826)1

= Hippocrepis emerus =

Species of legume

Hippocrepis emerus, the scorpion senna, is a species of perennial plant belonging to the genus Hippocrepis in the family Fabaceae.

== Description ==
Hippocrepis emerus reaches on average 50–150 centimetres (20–59 in) of height, with a maximum of 200 centimetres (79 in). The plant has a lignified stem with green branches bearing five to nine leaflets. These leaves are glossy, obovate, and imparipinnate, with their maximum width being above the middle and often larger extremities. The pale yellow flowers are arranged in groups of 1 to 5, and measure 14–20 millimetres (0.55–0.79 in) long. The petals are "nailed", meaning they have a long handle ("nail") and a "plate". The nails of the petals are two to three times longer than the calyx. These plants are hermaphroditic and entomophilous, and their flowering period extends from April through July. Their legumes (seed pods) are oblong-cylindrical and 5–11 centimetres (2.0–4.3 in) long, with three to twelve segments.

== Distribution ==
This plant occurs in northeastern Spain and in central Mediterranean countries up to northern Europe and to Asia Minor and Tunisia.

== Habitat ==
These shrubs are usually found in wooded and bushy areas, on sunny, warm and dry slopes and around forest edges. They can be found at an altitude of 0–1,850 metres (0–6,070 ft).

== Food source ==
H. emerus is one of the main host plants of the moth Zygaena ephialtes.

== Gallery ==
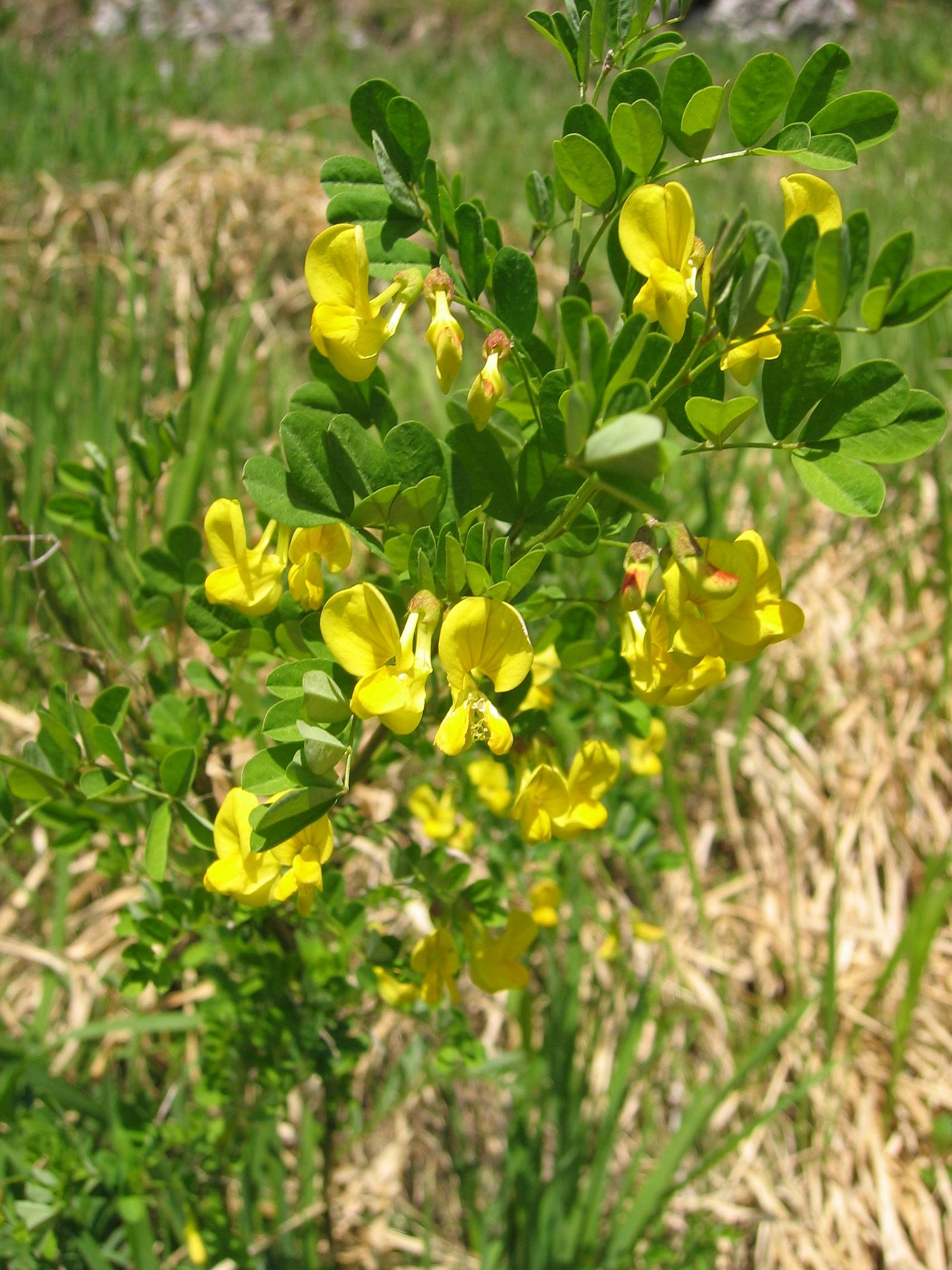
Plant of Hippocrepis emerus

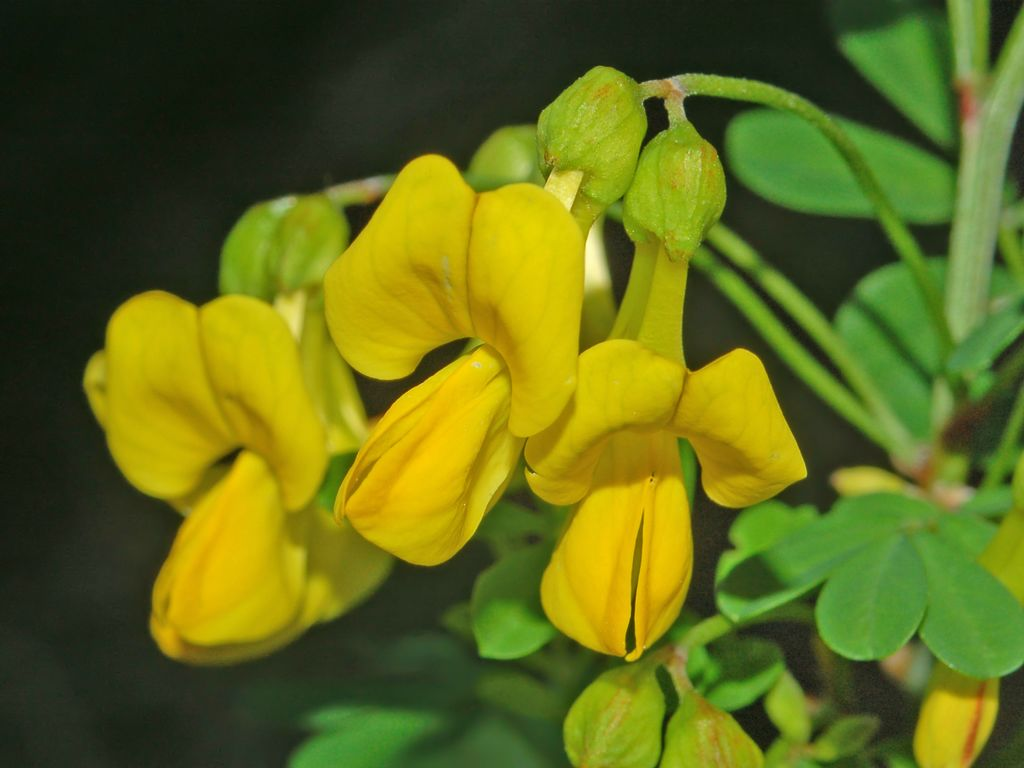
Flowers of Hippocrepis emerus

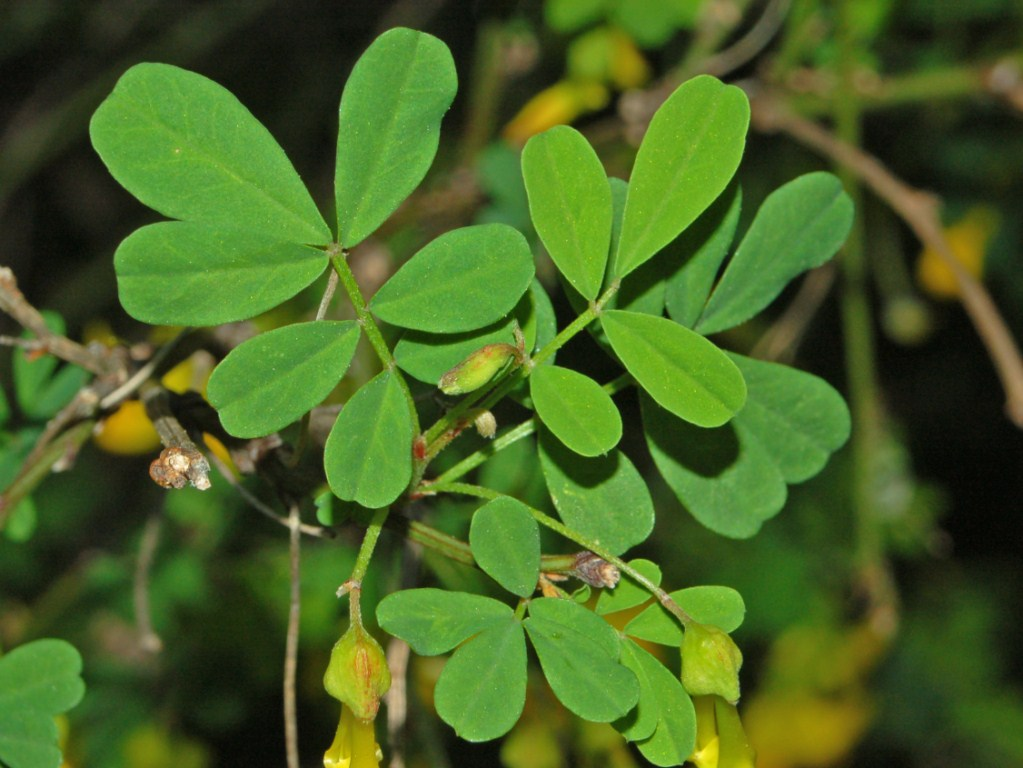
Leaves of Hippocrepis emerus

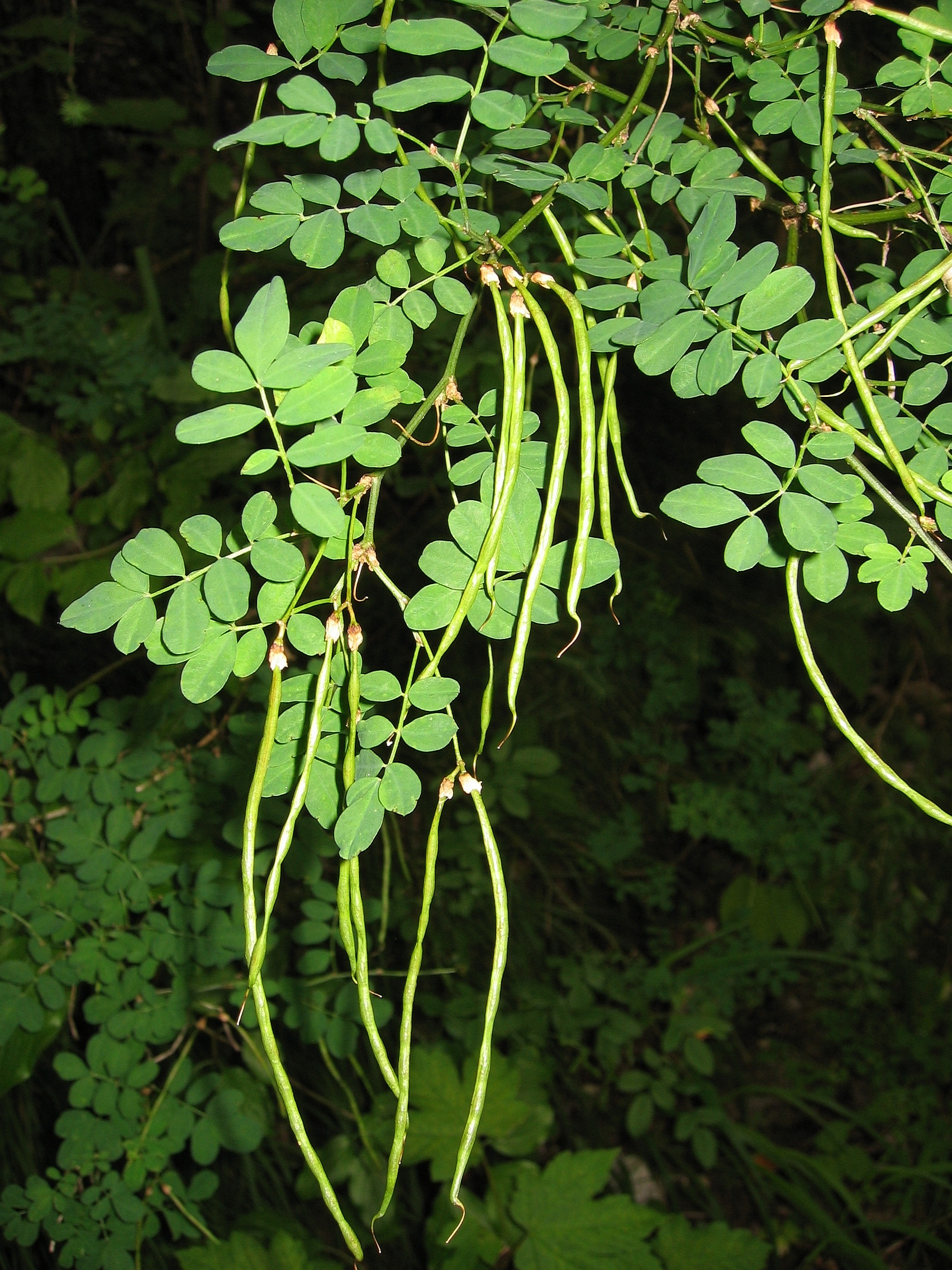
Fruits of Hippocrepis emerus
