= Paul Bernhard Gerhard =

German entomologist

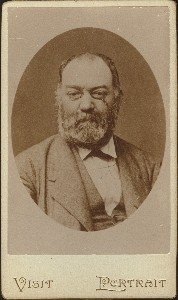
Paul Bernhard Gerhard

Paul Bernhard Gerhard (10 March 1824 in Leipzig – 19 May 1906 in St. Louis, Missouri) was a German entomologist who specialised in Lepidoptera.

== Published works ==
- 1851–1853 Versuch einer Monographie der europäischen Schmetterlingsarten: Thecla, Polyomattus, Lycaena, Nemeobius; Mit colorirten Abbildungen Hamburg; Leipzig: W. Gerhard
