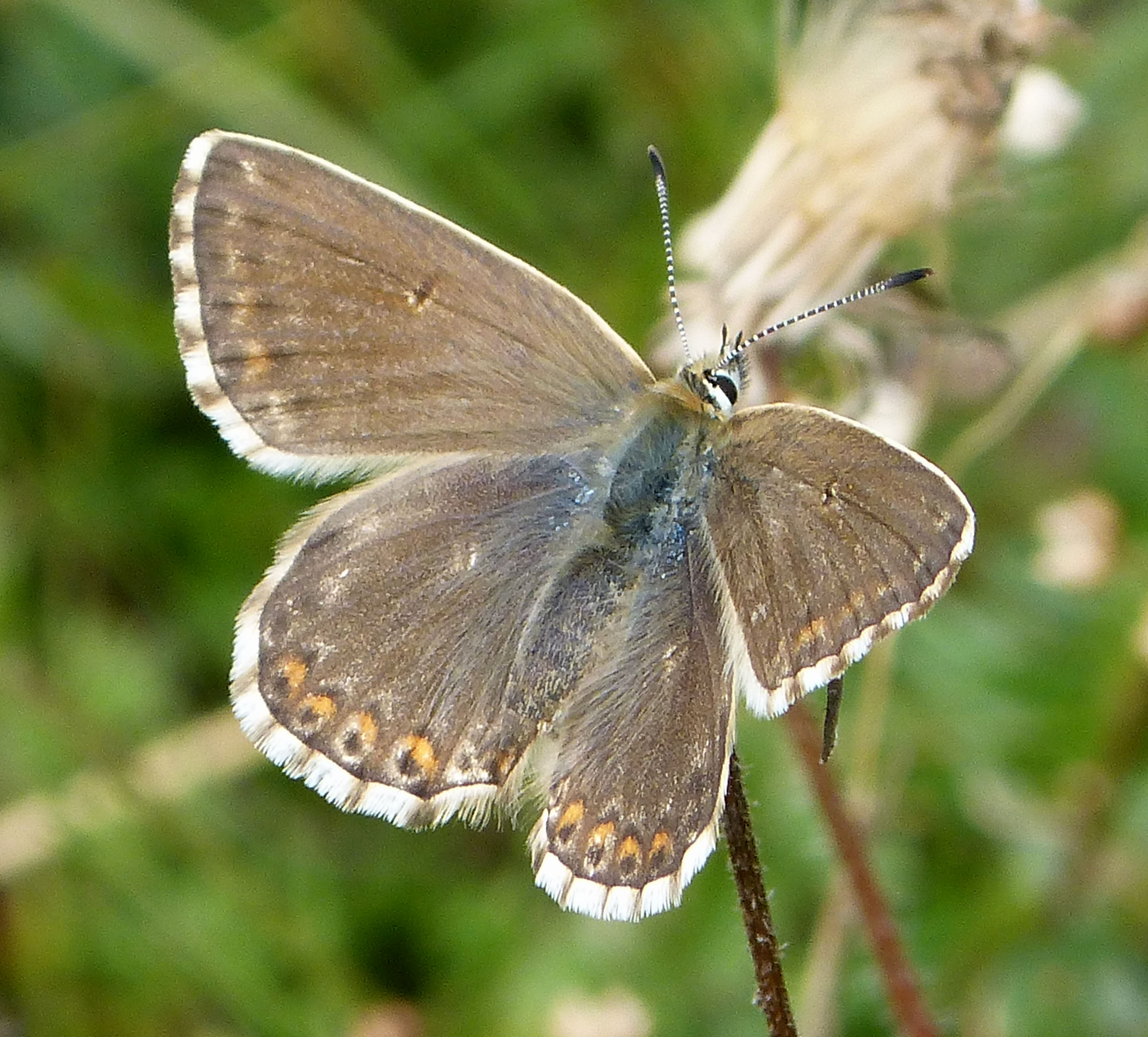
- Female L. coridon

Scientific classification
- Kingdom: Animalia
- Phylum: Arthropoda
- Class: Insecta
- Order: Lepidoptera
- Family: Lycaenidae
- Genus: Lysandra
- Species: L. coridon

Binomial name
- Lysandra coridon (Poda, 1761)

Synonyms
- Papilio coridon Poda, 1761; Polyommatus coridon (Poda, 1761); Lycaena coridon

= Chalkhill blue =

- Male L. coridon

Species of butterfly

The chalkhill blue (Lysandra coridon) is a butterfly in the family Lycaenidae. It is a small butterfly that can be found throughout the Palearctic realm, where it occurs primarily in grasslands rich in chalk. Males have a pale blue colour, while females are brown. Both have chequered fringes around their wings.

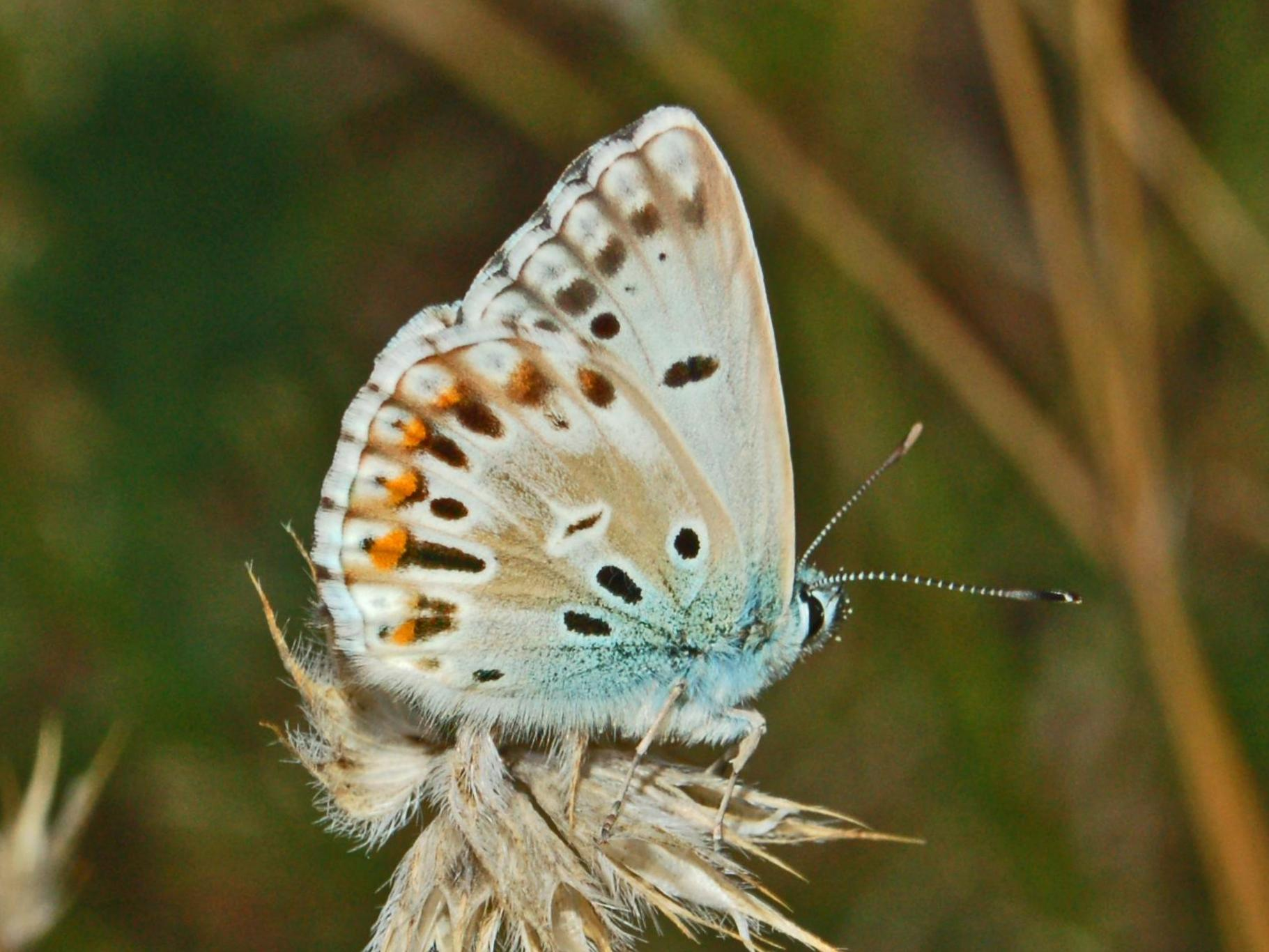
Aberrant male

== Subspecies ==
Subspecies include:

- Lysandra coridon coridon
- Lysandra coridon borussia (Dadd, 1908) – (Urals)
- Lysandra coridon asturiensis (Sagarra, 1922) – (Spain)

== Description ==
Lysandra coridon has a wingspan of 30–36 millimetres (1.2–1.4 in). These small butterflies present a sexual dimorphism. The males having pale silvery-blue upperside of the wings with a submarginal line of grey spots on the hindwings and a thin brown and white chequered fringe. Females have dark brown upperside of wings, with marginal orange spots and also with chequered fringes. The underside of the wings show a light ochre colouration, several dark spots surrounded by white, a submarginal line of black marks, a series of marginal orange spots on the hindwings and a blue dusting near the body.

As with many blue butterflies, separation from similar species in the field is on the underside markings. Aberrations are common.

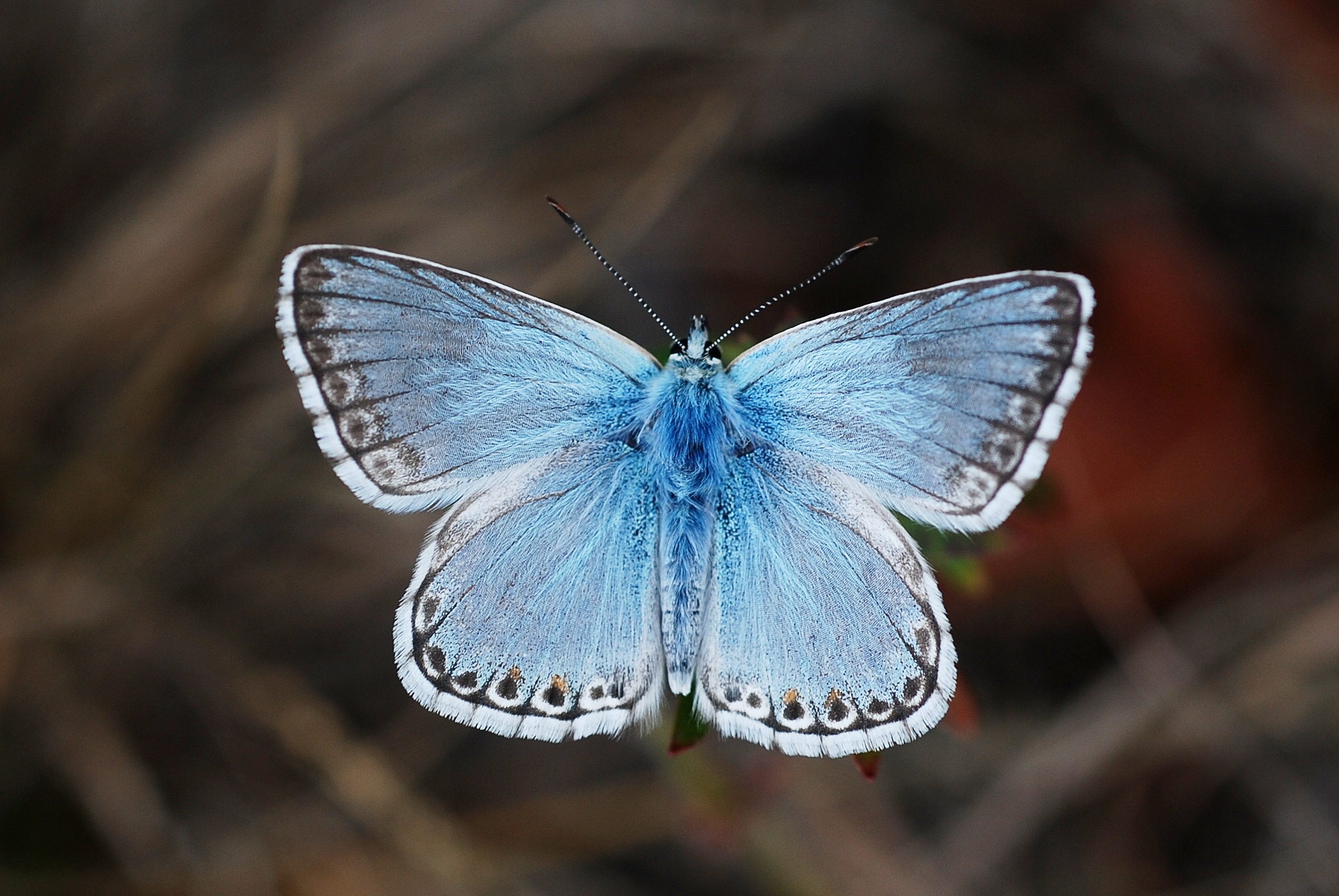
Male, upperside

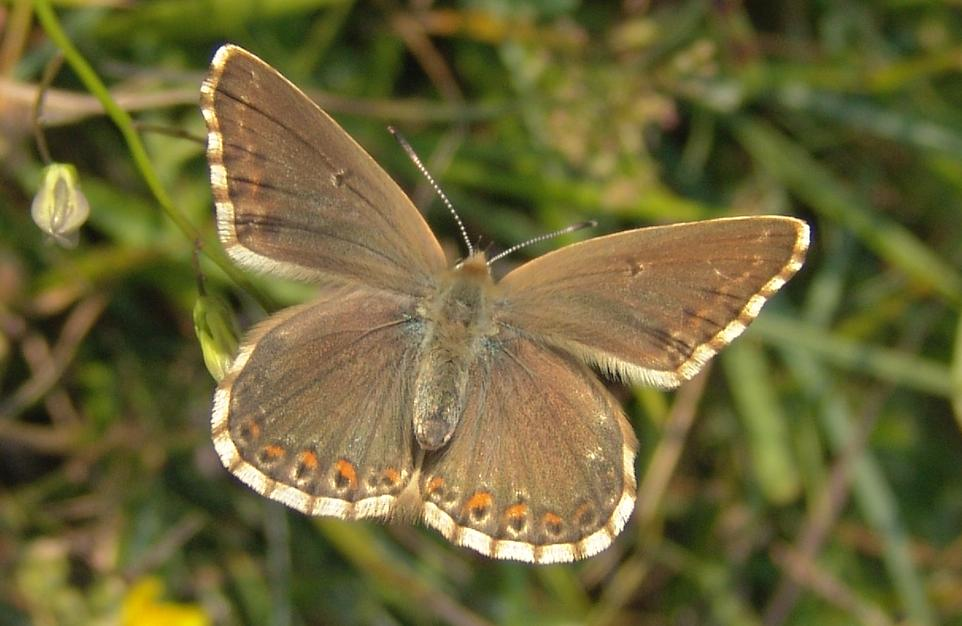
Female, upperside

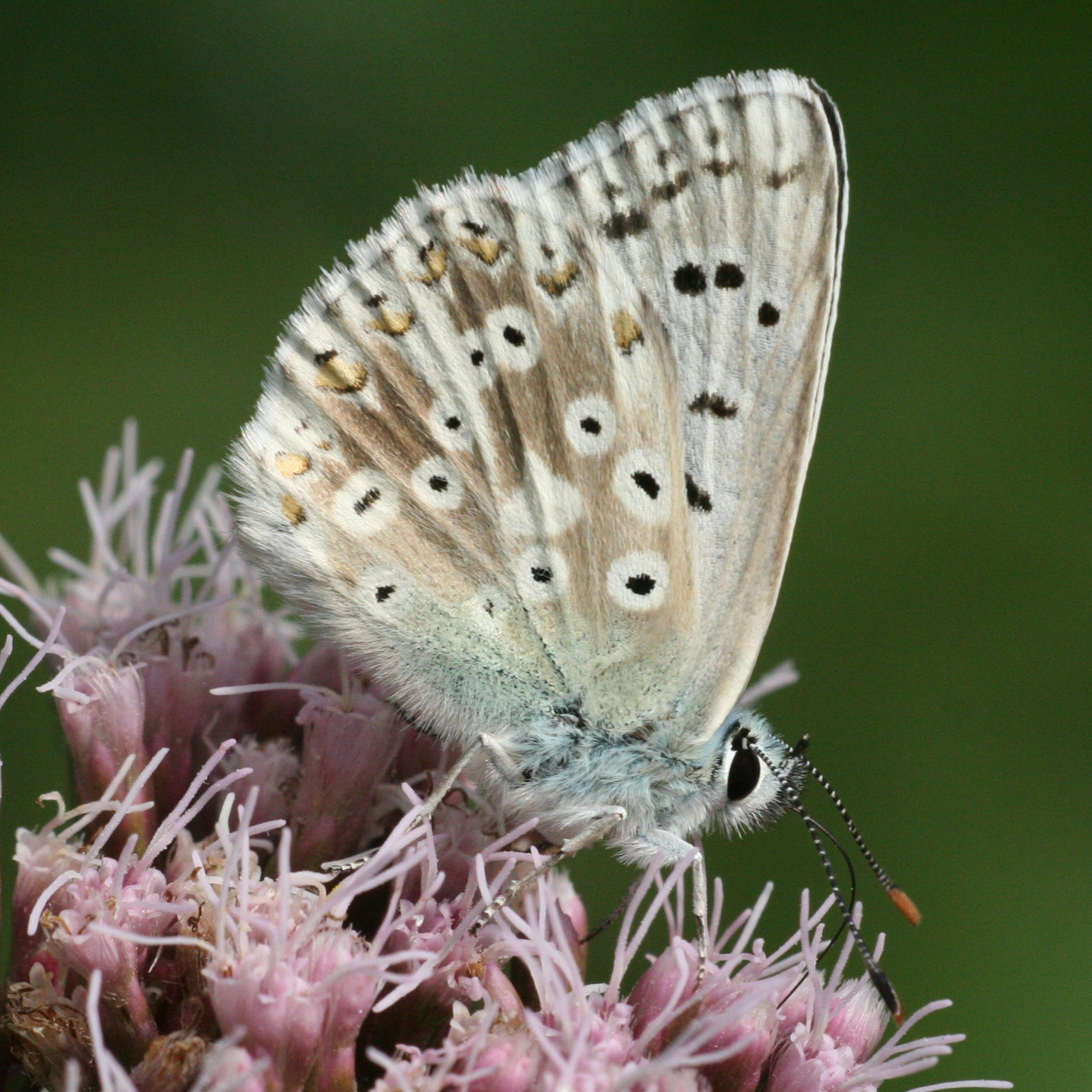
Male, underside

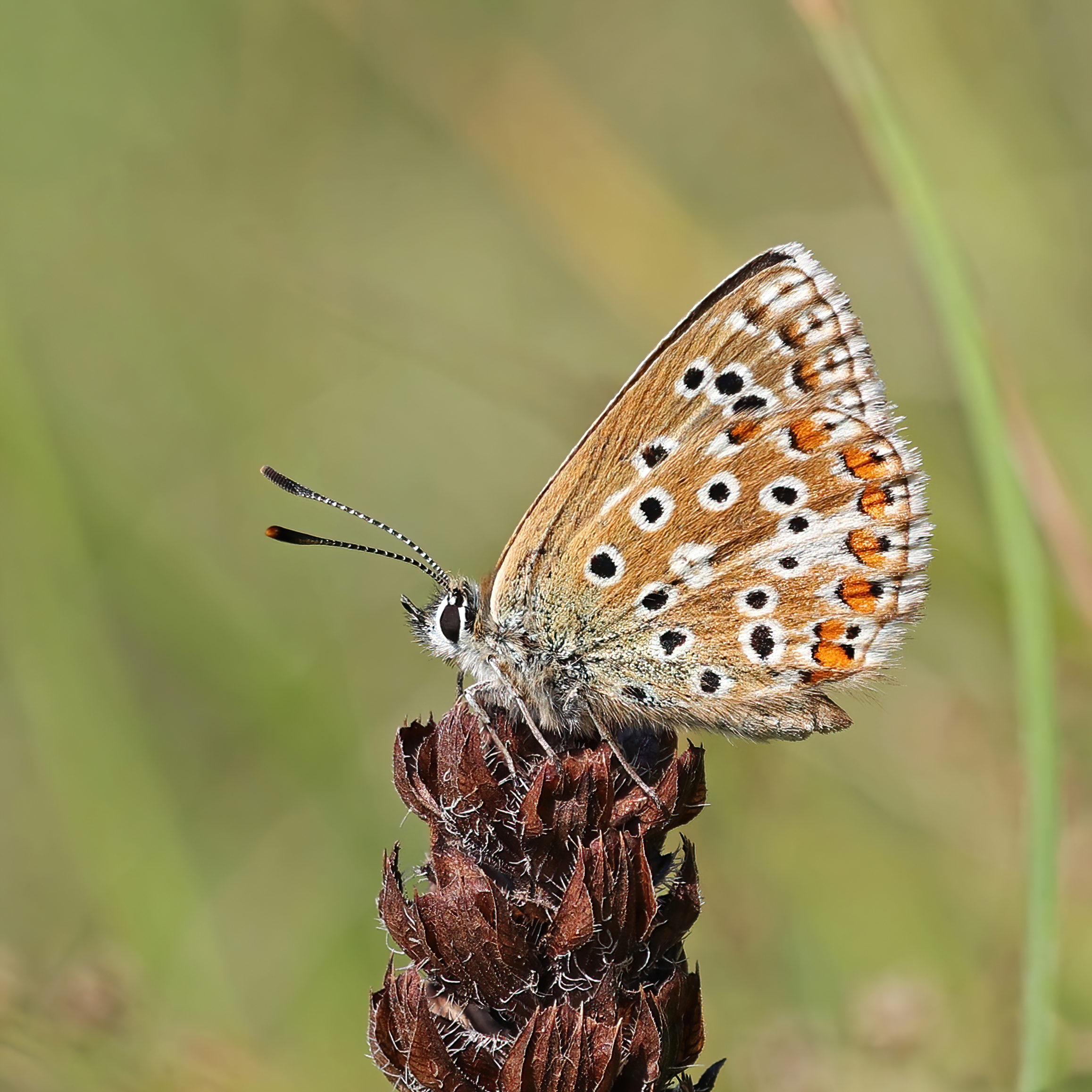
Female, underside

== Description in Seitz ==
L. coridon Poda (81 c, d). male above light blue green with a silvery glitter, the black margin of the forewing broad, the hindwing with dark dots at the margin. The underside light violet-grey on the fore- wing, brownish on the hindwing, variegated with white and bearing yellowish red submarginal spots; both wings very densely ornamented with ocelli. Female above russet grey-brown, beneath earth-brown and like the male with very numerous ocelli. The area of distribution is essentially smaller than in most Blues, being apparently entirely restricted to Central and South Europe. The species occurs from England, Pommerania, and St. Petersburg southwards to Spain. Italy and Brussa, and from the Pyrenees to Orenburg. Although the species is very uniformly developed, quite a number of forms have been provided with names, being partly based on very minute differences. We deal first with the variation of the upperside. — hispana H.-Schiff. (= arragonensis Gerh.),[ now Lysandra hispana (Herrich-Schäffer, [1851])] from Spain, is paler with the distal margin more strongly spotted. — apennina[ now Lysandra apennina (Zeller, 1847 ])(81 d) is on the whole paler, the dark marginal border of the forewing being lighter in consequence of an intermixture of the ground-colour; from Italy.The Greek form graeca Ruhl-Heine is quite similar. — rezniceki Bartel, [now L. hispana var. rezniceki Bartel, 1904] from Northern Italy, is a transition to the previous; according to the description the upperside of the males is still paler. — albicans H.-Schaff. [ now Lysandra albicans (Gerhard, 1851] (81 d) is the lightest form, which is almost white above; it flies on limestone in Spain, sometimes as the only form, sometimes in the company of hispana (Ribbe). — caucasica Led. (= ossmar Gerh.) [now Lysandra caucasica (Lederer, 1870)] (81 e) extends on to the Asiatic continent, flying in Armenia and at the Black Sea. The upperside of the male is brighter blue. — In specimens from the Taurus Mts. even a slight violet sheen is present, especiallv in the outer area of the wings; this is corydonius H.-Schaff. (= olympica Led.) (81 d).[ now Lysandra caucasica (Lederer, 1870)

— The blue colour of the male may occasionally appear also in the female, being sometimes restricted to the base — ab. semibrunnea Mill. (=semi-syngrapha Tutt) — sometimes occupying the whole upperside: ab. syngrapha Kef. (= mariscolore Gerh.). (81 d). On the other hand the blue upperside of males dulled by a grey suffusion: ab. suffusa Tutt. Other accidental forms are males with red spots at the margin above: ab. suavis Schultz, and females with such spots: ab. aurantia Tutt. In ab. inaequalis Tutt the glossy blue colour forms irregular streaks on a dark ground. In ab. marginata Tutt the black margin is broadened. In ab. fowleri South the margin is white instead of black, while in ab. punctata Tutt the margins are spotted. ab. calydonius Lowe has the ground darkened and the black borders enlarged. — Equally variable as the upperside is the under surface. The ground-cqjour beneath may be very dark (especially in certain females or remarkably pale; the latter is the case in ab. pallida Tutt. The ocelli may be distorted into rays: ab. striata Tutt. Some of the ocelli may be united: ab. tiphys Esp. They may be increased in number: ab. luxurians Courv., or they may be reduced (ab. privata, unipucta, impuncta) or all be absent: ab. cinnus Hbn. {= sohni Ruhl) (81 d). More over, all these variations may be more or less slightly developed or vestigial (ab. semiaurantia, caeruleomarginata, etc), or various aberrational characters may be combined in one individual, as for instance in ab. parisiensis Gerh., which is an ab. syngrapha with the ocelli as in ab. tiphys, etc.

— Egg greenish white, with minute pale reticulation, the meshes being hexagonal. Larva bright blue-green, beneath paler, the dorsal line appearing dark owing to the dorsal vessel, accompanied by chains of yellow spots, a similar but duller row of spots above the abdominal legs. Until June on Hippocrepis, Coronilla, Astragalus. Vicia, etc. Visited by Formica flava, which is attracted by the dorsal gland. Pupa rather slender, smooth, dirty yellowish brown, with dark dorsal line and on the wing-cases pale smears, free on the ground, often under stones. The butterflies occur from June till August, being rare in some places, exceedingly abundant in others; they are everywhere found in particular localities. They have a rapid flight, which is also more sustained than in most other Blues, and go early to sleep, settling for the night with closed wings on stalks of grass or on the top of flowers while it is yet full day-light. This offers the best opportunity for collecting aberrations, since the ocelli of the underside are so clearly visible that one can pick out without difficulty and put into the cyanide bottle what one requires.

=== Distribution ===
==== Geographical range ====
This species can be found in the Palearctic realm (western Europe, southern Europe, central Europe, Asia Minor, south Urals, and northwest Turan). The range of L. coridon occurs throughout Central Europe, and is endemic to Europe. There are a few exceptions to where it is located in Central Europe: it is not found in the countries of Ireland, Scotland, Scandinavia, the Netherlands, the Iberian Peninsula (except in its northern provinces), some Mediterranean islands (found in Corsica and Sardinia), and most of southern Italy.

==== Habitat ====
This particular species of butterfly has a preference for dry calcareous grasslands, at an elevation of 100–2,000 metres (330–6,560 ft) above sea level. This species also has a preference towards grasslands that have short grass with many flowering plants. L. coridon is a sedentary organism which means that they do not travel very far within their habitat range. These individuals have the tendency to stay within their habitat patch rather than perform long migrations to find new habitats.

=== Biology ===
Note that information in this section applies to Great Britain and some details may not be consistent with the species in other parts of its range.

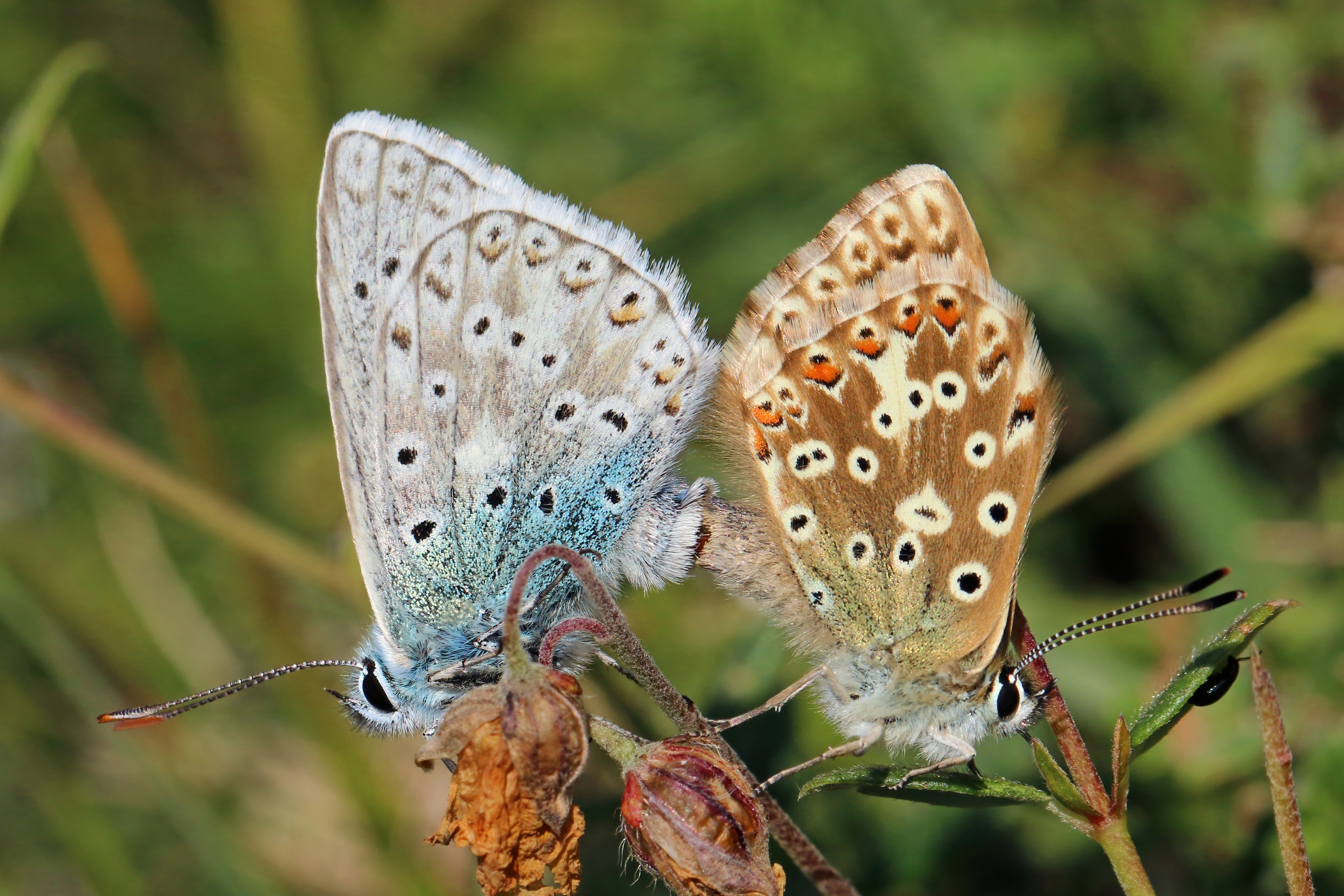
Mating

This species only produces one generation per year making them a univoltine, which means that this species only breeds once per year and will only produce one set of offspring.

L. coridon is monophagous, which means that they only feeds on one specific species of plant. The larvae or caterpillars of this species feed on the leaves of horseshoe vetch (Hippocrepis comosa).

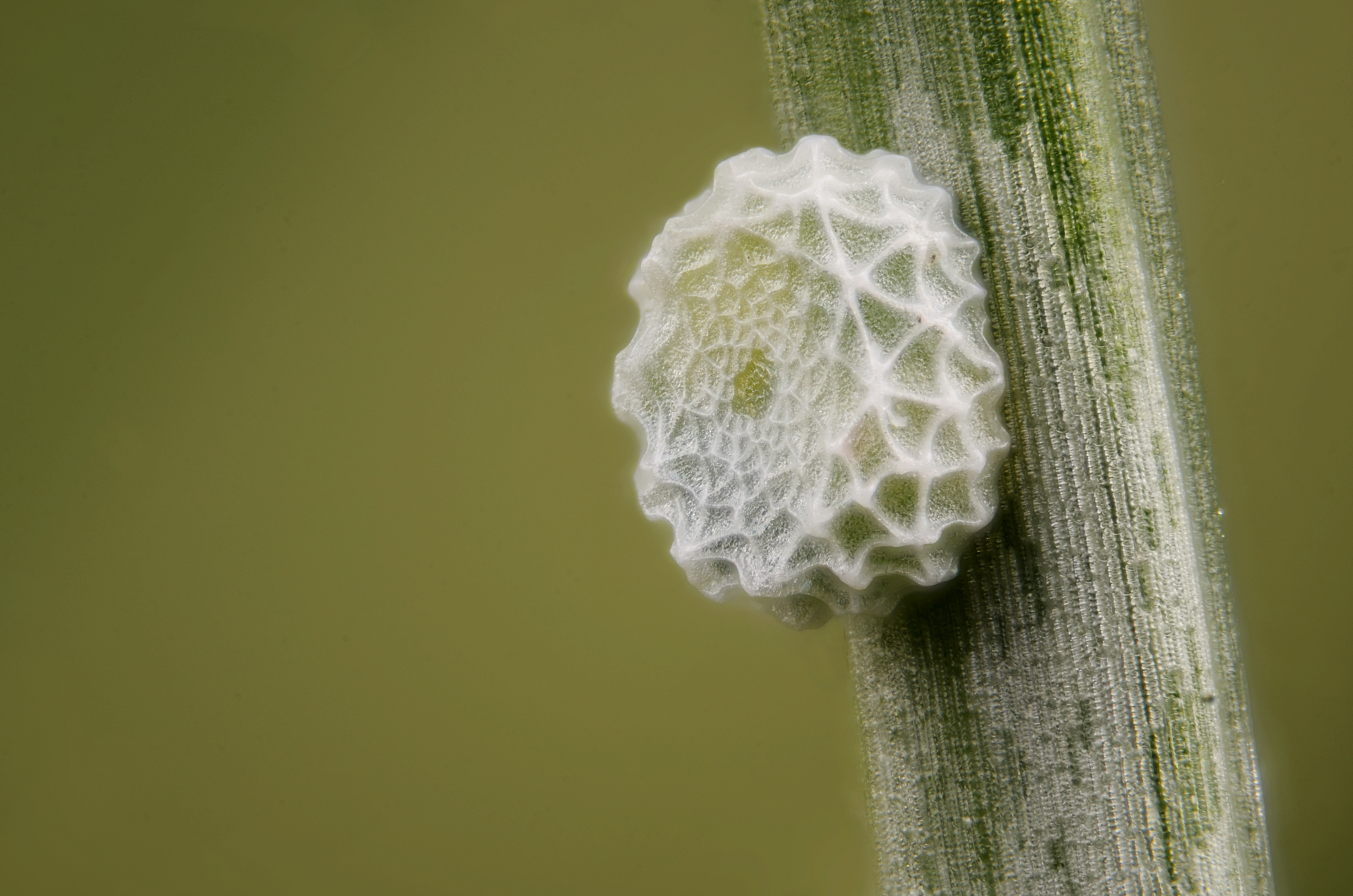
Egg

When they are ready they pupate on the ground within the leaf litter of the host plants.

The caterpillars are attended by several different ants of the genera Myrmica, Lasius, Formica, Plagiolepis, Tetramorium, Aphaenogaster and Tapinoma.

This butterfly is usually seen on the wing from June to October.

In the research into the effects of trophic interaction and fragmentation it was found that there are no known parasitoids that are specialized to this species, but there are other parasitoids that are related to other species that are part of the family Lycaenidae which will sometimes predate this species. It could be a viable option that the parasitoids that did predate upon this species became extinct due to the fragmentation of their habitat in the past.

== Evolution ==
=== Sibling species ===
Upon using allozyme analyses when looking at the species L. hispana and L. slovacus showed a difference in evolutionary history with L. coridon. The analysis showed that L. hispana has a large genetic distance between the two species and that there was allopatric speciation from L. coridon. L. slovacus seems to show that there was sympatry with L. coridon but the genetic analysis could not prove this hypothesis, so the researchers made the conclusion that this particular species was a local population that has an atavism of bivoltinism.

=== Post-glacial expansion ===
The expansion of the species travels from western Europe into eastern Europe from the ice-age refugium into the Balkans. The starting point for the expansion is in western Hungary traveling into the Balkans and then into Brandenburg and Poland. This expansion shows that are two routes due to the changes in gene allele frequencies and the degree of homogeneity of the species.

The two routes are:

1.) Starting in the western tip of Hungary traveling into north-eastern Hungry along the Hungarian Mountains into eastern Slovakia

2.) Starts in western Hungary and travels along the eastern Alps into western Slovakia and Czech Republic

The expansion caused there to be two unique genetic populations that were separated by mountain ranges. And the expansion also caused the movement of species that were only found in warmer areas to move into new habitats that were previously cooler in temperature and did not have the biotic components to support these new species.

== Factors that affect genetic diversity ==
=== Habitat fragmentation ===
This would be physical features of the environment that separate populations of the same species. One type of would be mountain ranges which separate west and east population of L. coridon, and this separation causes there to be changes in the allele frequency of both population and there can be mixing of these populations only when there is an area that is connected.

Another type would be the loss of habitat which can lead to large habitat areas being fragmented, this loss can occur due to human interaction with the ecosystem in way that isolates populations of the species. The loss of habitat changes the number of individuals that the area can support or blocks the population off from a larger population. The limiting number of individuals in the population or the isolation can cause a decrease in the heterogeneity of population and leads to a decrease in fitness.

Habitat fragmentation causes conservation efforts to be difficult because it has to be decided what areas get protect or have the best possible chance of helping increase a population without damaging the overall fitness of the population, so great care is taken when selecting what areas will be protected.

== Status and conservation ==
=== Status ===
According to IUCN Red List for Threatened Species, this particular species is of Least Concern, and this is due to this species not having a significant decline in population in the last ten years, which would be a decline by 25% in the number of adults.

=== Conservation ===
Since this species is of Least Concern there are few conservation efforts being put forth. But in certain areas that have been having large decline or had large decline implemented conservation efforts. This species is considered by researchers to be an indicator species of calcareous grassland habitat quality and could also be a good model organism to help develop conservation programs for more At Risk species.

==== Conservation in the United Kingdom, Germany, and Poland ====
All three countries have done research into the conservation of the calcareous grassland. Protecting this species would also lead to helping protect higher trophic level individuals that are located in this ecosystem.

===== United Kingdom =====
The chalkhill blue experienced a significant decline in population number in the 1950s. There was a rise in population between 1981 and 2000. In this time period there was a significant increase in numbers and this led to the stabilization of the population in the 1990s. The UK Biodiversity Action Plan had monitoring plans in place to see these changes and the data that was collected during that time period showed that the increase in population number came from the use of controlling grazing levels, conservation designation, and agri-environment schemes entry and management. These practices improved the quality of the habitats that were located in the United Kingdom.

===== Germany and Poland =====
Both Germany and Poland came up with action plans such as that if conservation efforts where to take place that the ideal area for protection would be large habitats that were interconnected with other Grassland habitats that were fragmented, and had a high abundance of the juvenile host plant located within it or had the ability to support a large number of plants.

== Bibliography ==
- D.J. Carter (ill. B. Hargreaves), Guide des chenilles d'Europe, Paris, Delachaux & Niestlé, 2001 (ISBN 978-2-603-00639-9)
- Emmet, A.M. (1990) Lysandra coridon (Poda). Pages 160-162 in The Moths and Butterflies of Great Britain and Ireland Vol. 7 Part 1 (ed. A.M. Emmet and J. Heath). Harley Books, Colchester, UK.
- LepIndex: The Global Lepidoptera Names Index. Beccaloni G.W., Scoble M.J., Robinson G.S. & Pitkin B.
- Tom Tolman et Richard Lewington, Guide des papillons d'Europe et d'Afrique du Nord, Delachaux et Niestlé, 1997 (ISBN 978-2-603-01649-7)
- Tomlinson, D. and R. Still (2002) Britain's Butterflies. WildGuides, Old Basing, UK.

== See also ==
- List of butterflies of Great Britain
