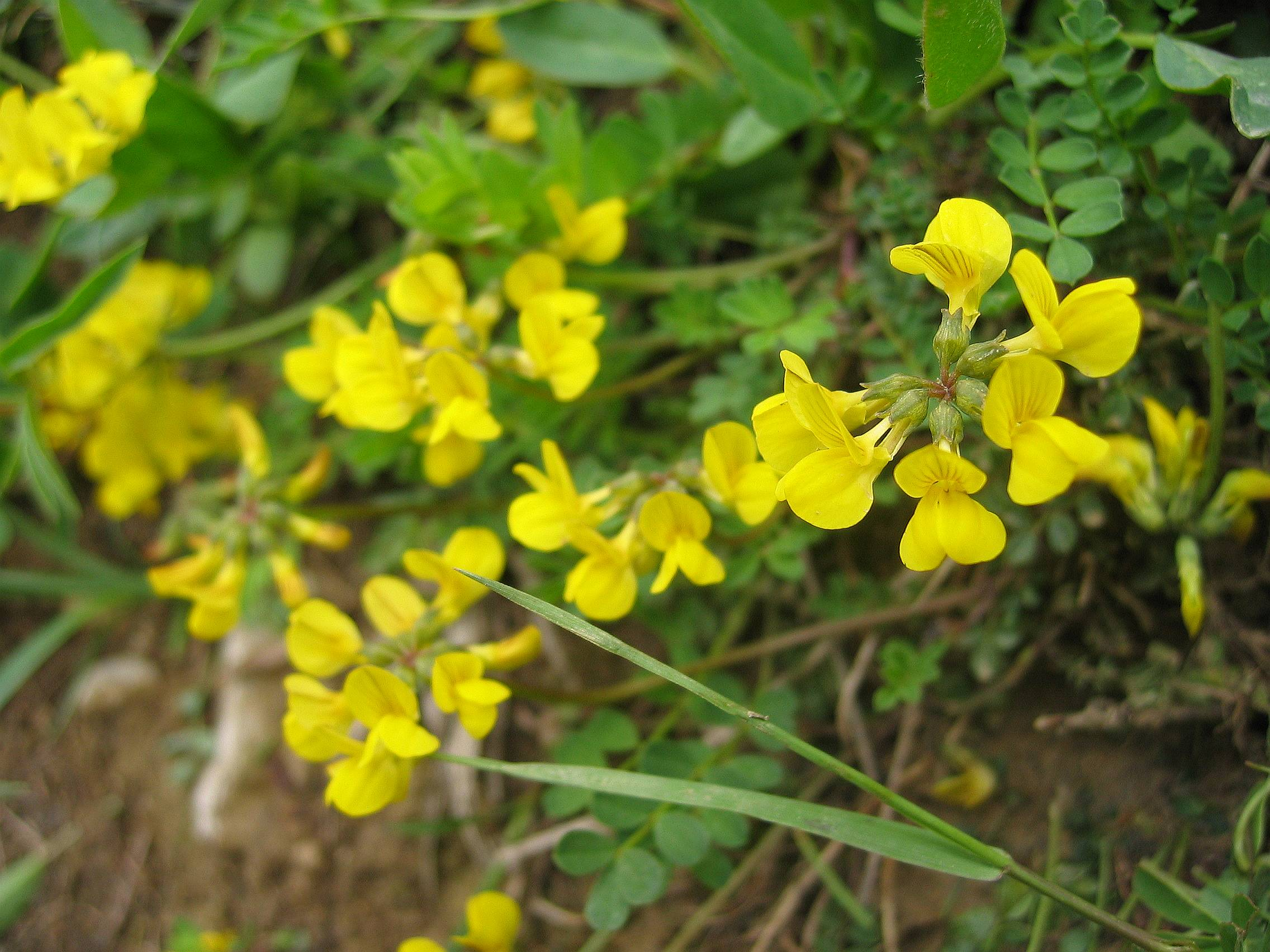

Scientific classification
- Kingdom: Plantae
- Clade: Tracheophytes
- Clade: Angiosperms
- Clade: Eudicots
- Clade: Rosids
- Order: Fabales
- Family: Fabaceae
- Subfamily: Faboideae
- Genus: Hippocrepis
- Species: H. comosa

Binomial name
- Hippocrepis comosa L.

= Hippocrepis comosa =

Species of legume

Hippocrepis comosa, the horseshoe vetch, is a species of perennial flowering plant belonging to the genus Hippocrepis in the family Fabaceae.

== Description ==
The overall appearance depends on its habitat: sometimes it forms upright clumps of flowers; at other times, it sends prostrate leafy runners over a wide area; sometimes it distributes itself as single flowers. The flowers are small, yellow or sometimes orange/red (becoming yellow as they mature), and of typical shape for the family Fabaceae: these appear for a period of two weeks around May..

== Propagation ==
The rate of seed production is variable: relatively low and sometimes negligible seed production. Seedlings remain the predominant method of extending its range. It has a low germination rate in the wild, although this can be improved in nurseries.

== Distribution ==
Hippocrepis comosa is found in the UK, predominantly in the south..

== Habitat ==
Hippocrepis comosa is a calciole (found only on chalk and limestone). It is a hardy plant that survives long periods of cold winters and dry summers years after year. Colonies are not harmed by sheep grazing, and are resistant to moderate trampling; they do not thrive after heavy ploughing or disturbance of the ground. In areas grazed by cattle they disappear, sometimes after several years (depending on grazing intensity.)

== Ecology and butterflies ==
Hippocrepis comosa is the exclusive food plant of the caterpillars of chalkhill blue (Polyommatus coridon) and Adonis blue (Polyommatus bellargus) butterflies. Populations that support such butterflies occur on longstanding ungrazed meadows, quarries, edges of paths and wasteland; outside of southern England and the Midlands (e.g. the Gower and Yorkshire populations) the climate is unsuitable for the butterflies.

Re-establishment of a colony of H. comosa is best attempted by planting individual plants: direct sowing has poor rates of success. Even this however offers no guarantee of a permanent colony (within a period as long as 20 years) and even less likelihood that the new plants will be used by significant populations of chalkhill blue butterflies within another 50 years.
