= Brighton and Hove =

City in East Sussex, England

Brighton and Hove City of Brighton and Hove
- City and unitary authority
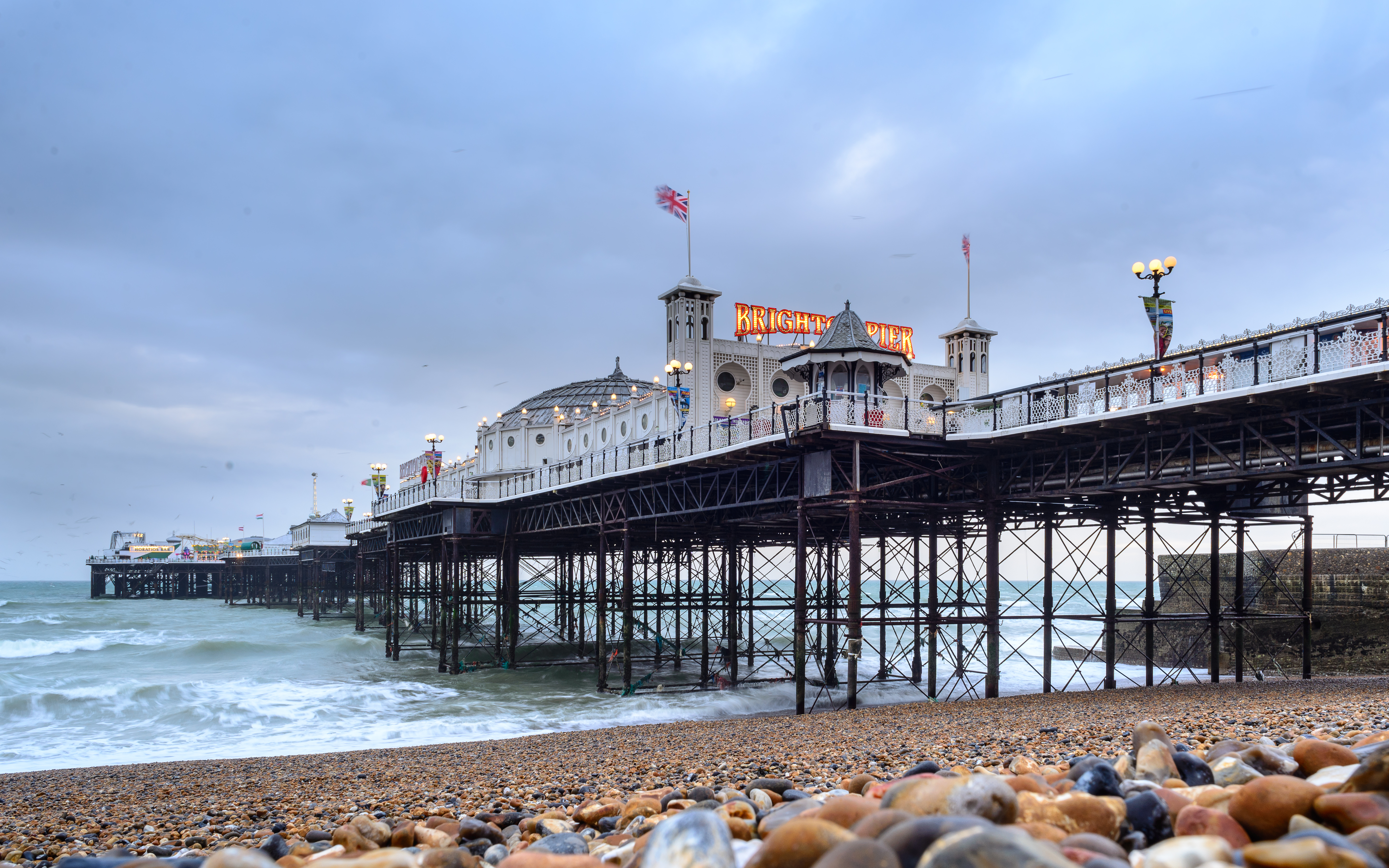
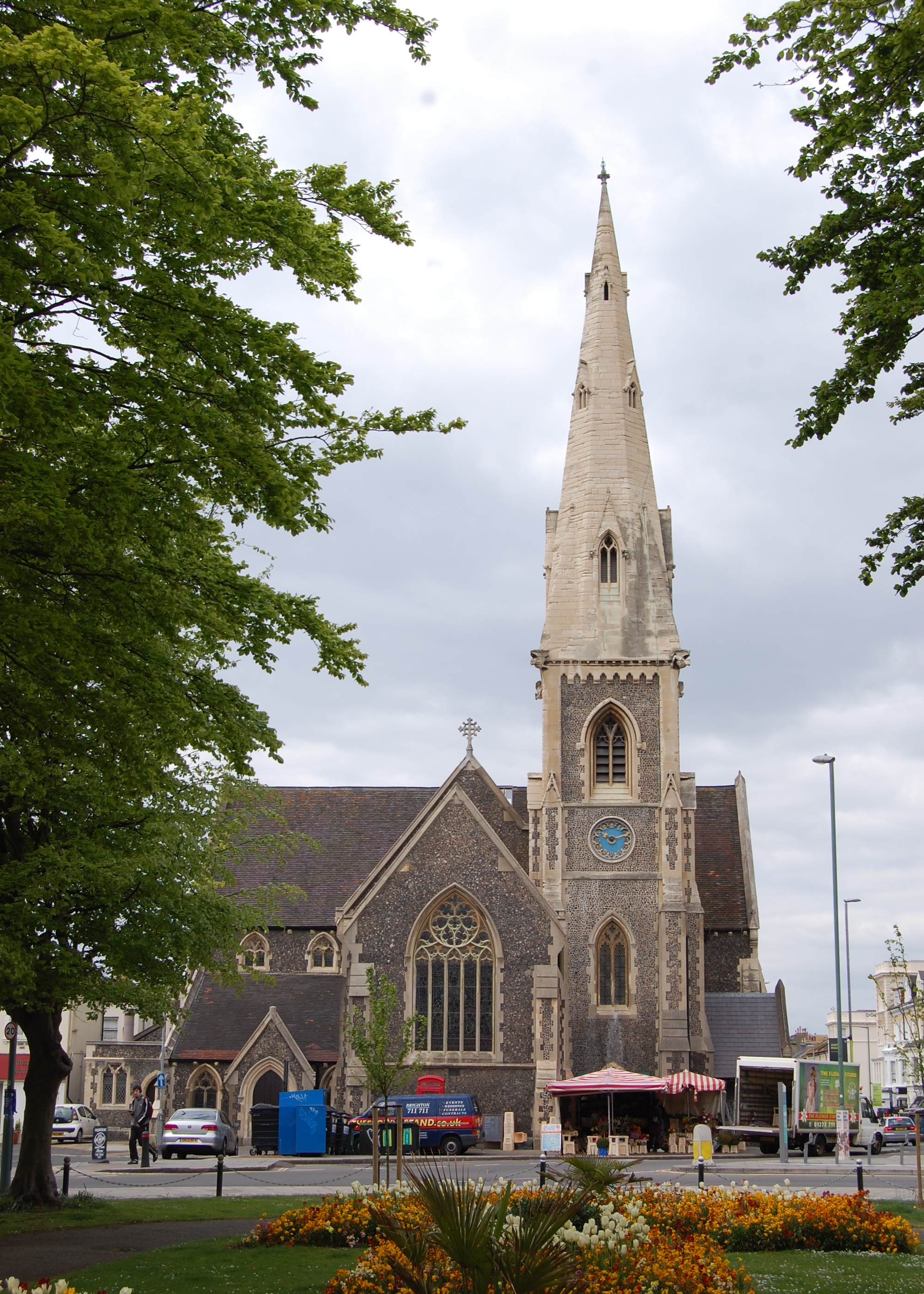
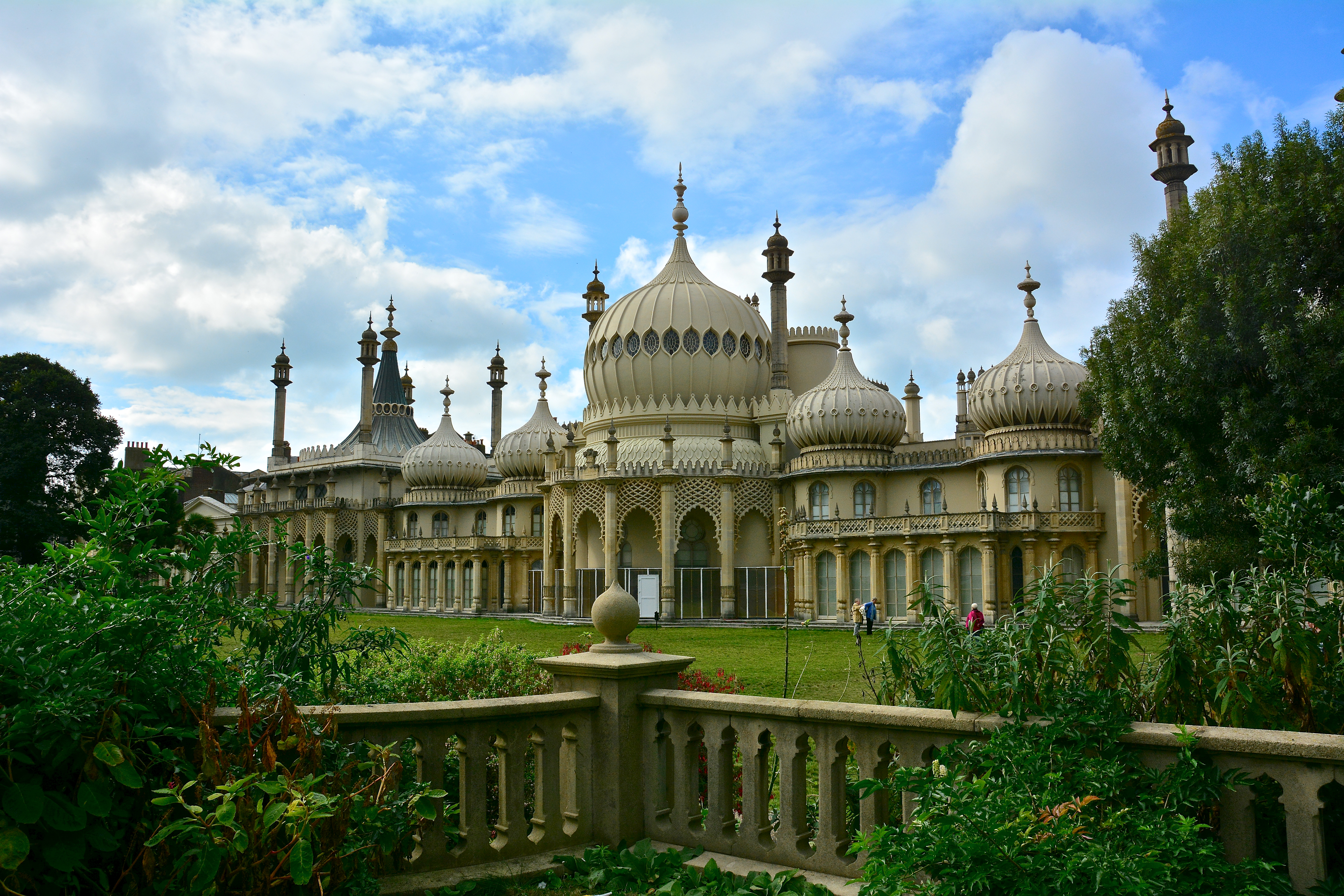
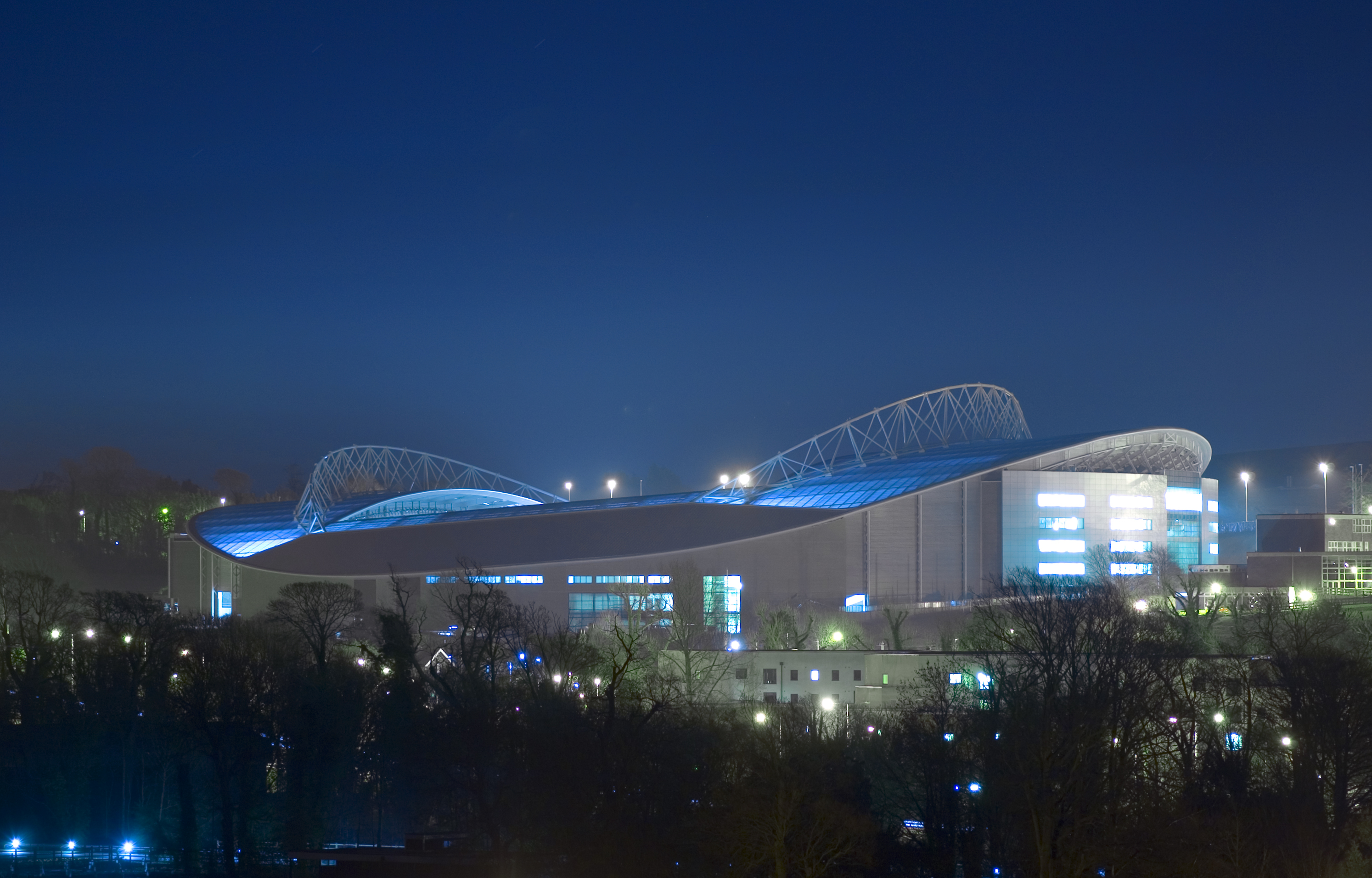
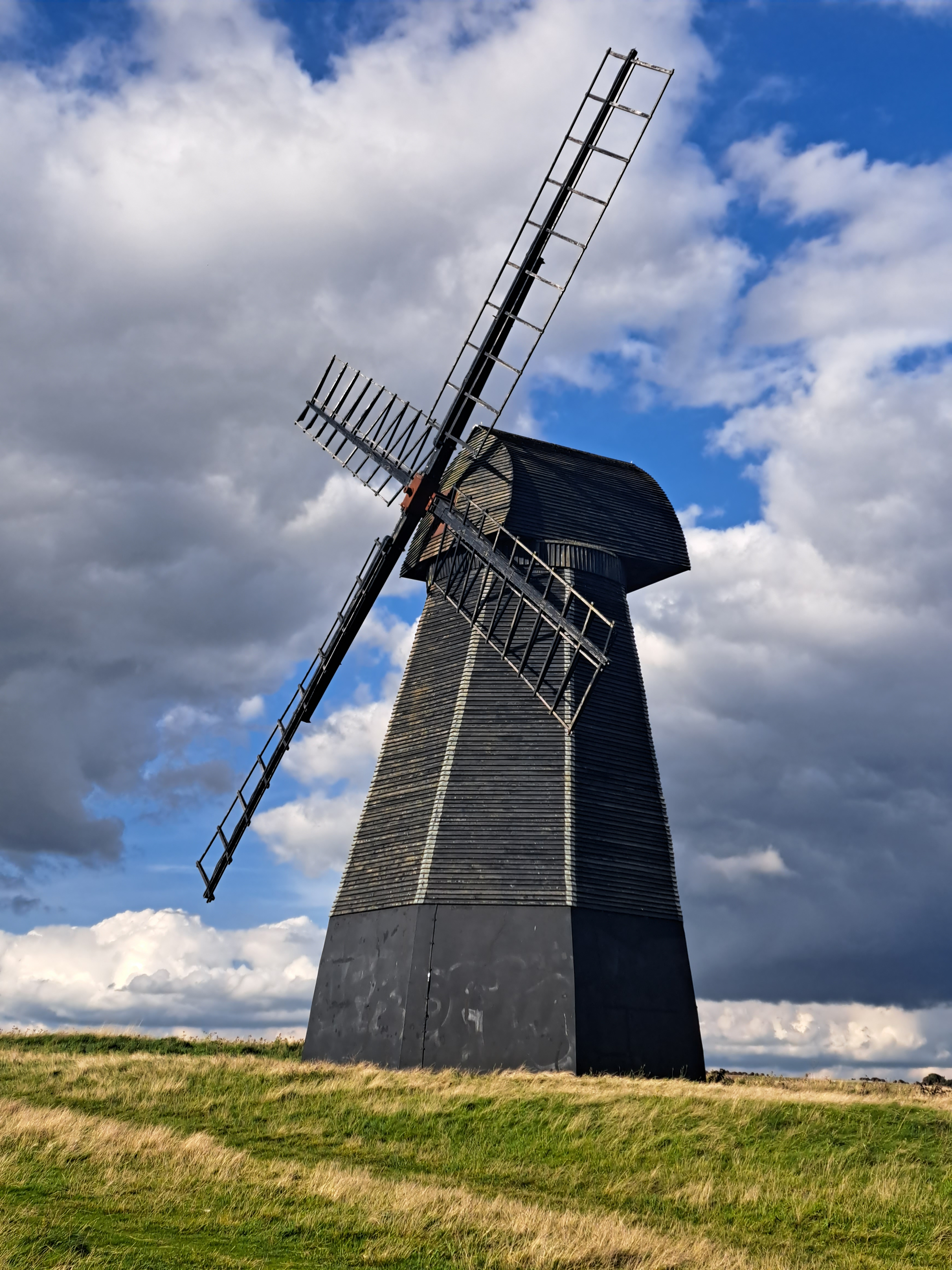
- From top, left to right: Brighton Palace Pier; St John the Baptist's Church; the Royal Pavilion; Falmer Stadium; Rottingdean Windmill

- Coat of arms

- Brighton and Hove shown within East Sussex and England

- Location of Brighton and Hove Brighton and Hove (Europe)
- Coordinates: 50°49′40″N 0°09′10″W
- Sovereign state: United Kingdom
- Country: England
- Region: South East England
- Historic county: Sussex
- Ceremonial county: East Sussex
- Administrative seat: Hove
- Established: 1 April 1997
- City status: 31 January 2001

Government
  - Type: Unitary authority
  - Body: Brighton and Hove City Council
  - Governance: Committee system (L)
  - Executive: Labour
  - Leader: Bella Sankey
  - Mayor: Amanda Grimshaw
  - MPs: Peter Kyle (L); Siân Berry (G); Chris Ward (L)

Area
  - City and unitary authority: 32 sq mi (83 km^{2})
  - Urban: 34.5 sq mi (89.4 km^{2})
  - Rank: 211th

Population (2025)
  - City and unitary authority: 284,170
  - Rank: 60th
  - Density: 8,890/sq mi (3,431/km^{2})
  - Urban: 474,485 (15th)
  - Urban density: 13,740/sq mi (5,304/km^{2})
  - Metro: 769,000 (15th)

Ethnicity (2021)
  - Ethnic groups: List: 85.4% White; 4.8% Mixed; 4.8% Asian; 3.1% other; 2% Black

Religion (2021)
  - Religion: List: 55.2% no religion; 30.9% Christianity; 7.1% not stated; 3.1% Islam; 1% other; 0.9% Buddhism; 0.9% Judaism; 0.8% Hinduism; 0.1% Sikhism
- Time zone: UTC±0 (Greenwich Mean Time)
  - Summer (DST): UTC+1 (British Summer Time)
- Postcode areas: BN (1, 2, 3, 41)
- ONS code: 00ML (ONS); E06000043 (GSS)
- ISO 3166-2: GB-BNH
- Website: brighton-hove.gov.uk

Brighton and Hove (/ˈbraɪtən ... ˈhoʊv/ BRY-tən … HOHV) is a city and unitary authority area, ceremonially in East Sussex, England. There are multiple villages alongside the seaside resorts of Brighton and Hove in the district. It is administered by Brighton and Hove City Council, which is currently under Labour majority control.

The two resorts, along with Worthing and Littlehampton in West Sussex, make up the second most-populous built-up area of South East England, after South Hampshire. In 2014, Brighton and Hove City Council and other nearby councils formed the Greater Brighton City Region local enterprise partnership area.

== Unification ==
In 1992, a government commission was set up to conduct a structural review of local government arrangements across England. In its draft proposals for East Sussex, the commission suggested two separate unitary authorities be created for the towns of Brighton and Hove, with the latter authority to include Hove, Worthing and the Adur District. Support within Brighton for its own unitary authority was high, however respondents in Hove expressed reservations towards a merger with Worthing and Adur. A report following consultation noted that more than 25% of respondents in both Brighton and Hove had "unprompted, indicated support for a merger of those two areas." Although this option had not been included in the draft proposals, subsequent polling indicated that the merger was the most popular option among residents.

Nevertheless, the proposal of a merger proved controversial, particularly in Hove. Hove Borough Council opposed the move on the grounds that Brighton would dominate affairs in the city, and the commission acknowledged that residents of Hove "have significant negative feelings towards Brighton" and greater identification towards Sussex. Ultimately, the view was taken that support for a single tier of government in both towns outweighed opposition to unification, and as a result the commission recommended that the borough councils of Brighton and Hove be made a single unitary authority independent of East Sussex County Council. In 1997, Brighton and Hove Borough Council was formed, and assumed responsibility for all matters of local government across both towns.

Twenty years earlier, as part of the Queen's Silver Jubilee celebrations, Brighton had been shortlisted as a candidate for city status, though eventually lost out to larger Derby. Following unification of the towns, Brighton and Hove applied for city status again as part of the Millennium City Status Competition, and was subsequently granted city status on 31 January 2001. As a result, the borough council became a city council.

Although the city now operates as a single entity, locals generally still consider Brighton and Hove to be separate settlements with different identities. Hove is largely residential and has its own distinct seafront and established town centre located around George Street, while Brighton has a higher profile as the country's most popular seaside resort, a significant digital economy, and hosts several festivals of national prominence. Recognition of the city's twin identities is evident from the continued popularity of the local saying "Hove, actually", a phrase which long predates unification.

Some organisations such as the local football club, Brighton and Hove Albion, and the bus company Brighton & Hove, predate the unification of the towns by several decades.

In 2014, Brighton and Hove formed the Greater Brighton City Region with neighbouring local authorities.

== Areas ==
Downland and seafront areas in Brighton and Hove

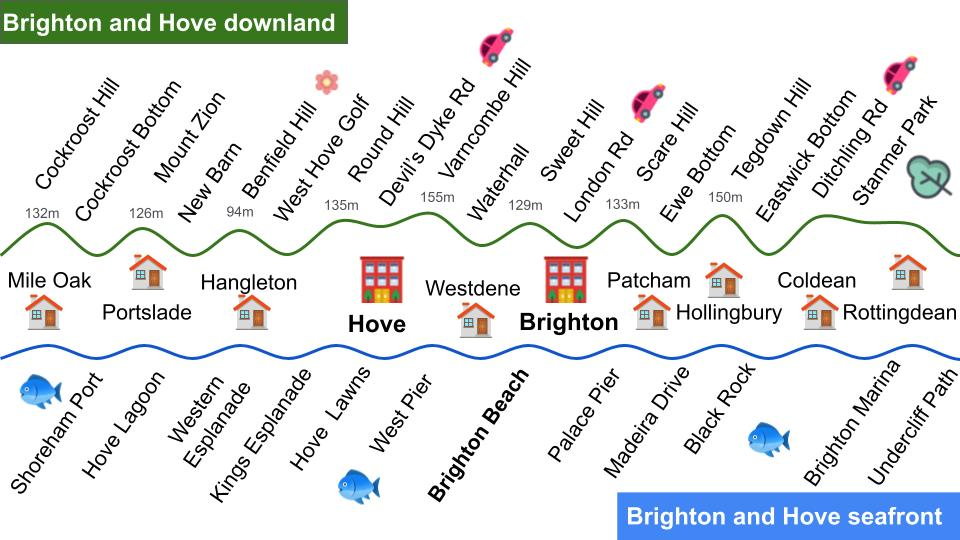
Brighton and Hove, the downland and coastal city in the South Downs National Park

=== Brighton ===
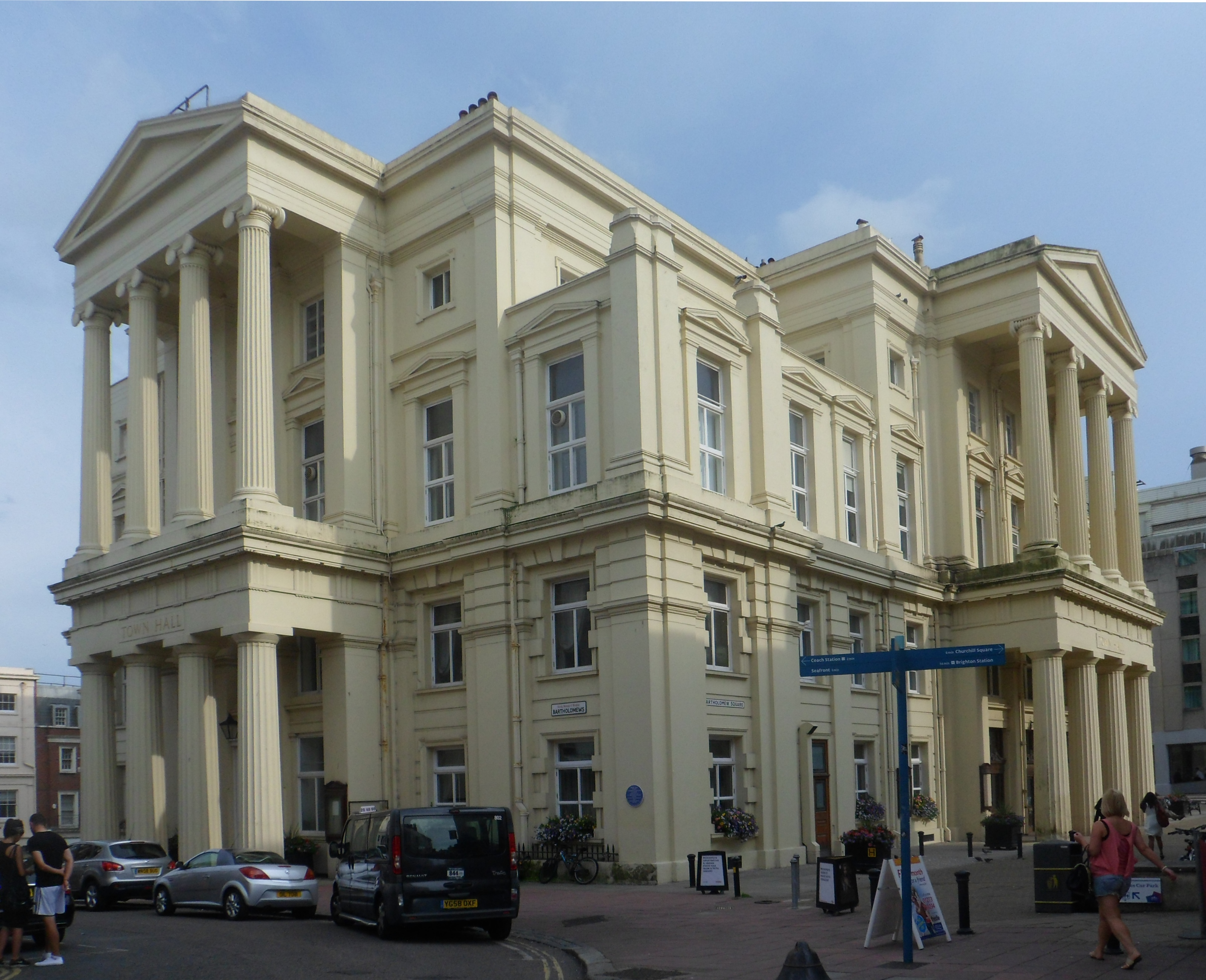
Brighton Town Hall at Bartholomews in The Lanes

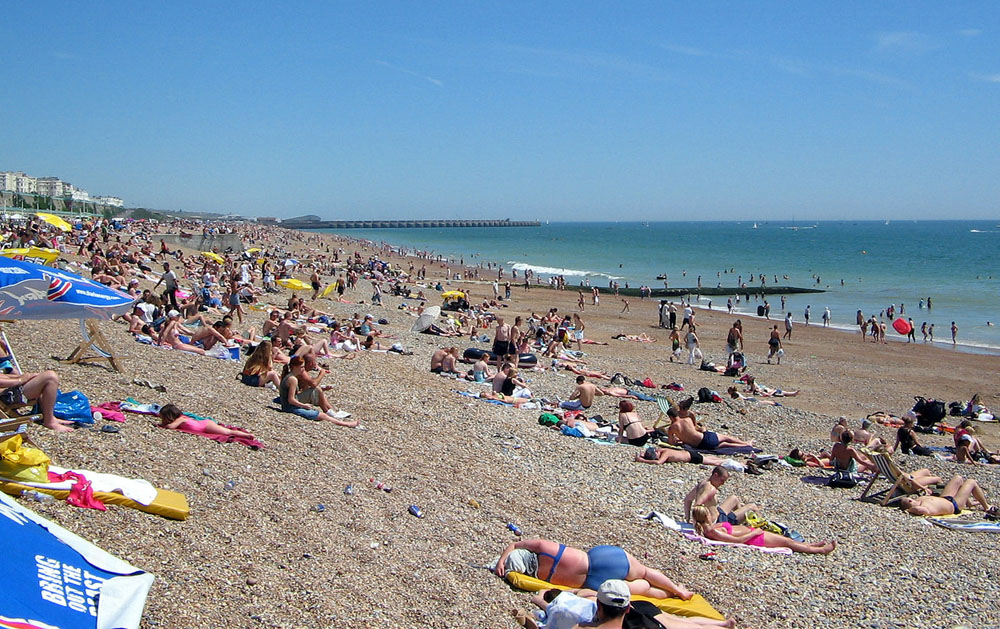
Brighton beach

Brighton has been the most populous settlement in Sussex since at least the 17th century, and a town hall and evidence of citizen's control over town affairs predates 1580. The original parish of Brighton covered what is today much of central Brighton. The parish border ran from Little Western Street and Boundary Passage in the west, to Whitehawk Road in the east, and roughly followed the Old Shoreham Road and Bear Road to the north. The Reform Act 1832 created the parliamentary constituency of Brighton. Brighton obtained a royal charter for incorporation in 1854 and was organised into six wards: Park, Pavilion, Pier, St Nicholas, St Peter, and West. The ward of Preston was added in 1873, expanding Brighton to the north. In 1889 Brighton attained county borough status.

The Brighton Corporation Act 1927 added the settlements of Ovingdean and Rottingdean, as well as western parts of Falmer, Patcham and West Blatchington. These reforms expanded Brighton north and west dramatically. Between 1920 and 1950, housing estates were developed in Woodingdean, Moulsecoomb, Bevendean, and Whitehawk, increasing the population of the town substantially. As a result, the number of wards had by now increased to 19. The rest of Falmer, Coldean and the parish of Stanmer were added to Brighton by the Brighton Extension Act 1951, completing the northward extension of the town. A final expansion of the town's boundaries was approved in 1968, incorporating reclaimed land from the sea for the Brighton Marina project.

Brighton was split into two parliamentary constituencies in 1950. The first, Brighton Pavilion, covers the centre and north of the town. The second, Brighton Kemptown, covers the east of the town. The latter has since expanded further east to include the neighbouring towns of East Saltdean, Telscombe Cliffs, and Peacehaven, all of which are administratively within the adjacent Lewes District. Brighton became a municipal borough as a result of the Local Government Act 1972, losing unitary control of town affairs to East Sussex County Council. This reform was later followed by a reduction of wards to 16 in 1983. Brighton Borough Council remained under this structure until unification with Hove.

=== Hove ===
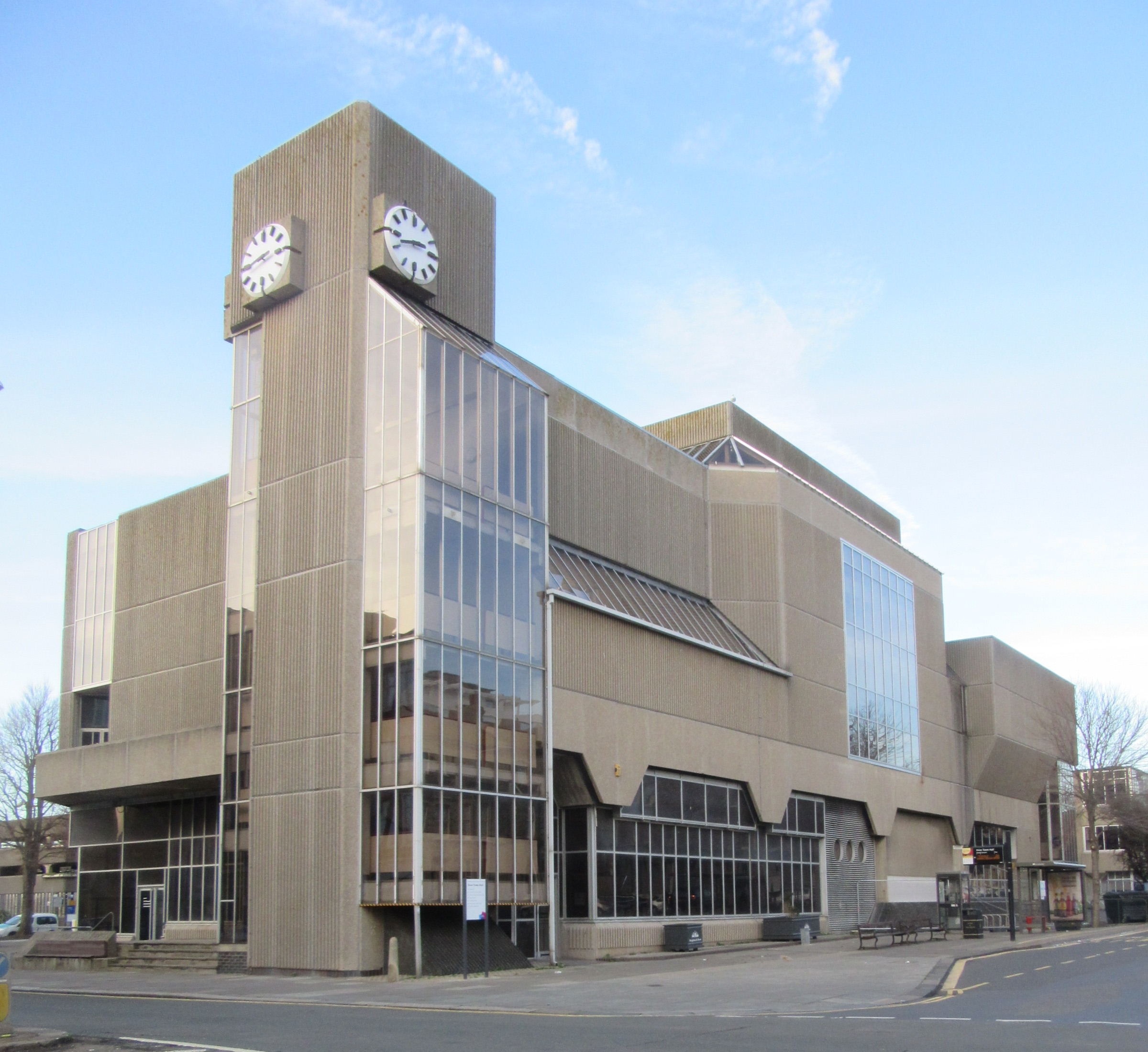
Hove Town Hall on Church Road

A small parish at the end of the 18th century, Hove began to expand in the early 19th century alongside the westward development of Brighton, and in 1832 became incorporated into the parliamentary constituency of Brighton. In 1873 commissioners from Hove, West Hove and Brunswick were amalgamated as means to guard against the dominance of Brighton. The first public buildings were completed in the late 19th century, including the original town hall in 1882. The parish of Aldrington was annexed by Hove in 1893. A municipal borough of Hove was formed by royal charter in 1889, granting Hove administrative autonomy. Further expansion took place in 1927, with the addition of the parishes of Preston Rural and Hangleton and westerly sections of West Blatchington and Patcham. Hove gained its own parliamentary constituency in 1950. The Local Government Act 1972 abolished the remaining parishes of Hove, Aldrington and Hangleton and West Blatchington to form the unparished non-metropolitan district of Hove. It also incorporated the nearby town of Portslade-by-Sea into the new district. The new boundaries established by the Act remained largely the same until unification with Brighton a quarter of a century later.

=== Portslade, Portslade Village, and Mile Oak ===
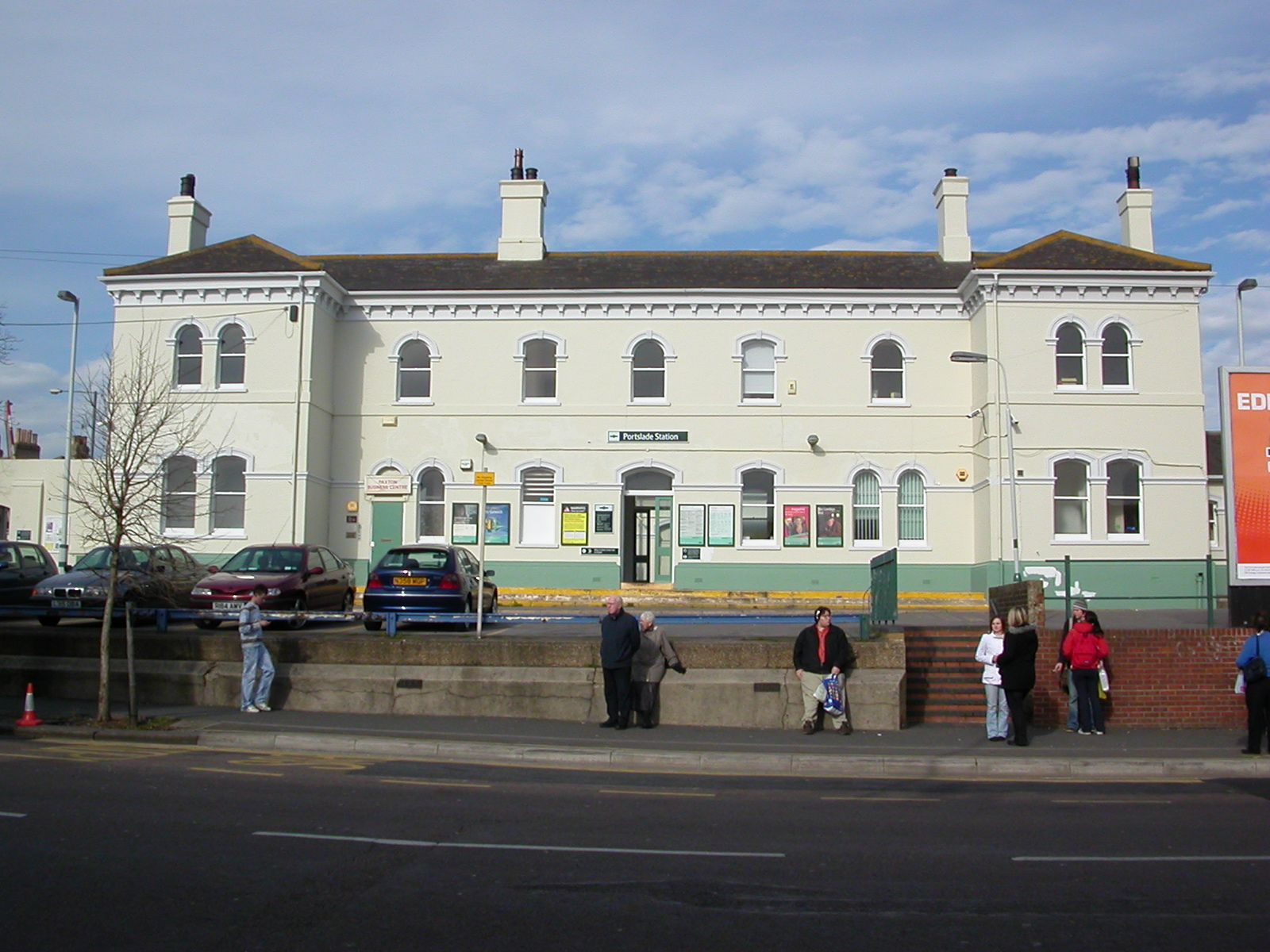
Portslade Station

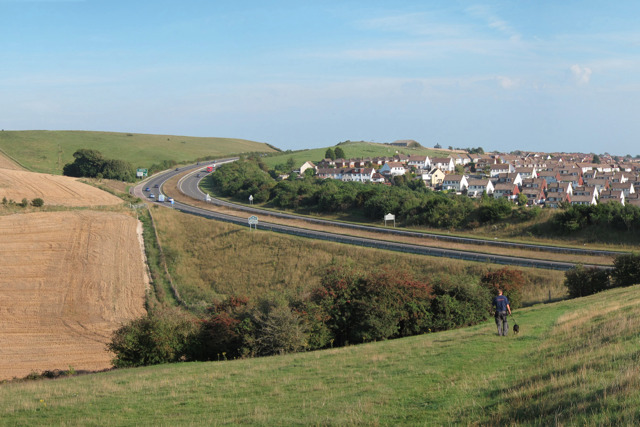
Cockroost Bottom

To the west of Brighton and Hove is Portslade. The area has three distinct centres with different histories, and includes Portslade-by-Sea, Portslade Village and Mile Oak. Each is quite different in character.

Portslade-by-Sea is largely an industrial port, with a busy canal area that opens up to the River Adur and the English Channel. It has a long history of human settlement and the name came from the Roman port, Novus Portus.

Portslade Village has kept more of its antiquity and retains many elements of the downland village it once was. Many of the buildings have their original flint walls, and there are some early manor house ruins, tree-lined parks, a landmark church and a former convent.

Mile Oak is a newer development. Until the 1920s it was only a small group of farm buildings with surrounding corn fields, sheep downs and market gardens. Then, suburban housing started to be built, and there was considerable further development in the 1960s with the construction of bungalows and other private housing. In the 1990s, after the construction of the new A27 road, Mile Oak's access to the Downs was largely blocked, stopping the spread of development.

==== Portslade downland ====
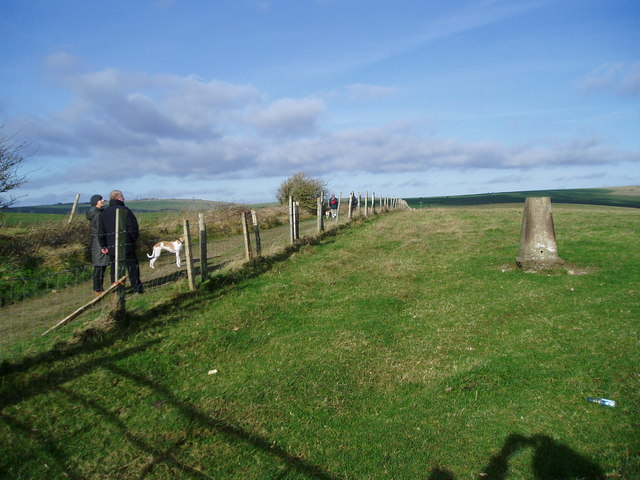
Trigpoint on the approach to Mount Zion

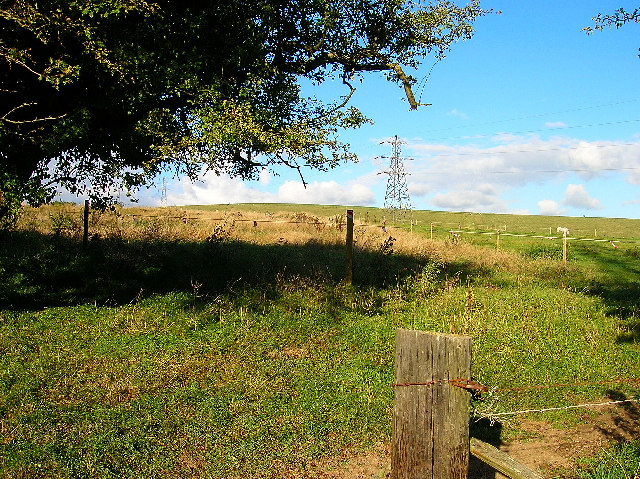
Electricity Pylons on Cockroost Hill

To the north of Mile Oak, on the other side of the A27, are a number of downland areas that are still in the Brighton and Hove area. These include the ancient chalk grassland slopes of Cockroost Hill, Cockroost Bottom and Mount Zion. They are all special areas because of the remarkable wildlife still surviving there, including rare downland flowers, orchids, butterflies and rare insects. There is a lot of history on the slopes, including a large 4000 year old Bronze Age settlement, a possible 'henge' (as in Stonehenge), now lost under the A27 bypass, and evidence of Iron Age and Romano-British field systems. To the north of the city boundary is Fulking parish. The final stretch of the Monarch's Way passes through Mile Oak and Portslade. It is a 625-mile (1,006 km) long-distance footpath that runs from Worcester to Shoreham.

=== Aldrington, Hangleton and West Blatchington ===
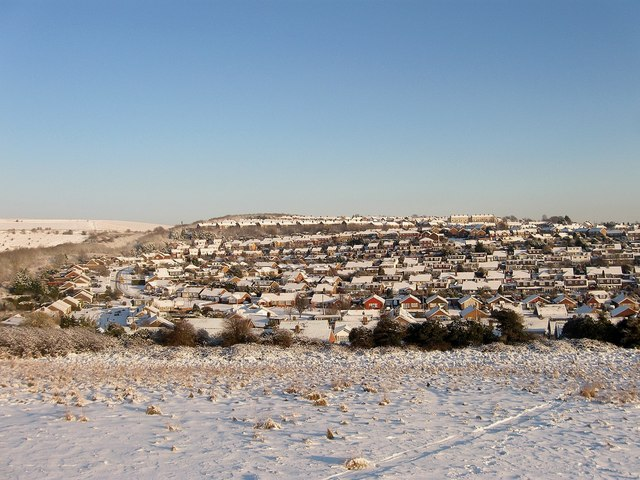
Hangleton in the snow

Aldrington sits between Portslade-by-Sea to its west and Hove to its east. For centuries Aldrington was largely countryside, with very few people living there for most of the Middle Ages, but it is now a residential area.

Like Aldrington, West Blatchington was once primarily down and sheep grazing area, but is now built up. West Blatchington manor had various lords over the centuries, but unlike Adrington and Hangleton, it was always associated with lords in the east such Lewes, Falmer, and Patcham. It is now known for its windmill and secondary school. To the east of West Blatchington is Westdene.

Hangleton is to the north of Aldrington and sits between Portslade Village and West Blatchington. The manors of Hangleton and Aldrington formed part of the Fishersgate half hundred, together with the neighbouring manor of Portslade. The lords of the Hangleton manor from 1291 to 1446 were the de Poynings, a Sussex gentry family that gave their name to the present parish of Poynings.

Hangeton was a medieval downland village in the 13th century, and by the early 14th century it had a population of about 200. Later, the village was abandoned for around six hundred years. It started to grow again in the 1950s with other areas of Brighton and is now popular for its views of the sea and green spaces.

==== Hangleton and West Blatchingham downland ====
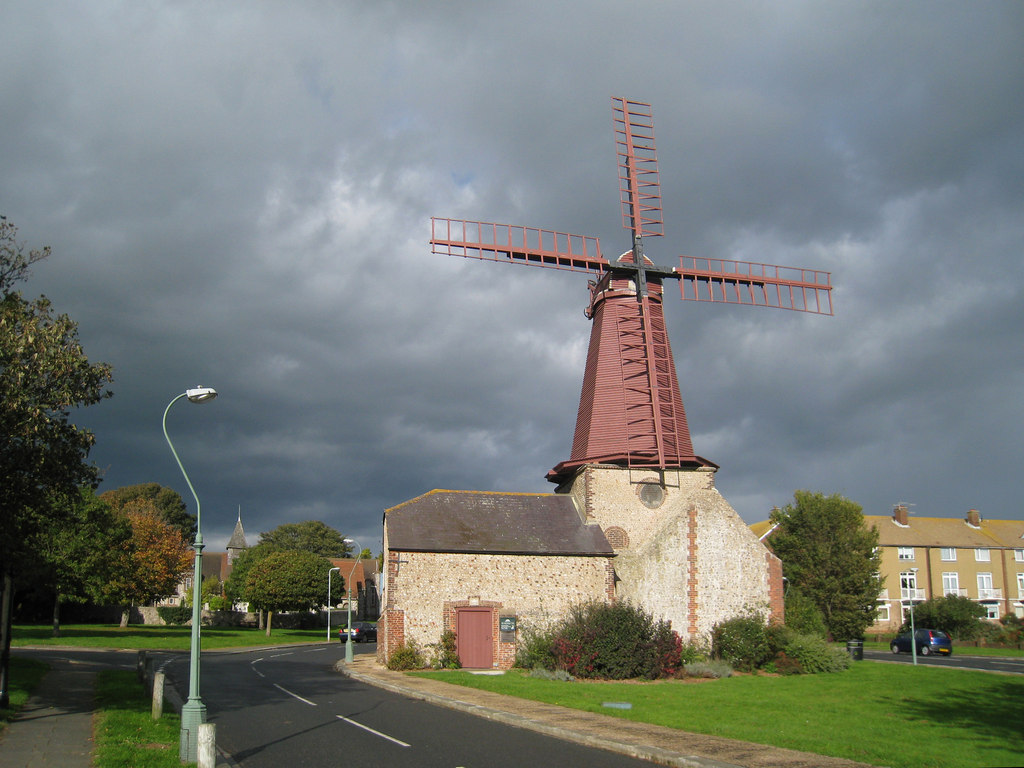
West Blatchington windmill

Between Hangleton and Westdene, south of the A27, is Toads Hole Valley. Its west slope, below Downland Drive, was once an unspoilt place for wildlife and still home to threatened species such as dormice, hedgehogs, and adders. The valley has been unmanaged for many years and the area has turned to scrub. It has now been designated for development and up to three hundred homes are planned to be built on the site.

To the north of the A27 are two golf courses, the West Hove and Brighton and Hove Golf courses. The two are divided by the Old Dyke Railway Trail which follows part of the route taken by the old Dyke Railway Branch Line. The line opened in September 1887 and took people from Hove to the popular downland beauty spot of Devil's Dyke. When the railway closed in December 1938, the line lay unused until the Dyke Railway Trail was created in 1988. There are a number of ways through Hangleton to a bridge over the A27 bypass where the trail begins, but the original route took you from Aldrington railway station and above the Hove cemetery. Much of the trail across the Downs is on a hard surface.

There are many archaic Down pastures in the area. To the west is Benfield Hill (TQ 261 078), a local nature reserve which is famous for its glowworm displays on midsummer evenings. On the steep east side of the hill there is large thyme, autumn gentian and many butterflies. Bee orchids can be also found in some years. To the north of this area is the Poynings parish and the impressive geography of Devil's Dyke.

To the east is Round Hill where there are many signs of the past from different periods of human history. There are several old barrows in the area. There is an old flint barn (TQ 269 090) called the Skeleton Hovel which is thought to commemorate a prehistoric burial site. Round Hill's eastern slope (TQ 269 085) is the richest chalk grassland site in Hangleton, though it desperately needs grazing management for its many downland flowers such as field fleawort, chalk milkwort, orchids, cowslips, hairy violet, rockrose, crested hair-grass, and devil's bit scabious. There are two rare Forester moth species, fox moth and heath moth, purse-web spider, moss, and pygmy snails. To the north of Round Hill is the Newtimber parish.

=== Westdene, Withdean, and Patcham ===
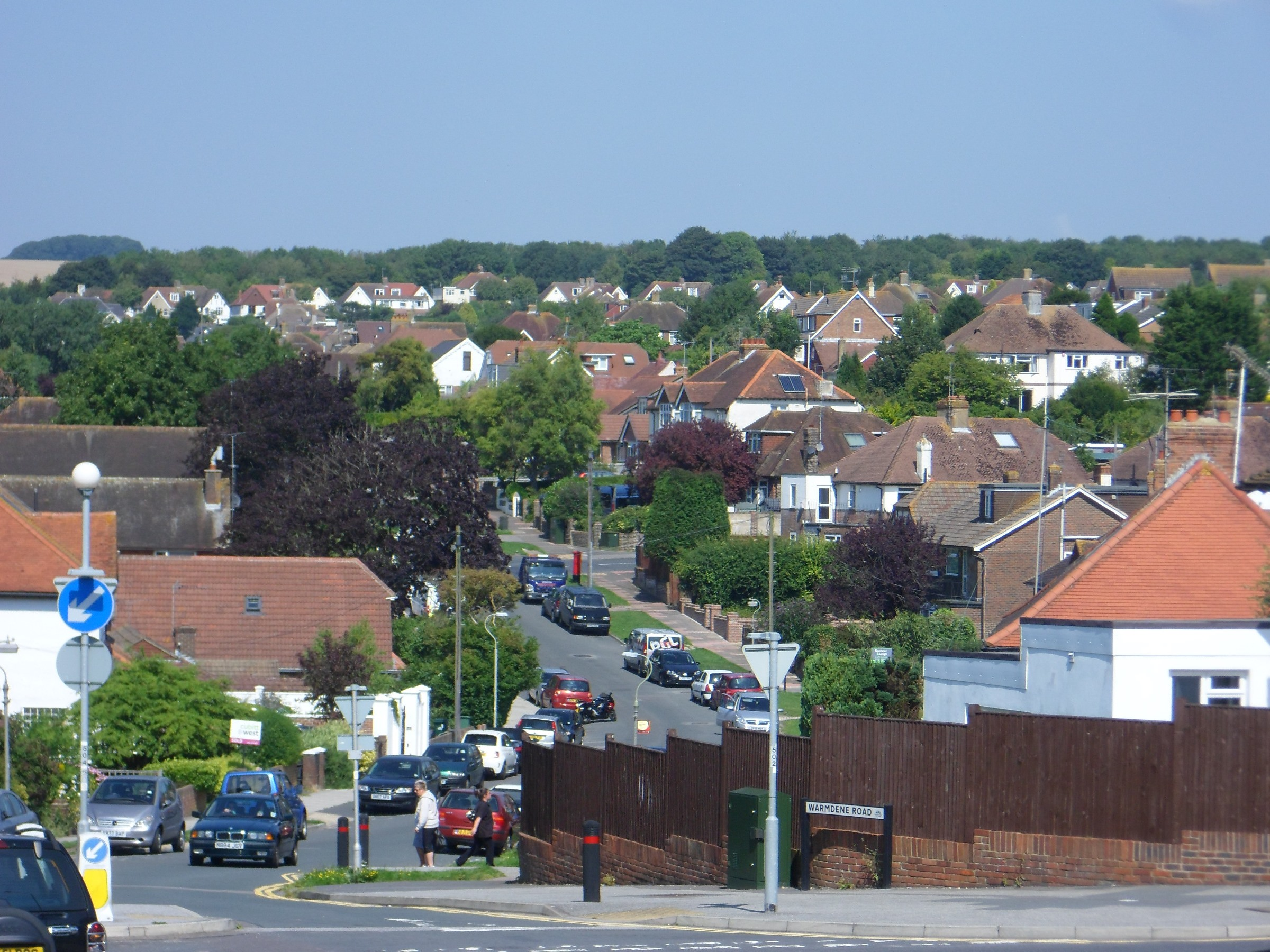
Northward view along Warmdene Road, Patcham

Patcham, Westdene, and Withdean are divided by the London Road. Of the three, Patcham (TQ 301 090), has much the longest history of human settlement and retains much from its agricultural past. It was one of the bigger settlements in Sussex at the time of Domesday book, which recorded that it had 10 shepherds and 6 slaves. Even an Archbishop of Canterbury, John Pecham, came from the village. The area still has many old flint cottages, big allotment sites and winding twittens. There is Patcham Place and Park. The best cluster of buildings comprise its Norman church (which has kept part of its medieval wall paintings) and the old buildings of Patcham Court Farm, with a 17th-century flint farmhouse and dovecot.

The areas of Withdean and Westdene were historically farmland but have been developed, mainly in the 1920s and 1930s, with a mix of detached, semi-detached and mid-rise flats. The Withdean manor was originally the property of the great Cluniac Priory of St. Pancras at Lewes, until 1537. This was then given to Anne of Cleves in 1541 by Henry VIII. The manor was demolished in 1936. Westdene sits to the north of Brighton, east of West Blatchington and north of Withdean.

Withdean Park is to the east of the London Road, and is home to the national collection of lilacs with over 250 varieties. Collections of berberis, cotoneaster and viburnum can also be found here. Withdean Woods is next to Withdean stadium and is a wooded hillside nature reserve approximately 2.47 acres (1 ha) in size. It is the home of several woodland birds including the great spotted woodpecker, tawny owl, goldcrest, firecrest, and in winter the stinking hellebore.

==== Waterhall downland ====
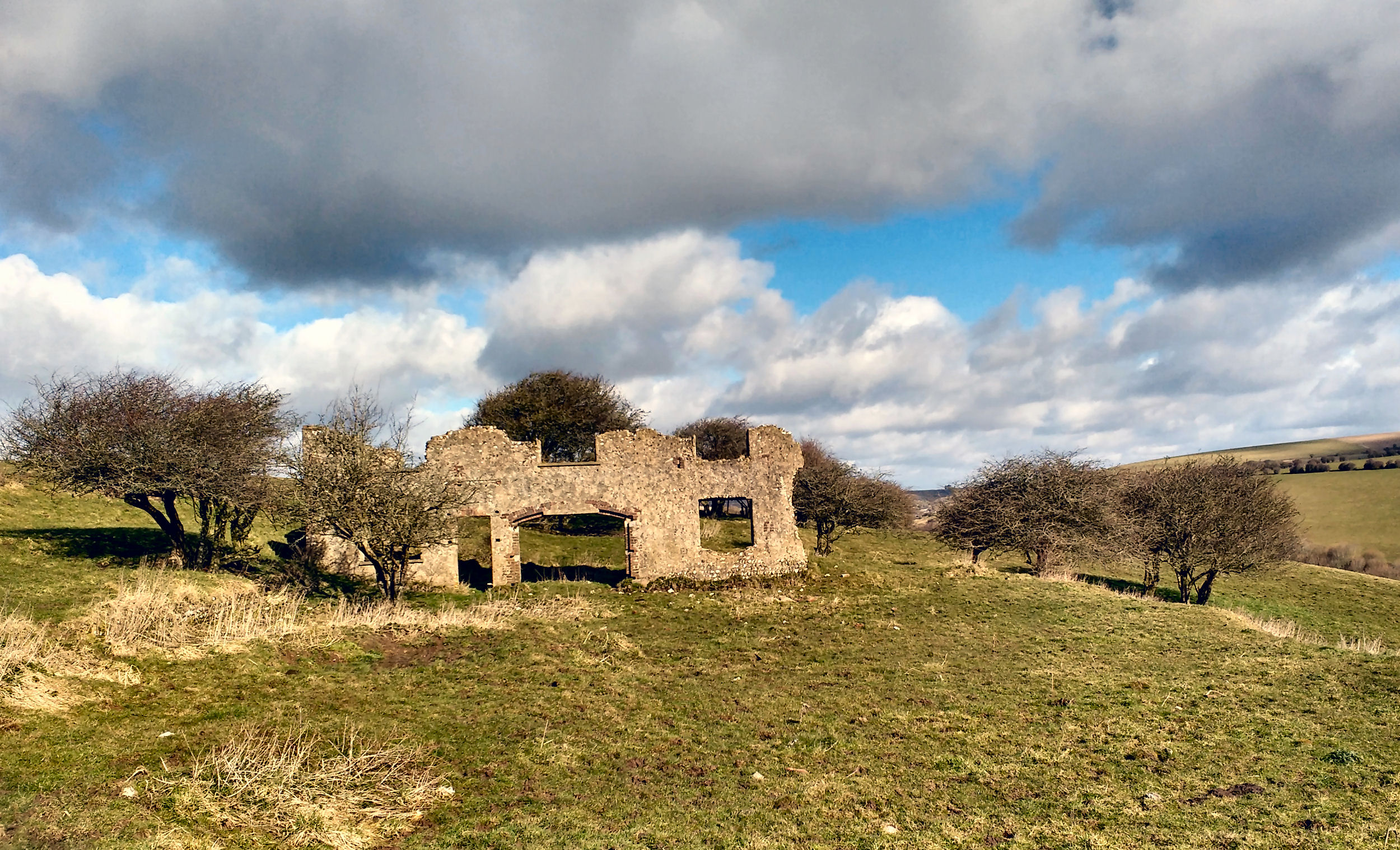
Sweet Hill, near Patcham, Brighton, The old farm house

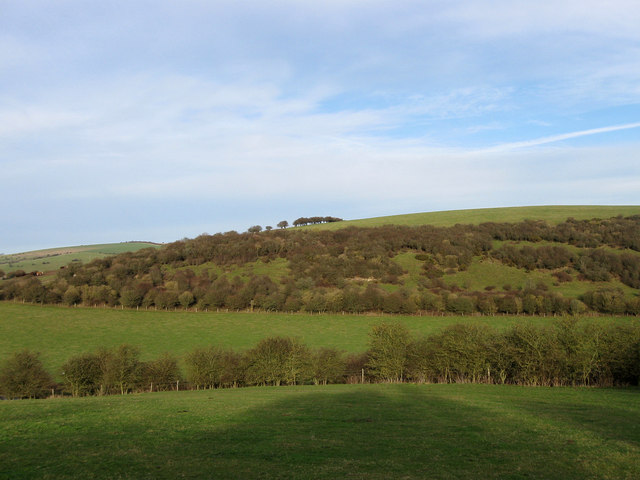
Varncombe Hill

To the west of the A23 and north of Westdene and the A27 is Waterhall (TQ 284 087), and its lost 18th century farm is now the site of football and rugby pitches. The Waterhall Golf Course has just been given over to a version of rewilding which involves the restoration of species-rich chalk grassland There is still a significant population of adders. By the bridlepath just downhill of the old clubhouse there are the damaged remains of a Bronze Age round barrow (TQ 283 087) which has long acted as a marker on the old parish boundaries. Since the cessation of golf play harebell, scabious, cowslip, rockrose, betony, Sussex rampion and horseshoe vetch have flowered ebulliently. There are large old anthills and chalkhill blue, small blue and adonis blue and brown argus butterflies, and all three species of Forester moth. At the corner of the Saddlescombe Road and the turn-off to the golf clubhouse, there is a sarsen stone (TQ 278 090) marking this point in the medieval boundary between Patcham and West Blatchington parishes.

To the north is Varncombe Hill, which borders the Newtimber parish. Its south-west facing slope(TQ 280 099) is heavily scrubbed-up, though lovely old pasture glades survive. Rockrose is one of the commonest flowers here, with some of its associated fungi. The west facing slopes of Varncombe Hill (TQ 279 105) were sold by Brighton Council with the rest of Saddlescombe Farm to the National Trust, but the trust did not dedicate them as access land, though they qualified and the National Trust had the power to do so.

To the east of Waterhall is Sweet Hill. The Hill has a flowery bank on its western slope (TQ 286 091), a bushy lynchet and an old dewpond site on its brow. The Sussex Border Path takes you north to Pangdean Bottom and the Pyecombe parish. Pangdean Bottom is the west of the A23 and is rented by a tenant farmer from Brighton and Hove City Council, who have owned it since 1924. It includes ancient chalk grassland slopes where there are still chalkland flowers and butterflies. In late summer, the valley's north side has one of the largest populations of autumn ladies'-tresses orchid has been recorded, together with a large population of the white variety of the self heal violet. The scrub at the head of the valley is old and diverse, with wayfaring tree, old man's beard, honeysuckle, hazel, and gorse.

In July 2021 the Sussex-based 'Landscapes of Freedom' group, together with Nick Hayes and Guy Shrubsole of the 'Right to Roam' network, organised a mass trespass in protest against the lack of public access to this valley and its management for game bird shooting, which has badly affected its chalk grassland wildlife. Over 300 people walked from Waterhall, Brighton, to Pangdean Bottom in protest. The public are actively discouraged from walking in the area and scrub has been allowed to grow on the pristine downland, whilst other parts have been ploughed out.

To the north of the city boundary in this area is the Pyecombe parish.

==== Patcham downland ====
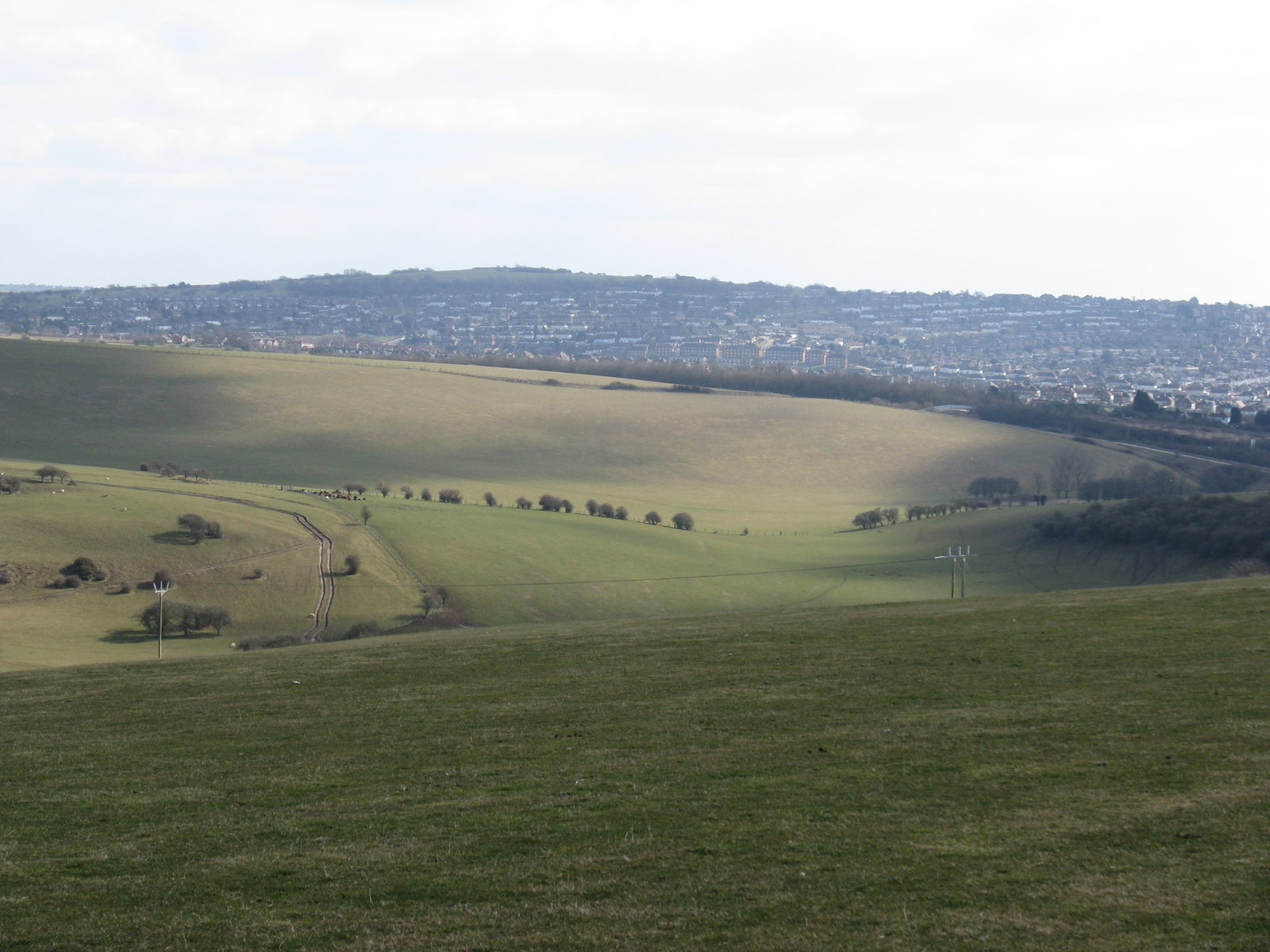
Ewe Bottom from the Sussex Border Path

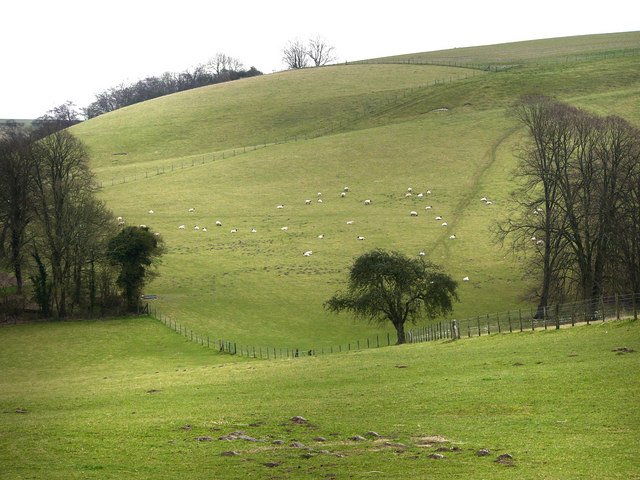
Sheep on Tegdown Hill

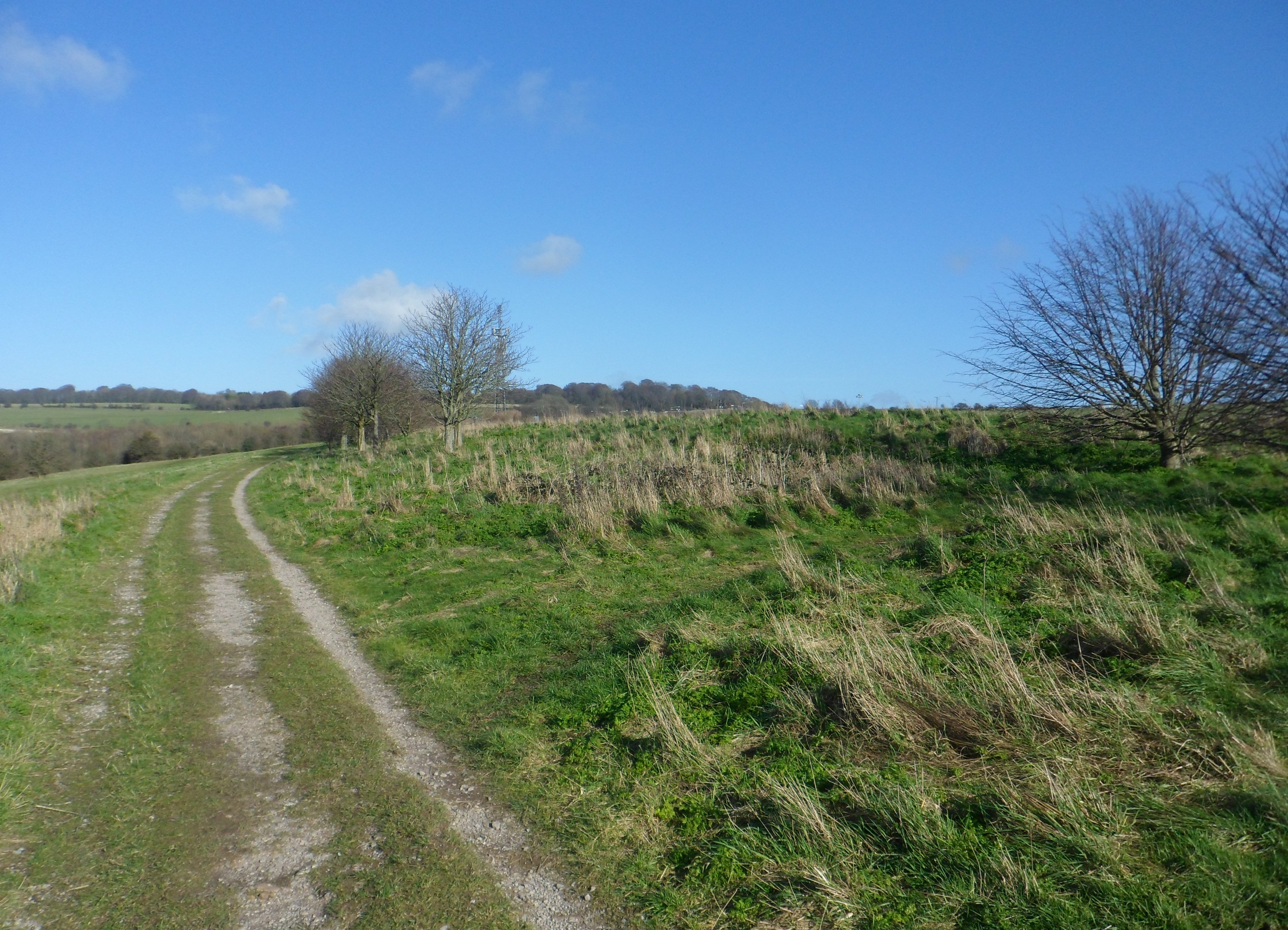
Southwestward view along Ladies Mile, Patcham

The Downland to the north of Patcham leads up to Ditchling Beacon and the western end of the Clayton to Offham Escarpment. Tegdown Hill is the next hill to the west of the downland Ditchling Road. A remarkable "ring barrow" survives (TQ 313 101) on its brow, together with the slight mounds of two other bowl barrows. Tegdown ring barrow has been described as "probably the best of this type in the county". It consists of a circular bank with a ditch and a flattish interior. It lies just south of a big dried up dew pond. From Tegdown you can see the three Iron Age camps of Hollingbury Castle, Ditchling Beacon, and the Devil's Dyke. To the north of the city boundary is the long Ditchling parish.

The Mid Sussex track of the Sussex Border Path starts at the A27 roundabout and the eastern track takes you up Ewebottom Hiil leaving Scare Hill to its west, passing the Chattri to the east and on to Holt Hill and the Pyecombe parish. The western track takes you to Waterhall across the A23.

Walking from Patcham towards Standean Farm. after descending the hill into Ewe Bottom, visitors may see the old Tegdown pastures to their right, where the steepest slope and the lynchets have fine chalk downland flowers. Opposite the slope is the mouth of Deep Bottom (TQ 303 105), the southerly slope of which is a colourful old pasture site with abundant rockrose and which rises up to the Chattri. In autumn there are boletes and several old meadow waxcaps and a fairy club fungus.

To the south of the A27 and on the western edge of Patcham is Ladies Mile Down (TQ 318 093), which has designated as a Local nature reserve. The area is a remarkable survival of plateau chalk grassland on Downland, where almost all such flattish sites have been destroyed by modern farming. The ancient turf has preserved lots of odd linear banks, which are surviving fragments of an Iron Age and Romano-British lynchetted field system. The banks once stretched across the line of the A27 bypass, beyond which one or two more fragments also survive. At the eastern end of the Down, is a Bronze Age burial mound recognisable as a low, grassy tump. The area is rich with summer flowers. Harebell, Sussex rampion flower, rockrose, and yellow rattle are enjoyed by locals here and at midsummer there are still good numbers of glowworms. Later in the summer months, the violet-blue of devil's-bit scabious and the powder-blue lesser scabious radiate.

==== The Chattri ====
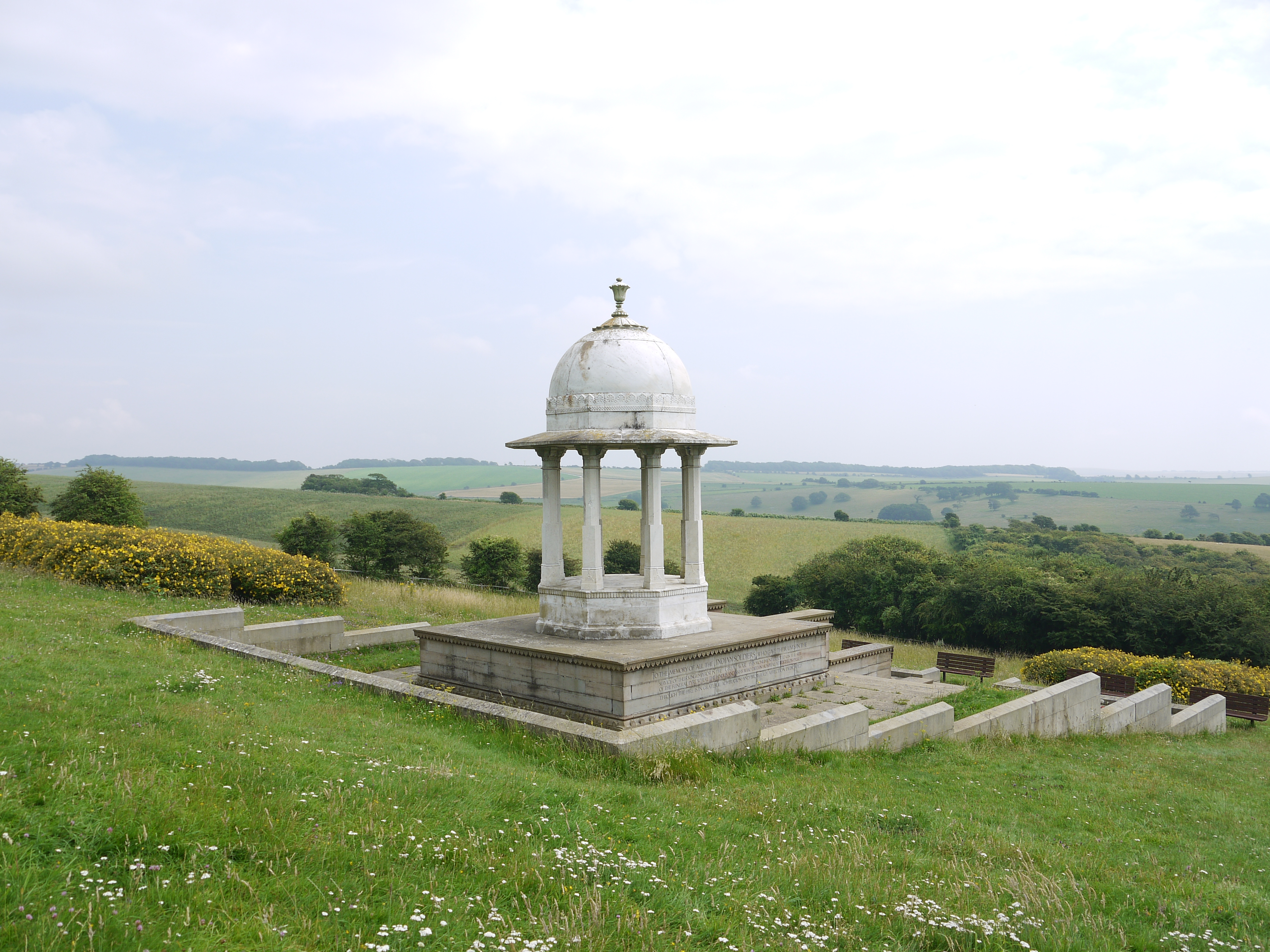
Chattri Brighton from the West

The Chattri (TQ 304 110) is a place of memorial and a destination for walks. It can be accessed from the Sussex Border Path to its west or by scrambling through the thickets of Deep Bottom. It is a solemn place where the bodies of First World War Indian Sikh and Hindu soldiers who died from wounds whilst being nursed at the Brighton Pavilion "passed through the fire", for this was their "ghat", or place of cremation. Its white Sicilian marble dome is in good condition, but the surrounding memorial garden is often unkept.

=== Hollingbury and Hollingdean ===
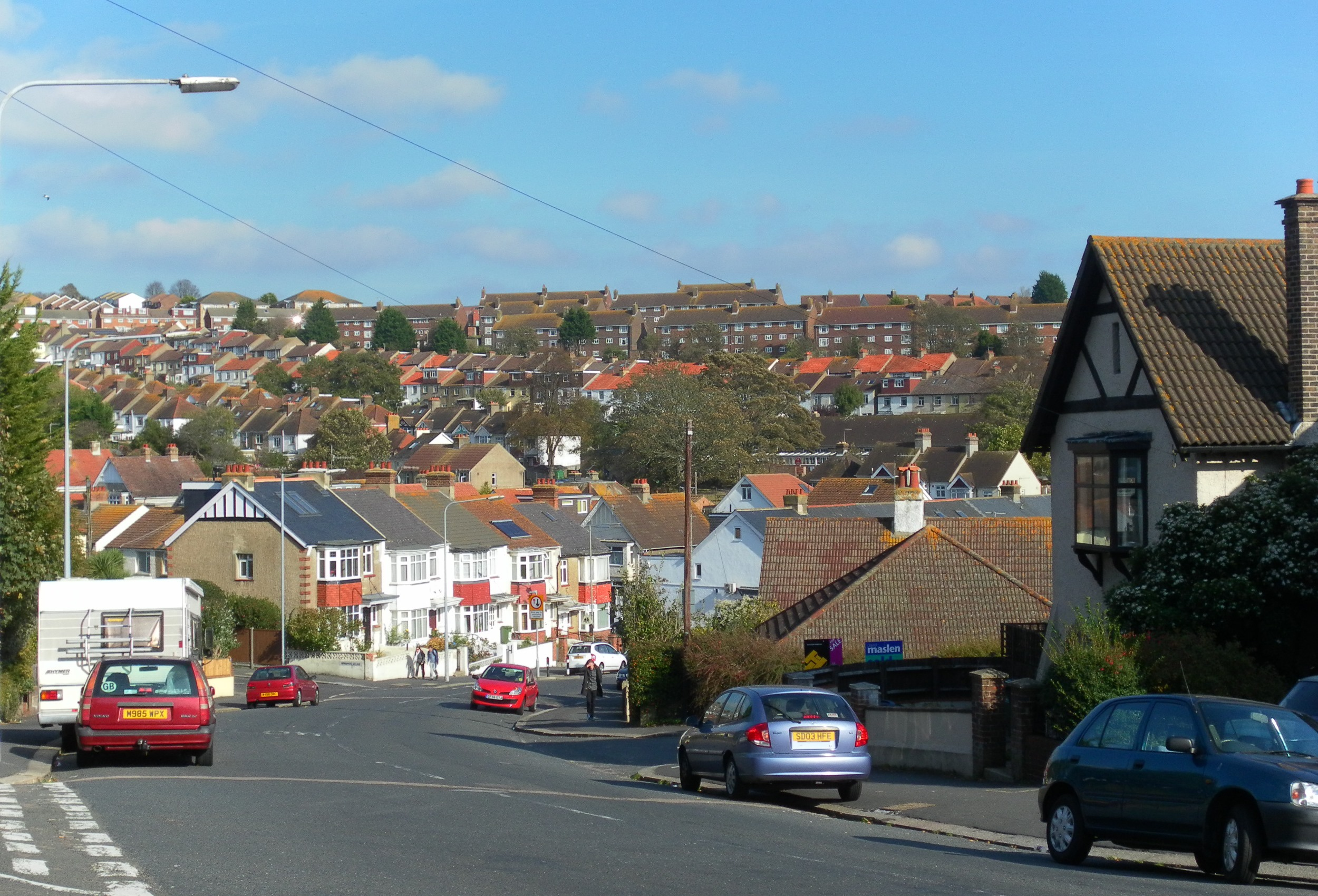
Northeastward view along Hollingbury Crescent, Hollingdean

What is now considered to be Hollingbury is the slope facing west, east of Patcham and north of Fiveways. However, old Hollingbury was the crest of the hill by the Hollingbury Castle hillfort, Hollingbury Park and even the east-facing slope. Until the 1930s the area was open downland with farms, small-holdings and piggeries. After World War Two, Hollingbury was used for a factory estate with the housing for the workforce.

Hollingdean is in the combe east of Ditchling Road and rising up to the north-facing slope to Roedale allotments, the golf course and hillfort. It is now mainly a residential area, with many council houses to the east and low-rise flats in the central part, with late 19th- and early 20th-century terraced houses towards Fiveways.

==== Hollingbury Castle, Hollingbury Woods, and Wild Park ====
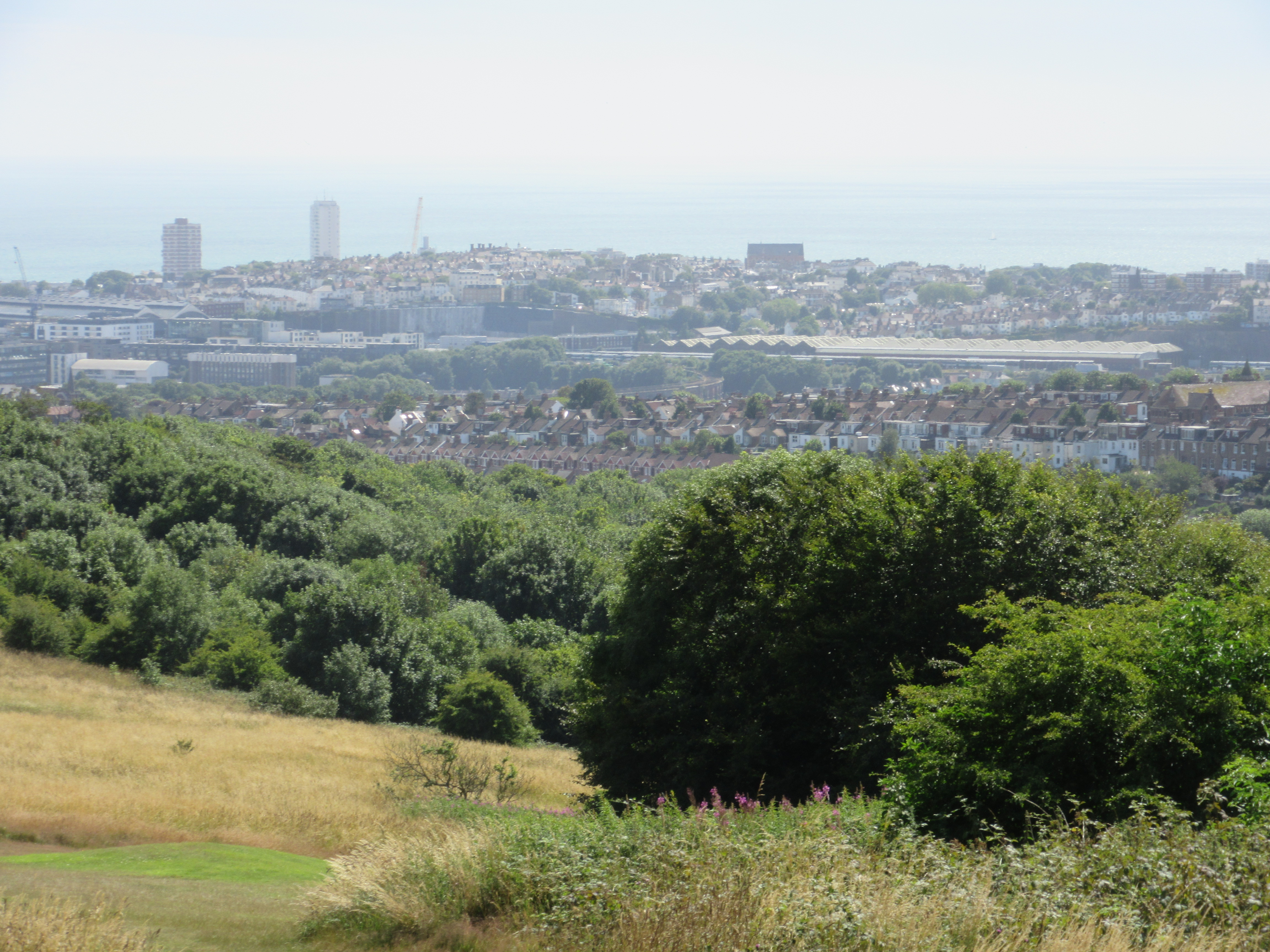
View from Hollingbury Hill, Brighton

There is an oasis of undeveloped green space at the peak of the Down between Hollingbury, Hollingdean], and Coldean. At its centre is Hollingbury Castle or Hillfort (TQ 322 078).This Iron Age hillfort is a scheduled ancient monument, of Iron Age date, whilst the four mounded round barrows within its ramparts are made by Bronze Age people, who held this place sacred. There are thickets of gorse which shine yellow in spring and are home to linnets and goldfinch. European stonechat is a familiar bird, too, and the rarer whinchat and redstart are seen regularly on passage to and from their breeding grounds. The soil within and around the camp has a layer of superficial acidity, with sorrel, bent-grass, and tormentil growing there.

To the south is Hollingbury Golf Course, the Roedale allotments and Hollingbury Park (TQ 314 075). The park was originally part of the golf course. Its Edwardian pavilion was the original (circa 1908) clubhouse. East of the park is the two-century-old Hollingbury Woods, now full of the rotting carcasses of beech giants toppled in the 1987 gale. It is a popular walk, with Fittleworth Stone walks, glades, and benches. It has received the loving care of a local "Friends" group for many years now.

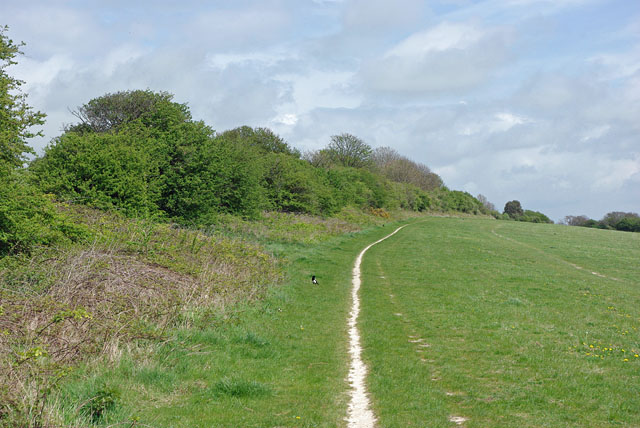
Footpath towards Moulsecoomb Wild Park

To the west of Moulsecoombe is Wild Park (TQ 327 080). The park is a valley/coombe which runs down from Hollingbury Castle and was opened in 1925. In the 1850s the valley, then known as Hollingbury Coombe, was one of the most famous of Sussex sites for lepidopterists (butterfly and moth experts), but Dark green fritillary, silver-washed fritillary and silver-spotted skipper, once present in numbers, are rarely seen there now. Despite this, there are parts which are still rich in diversity and it is still good for butterflies. In spring one may still see the green hairstreak or orange-tip or find the wacky small bloody-nosed beetle and there are still adonis blue, chalkhill blue and common blues and brown argus and glowworms in midsummer. There are also orchids, harebells, sheets of rockrose, Sussex rampion, devil's-bit, and carline thistle. In autumn there are fungi too, including penny-bun bolete, collared earthstar, stinkhorn, and shaggy inkcap in the circling woods.

=== Coldean, Moulsecoomb, and Bevendean ===
Coldean, Moulsecoomb, and Bevendean are suburbs developed by Brighton Corporation in the 1950s necessitated by the acute housing shortage in the area after World War II. The districts are all in beautiful downland areas.

Coldean occupies a deep valley on the historic boundary of Falmer and Stanmer parishes and is only separated from Hollingbury Hillfort by Wild Park. It has recently been approved to build over two hundred new homes in green land adjoining the South Downs and Stanmer Estate that ten years ago had been proposed to be a local nature reserve.

Bevendean is in a valley nestled between Bevendean Down and Heath Hill.

Moulsecoomb is on the other side of the Lewes Road and backs on to Falmer Hill, and is home to the University of Brighton's Moulsecoomb campus and Moulsecoomb Place. North of Moulsecoomb is the Falmer train station, University of Brighton's Falmer campus, and Falmer Stadium.

==== Stanmer village and Stanmer park ====
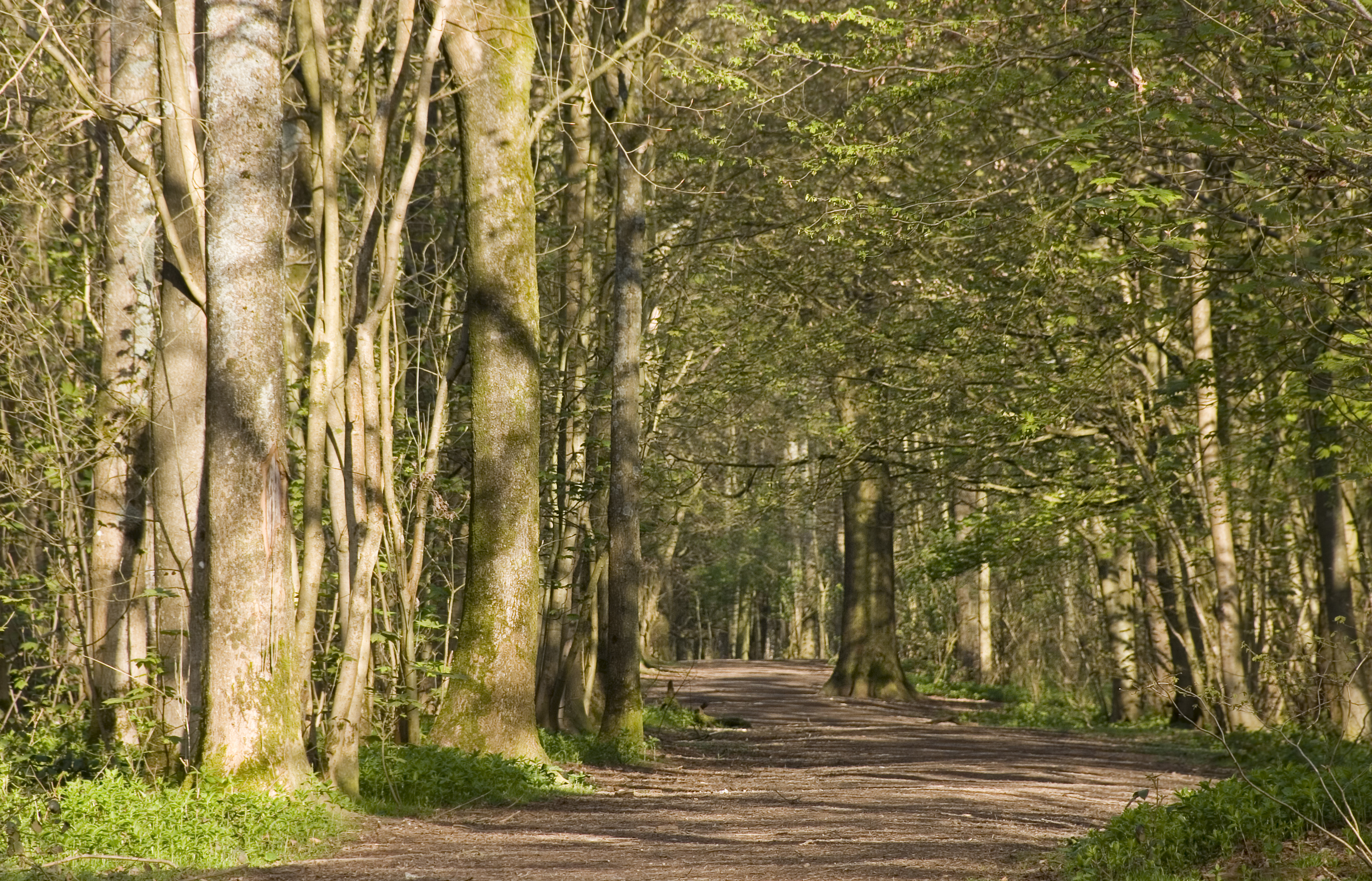
Stanmer Park

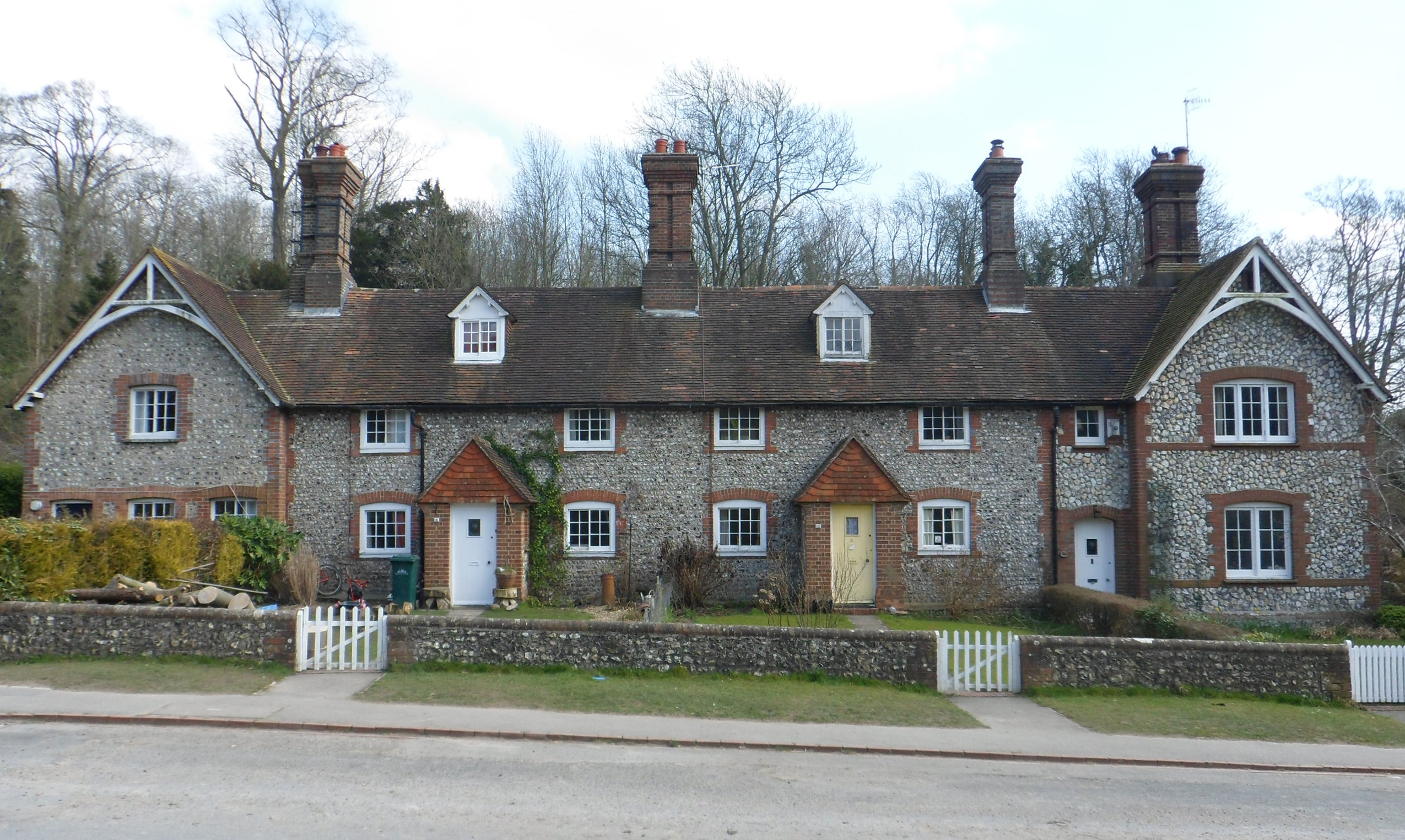
Stanmer Village

In this area to the north east of Coldean are two further valleys. The first is occupied by Stanmer village (TQ 33 09), a village with much historical value. The upper village street has eighteen flint cottages, with colourful gardens. The church was reconstructed in 1838, but the date of the original church can be guessed from the two huge and knotty yews in the churchyard. Next to the church is a pond, which although often unkempt, is probably the reason why Stanmer is so called, as "stan mere" is likely to derive from the Saxon "stony pool".^{:312} Between the church and the barn is a Tudor well 252 feet deep and a wooden donkey wheel, like that at Saddlescombe, contained within a flint well-house. The well was in use until mains water was installed in 1900.

Stanmer Woods were transformed in the 18th century after the Pelhams, later Earls of Chichester, had bought them. They planted a circle of woods along the hill-tops surrounding the dry valley in which the village lay and more shaws and clumps were scattered within. In 2007 the City Council took the initiative after the recent retirement of the Park's farming tenant and opened up all the closed woods and pasture fields to public access. The paths, gates and benches the council made are all popular with Brighton residents and beyond.

The largest plantation is called the Great Wood (TQ 335 090) and has acquired many of the plants of ancient woodland, some by planting and some have made their own way there. Under the council's control there has been new planting: "The trees are laid out alphabetically, with Acer and Betula at the lower east end and Ulmus and Zelkova high up to the west". On the lawns behind the House is a large Blue Atlas Cedar with several smaller companions.

The next valley is occupied by the University of Sussex, which opened in 1961. In 2021, it is the place of study of over 16,000 students. The Brighton and Hove City border is surrounded by the large Falmer parish in this area.

==== Bevendean Down and Falmer Hill ====
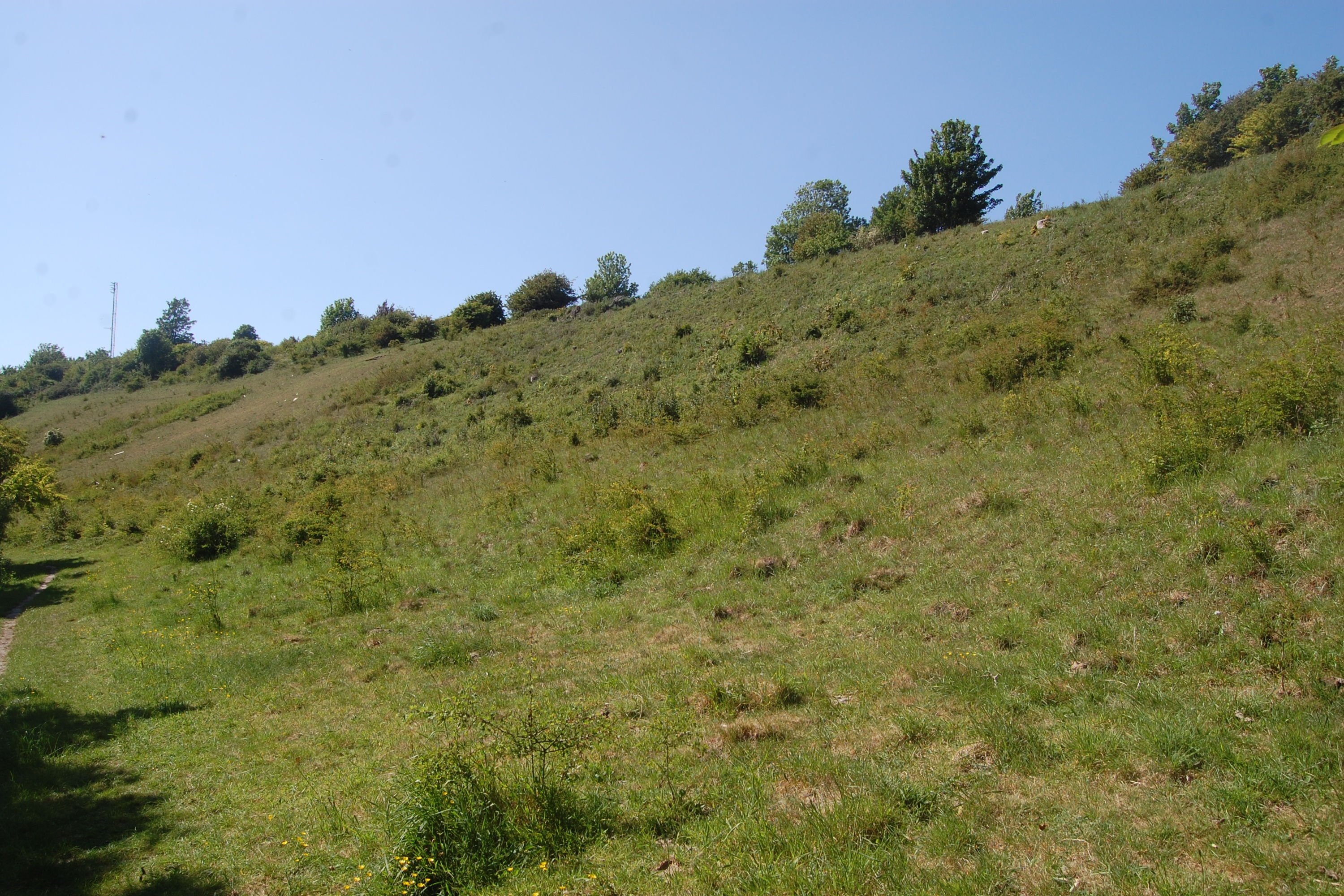
Bevendean Down (Local Nature Reserve)

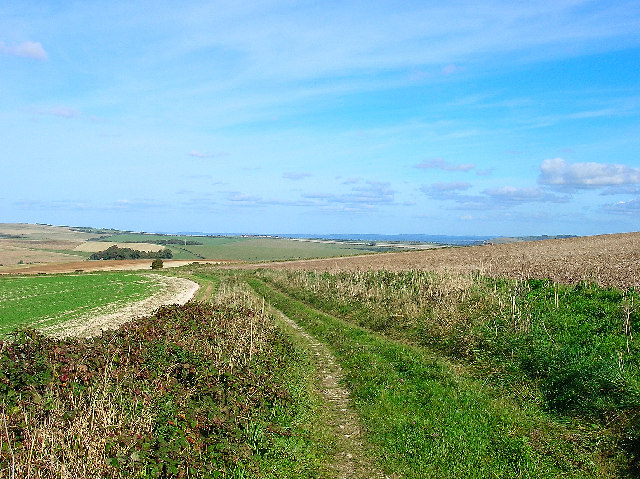
Bridleway, Falmer Hill

Bevendean Down (TQ 33 06) is a local nature reserve. Its hot, south-facing slopes and as a result is home to lizards and many butterflies. The area is well looked after by local people in cooperation with the tenant farmer and the Council rangers. There is a dew pond where swallows and house martins skim the water. Chalkhill blue and adonis blue and brown argus butterflies are found in numbers in the area. Hogtrough Bottom (TQ 340 070) has a mixture of taller grassland, short sheep's fescue turf, and scrub. On the shorter ground some years are large swarms of autumn ladies tresses. There are lots of scarce species such as bastard toadflax, waxcap, and webcap fungi, four-spot orb-weaver and purseweb spiders, but the tapestry of summer colours is the main delight which come from the purple knapweed and felwort, blue scabious, yellow hawkbit, and rockrose.

On the southern side of Bevendean is Heath Hill which runs up to Warren Road and two horse pasture smallholdings, Southdown Riding Stables (TQ 335 058) and Inglesíde Stables to the east. Neither receive any agro-chemicals and consequently have gathered rich wildlife in the past half century. Swallows and swifts, bats and dung beetles, rooks and woodpecker and the hornet robberfly all survive on the rich supply of insects attracted by the pony dung. Both the farmsteads of Southdown's and Ingleside Stables are targeted for housing development within Brighton and Hove City Council's draft City Plan Part 2. The loss of these two farmsteads, which organise the grazing of these nature-rich pastures, would put them at risk. To the east of Heath Hill is Race Hill which is part of the Bevendean Down LNR. The Brighton Permaculture Trust has created a community orchard on Race Hill.

Falmer Hill (TQ 365 076) gives great views across to Hollingbury Castle and Stanmer Park and the higher Downs beyond. The Hill's top remained unploughed till the last World War. It had a cluster of about ten probably Saxon barrows and a couple of round barrows. Nothing remains now except white smears of chalk and flint on the ploughed earth, where the barrows were. To the west of the Hill is City boundary which borders the Kingston near Lewes parish.

=== Kemptown, Whitehawk and Roedean ===
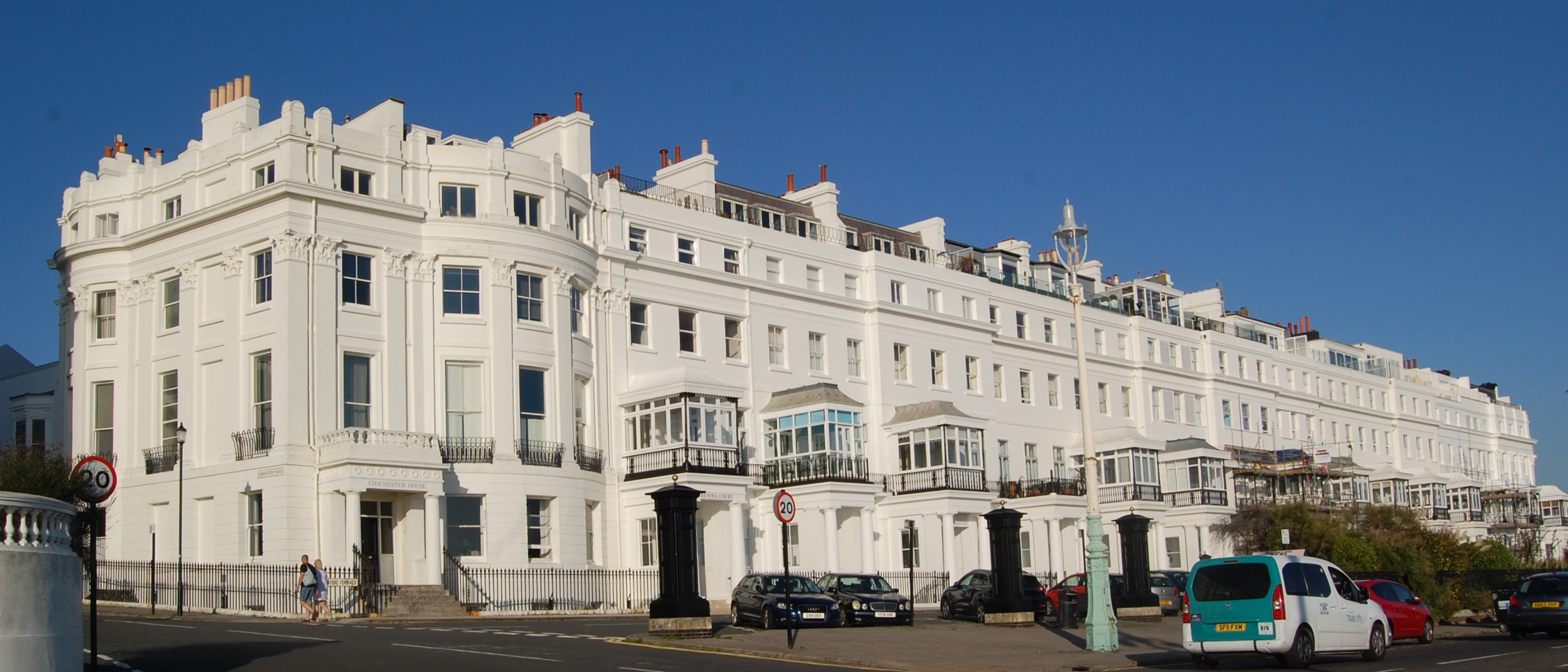
1–14 Chichester Terrace, Kemp Town

Kemp Town is a district to east of Brighton. It was designed by Thomas Read Kemp (1782–1844). It includes the elegant grade I listed buildings such as those of Sussex Square, Lewes Crescent, Arundel, and Chichester Terraces, and the less prestigious areas such as Rock Gardens to the east. The area includes the Royal Sussex Hospital. The beach south of Kemp Town is known as Black Rock. To the east of Kemp Town is Roedean gap. There is some housing and Roedean school, a public girls school that faces the sea.

To the north of Kemp Town is Whitehawk, a district of Brighton that has been built since 1931. On the saddle between Whitehawk Hill and Race Hill is Whitehawk Camp which is a Neolithic causewayed camp, one of eight causewayed camps known to have existed in the Sussex Downs. The camp is a scheduled ancient monument. To the northwest of Whitehawk is Brighton Race Course. Horse racing started on the Hill in the late 18th century next to the causewayed camp.

==== Whitehawk Hill, Sheepcote Valley, and East Brighton Golf Course ====
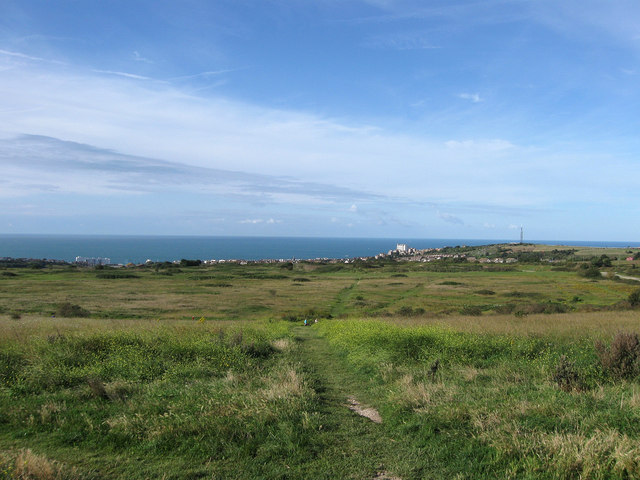
Sheepcote Valley

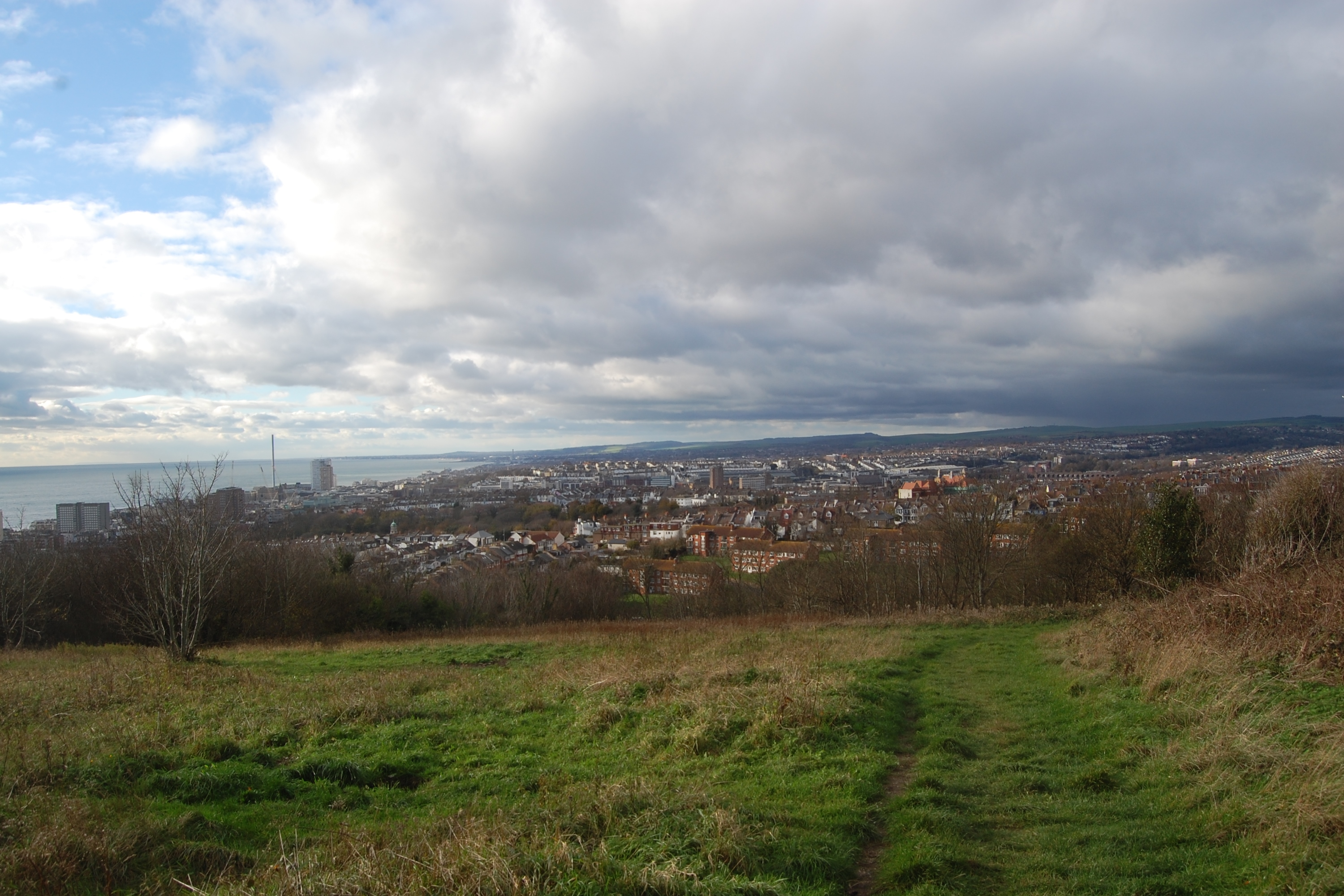
Westward view across Brighton from Whitehawk Hill

Whitehawk Hill's lower slopes have large allotment sites, and there is a transmitting station on its top. To the north of the hilltop is the Neolithic Whitehawk Camp.

To the east of Whitehawk is Sheepcote Valley (TQ 341 045). Here over 90 hectares (220 acres) are open to the public. In the 1870s there was a rifle range for volunteer soldiers sited here. The park was acquired in 1913 and laid out with plants and sports pitches in 1925. The northern part of the Valley served for many years as a municipal rubbish dump. When that purpose was completed, however, a kilometre and more of the upper Valley was terraced with six giant steps, which have now softened further with the cover of grass and low scrub. Now many birds breed in the area and many more pass through and stop extended periods on migration. Uncommon bird species are often seen there, such as rare warblers, wryneck, and redstarts. Sheepcote's lower valley has a caravan park where the first municipal site in the country was opened in 1938. There are playing fields embraced by the valley slopes and a café in East Brighton Park.

To its east is East Brighton Golf Course (TQ 346 042) with extensive roughs, scrub thickets, and woodland. In winter, short-eared owls often reside in the area. Below the course is Roedean Bottom (TQ 349 033). It sits between Roedean School and a pitch and putt golf course. On the east slope of the Bottom there is a little piece of aboriginal Downland turf, where in late summer autumn ladies' tresses orchid grow, with carline thistle and hairy violet. Tiny moss snail in the turf demonstrates the site's antiquity. East again from the Golf Course (and southwest of Woodingdean) is Wick Bottom (TQ 35 04). This peaceful dean takes its name from the medieval farm on the Falmer Road, now long-gone. The name 'wick' may denote a far more ancient, perhaps Roman, farmstead. In modern times it has been a place of arable stubbles, but there be a good array of chalk loving plants such as night flowering catchfly, henbit deadnettle, field madder, round-leaved fluellen, and common fumitory.

=== Woodingdean, Ovingdean, and Rottingdean ===
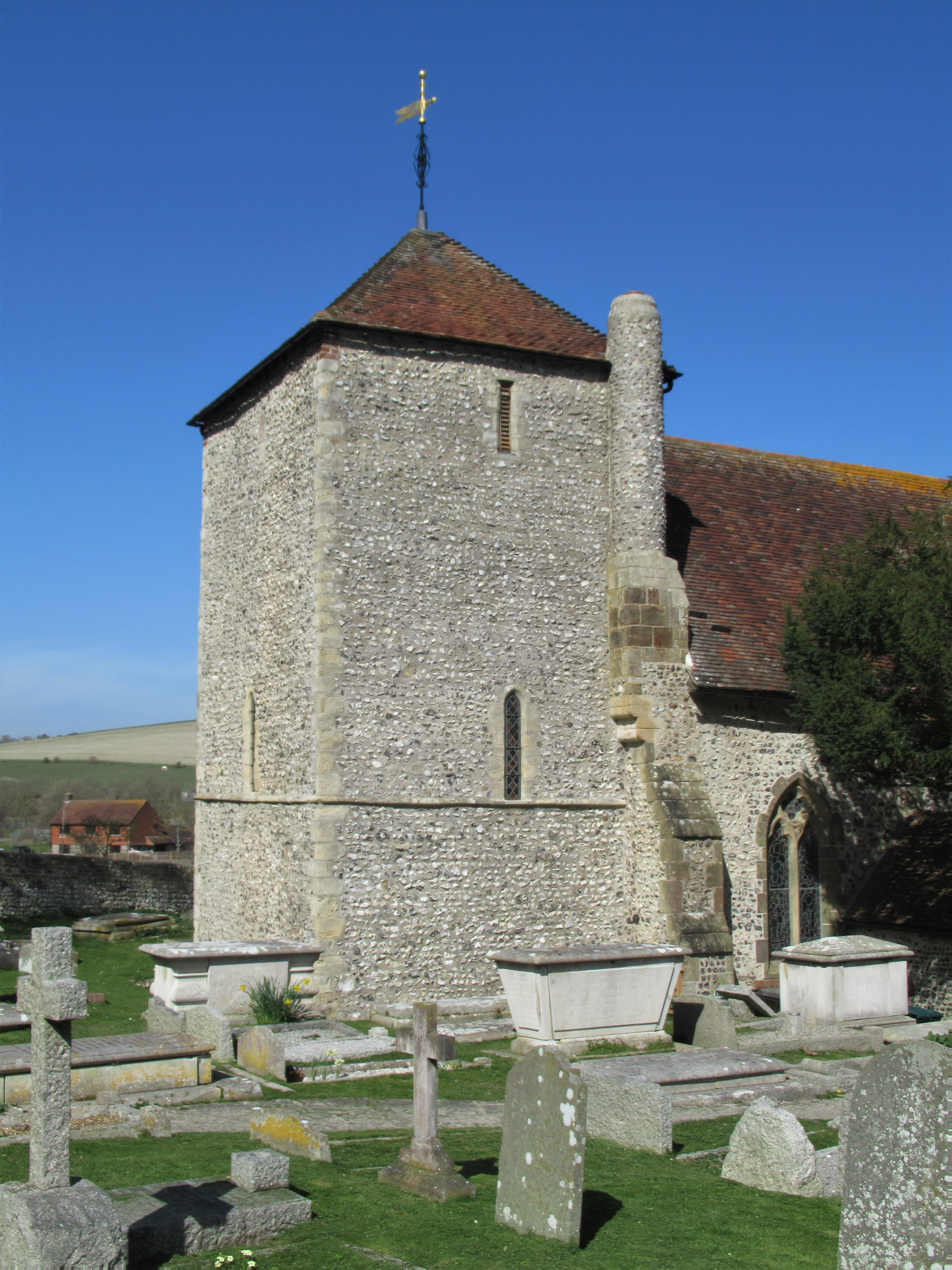
St Wulfran, Ovingdean

Ovingdean (TQ 355 035) is east of Brighton and slightly set back from the sea. It is a historic settlement that has existed since at least the Iron Age about 600 BC. In ancient documents, the area is described as "Ofamn-inge-denu" or "the valley of the enclosure of Ofa's people". The Domesday book of 1086 records that the manor of 'hovingedene'. At that time the population of Ovingdean was about 90 people who included the lord of the manor and his family.

By 2020 there were nearer 1,200 inhabitants and many new buildings, but the old core of Ovingdean still exists and many flint walls, old cottages, barns (converted) and gentry houses have been retained. The Norman church of St Wulfran's is the oldest surviving building in the village and has lots of surviving early details. North of the church the stonewalled paddock is full of humps and hollows that mark where a Saxon thane had his manor house. To the south of the village in front of the sea is one of Blind Veterans UK's rehabilitation centres. On the beach is a cafe and beach for rock pooling at low tide.

Rottingdean is east of Ovingdean and has more history still. The first settled inhabitants of Rottingdean were the Neolithic people, arriving around 2500 BC. It later became famed for sea faring activities and primarily a centre for smuggling. Rottingdean is its own parish despite being with the Brighton and Hove boundary. Beacon Hill is a Local Nature Reserve (LNR) set up because of its pristine chalk grassland and archaeological features. A historic windmill is at the centre of the nature reserve.

Woodingdean is north of Ovingdean and east of the Brighton Racecourse. It was extensively developed during the 1950s and 1960s when most of the roads in the north-eastern and southern ends of the village were built. The name Woodingdean came from Woodendean (i.e. wooded valley) Farm which was situated in the south end of what is now Ovingdean. This farm existed from before 1714 until 1979. Perhaps the earliest farming settlement to be identified in the area was situated in Wick Bottom. It was here that the Wick Farm, later Warren Farm was situated.

==== East Brighton downland and undercliff path ====
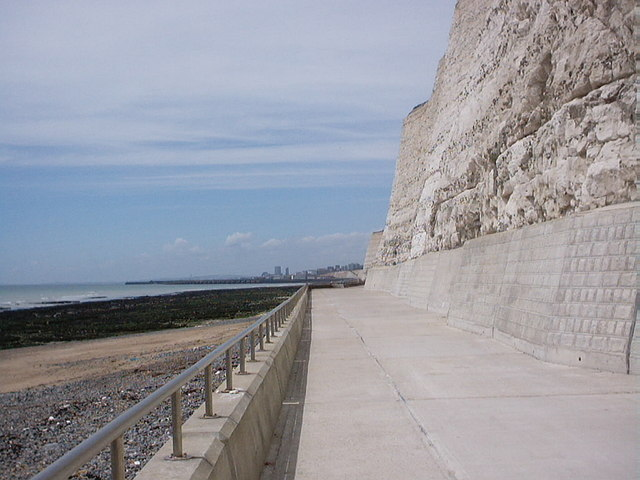
Undercliff path East of Brighton

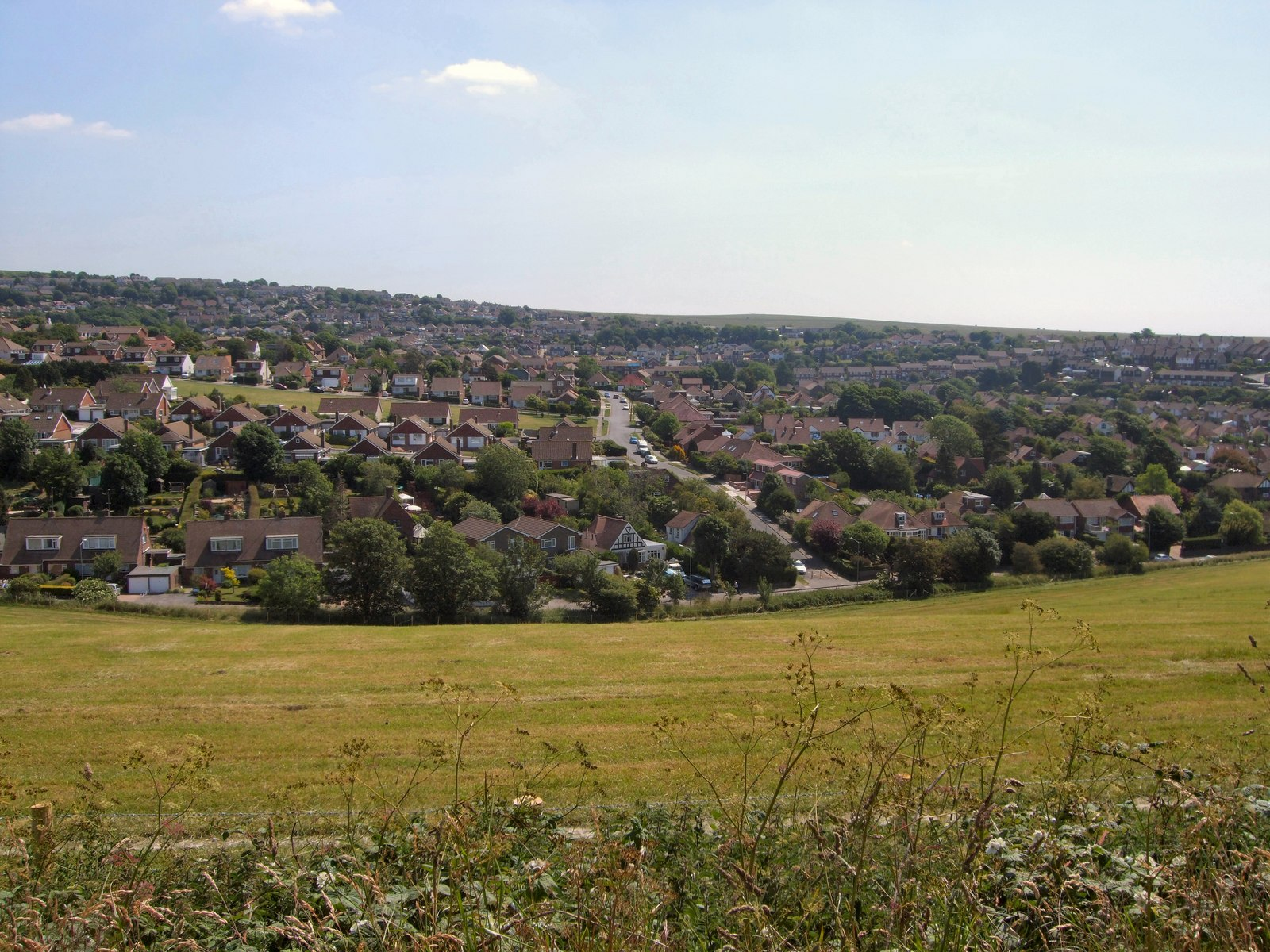
Happy Valley, Woodingdean

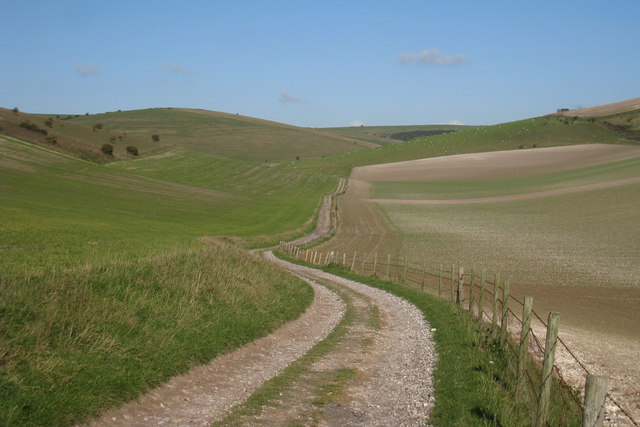
Track at The Bostle

Between the Brighton Marina and Saltdean is the undercliff path. It passes cafes at Ovingdean and Rottingdean. Many people use the path to walk, run or cycle either for amusement or to reach their destinations avoiding the up and down of the busy road above. The entire stretch of beach provides excellent home to rock pool loving species and sea and wading birds take advantage. Fulmars, peregrine falcons, ravens and rock pipits are just some of the bird life that nest in the chalk cliffs. This area is the only place on these southern cliffs that sea stock is native. Sea lavender also clings to the cliff ledges. Occasionally one can find samphire, too.

To the west of the Falmer Road from Woodingdean is Happy Valley (TQ 357 047), a scrub-covered, cattle-grazed slope supporting chalk grassland vegetation, including areas of gorse and thorn. Further down is Mount Pleasant (TQ 354 045). Its western slope overlooks Wick Bottom and contains a small area of species-rich chalk grassland. Plant species recorded there include round-headed rampion, dropwort, horseshoe vetch, and hairy violet. European stonechats are also found among the thorn and bramble.

Just east of Woodingdean, is the Bostle barrow field (TQ 371 054). There is a cluster of at least twenty-seven small low grassy mounds, which are probably Saxon, and three larger, probably Bronze Age barrows on the top of the hill just south of the bridleway fence line. The barrow field is a 'precious fragment' of antiquity surrounded by agricultural fields. The Bostle combe slope (TQ 371 048) is an ancient Down pasture slope with the softest sheep's fescue turf, just south of the barrow field.

East a little further there is one of the most special natural sites in the Brighton area, Castle Hill (TQ 376 065). The area is known for its early spider orchids, Roesel's bush-cricket, wart-biter grasshopper, and dramatic butterfly displays that include dark green fritillary, adonis blue and thousands of chalkhill blues.

=== The Brighton and Hove boundary ===
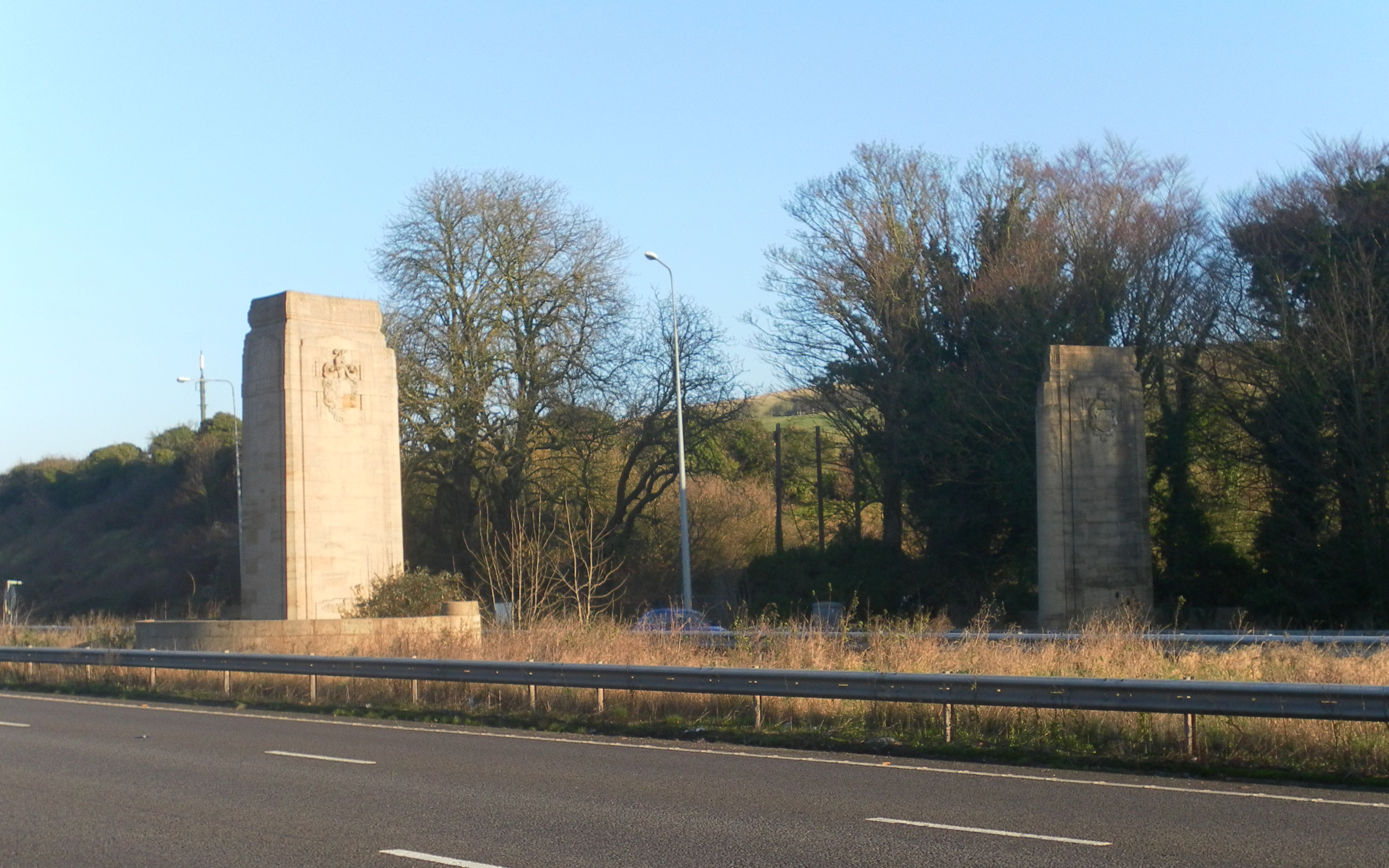
The Patcham Pylons mark the border of Brighton and Hove on the A23

From west to east the administrative boundary of Brighton and Hove begins on the coast at Gate 4 of Shoreham Port. It crosses the Southwick Ship Canal and the A259 between Brambledean Road and St Richard's Road in Portslade. From here, the border joins Eastbrook Road, and runs north up St Aubrey's Crescent. It then runs along the Sussex Border Path, through Fishersgate Station, separating Portslade from the neighbouring town of Southwick. Running west of Mile Oak, the border crosses the A27 skirting Mile Oak Farm and continues towards Devil's Dyke, before turning east over the downs. The border then extends north from Tydell Farm to the outskirts of Pyecombe – its most northerly point. It crosses the A23 at the Patcham Pylons, which signifies the border for incoming traffic.

Continuing east, the border runs north of the Chattri and Standean Farm, before crossing Ditchling Road at the Upper Lodges and running along the northerly limits of Stanmer Park and village. At this point, the border turns south and runs to the eastern edge of the University of Sussex campus, re-crossing the A27 along The Drove and passing east of Falmer Stadium. It continues along The Drove and Falmer Road to Woodingdean. Running north of Woodingdean, the border then heads southeast through Balsdean before adjoining to a footpath which enters Saltdean at the top of Longridge Avenue. The border runs down Longridge Avenue to the junction with Lynwood Road, where it turns south over houses and back across the A259 before returning the coastline at the eastern end of Saltdean Beach.

== Governance ==
As a unitary authority, Brighton and Hove City Council provides local government services, combining the functions of a non-metropolitan county and district council. Elections to the council are held every four years, with the most recent taking place in 2019. Councillors annually elect a Mayor of Brighton and Hove – a ceremonial position. The current mayor is Councillor Amanda Grimshaw. A proposal to introduce a directly elected mayor to the city was rejected by referendum in 2001. As a result, the council uses a cabinet system to form its executive. Jess Gibbons is the current chief executive. Both Brighton Town Hall in The Lanes, and Hove Town Hall on Church Road are used as meeting places for council.

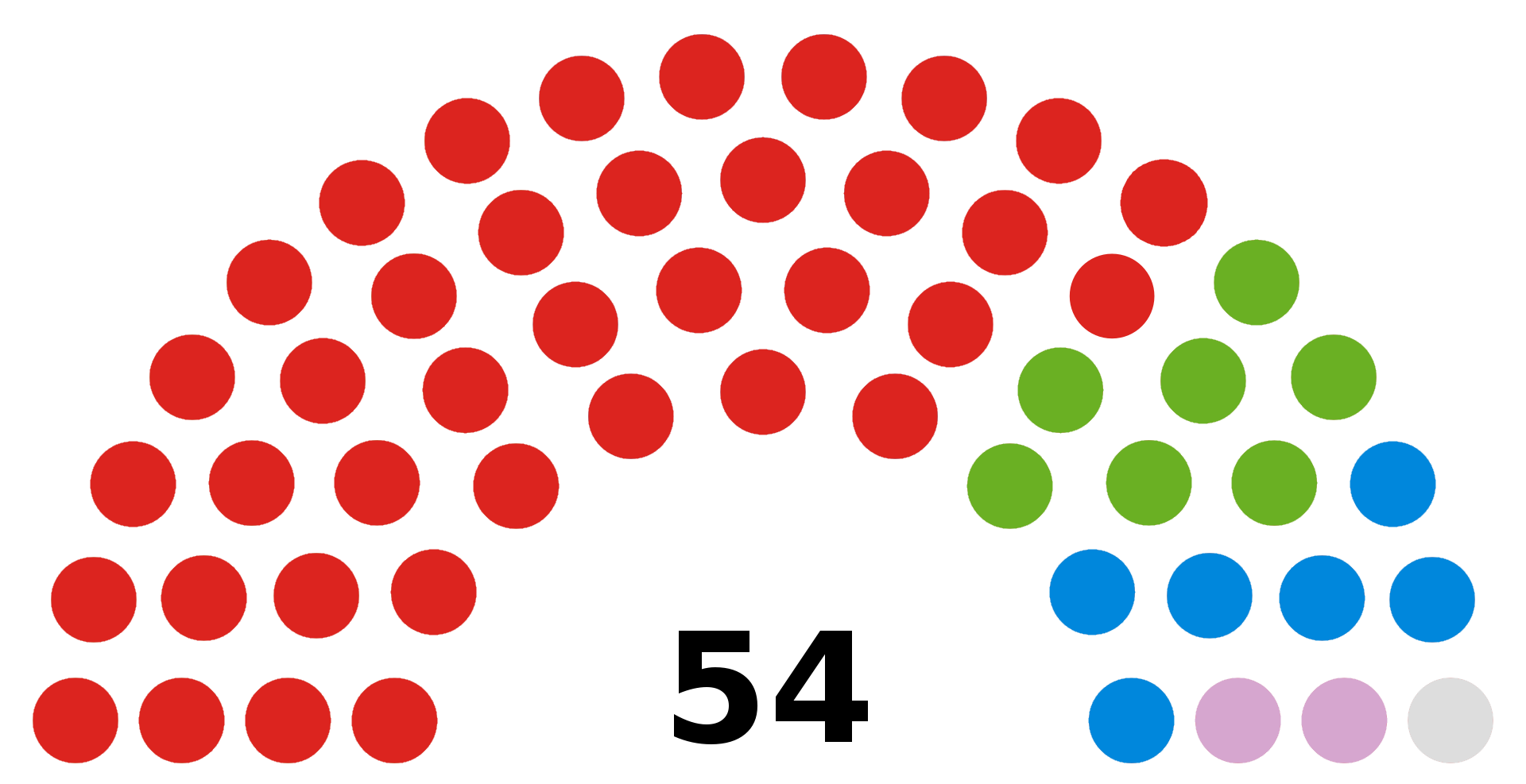
The council is currently composed of 38 Labour, 7 Green, 6 Conservative and 3 independent councillors

The council was under Labour majority control until the 2003 election, when it fell into no overall control until 2023. During this period the council has been controlled by minority administrations of all three major parties in Brighton and Hove: Labour, the Conservatives and the Greens. The first Green administration, elected in 2011, was the first time any Green Party had run a council in the UK, highlighting the city as the party's primary area of support. A Labour administration was elected in 2015, and the party narrowly retained a plurality in 2019, however expulsions from the Labour group led to the Greens regaining control of the administration in 2020. At the 2023 local elections, Labour regained control of the council. Bella Sankey is the current leader of the council.

Three constituencies cover Brighton and Hove in the UK Parliament. Hove is represented by Labour MP Peter Kyle. Brighton Pavilion, which covers central and northern Brighton, was represented by Green MP Caroline Lucas – the UK's first and, until the 2024 election, only, MP from the Green Party. In 2024 Lucas stood down and was replaced by another member of the Green Party, Siân Berry. Brighton Kemptown, which covers East Brighton, as well as areas outside of Brighton and Hove, such as Telscombe Cliffs and Peacehaven, is represented by Labour MP Chris Ward.

=== Wards ===
Ward	Location	Population (2021)
Brunswick and Adelaide		9,916
Central Hove		9,319
East Brighton		14,230
Goldsmid		15,857
Hangleton and Knoll		15,227
Hanover and Elm Grove		16,014
Hollingdean and Stamner		16,878
Hove Park		11,072
Moulsecoombe and Bevendean		16,887
North Portslade		10,129
Patcham		14,505
Preston Park		14,999
Queens Park		15,646
Regency		9,953
Rottingdean Coastal		14,293
South Portslade		9,895
St Peter's and North Laine		17,669
Westbourne		9,785
Wish		10,333
Withdean		14,721
Woodingdean		9,773

== Economy and demography ==
Population pyramid of Brighton and Hove in 2021

The economy of the city is service-based with a strong emphasis on creative, digital and electronic technologies. Tourism and entertainment are important sectors for the city, which has many hotels and amusements, as well as Brighton Pier and Shoreham/Portslade Harbour.

The 2011 United Kingdom census showed a substantial fall in the proportion of the population claiming Jobseeker's Allowance or Income Support, from 10.1% of the resident population in 2001, to 4.5% of the resident population in 2011.

The first census of Brighton was in 1801. The resident population of Brighton and Hove at the 2021 census was 277,100 persons, 49% male and 51% female.

=== Ethnicity ===
The 2021 census found the ethnic composition of Brighton and Hove to be 85.4% White, 4.8% Asian, 4.8% Mixed/Multiple Ethinicity, 2% Black, and 3.1% Other ethnic group.

Ethnic Group	Year							
Ethnic Group	1991		2001		2011		2021	
Ethnic Group	Number	%	Number	%	Number	%	Number	%
White: Total	221,767	96.9%	233,582	94.3%	243,512	89.1%	236,571	85.4%
White: British	–	–	218,134	88%	220,018	80.5%	204,831	73.9%
White: Irish	–	–	3,965		3,772		3,944	1.4%
White: Gypsy or Irish Traveller	–	–	–	–	198		197	0.1%
White: Roma							787	0.3%
White: Other	–	–	11,483	4.6%	19,524	7.1%	26,812	9.7%
Asian or Asian British: Total	3,845	1.7%	5,844	2.4%	11,278	4.1%	13,217	4.7%
Asian or Asian British: Indian	1,241		2,106		2,996		3,633	1.3%
Asian or Asian British: Pakistani	283		540		649		929	0.3%
Asian or Asian British: Bangladeshi	465		975		1,367		1,729	0.6%
Asian or Asian British: Chinese	965		1,305		2,999		3,065	1.1%
Asian or Asian British: Other Asian	891		918		3,267		3,861	1.4%
Black or Black British: Total	1,343	0.6%	1,992	0.8%	4,188	1.5%	5,458	2%
Black or Black British: African	562		1,380		2,893		3,949	1.4%
Black or Black British: Caribbean	323		468		879		988	0.4%
Black or Black British: Other Black	458		144		416		521	0.2%
Mixed or British Mixed: Total	–	–	4,799	1.9%	10,408	3.8%	13,228	4.7%
Mixed: White and Black Caribbean	–	–	834		2,182		2,410	0.9%
Mixed: White and Black African	–	–	961		2,019		2,334	0.8%
Mixed: White and Asian	–	–	1,582		3,351		4,198	1.5%
Mixed: Other Mixed	–	–	1,422		2,856		4,286	1.5%
Other: Total	2,017	1%	1,600	0.6%	3,983	1.5%	8,629	3.1%
Other: Arab	–	–	–	–	2,184	0.8%	3,049	1.1%
Other: Any other ethnic group	2,017	1%	1,600	0.6%	1,799	0.6%	5,580	2.0%
Total	228,972	100%	247,817	100%	273,369	100%	277,103	100%

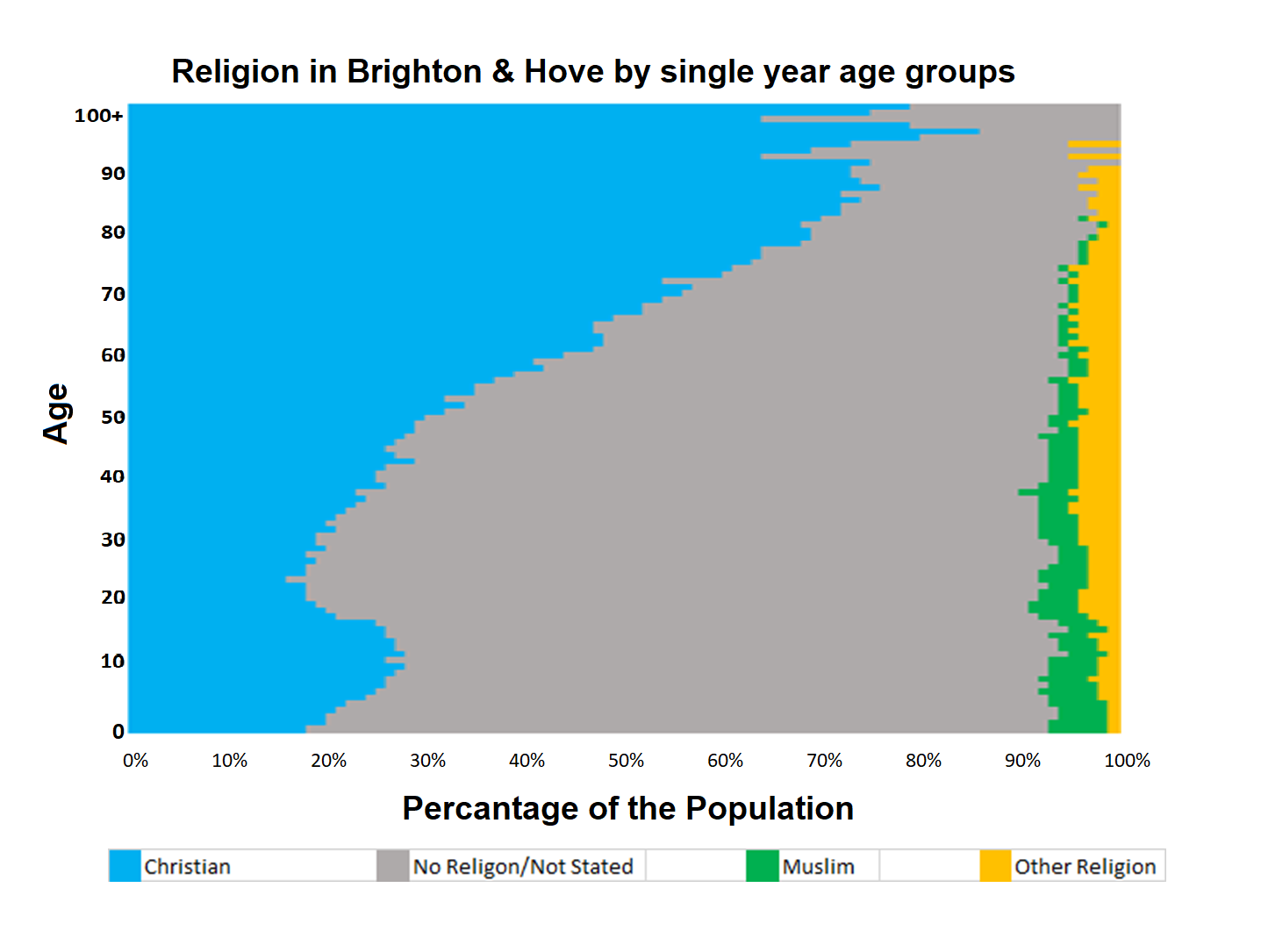
Religious makeup of Brighton & Hove by single year age groups in 2021

=== Religion ===
The 2021 census found the religious composition to be 55.2% nonreligious, 30.9% Christian, 3.1% Muslim, 0.9% Buddhist, and 0.9% Jewish. 1% were adherents of some other religion, while 7.1% did not answer the question.

In the 2001 census, Brighton and Hove had the highest percentage of citizens indicating their religion Jedi among all principal areas of England and Wales.

Religion	2001		2011		2021	
Religion	Number	%	Number	%	Number	%
No religion	66,955	27.0	115,954	42.4	152,966	55.2
Holds religious beliefs	158,849	64.1	133,326	48.8	104,377	37.7
Christian	146,466	59.1	117,276	42.9	85,629	30.9
Buddhist	1,747	0.7	2,742	1.0	2,455	0.9
Hindu	1,300	0.5	1,792	0.7	2,100	0.8
Jewish	3,358	1.4	2,670	1.0	2,455	0.9
Muslim	3,635	1.5	6,095	2.2	8,500	3.1
Sikh	237	0.1	342	0.1	378	0.1
Other religion	2,106	0.8	2,409	0.9	2,860	1.0
Religion not stated	22,013	8.9	24,089	8.8	19,760	7.1
Total population	247,817	100.0	273,369	100.0	277,103	100.0

== Media ==
- BBC Radio Sussex broadcast from its studios on Queens Road in Brighton.
- Local TV coverage is provided by BBC South East Today based in Tunbridge Wells and ITV News Meridian for the South Coast.
- Television signals in the area are received from the Whitehawk Hill transmitting station which is situated east of Brighton.
- Brighton and Hove Independent from SussexWorld
- The Argus
- Brighton Herald was the first newspaper, published from 6 September 1806 to 30 September 1971, then absorbed by the Brighton and Hove Gazette.
- Brighton and Hove Gazette
- Brighton Gazette, a weekly newspaper was published in 1821 until 1985, when it was absorbed into a free weekly, the Brighton and Hove Leader.
- Brighton and Hove Leader
- Brighton and Hove Herald
- Brighton and Hove News, a news website, launched in 2009, since 2017, a member of the Independent Community News Network.

== Freedom of the City ==
The following have received the Freedom of the City of Brighton and Hove.

=== Individuals ===
- Adam Trimingham: 30 September 2004.
- Henry Allingham: 30 April 2009.
- Flt Lt Marc Heal: 19 May 2011.
- Aung San Suu Kyi: 19 May 2011. Revoked 19 October 2023.
- Steve Ovett: 24 July 2012.
- Roger French: 9 May 2013.
- Dick Knight: 12 December 2013.
- Tony Bloom: 18 May 2017.
- Chris Hughton: 18 May 2017.
- Sir Peter Field: 15 July 2021.
- Mary Jane Clarke 14 December 2023.

=== Military units ===
- The Royal Sussex Regiment: 27 October 1944. (Borough of Brighton).
- The Royal Sussex Regiment: 1958. (Borough of Hove).
- The Queen's Regiment: 31 December 1966. (Borough of Brighton).
- The Princess of Wales's Royal Regiment: 1996.

=== Organisations and groups ===
- "All those who helped during the COVID-19 pandemic": 15 July 2021.
- Brighton & Hove Albion Football Club: 28 November 2023.

== See also ==
- Healthcare in Sussex
- Pipe organs of Brighton and Hove
