= Beacon Hill, East Sussex =

Park in East Sussex, United Kingdom

Beacon Hill
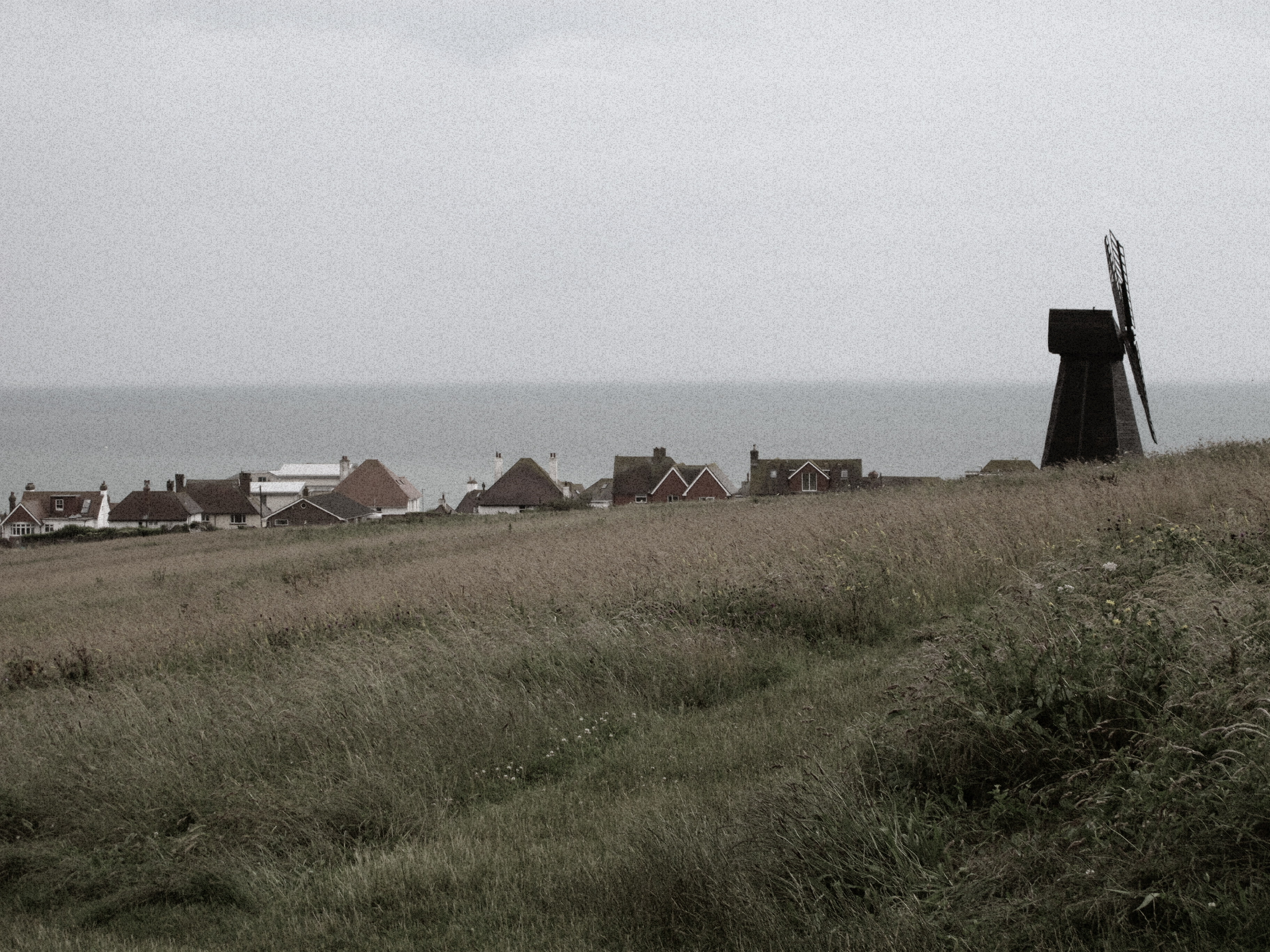
- Rottingdean Windmill
- Interactive map of Beacon Hill
- Type: Local Nature Reserve
- Location: Rottingdean, East Sussex
- Area: 18.6 hectares (46 acres)
- Elevation: 216 ft (66 m)
- Manager: Brighton and Hove Council

Beacon Hill is an 18.6-hectare (46-acre) Local Nature Reserve in Rottingdean, on the eastern outskirts of Brighton in East Sussex. It is owned and managed by Brighton and Hove Council.

== Geography ==
This chalk grassland site has extensive views out to sea and inland. Flora include round-headed rampion, vetches, wild thyme and several species of orchid, while there are birds such as skylarks. Rottingdean Windmill is a grade II listed building towards the south of the site.

== History ==
Beacon Hill has been grazed chalk grassland for at least six thousand years, like the rest of the South Downs. In all those years, affinities with the Downs could be drawn with great range-grazed pastures of the steppes that stretched from Hungary eastwards all the way to Mongolia, or with the American prairies and pampas. In these grazed environments there is great biodiversity of species. The key difference between the South Downs and those habitats is that grazing has been maintained by human intervention by means of sheep farming. Grazed chalk grasslands have been likened to a rainforest in miniature due to the small flowers that compete to survive on the low nutrient soils and the animals this wide range of flora supports.

Unfortunately, due to changes in farming practices and use of the land since the Second World War, in most places the South Downs is no longer sheep grazed and much of the land has been ploughed and had fertiliser and pesticides added. Beacon Hill however has been preserved and is currently managed to protect the grazed chalk grassland habitat and the many habitat and the many species that have evolved to live on it. As a result of the people working to preserve this area, Beacon Hill won the Royal Horticultural Society's (RHS) Britain in Bloom Conservation & Environment award in 2005 and the RHS Bloomin' Wild Discretionary award in 2007.

Within the site is the historic Rottingdean Windmill. The Windmill was built in 1803 and is opened to the public over some weekends during the summer months.

Beacon Hill was designated a Local Nature Reserve in 2004. Other designated chalk grassland LNR around Brighton and Hove include Benfield Hill, Bevendean Down, Ladies Mile and Whitehawk Hill. Nearby is also the National Nature Reserve of Castle Hill.
