= Benfield Hill =

Nature reserve in East Sussex, England

Coordinates: 50.855°N 0.210°W

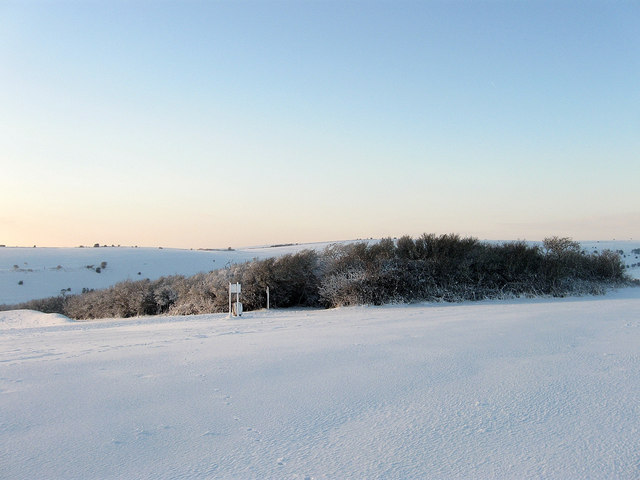
- Snow-covered Benfield Hill in January 2010
- Interactive map of Benfield Hill
- Type: Local Nature Reserve
- Location: Hove, East Sussex
- OS grid: TQ 261 077
- Area: 11.8 hectares (29 acres)
- Manager: Brighton and Hove City Council

Benfield Hill is an 11.8-hectare (29-acre) Local Nature Reserve (LNR) on the northern outskirts of Hove in East Sussex and is within the boundaries of the South Downs National Park. It is owned and managed by Brighton and Hove City Council.

== Geography ==
The site lies between Brighton and Hove to the South and the Downs escarpment to the North. The Benfield Hill ridgeline itself runs between two dry valleys in the Upper and Middle Chalk. Wildlife of interest in the area include Glow-worms, Small Blue butterfly, Field fleawort and many other chalk grassland specialists. Two public rights of way run through the site: a public footpath crosses north-south over the brow and a bridleway runs along the bottom east slope.

== History ==
Like the rest of the South Downs, Benfield Hill was used for sheep farming for 6000 years. The result was the creation of a hugely biodiverse chalk grassland, which biologist call a rainforest in miniature because of the forty or so different flowers that can be found in a square metre. Unfortunately, since the second world war most areas of the Downs are now intensively farmed and the rich wildlife these areas once supported has now gone. However, unlike other areas, the rich, grazed, biodiverse chalk grassland of Benfield Hill has been maintained by the Benfield Wildlife and Conservation group, which was set up in 1991. Benfield Hill was designated as a Local Nature Reserve in 1993 as a result of their work and because the area has not been ploughed, fertilised or had pesticides added like the surrounding fields.

The small area is one of only a few surviving remnants of pristine chalk grassland on the South Downs, despite the Downs geography, history and designation as National Park. Benfield Hill was designated a Local Nature Reserve in 1993. Other designated chalk grassland LNR around Brighton and Hove include Beacon Hill, Bevendean Down, Ladies Mile and Whitehawk Hill. Designated chalk grassland Sites of Special Scientific Interest in and around Brighton and Hove include the steep slopes of Clayton to Upper Beeding Escarpment, Beeding Hill to Newtimber Hiil and Castle Hill.

== Conservation ==
Members of the active Benfield Wildlife and Conservation Group run activities on the Reserve each year such as guided walks and picnics. There is a good working relationship with all the tenants of Benfield Valley and West Hove golf clubs. This relationship has allowed the shared grazing of the reserve and parts of the golf courses.

Immediately to south of the A27 is a Local Wildlife Site known as Benfield Valley. It is an important corridor for nature and recreation within the Brighton and Hove metropolis. It has been threatened by planning proposals for housing, which the locals have successfully contested.
