= Ladies Mile, Brighton =

Nature reserve in East Sussex, England

Coordinates: 50.868°N 0.13°W

Ladies Mile
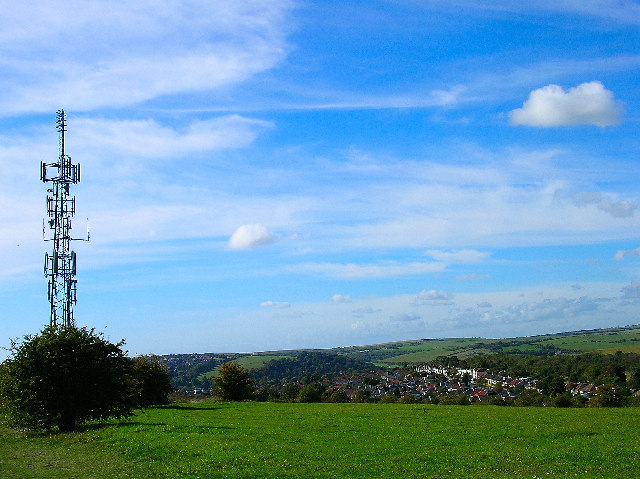
- Interactive map of Ladies Mile
- Type: Local Nature Reserve
- Location: Brighton, East Sussex
- OS grid: TQ 317 093
- Area: 13.6 hectares (34 acres)
- Manager: Brighton and Hove City Council

Ladies Mile (TQ 318 093) is a 13.6-hectare (34-acre) Local Nature Reserve to the east of Patcham, on the northern outskirts of Brighton in East Sussex. The area was designated in 2003 and is owned and managed by Brighton and Hove City Council.

== Geography ==
Ladies Mile is a remarkable survival of plateau chalk grassland on Downland where almost all such flattish sites have been allocated to modern farming. Grazed chalk grassland is internationally significant and in this area of the world has been created by hundreds of years of sheep farming. Around 80% of chalk grassland in Britain has been lost. Where it has been saved, it is usually on steep slopes that ploughs cannot reach.

During the summer months, the grassland of Ladies Mile is rich in flowers and has extensive areas of horseshoe vetch and kidney vetch. Harebell, Sussex rampion flower, rockrose and yellow rattle are enjoyed by locals here and at midsummer there are still good numbers of glowworms. Later in the summer months the violet-blue of devil’s-bit scabious and the powder-blue lesser scabious radiate. There are also areas of scrub and a wood at the southern end.

There is access from Ladies Mile Road.

== History ==
Ladies Mile once was the site of a Bronze Age round houses and burial mounds, Celtic/Roman field systems, a Victorian era ride for women to exercise their horses, and during the Second World War had anti glider trenches. As a result the ancient turf of Ladies Mile was preserved and there are lots of odd linear banks which are surviving fragments of its past. The banks once stretched across the line of the bypass, beyond which one or two more fragments also survive. At the eastern end of the Down, the Bronze Age burial mound is recognisable only by a low, grassy tump.

In 2003 Ladies Mile was designated a Local Nature Reserve as a consequence of its chalk grassland and all biodiversity such areas support. Nearby is the National Nature Reserve of Castle Hill. Other chalk grassland LNR around Brighton and Hove include Beacon Hill, Benfield Hill, Bevendean Down and Whitehawk Hill.
