= Kondratiev =

Kondratiev, Kondratyev or Kondratieff (Russian: Кондратьев) is a Slavic surname (feminine form: Kondratieva or Kondratyeva, Russian: Кондратьева) derived from the given name Kondraty. People of this name include:

- Adelina Kondrátieva (1917–2012), Argentine-born Russian translator and Brigadista
- Alexei Kondratiev (1949–2010), American scholar specializing in Celtic languages and cultures
- Dmitri Kondratyev (born 1969), cosmonaut
- Georgi Kondratiev (born 1960), footballer
- Georgy Mihailovich Kondratiev (1887–1958), Russian physicist
- Ivan Kondratyev (1849–1904), Russian poet and writer
- Kirill Kondratyev (1920–2006), Russian atmospheric physicist
- Lyudmila Kondratyeva (born 1958), Russian sprinter and 1980 Olympic champion
- Maria Kondratieva (born 1982), Russian tennis player
- Maxim Kondratyev (born 1983), Russian ice-hockey player
- Nataliya Kondratyeva (born 1986), Russian judoka
- Nikolai Kondratiev (1892–1938), Russian economist who researched Kondratiev waves
- Oksana Kondratyeva (born 1985), Russian hammer thrower, daughter of Lyudmila
- Sergei Kondratyev (born 1990), Belarusian football player
- Veniamin Kondratyev (born 1970), governor of Krasnodar Krai
- Vladyslav Kondratyev (born 1990), Ukrainian basketball player
- Yekaterina Kondratyeva (born 1982), Russian sprinter
- Yuri Kondratiev (born 1953), Ukrainian mathematician
