= Kondraty (name) =

Kondraty (Russian: Кондра́тий, also transcribed Kondratiy; Ukrainian: Кіндратій, romanized: Kindratii) is an East Slavic given name derived from Greek Κοδράτος, the name of several Christian saints, which itself derives from the Latin name Quadratus. The popular unsuffixed form is Kondrat (Russian: Кондра́т); Ukrainian has the form Kindrat (Кіндра́т), and Belarusian, Kandrat (Кандра́т). Patronymic surnames derived from the name include Kondratyuk, Kondratiev, Kondratenko.

Notable people with the name include:

- Kondraty Bulavin (1667–1708), leader of the Bulavin Rebellion in Russia
- Kondraty Efimovich (1815–1847), Russian playwright and theatre critic
- Kondraty Korsalin (1809–1883), Belarusian portraitist
- Kondrat Krapiva (1896–1991), Belarusian poet
- Kondraty Ryleyev (1795–1826), Russian poet and a leader of the Decembrist Revolt
- Kondraty Selivanov (1730/40–1832), founder of the Russian Skoptsy sect
