= Balsdean =

Abandoned hamlet in East Sussex, England

Coordinates: 50.820°N 0.046°W

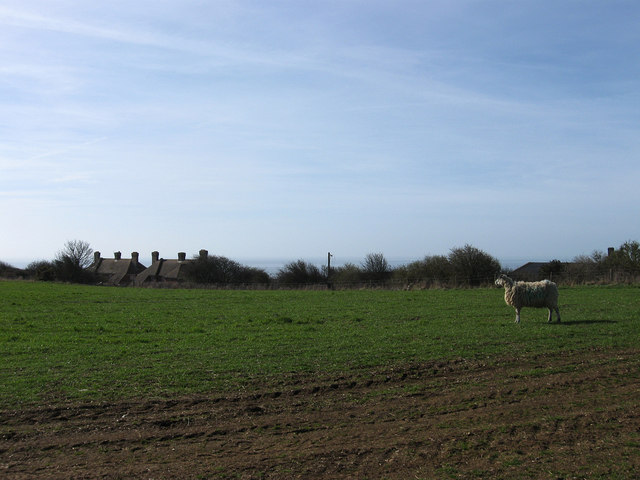
Balsdean

Balsdean is a deserted hamlet in a remote downland valley east of Brighton, East Sussex, England, on record since about 1100. It was formerly a chapelry of the parish of Rottingdean, and its territory touched that of the mother parish only at a single point. Despite its remoteness, it falls within the boundaries of the city of Brighton and Hove.

The valley of Balsdean is the most reliable migration stopover in Sussex of the rare Arctic and high mountain breeding wader the dotterel. The flinty fields are thought to resemble its mountain breeding grounds.

== History ==
=== Bronze Age ===
The nearby hill known as the Bostle is the site of a Bronze Age cemetery consisting of a group of three large Bronze Barrows, with other barrows located nearby.

=== Roman ===
Roman occupation of the neighbourhood has been recorded by two notable finds. In 1757 a Roman dagger was found in a tumulus at Balsdean. In 1798 a stoneware urn or jar was unearthed, containing upwards of a thousand Roman copper coins. Some were faintly plated, or washed, with silver, and they were so little damaged that their relief remained perfectly sharp. Therefore, they could not have been much, if at all, in circulation. They were of the time of Valerian, who reigned AD 225, Gallienus, Claudius, Quintilius, Posthumus, Victorinus, Marius, and Tetricus.

=== Saxon ===
An Anglo-Saxon barrow cemetery consisting of 27 early Anglo-Saxon barrows have been recorded in the vicinity of the Bronze Age cemetery on The Bostle.

=== Medieval ===
Balsdean was a hamlet, which consisted of two farms, Norton and Sutton, more generally known as Norton and Balsdean.

=== Later history ===
Norton farm was used as a lunatic asylum in the early nineteenth century: by the twentieth century it had become uninhabited. Balsdean Manor house and two workers' cottages were inhabited until the Second World War, when the population was evacuated and the buildings were used for target practice by Allied artillery. These buildings, including the medieval chapel by then used as a barn, were never rebuilt and the people never returned. The only building still remaining is a derelict post-war barn complex.

There is a modern farm named after the original Balsdean Farm on the fringe of Rottingdean, and from there most of the ancient farmlands of Balsdean are still worked. Part of the original sheepdown is now protected by the Castle Hill Site of Special Scientific Interest. Much of the former sheepdown, however, is now the site of the Brighton suburb of Woodingdean, the building of which started around 1918.
