= Bevendean =

District of Brighton and Hove, England

Coordinates: 50.8414°N 0.1021°W

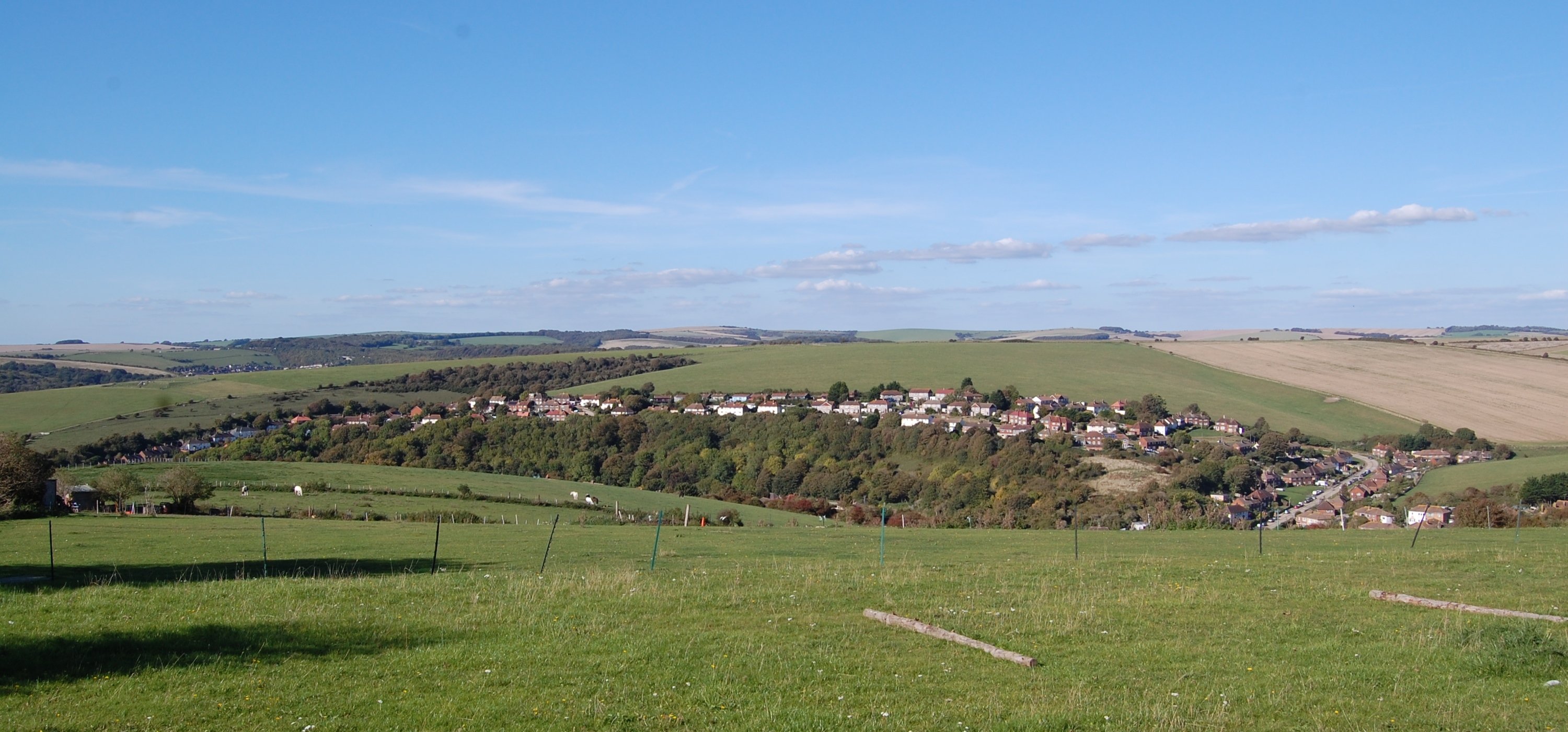

- Location within East Sussex
- Unitary authority: Brighton & Hove
- Ceremonial county: East Sussex
- Region: South East
- Country: England
- Sovereign state: United Kingdom
- Post town: BRIGHTON
- Postcode district: BN2 4
- Dialling code: 01273
- Police: Sussex
- Fire: East Sussex
- Ambulance: South East Coast
- UK Parliament: Brighton Kemptown & Peacehaven

Bevendean is a district of the city of Brighton and Hove, in East Sussex, England.

The estate lies to the north-east of central Brighton, and was largely developed after World War II with a mixture of council housing and private development. A large proportion of the properties are council houses. The area has limited local facilities and there is only one road access route into and out of the area.

The manor of Bevendean was recorded in the Domesday Book of 1086. The name is derived from 'Beofa's valley'. It was later divided into two estates, Upper Bevendean on the hill and Lower Bevendean in the valley. Some housing development began in the 1930s, with the population expanding rapidly from 1948 onwards. An industrial estate was developed from the mid-1950s.

The two local churches are: the Church of the Holy Nativity, built in 1963 as a Modern-style building in brick by architect Reginald Melhuish, ARIBA, and The Salvation Army - which occupies a building that was previously a Baptist Chapel built around 1950s. The local school is Bevendean Primary School, a community school that educates children from the range of 3 to 11.

The Bevy opened on 12 December 2014 making it the first co-operative pub on a housing estate in the UK.

== Notable areas ==
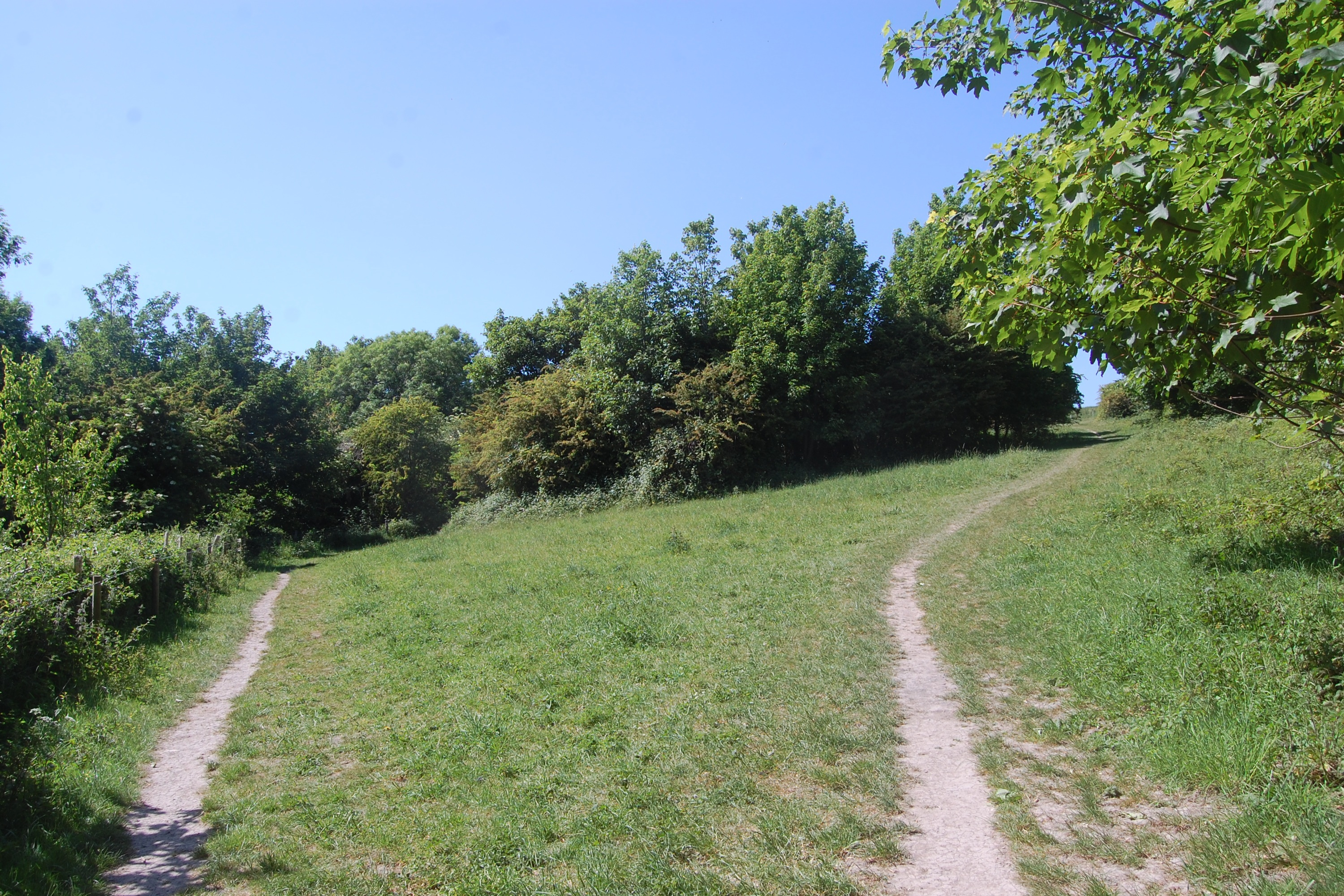
Bevendean Down (Local Nature Reserve)

Bevendean is in a valley and the South Downs which surround the valley offer views across the valley.

=== Bevendean Down ===
Bevendean Down, above Heath Hill Avenue and Norwich Drive, is known for its butterflies and in the area there have been key butterfly species including adonis blue, grizzled skipper, dingy skipper, small blue, green hairstreak, chalkhill blue, and dark green fritillary. Other species include common blue, marbled white, wall brown and small and large skippers.

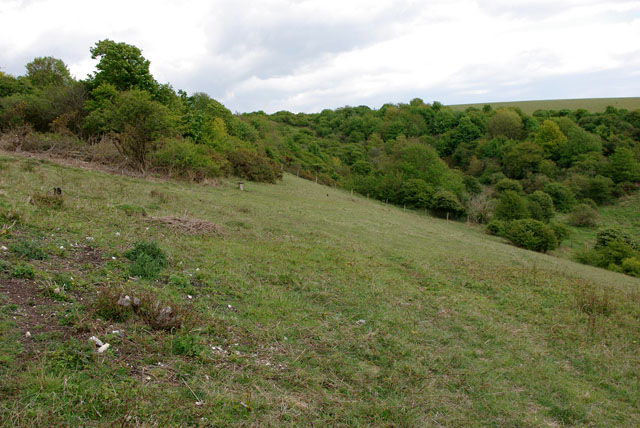
Hogtrough Bottom - grazed access downland

Hogtrough Bottom, is on the east slope of the Down and has a mixture of taller grasses, short sheep’s fescue turf and scrub. Some years on the shorter ground are large swarms of autumn ladies tresses. There are lots of scarce species such as bastard toadflax, waxcap and webcap fungi, four-spot orb-weaver and purseweb spiders, but David Bangs, Sussex field naturalists says, "the main delight is the tapestry of summer colours - purple knapweed and felwort, blue scabious, yellow hawkbit and rockrose".^{:293} The south slope of Bevendean Down and Hogtrough Bottom have been designated as a Local nature reserve.

Farther up the dean, beyond the Primary School, a woodland covers the slope between Norwich Drive and Heath Hill Avenue. Within the woodland lies Bevendean Bank, a glade name during the Victorian era. Local conservationists manage the site through regular mowing to prevent scrub encroachment. The area supports chalk grassland flora, butterfly species, and a population of purse-web spiders. The woodland forms part of a designated Local nature reserve alongside Bevendean and Hogtrough Bottom.

=== Heath and Race Hill ===
The south side of the Bevendean estate is a place of horse paddocks and scrub thickets, old allotment sites and cattle grazing. At the eastern end Upper Bevendean Farm (TQ 350 062) looks down from the higher slope. It was once one of many farms and an outlier of the old Bevendean Manor, which nestled in the valley where the Primary School now is. It has now become the only farm in the valley.

The hill running from Auckland Drive to Warren road is called Heath Hill (TQ 342 060) and as its name implies it was once a place of heather and gorse. in the past there were areas of old Down pasture on the hill (such as TQ 340 060) where great green bush-cricket were present in high summer, but these areas have returned in scrub and no longer support such diversity.

On Race Hill the paddocks around the Southdown Riding Stables (TQ 335 058) and Ingleside Stables, to the east, receive no agro-chemicals and have become rich in wildlife over the past half century. Swallows and swifts, bats and dung beetles, rooks and woodpeckers and the hornet robberfly all survive on the rich supply of insects attracted by the pony dung. Worryingly for those concerned by nature loss, both the farmsteads of Southdown's and Ingleside Stables are targeted for housing development within Brighton and Hove City Council's draft City Plan (Part 2). The loss of these two farmsteads, which organise the grazing and management of these nature-rich pastures, would put the pastures at risk.

== Cultural references ==
Bevendean is referenced in the chapter "The Baffling Business of the Bevendean Bat" of the fantasy novel The Brightonomicon.
