= Kondratyuk (disambiguation) =

Kondratyuk is a surname.

Kondratyuk may also refer to:

- Kondratyuk (crater), a lunar crater
- 3084 Kondratyuk, a main-belt asteroid
