= High Woods Country Park =

Country park in Colchester, Essex

Coordinates: 51°54′25″N 0°54′33″E

- Interactive map of High Woods Country Park
- Type: Country Park
- Location: High woods, Colchester, Essex
- OS grid: TL 999 268
- Area: 150 hectares (370 acres)
- Manager: Colchester City Council (Countryside Team)

High Woods Country Park, Highwoods Country Park or High Woods Park called by locals just as Highwoods Park, Highwoods or High Woods is a 150-hectare (370-acre) park in Colchester, Essex. It includes a children's play area and a visitor's centre selling refreshments, alongside natural marshes, lakes and woods. The park also contains a 2-acre (0.81 ha) public garden used to grow vegetables.

== History ==
The land that now forms High Woods was once part of the Royal Forest of Kingswood, a medieval hunting forest. In 1976, following a proposal to build a housing development adjacent to what would become the park, the Colchester City Council acquired a piece of land known as the "southern slopes" that was eventually amalgamated into the park boundaries. The park was opened to the public in 1987 after Colchester Borough Council acquired the land, with the site being converted to a country park, preventing further development. In December 2024, the Colchester City Council completed a £130,000 playground within the park, however it received criticism for being labelled as "accessible".

== Wildlife ==
=== Birds ===
Highwoods is home to a wide variety of birds such has European green woodpeckers, lesser spotted woodpeckers, great spotted woodpeckers. Barn owls, Eurasian treecreepers, mallards, common wood pigeons, Eurasian collared doves, Eurasian jays, Eurasian magpies, jackdaws, rooks, carrion crows, Eurasian blue tits, the decreasing great tits, Eurasian skylarks, sedge warblers, reed warblers, barn swallows, wood warblers, willow warblers, Cetti's warblers, Eurasian blackcaps, greater whitethroats, fieldfares, waxwings, redwings, Eurasian nuthatches, Eurasian wrens, common nightingales, common chaffinches, bramblings, dunnocks, Eurasian bullfinches, European greenfinches, European goldfinches, grey herons, common terns, great cormorants, coots and common moorhens.

Goosander arrive in the winter.

Common ravens have been spotted in Highwoods.

=== Fish ===
The lake of Highwoods has a wide variety of fish, such as common rudd, common roach, common carp and the critically endangered European eel

=== Mammals ===
Highwoods has lots of mammals, such as Reeves's muntjac, bank vole, Daubenton's bat, European rabbit, wood mouse, soprano pipistrelle and common pipistrelle.

=== Amphibians ===
The amphibians at Highwoods include common frog, common toad, common newt and palmate newt.

=== Reptiles ===
The reptiles of Highwoods include grass snake, common slow worm and common lizard.

=== Insects ===
Some insects found in Highwoods are Long-Winged conehead, White Admiral, Broad-bodied Chaser, Green hairstreak, European hornet, Large red damselfly, Emperor dragonfly, Narrow-bordered five-spot burnet, Gatekeeper, European stag beetle, Orange tip, Essex skipper, Meadow brown, Grasshoppers, Crickets, Red-eyed damselfly, Scarce emerald damselfly, Pond snails, and Aquatic beetle.

=== Arachnids ===
Some Arachnids in Highwoods are Wasp Spider, Araneus quadratus, Silver-sided sector spider and Noble false widow.
