= Bevendean Down =

UK nature reserve

Coordinates: 50.843°N 0.102°W

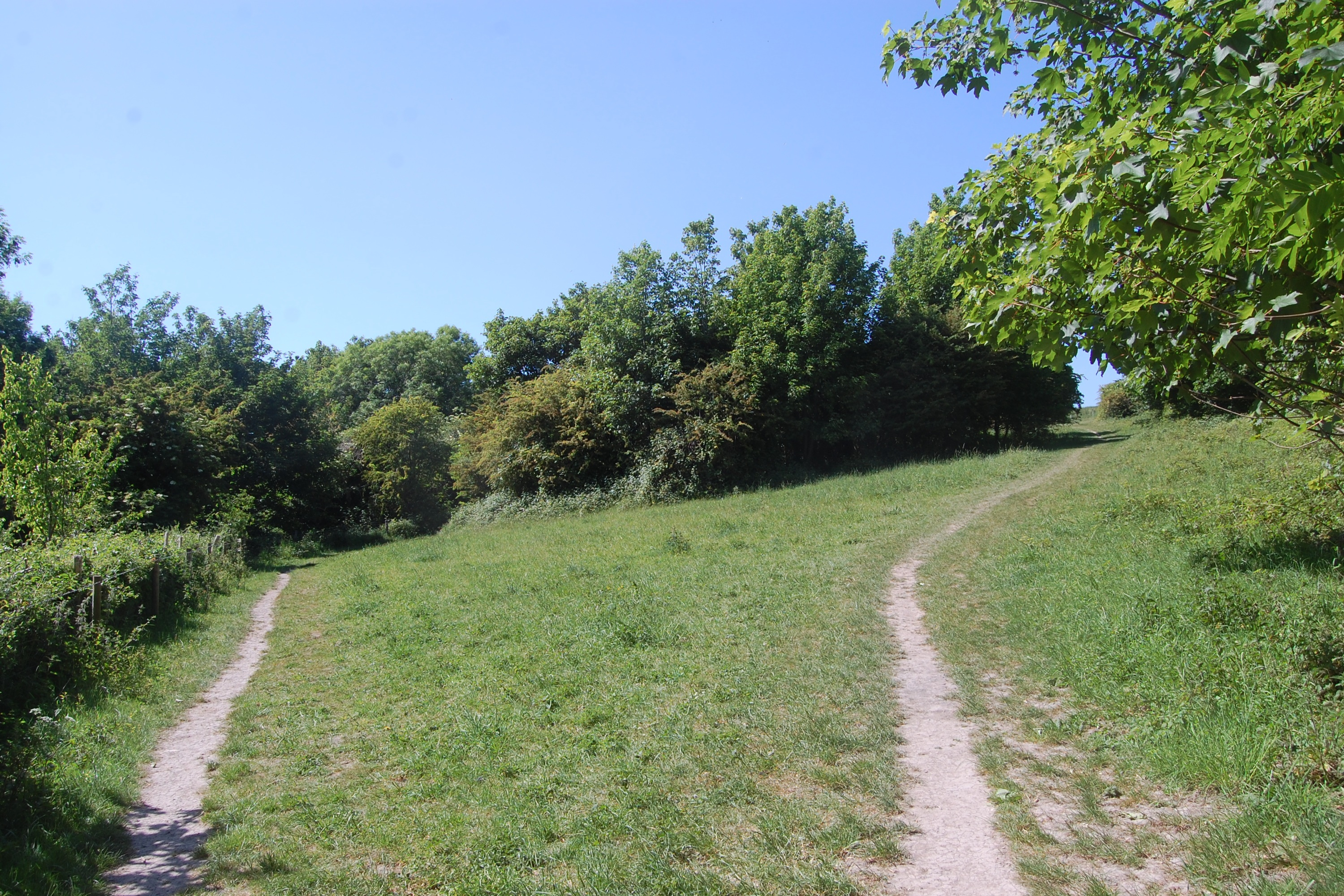
- Interactive map of Bevendean Down
- Type: Local Nature Reserve
- Location: Brighton, East Sussex
- OS grid: TQ 337 066
- Area: 64.6 hectares (160 acres)
- Manager: Tenant farmers and others

Bevendean Down is a 64.6-hectare (160-acre) Local Nature Reserve in the Bevendean district in Brighton, East Sussex and is within the boundaries of the South Downs National Park. It is owned by Brighton and Hove Council and managed by tenant farmers and others. It is mainly chalk grassland and there are also areas of woodland and scrub. This site is in five separate blocks.

== Bevendean Down and Hogtrough Bottom ==
Bevendean Down itself is above Heath Hill Avenue and Norwich Drive. Its south and east bank form one of block of the Local nature reserve. The southern area has a dew pond, a variety of orchids and insects such as the hornet robberfly. In the early 1900 it was famous for its butterflies and although the diversity is less it is still a good area for them. Many key chalkland species can be found there including adonis blue, grizzled skipper, dingy skipper, small blue, green hairstreak, chalkhill blue, and dark green fritillary. Other butterfly species that frequent the area are the common blue, marbled white, wall brown and small and large skippers.

The eastern bank is called Hogtrough Bottom and has a mixture of taller grasses, short sheep’s fescue turf and scrub. Some years on the shorter ground are large swarms of autumn ladies tresses. There are lots of scarce species such as bastard toadflax, waxcap and webcap fungi, four-spot orb-weaver and purseweb spiders, but David Bangs, Sussex field naturalists says, "the main delight is the tapestry of summer colours - purple knapweed and felwort, blue scabious, yellow hawkbit and rockrose".^{:293}

== Bevendean Bank ==
Another block of the Reserve is a wood on a slope between Norwich Drive and Heath Hill Avenue. Within the wood is a remarkable secret glade that the Victorians called Bevendean Bank. Local conservationists guard its precious turf, mowing and pushing back the ever encroaching wood. There are lots of old grassland flowers and butterflies and a large population of purse-web spider.

== Heath Hill, Race Hill and Race Valley ==
The hill running from Auckland Drive to Warren road is called Heath Hill (TQ 342 060) and as its name implies it was once a place of heather and gorse. The east and west of the Hill are part of the Bevendean LNR. In the past these were areas of old Down pasture on the hill where great green bush-cricket were present in high summer, but these areas have returned in scrub and due to the lack of management no longer support such diversity. The Brighton Permaculture Trust has created a community orchard on Race Hill.

Race Hill and Valley have paddocks that managed and grazed by the Southdown Riding Stables (TQ 335 058) and Inglesíde Stables. They have not received agro-chemicals since the 1950s and have become rich in wildlife. Swallows and swifts, bats and dung beetles, rooks and woodpecker and the troll-like hornet robberfly all survive on the rich supply of insects attracted by the pony dung. The farmsteads of Southdown's and Ingleside Stables are targeted for housing development within Brighton and Hove City Council's draft City Plan (Part 2).

== Hog Plantation ==
Hog Plantation combe (TQ 342 077) is a valley behind East Moulsecoomb and Falmer School. Despite its diversity, it is still rather a ‘secret’ site, which deserves far wider recognition. There has been massive scrub clearance, re-fencing and grazing by the tenant farmer with the Council. The slopes have a top fringe of gorse and thorn which host the scarce forester and yellow shell moths. In summer there are many butterflies such as the adonis, silver-spotted skipper and marbled white and the funny bishop’s mitre bug.

== Moulsecoombe Estate and Manton allotments and woods ==
Moulsecoombe Estate and Manton allotments and woods are the final block of Bevendean Down Local nature reserve.
