= Kondratyuk =

Kondratyuk or Kondratiuk (Ukrainian: Кондратюк)is a surname derived from the given name Kondraty. Notable people with the msurname include:

- Adrian Kondratiuk (born 1993), Polish handball player
- Andrzej Kondratiuk (1936–2016), Polish film director
- Bohdan Kondratyuk (born 1987), Ukrainian footballer
- Janusz Kondratiuk (1943–2019), Polish film director
- Mark Kondratiuk (born 2003), Russian figure skater
- Mykola Kondratyuk (1931–2006), Ukrainian singer
- Oleksandr Kondratyuk (born 1983), Ukrainian futsal player
- Olena Kondratiuk (born 1970), Ukrainian politician
- Petro Kondratyuk (born 1979), Ukrainian footballer
- Yuri Kondratyuk (1897–1942), Ukrainian scientist and pioneer of astronautics and spaceflight
