= Woodingdean Water Well =

Deepest hand-dug well in the world

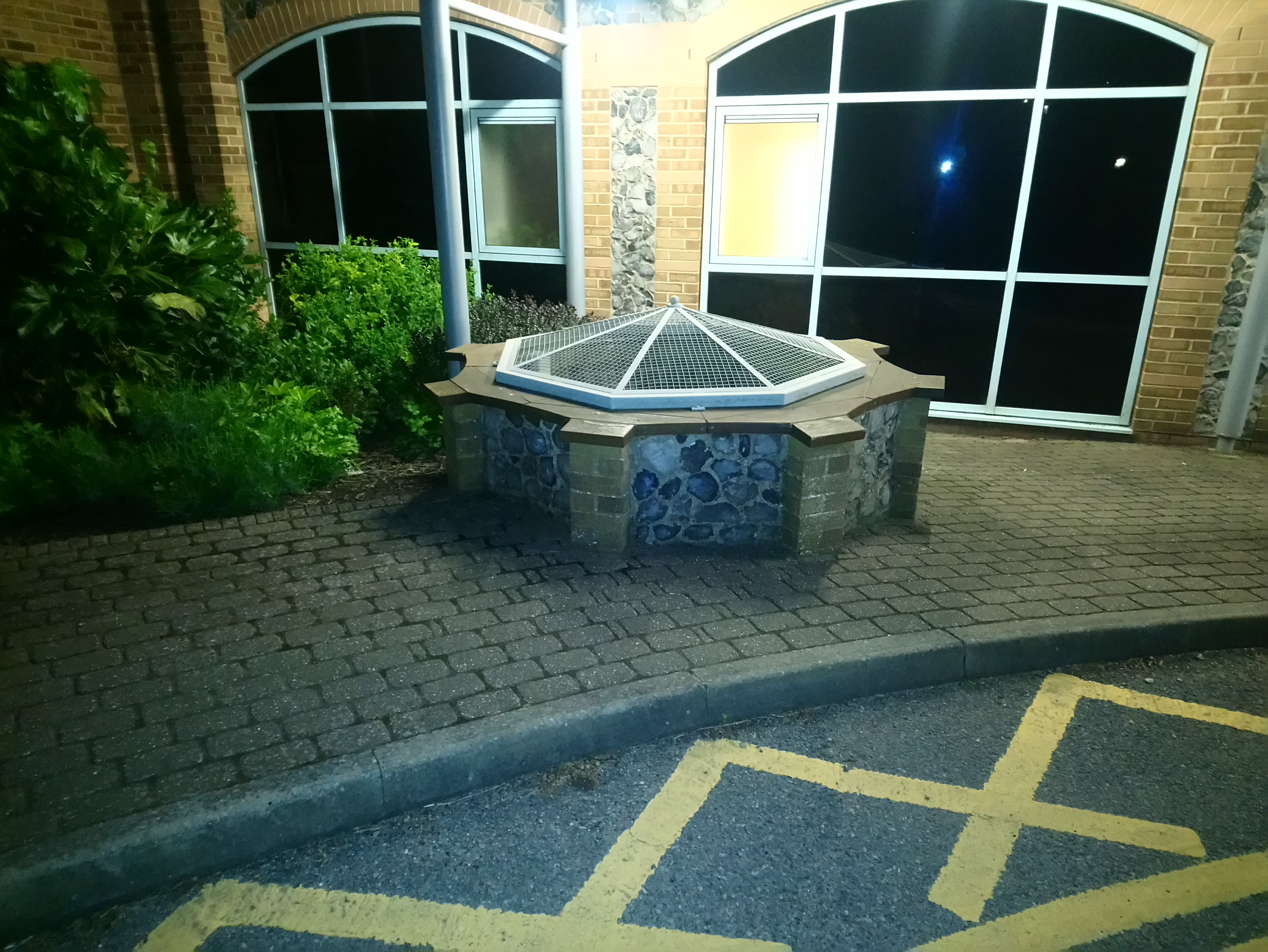
- Interactive map of the Woodingdean Water Well area

General information
- Type: Well
- Location: Nuffield Hospital, Woodingdean, England, United Kingdom, Brighton and Hove, United Kingdom
- Coordinates: 50°50′05″N 0°04′55″W
- Named for: Woodingdean
- Construction started: 1858
- Completed: 16 March 1862

Design and construction
- Known for: Deepest hand-dug well

The Woodingdean Water Well is the deepest hand-dug well in the world, at 390 metres (1,280 ft) deep, lined with some 278,000 bricks. It was dug to provide water for a workhouse.

Work on the well started in 1858, and was finished four years later, on 16 March 1862. It is located just outside the Nuffield Hospital in Woodingdean, in Brighton and Hove, England, United Kingdom.

Despite taking four years to construct, the well was only in use for a further four years until the workhouse was connected to the mains supply.

== In popular culture ==
The Woodingdean Water Well has been featured several times in the Itch series, by Simon Mayo, as it is where the protagonist, Itch, dumps the radioactive element 126.
