= Quadratus =

Quadratus is Latin for square. Quadratus was also a cognomen from the Roman Republic and Roman Empire. It may refer to:

== People ==
- Lucius Ninnius Quadratus, a tribune of the plebs in 58 BC and a warm friend to Roman Senator Marcus Tullius Cicero
- Gaius Volusenus Quadratus, a military officer of the late Roman Republic in 40s BC
- Fannius Quadratus, a Roman poet and a contemporary of Horace
- Gaius Antius Aulus Julius Quadratus, an ordinary consul serving in 105
- Quadratus of Athens, the Christian writer and saint
- Quadratus (martyr), the name of several saints and martyrs
- Lucius Statius Quadratus, an ordinary consul serving in 142
- Gaius Julius Quadratus Bassus, Legate at Judaea between 102 and 105, Consul of Rome in 105 and Proconsul of Asia in 105, grandfather of:
- Gaius Asinius Quadratus, the Roman historian, father of:
- Gaius Asinius Protimus Quadratus (died 235), Proconsul of Achaea in 220
- Any of various members of the Roman gens Ummidia

== Anatomy ==
In anatomy, quadratus refers to a quadrilateral (square or rectangular) shape. Structures with quadratus in their name are:

- Lobus quadratus, the quadrate lobe of liver
- Pronator quadratus muscle, in the forearm
- Quadratus femoris muscle, in the posterior hip
- Quadratus lumborum muscle, in the back
- Quadratus plantae muscle, in the foot

== See also ==
- Quadriceps
- The 2nd colossus from the video game Shadow of the Colossus
- Araneus quadratus, a species of spider
