= Kondratenko =

Kondratenko (Кондратéнко) is a Ukrainian surname derived from the given name Kondraty. Notable people with the surname include:

- Anatoli Kondratenko (born 1949), Soviet football striker
- Anatoly Kondratenko (born 1935), Ukrainian theoretical physicist
- Kateryna Kondratenko (born 1978), Ukrainian singer
- Masha Kondratenko (born 1999), Ukrainian singer and actress
- Nikolai Kondratenko (1940–2013), Russian politician
- Roman Kondratenko (1857–1904), Russian general
- Vasiliy Kondratenko (born 1989), Russian bobsledder
