= Beacon Mill, Rottingdean =

Historic smock mill in England

Rottingdean Windmill
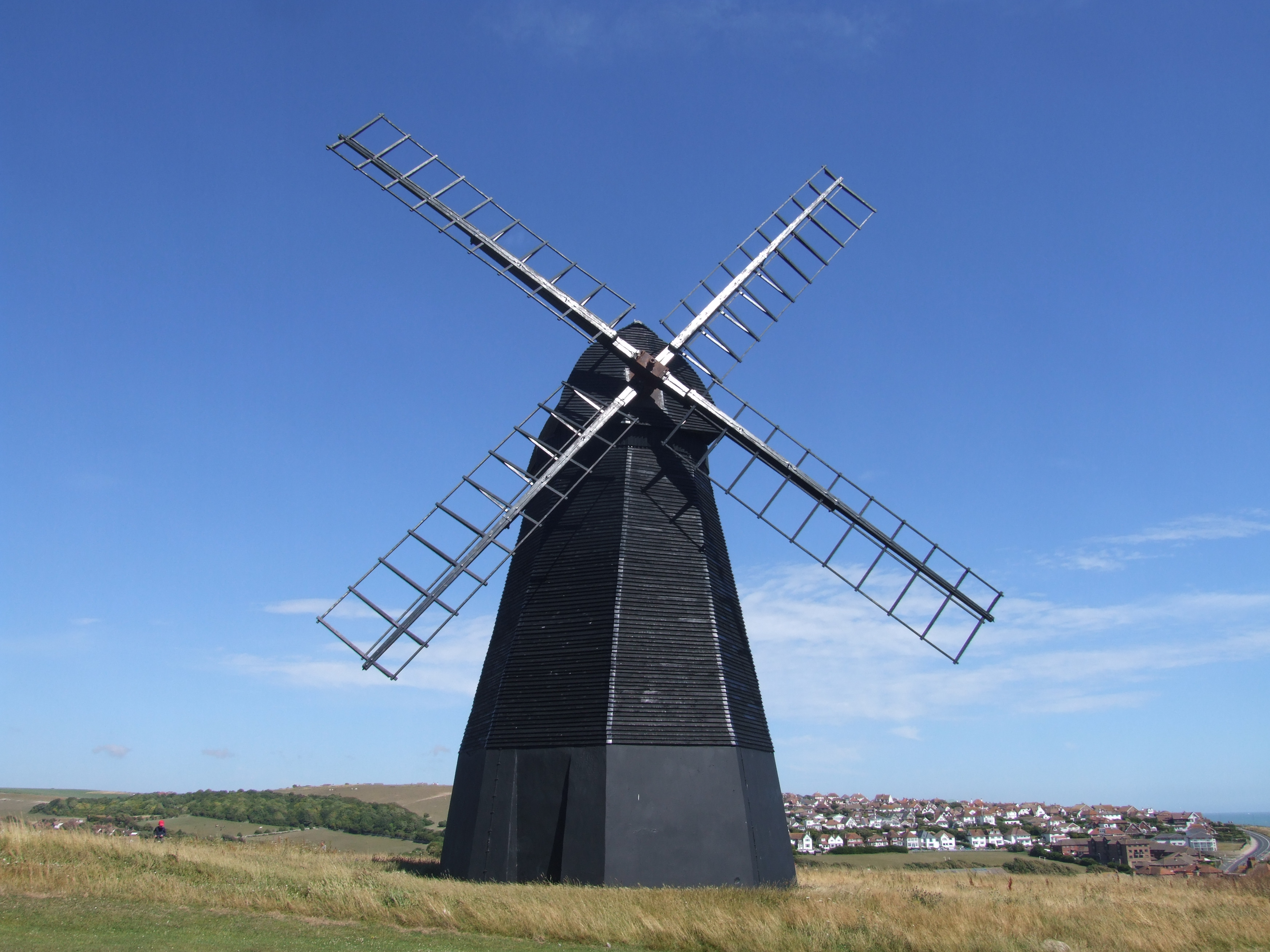
- The mill in 2010
- Interactive map of Rottingdean Windmill

Origin
- Mill name: Beacon Mill; New Mill
- Mill location: TQ 366 025
- Coordinates: 50°48′22″N 0°03′47″W
- Operator: Rottingdean Preservation Society
- Year built: 1802

Information
- Purpose: Corn mill
- Type: Smock mill
- Storeys: Three-storey smock
- Base storeys: Single-storey base
- Smock sides: Eight sides
- No. of sails: Four sails
- Type of sails: Patent sails
- Windshaft: Cast iron
- Winding: Fantail

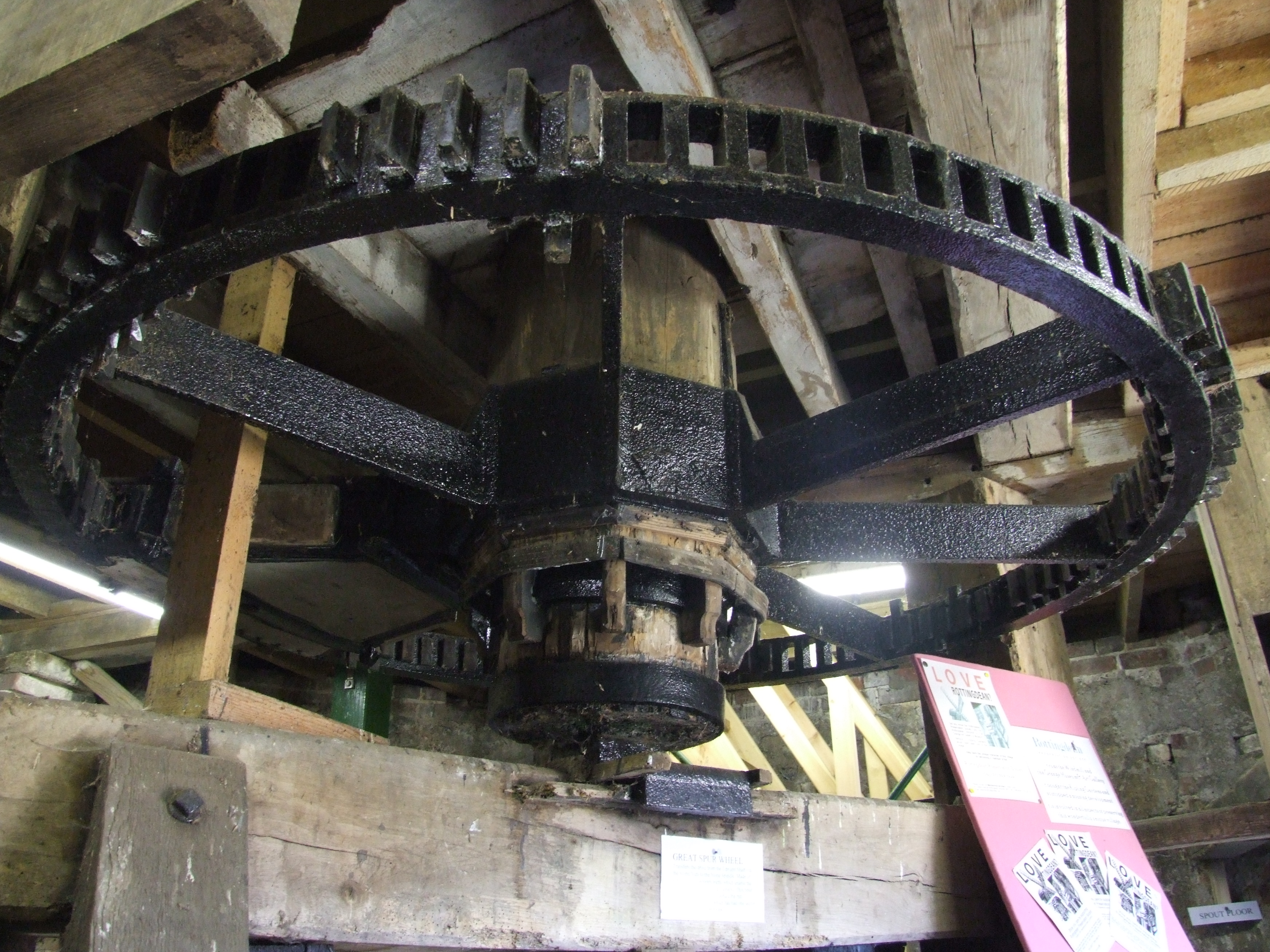
The great spur wheel on the ground floor of the Rottingdean windmill. The millstones on the floor above are driven from here.

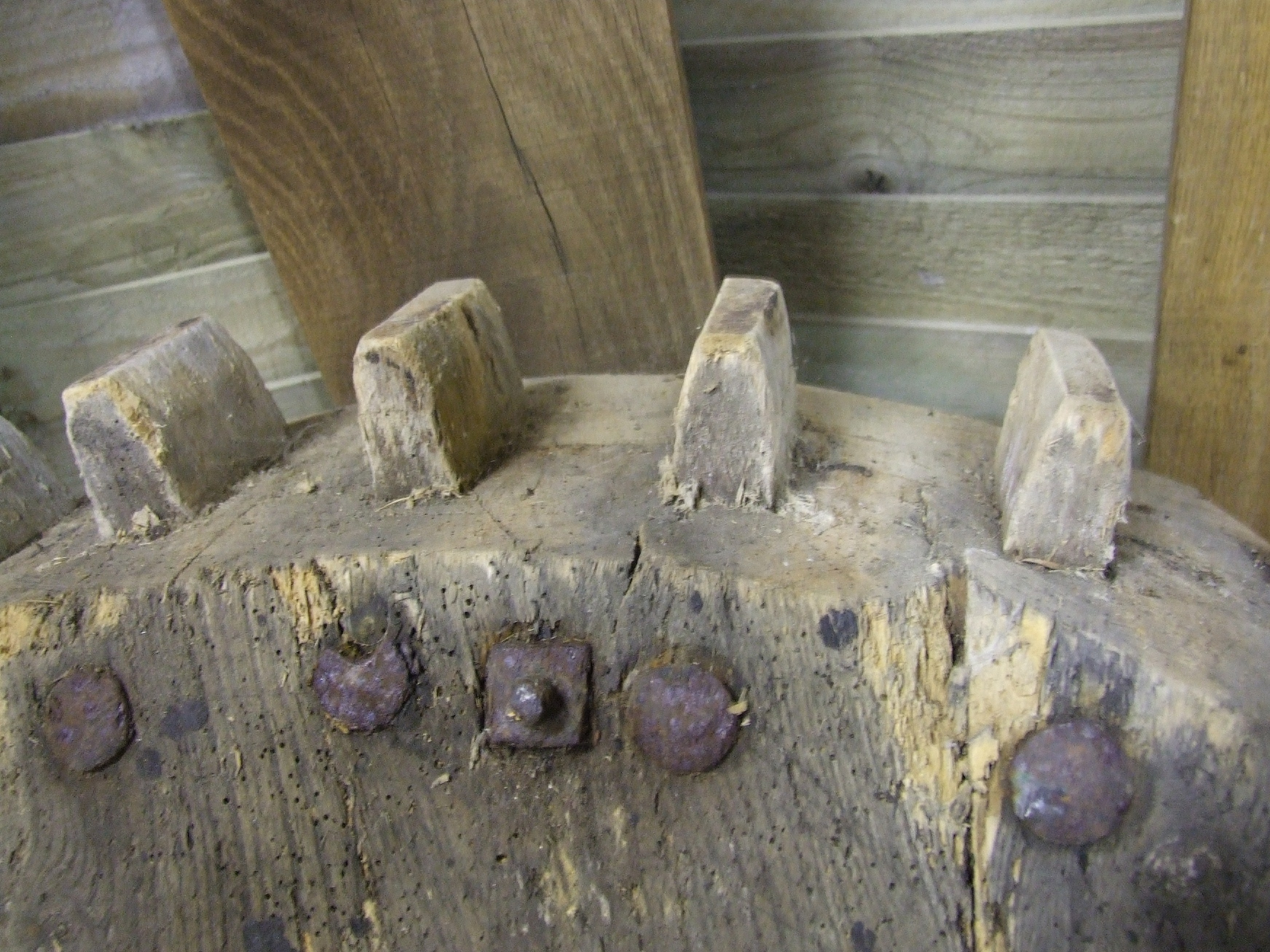
This large wooden gearwheel is mounted atop the Upright shaft and receives drive from the brake wheel which is driven by the windshaft and sails. It was cut in half during the fitting of a steel skeleton to assist in supporting the mill.

Beacon Mill or New Mill is a grade II listed smock mill at Rottingdean, Sussex, England which has been restored as a seamark. It sits within the boundary of the Beacon Hill Local Nature Reserve.

== History ==
Beacon Mill, was built in 1802. There are records of an earlier mill on the site, thought to have been a post mill. During the digging of the foundations, a human skeleton was found of an 'ancient warrior with a sword' but the remains were stolen while the labourers had lunch and have never been recovered. The mill was working until 1881 and by 1890 was in such bad condition that demolition was considered.

In 1905, the Marquis of Abergavenny had the mill repaired, but it was derelict again by the early 1920s. It was 1935 before the mill was restored again, the millwrighting being done by Neve's of Heathfield and new sails were made by Holman's, the Canterbury millwrights. In 1969, the mill was leaning to the north east, and Hole's, the Burgess Hill millwrights erected a steel frame inside the smock to support the mill, and fitted new sails. The steel framing was extended into the cap in 1974.

== Description ==
Beacon Mill is a three-storey smock mill on a single-storey brick base. It has a Kentish-style cap, and four Patent sails. It originally had a fantail, but this is now missing.

== Millers ==
- Thomas Beard: 1802 – owner
- George Nicholls: 1877 – 1881

== Culture and Media ==
The Rottingdean windmill was the inspiration for the trademark (logo) for the publishing house of Heinemann. It was designed by Sir William Nicholson, a Rottingdean resident, and on older Heinemann hardbacks you will see it engraved on the back board of the book. Although Rottingdean Mill was Nicholson's inspiration, he actually traced an older Dutch post-mill as his final design. Updated versions of the windmill are still used for Heinemann publications.

Beacon Mill featured on the front cover of the album "Vale Industrial" by Brighton band The Tenderfoot.

The mill also featured in the music video for That Old Pair of Jeans by Fatboy Slim.

The album cover of ‘Stygian Wavz’ and singles from the same album, by Canadian-American Rock Supergroup, Envy of None, also features the windmill.

== Public access ==
Beacon Mill is open to the public from 14:00 to 16:30 on both days of National Mills Weekend, and on the third Sunday of each month from May to September.

== See also ==
- Grade II listed buildings in Brighton and Hove: A–B
