= Rottingdean =

Village in Brighton, England

Coordinates: 50.815°N 0.065°W

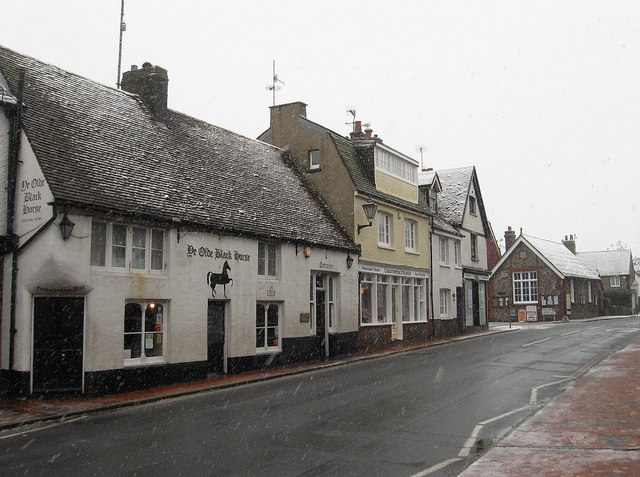
- The Olde Black Horse, High Street

- Location within East Sussex
- Population: 14,324 (2019 Rottingdean Coastal)
- OS grid reference: TQ375025
- Unitary authority: Brighton and Hove
- Ceremonial county: East Sussex
- Region: South East
- Country: England
- Sovereign state: United Kingdom
- Post town: Brighton
- Postcode district: BN2
- Dialling code: 01273
- Police: Sussex
- Fire: East Sussex
- Ambulance: South East Coast
- UK Parliament: Brighton Kemptown and Peacehaven

Rottingdean is a village in the city of Brighton and Hove, on the south coast of England. It borders the villages Saltdean, Ovingdean and Woodingdean, and has a historic centre.

== Name ==
The name Rottingdean is normally interpreted as the valley of the people associated with Rōta (a male personal name). Rota was probably the leader of a band of Saxons who invaded the region in 450–500 AD and replaced the existing Romano-British inhabitants. The first recorded mention is Rotingeden, in the Domesday Book of 1086. Other variations to be found in ancient charters include Ruttingedene (1272), Rottyngden (1315) and Rottendeane (1673).

The name was contrasted unflatteringly with Goodwood (another place in Sussex) in a national 1970s advertising campaign for wood-preserver.

== Geography ==
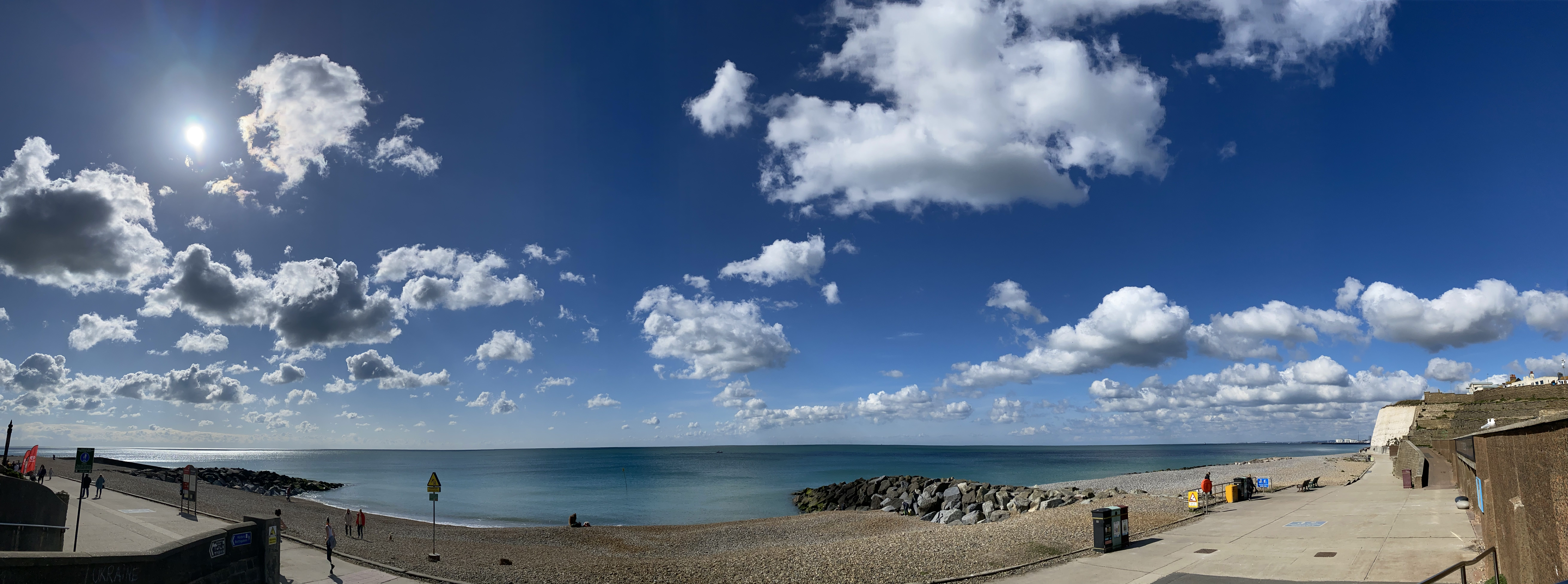
Rottingdean beach, with Brighton visible on the right (2022)

Rottingdean is in a dry valley whose sides in the upper reaches are quite steep, and this valley comes right down to the English Channel coast.

== Civil status and former extent of the area ==
The parish became part of county borough of Brighton in 1928. In 1996 it regained an independent parish council, the only one in what is now the city of Brighton and Hove. Within the parish lies the deserted hamlet of Balsdean. The adjacent village of Woodingdean was formerly (until 1933) part of Rottingdean parish. Also formerly in the parish were most of the district of what is now Saltdean; Roedean School, an independent school for girls; and the Blind Veterans UK Centre, a rehabilitation centre for blinded ex-Service personnel.

== History ==
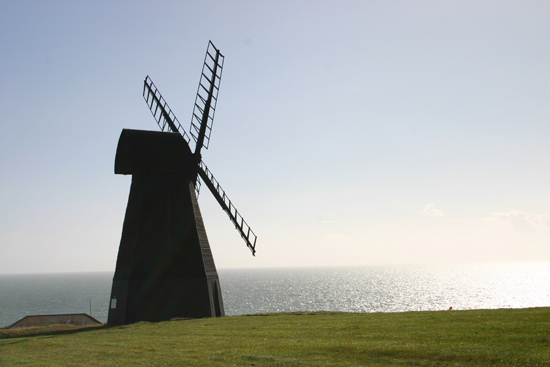
The Old Windmill, Rottingdean

The first settled inhabitants of Rottingdean were the Neolithic people, arriving around 2500 BC. They would have hacked down trees and scrub to make fields for the growing of cereals such as barley. Through the ages, from Neolithic to Bronze to Iron Age, from Roman to Anglo-Saxon the same fields were probably worked. A Bronze Age barrow and pottery fragments were found when houses were being built in the area now known as Rottingdean Heights, east of the village centre. On the other side of the village, an Iron Age burial site was uncovered in 1863 on Beacon Hill.

The Celtic Iron Age mode of life probably continued much unchanged after the arrival of the Romans in 43 AD, but, from the middle of the third century, people living near the coast were terrorised by Saxon raiders. Some panic-stricken wealthy Romano-Britons took their money from their villas and buried it in pots on remote downland sites. One such hoard was unearthed at Balsdean and contained over a thousand coins dating from the years 275–287. After the Romans withdrew from Britain, Saxons started to settle in Sussex, the name Sussex being derived from the land of the South Saxons. In the sixth century, the South Saxons settled in Rottingdean, with their leader probably giving rise to the name of the village (see above).

Five hundred years later, in 1066, the Normans invaded. The new king, William the Conqueror, rewarded his followers with land. Rottingdean was part of the Lewes district given to his brother-in-law Earl William de Warenne. From information in the Domesday Book of 1086 it can be estimated that Rottingdean had a total population of between 50 and 100 at that time.

In the summer of 1377, during the Hundred Years War, French forces attacked Rottingdean. This attack was part of a series of French raids under the command of The Admiral of France, Jean de Vienne who had a fleet of 120 ships. Earlier, his forces had sacked and burnt the port of Rye, the French even taking the church's bronze bells. The raiders landed at Rottingdean, probably intending to pillage the nearby Lewes priory. The Prior of Lewes, with a force of 500 men marched to Rottingdean. The French could see them coming and set an ambush with 300 horsemen. The outnumbered English lost at least 100 men, but inflicted sufficient casualties on the French to deter them from making an attack on Lewes itself. During the action, the Prior was captured, together with his subordinates; Sir John Falvesley (or Fallesley), Sir Thomas Cheyne and the esquire John Brocas. The Prior and the two knights were later ransomed, but John Brocas died, probably of wounds received during the battle. The village suffered grievously. The French plundered and set fire to the houses and burnt the crops. Tradition has it that in their terror the villagers fled to the church where they sought sanctuary. The attackers then set the church alight, killing everybody inside.

In the 17th century, the rise of the Quaker movement was reflected in Rottingdean, with a number of villagers becoming Quakers. Their beliefs and codes of behaviour led to confrontations with authority. Nicholas Beard was one of the wealthiest landowners in the parish, who, in line with his Quaker beliefs, refused to pay his tithes. This led to a feud between him and Robert Baker who held the position of Vicar of Rottingdean for 52 years. Nicholas Beard and other Quakers suffered imprisonment on a number of occasions and it is recorded that, in 1659, the vicar took twelve oxen, six cows and a bull from Nicholas Beard to pay a year's tithes. However, Nicholas Beard remained a wealthy man. When he died he left a plot of land in the grounds of Challoners House to be a burial ground for Quakers.

Most histories of Rottingdean mention that its inhabitants were involved in smuggling. The smuggling was in both directions; wool would be smuggled out, and tea, spirits, tobacco and lace would be smuggled in. A number of documented seizures of contraband goods were made in Rottingdean in the second half of the 18th century. Contraband was most probably unloaded at Saltdean Gap rather than at Rottingdean as it was a more deserted spot. It would then be transported over the hill, down the present Whiteways Lane into the village and then inland for distribution. It is impossible to verify all the local stories or believe all the claims about secret passages under the village, but it is persistently rumoured that the 18th century vicar Dr Thomas Hooker was involved. However, the other face of Hooker was his devotion to education. He opened schools in the village both for the well-off and for the local children.

The village was once a centre for hunting, especially in the second half of the 19th century. The Brookside Hunt was based in the village until 1902, hunting hares and foxes with a pack of hounds.

For most of its history Rottingdean was a farming community, but from the late 18th century it attracted leisured visitors wanting a genteel alternative to raffish Brighton, among them people famous in English cultural life. Some, in the late 19th century, notably the painter Sir Edward Burne-Jones and his nephew Rudyard Kipling, made it their home. When farming collapsed in the 1920s, much of the farmland became available for building, and Rottingdean increased significantly in population, but especially in the area known as Saltdean. The Woodingdean area was made a separate parish in 1933 to cope with its expanding population.

== Buildings ==
=== The Black Horse ===
Now a public house on the High Street, the Black Horse is believed to be the oldest entire building in Rottingdean, having been built during the reign of Henry VIII, perhaps as early as 1513. It was formerly called the "Black Hole". Its lounge was once a forge.

=== Challoners ===
The old manor house of Rottingdean dates back to 1450 but only the cellars remain of the original building. Thomas Challoner built the manor but it later passed into the hands of the Beard family. Extensions were built right up to the 19th century and one distinctive feature is the solarium window. The present building, with its hidden smugglers’ tunnels, dates back to the late 16th century.

=== The Elms ===
The Elms is most famous for being lived in by Rudyard Kipling, who rented the property between 1897 and 1902. The Elms was built around 1750, situated on The Green facing the village pond. From 1785 to 1859 it was owned by the Ingram family. Roderick Jones and his wife Enid Bagnold bought the house in 1929 to prevent it from being turned into a hotel. It was leased to Ernest Beard after the Second World War and was then lived in by Enid Bagnold's daughter Laurian d'Harcourt until it was sold in 1975. The Rottingdean Preservation Society (now called Rottingdean Heritage) bought most of the grounds of The Elms to protect them from development, so creating the Kipling Gardens in 1986.

=== The Grange ===
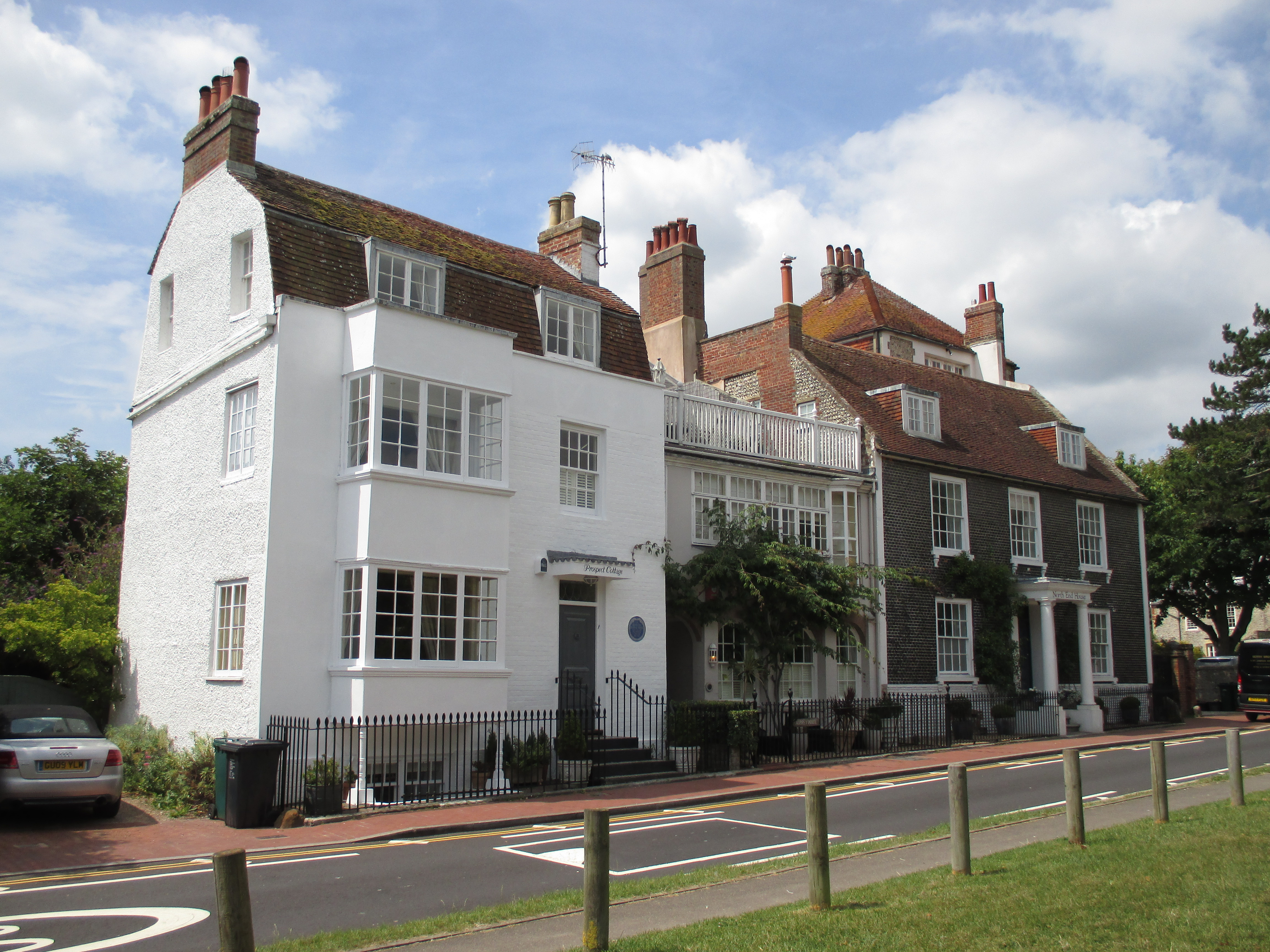
North End House

Originally built as a vicarage and extended by the vicar Thomas Hooker in the early 19th century as a school, the house was purchased by the artist Sir William Nicholson who renamed it The Grange when he lived there before WW1. In the 1920s, Lutyens restored the property for London solicitor Sir George Lewis, with Gertrude Jeckyll influencing the garden design. Developer Charles Neville occupied it for some time. It now houses an Art Gallery and Museum which are managed by Rottingdean Heritage volunteers, as well as the local library and Tourist Information Hub which are the responsibility of Brighton and Hove Council.

=== North End House: Prospect Cottage, Aubrey Cottage and Gothic House ===
Prospect Cottage, situated on The Green, was purchased by the Pre-Raphaelite artist Sir Edward Burne-Jones in 1880. He then acquired Aubrey Cottage next door and combined the two properties giving them the name North End House. Aubrey Cottage has a narrow vertical window to enable artists' canvases to be moved. The writer Enid Bagnold bought the property with her husband Sir Roderick Jones in 1923 and extended into the adjoining Gothic House. These three properties were the inspiration for Angela Thirkell's autobiographical Three Houses (1931). She was the granddaughter of Edward Burne Jones. The three houses are now separate dwellings once again.

=== St Margaret's Church ===
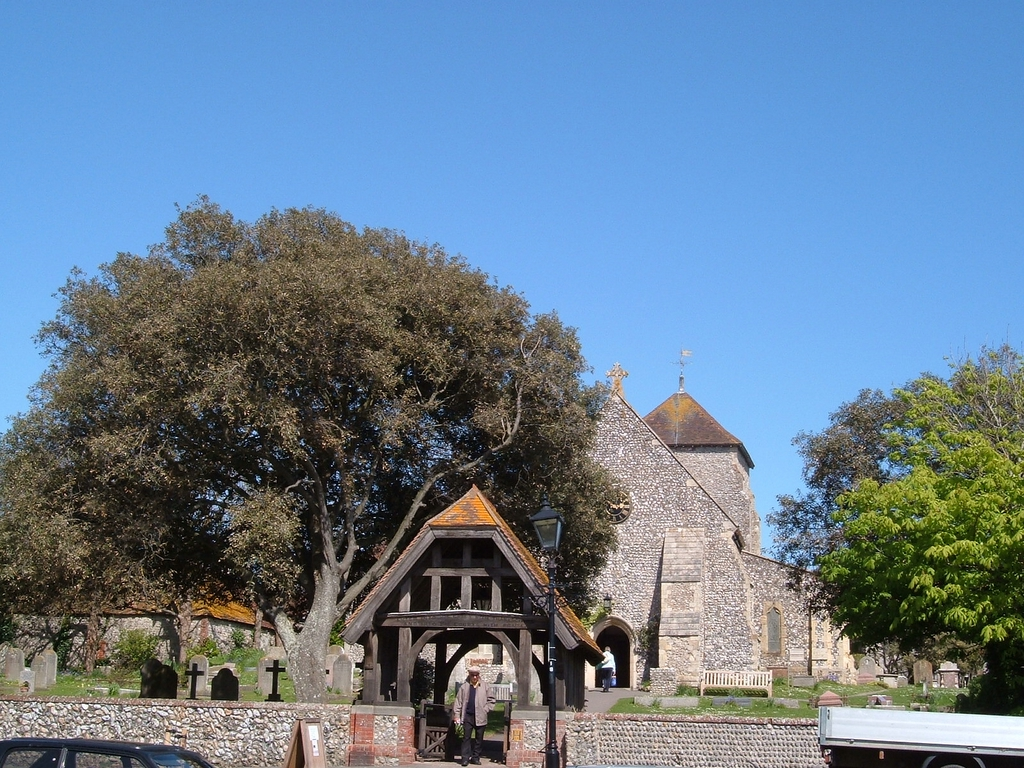
St Margaret's parish church

The present church stands on the site of an Anglo-Saxon building, reconstructed at frequent intervals especially during the period c.1000–1400. Substantial rebuilding occurred in 1856 to the designs of Sir George Gilbert Scott. St Margaret's church Rottingdean features stained glass windows built by William Morris from the designs of the artist Sir Edward Burne-Jones. An almost exact replica of the church was constructed at the Forest Lawn Memorial Park, Glendale, California in 1941.

=== Tallboys ===
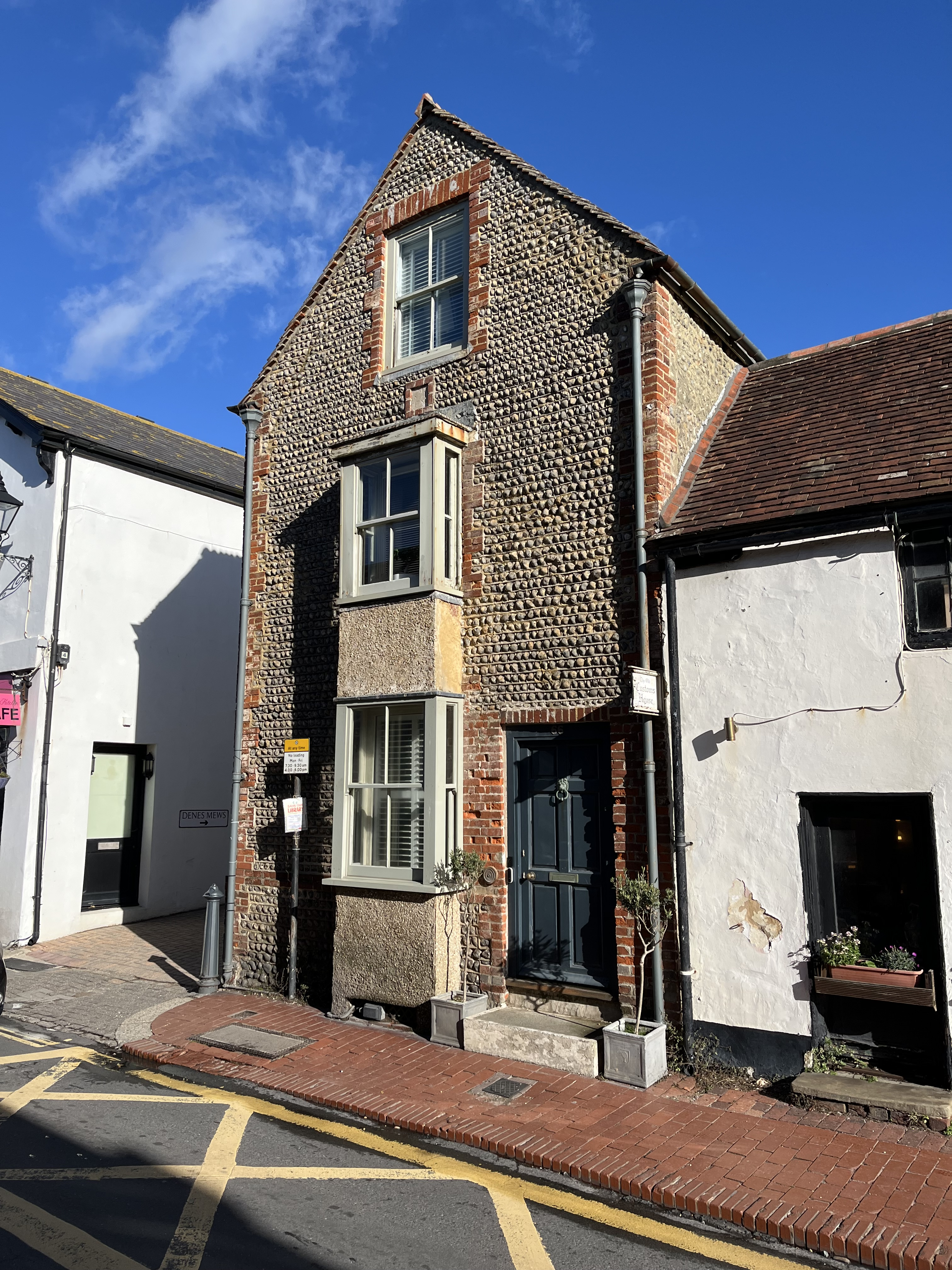
Tallboys, the old Customs House

A high, narrow building on the High Street. It was built in 1780 and served as the customs house.

=== Tudor Close ===
Converted from two former barns and a cowshed of Court Farm in the 1920s. The seven original houses did not sell well and were converted into the fashionable Tudor Close Hotel, which in the 1930s played host to many celebrities of the day. In the 1950s it was converted yet again into residential property. The only claim to authenticity for these mock-Tudor structures is the possible age of some of the beams.

=== Windmill ===
Rottingdean is known for the black wooden windmill erected on Beacon Hill to the west of the village in 1802. The painter William Nicholson made a woodcut that was used as the logo of the publisher William Heinemann; this is often said to have been inspired by Rottingdean mill, although the mill on the logo is very different in appearance. The mill ceased to function in 1881 and has required regular restoration ever since, a task now undertaken by the Rottingdean Preservation Society. The mill is a Grade II listed landmark.

=== Whipping Post House ===
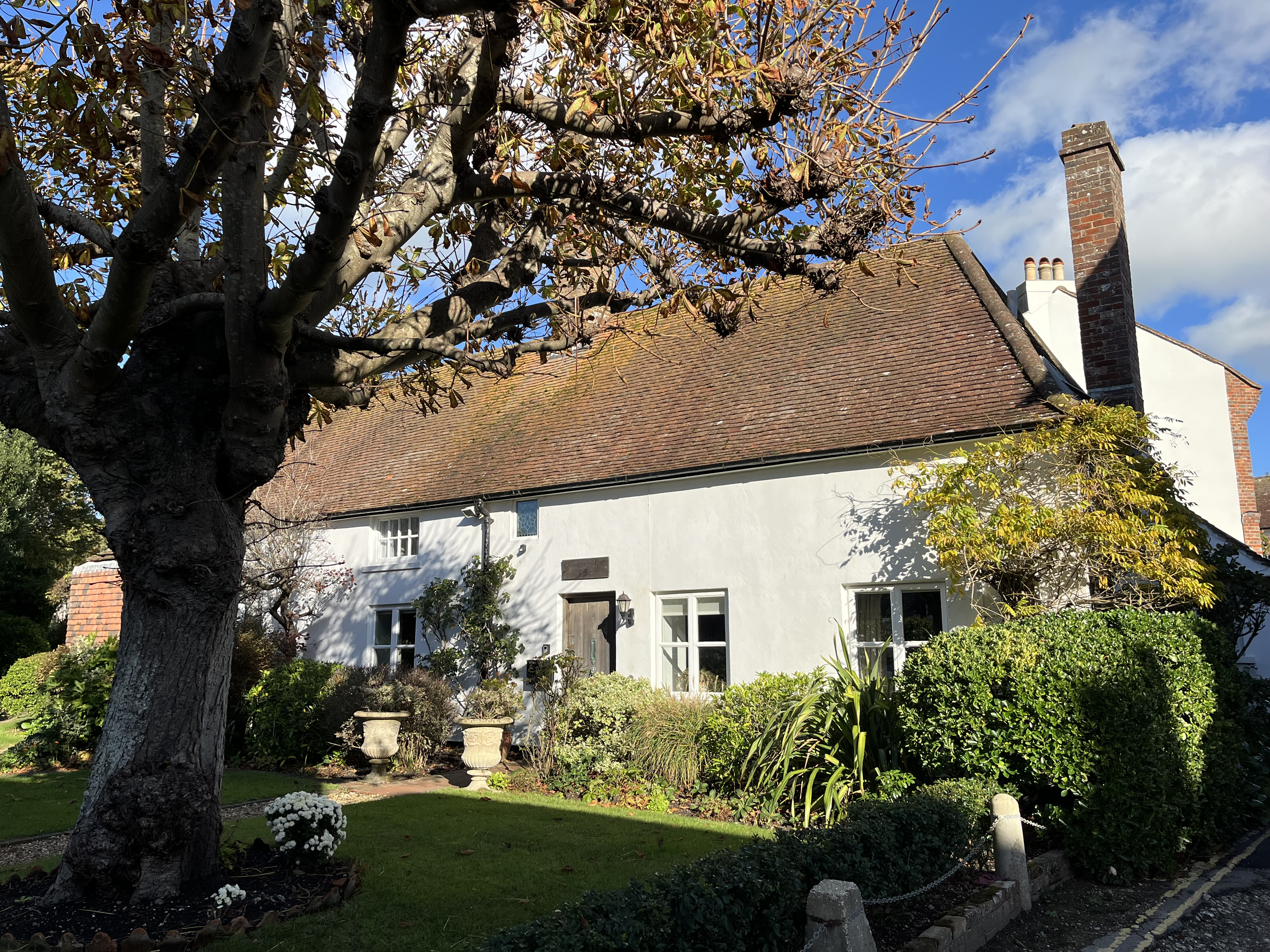
Whipping Post House

Originally a sixteenth-century cottage, its grounds were the site of the village stocks and whipping post. It was once the home of Captain Dunk, village butcher by day and smuggler by night. Part of the building continued to serve as a butcher's shop in later years under William Hilder.

== Schools past and present ==
=== Rottingdean School ===
The vicar Dr Thomas Hooker founded a private school in the vicarage in the early 19th Century. He expanded his classes to an annexe in the High Street. From 1863 a Mr Hewitt ran Field House School on the High Street site; there Ralph Vaughan Williams and the later Earl Jellicoe were educated. The school took the name Rottingdean School in 1887 and seven years later moved to new buildings in the north of the village by the Falmer Road on land that had belonged to Steyning Beard. The vacant building on the High Street became (under a different proprietor) St Aubyns Preparatory School.

J.E Maxwell-Hyslop MA, Balliol College, Oxford, and England Rugby International was the Headmaster of Rottingdean School pre- and postwar. He scored his first try against Ireland in his debut match in 1922. Alumni include the linguist Maurice Pope, the author and broadcaster Robert Kee and Sir Ian Jacob, Director-General of the BBC. The school buildings were demolished in 1964, with much of the site developed as residential properties called The Rotyngs. Today, only the war memorial and playing fields remain.

=== Village School ===
Dr Thomas Hooker also started a school for the village children some time before 1818. In the 1840s a Lewes banker, George Molineux, let a house near the coast at Rottingdean for use as a National School. The school was funded from voluntary subscriptions and the payment of a fee of 1d. per week for each pupil. In 1859, Lord Abergavenny and James Ingram donated a piece of land for the construction of a purpose-built schoolroom at the bottom of Neville Road, opening in 1860. In 1874 a separate infants school was built on the opposite side of the road. By 1953, the school had become Rottingdean Church of England Primary School and new school buildings were opened in Whiteway Lane. However, the new building could only accommodate 160 of the 221 children enrolled, so the Neville Road building continued in use until extra classrooms were constructed on the new site in 1957 and 1961. In 1986 a serious fire caused major disruption, with the rebuilding taking until 1988.

=== Our Lady of Lourdes School ===
The Roman Catholic school opened in 1969, initially for children aged 5 to 7. The school was extended to cater for children up to age 11 in 1989.

=== Longhill School ===
Longhill School opened in 1963 as a Secondary Modern school. Although geographically within Rottingdean's boundaries it initially drew most of its intake from Woodingdean. It became a Comprehensive school in 1975. By 1992 it was attracting so many pupils – from as far afield as Newhaven and Brighton – that it was substantially extended.

=== St Aubyns ===
St Aubyns was a boys' preparatory school, founded in 1895. Amongst the pupils were Wilfred Ewart, tutored privately after St Aubyns rather than going to Eton. During the First World War he served as a subaltern in the Scots Guards and wrote one of the most iconic novels of the war 'Way of Revelation'. Rudyard Kipling’s son, John, also attended St Aubyns. The school was privately owned, usually by the head master, until 1969, after which it was owned and operated by an independent charitable trust. St Aubyns closed in 2013.

=== Roedean School ===
Roedean School is an independent day and boarding school for girls. In 1879 it moved to its present site on the cliff-top west of Rottingdean. At the time, the land was part of Rottingdean parish and was purchased from the Marquess of Abergavenny.

== Notable residents ==
- Lucy Baldwin, Countess Baldwin of Bewdley (née Ridsdale; 1869–1945), writer and activist for maternal health, grew up in Rottingdean.
- Edward Burne-Jones, Pre-Raphaelite artist
- Katharine Goodson, English pianist
- Rudyard Kipling, writer
- William Nicholson, artist
- Jake Shillingford, artist and frontman of My Life Story
- Enid Bagnold, writer
- William Watson, poet
- Angela Thirkell, writer
- Fred Perry, tennis player
- Michael Fabricant, former Member of Parliament for Lichfield
- John Volanthen, cave diver

Most of these well-known people were not local, and had settled in or retired to Rottingdean. The village also had home-grown talent of significance, notably the Copper Family who maintained a long tradition of English folk song, performing for the collector Kate Lee as early as 1892. Its best-known member was Bob Copper (1915–2004), also known as a writer. The Rottingdean Preservation Society recognised their importance in the village and erected a plaque in 2010 at 1 Challoner's Cottages, partly funded from its own resources but complemented by a donation from the English Folk Dance and Song Society.

Katherine Mansfield spent a few months in Rottingdean in 1910, staying above a grocery shop in the High Street.

World War I veteran Henry Allingham was a resident of St Dunstan's. Allingham was the oldest man in the world and the last founder member of the RAF when he died aged 113 in July 2009.

== Sport ==
Rottingdean Cricket Club was founded in 1758. The original cricket pitch was at Balsdean, moving to Beacon Hill in the early 19th century but is now situated on the Falmer Road. The 1st team play in the Sussex County League, Division 3 East.

== Popular culture ==
The board game Cluedo, launched in 1949, had its origins in Rottingdean. Travelling entertainers Anthony and Elva Pratt hosted murder mystery games at the Tudor Close Hotel in Rottingdean, played out by guests and local actors. Called Murder at Tudor Close, they took the idea to Waddingtons, who marketed it as Cluedo.

Victorian Rottingdean is the setting for the mystery novel Death at Rottingdean. Rottingdean plays an important role in the final act of C. J. Sansom's alternate history novel Dominion. A shop in Rottingdean was the inspiration for the Local Shop in the comedy series The League of Gentlemen.

== See also ==
- Brighton and Rottingdean Seashore Electric Railway

== General references ==
- Carder, Tim (1991) The encyclopaedia of Brighton. Lewes: East Sussex County Council (1991).
- Coates, Richard (2010) A history of Rottingdean and Ovingdean through their place-names. Nottingham: English Place-Name Society.
- Copper, Bob (1976) Early to rise. London: Heinemann (1976).
- Heater, Derek (1993) The remarkable history of Rottingdean. Brighton: Dyke Publications.
- Rottingdean Preservation Society annual reports and unpublished archives.
- Green, Howard (1973) Guide to the Battlefields of Britain & Ireland London: Constable and Company, Ltd
