= Woodingdean =

Suburb of Brighton, England

Coordinates: 50.836°N 0.07°W

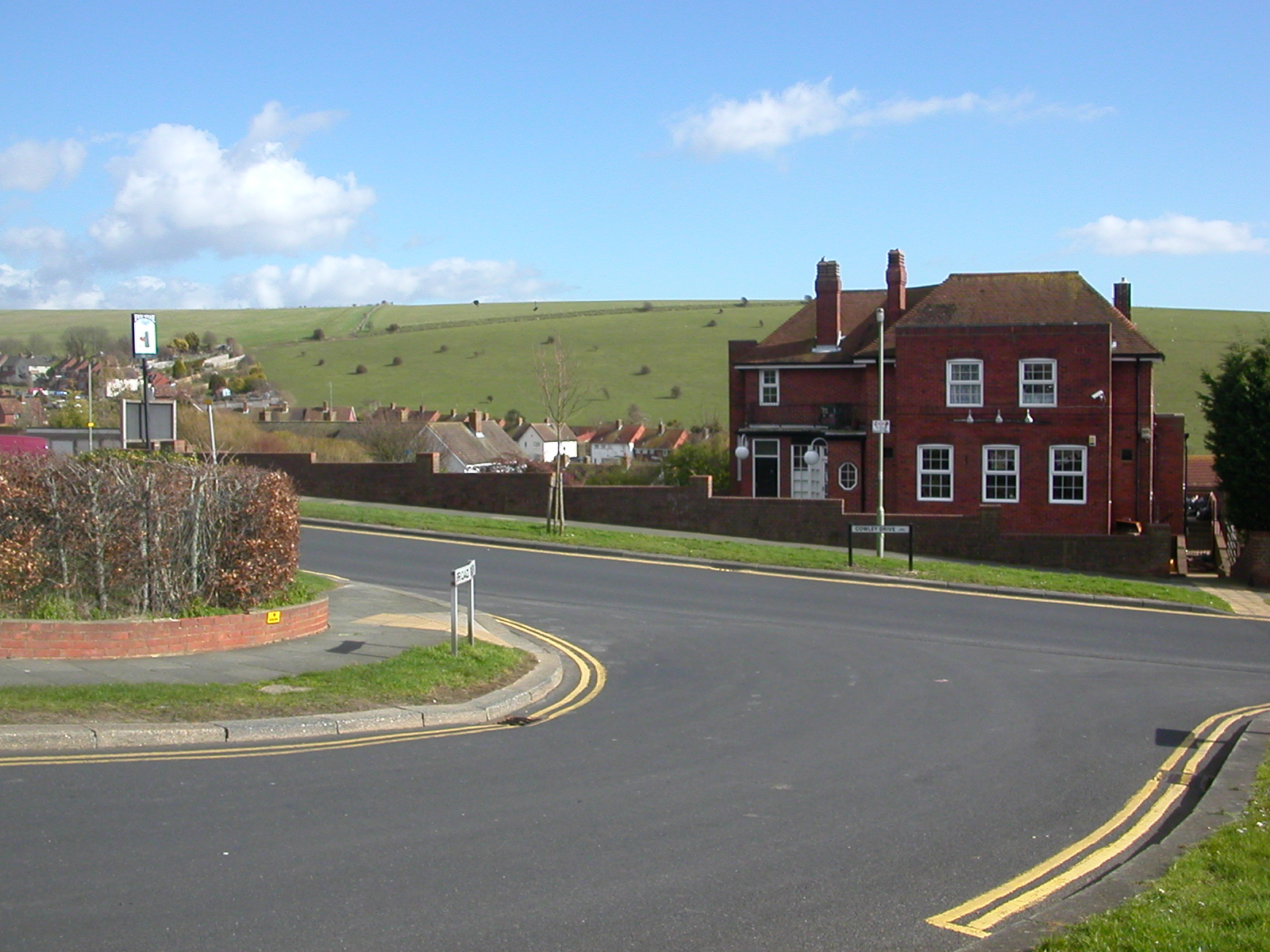
- Cowley Drive, at the south end of Woodingdean

- Location within East Sussex
- Population: 9,535 (2024.Ward)
- Unitary authority: Brighton and Hove
- Ceremonial county: East Sussex
- Region: South East
- Country: England
- Sovereign state: United Kingdom
- Post town: BRIGHTON
- Postcode district: BN2
- Dialling code: 01273
- Police: Sussex
- Fire: East Sussex
- Ambulance: South East Coast
- UK Parliament: Brighton, Kemptown

Woodingdean is an eastern suburb of the city of Brighton and Hove, East Sussex, separated from the main part of the city by downland and the Brighton Racecourse. The name Woodingdean came from Woodendean (i.e. wooded valley) Farm which was situated in the south end of what is now Ovingdean.

== History ==
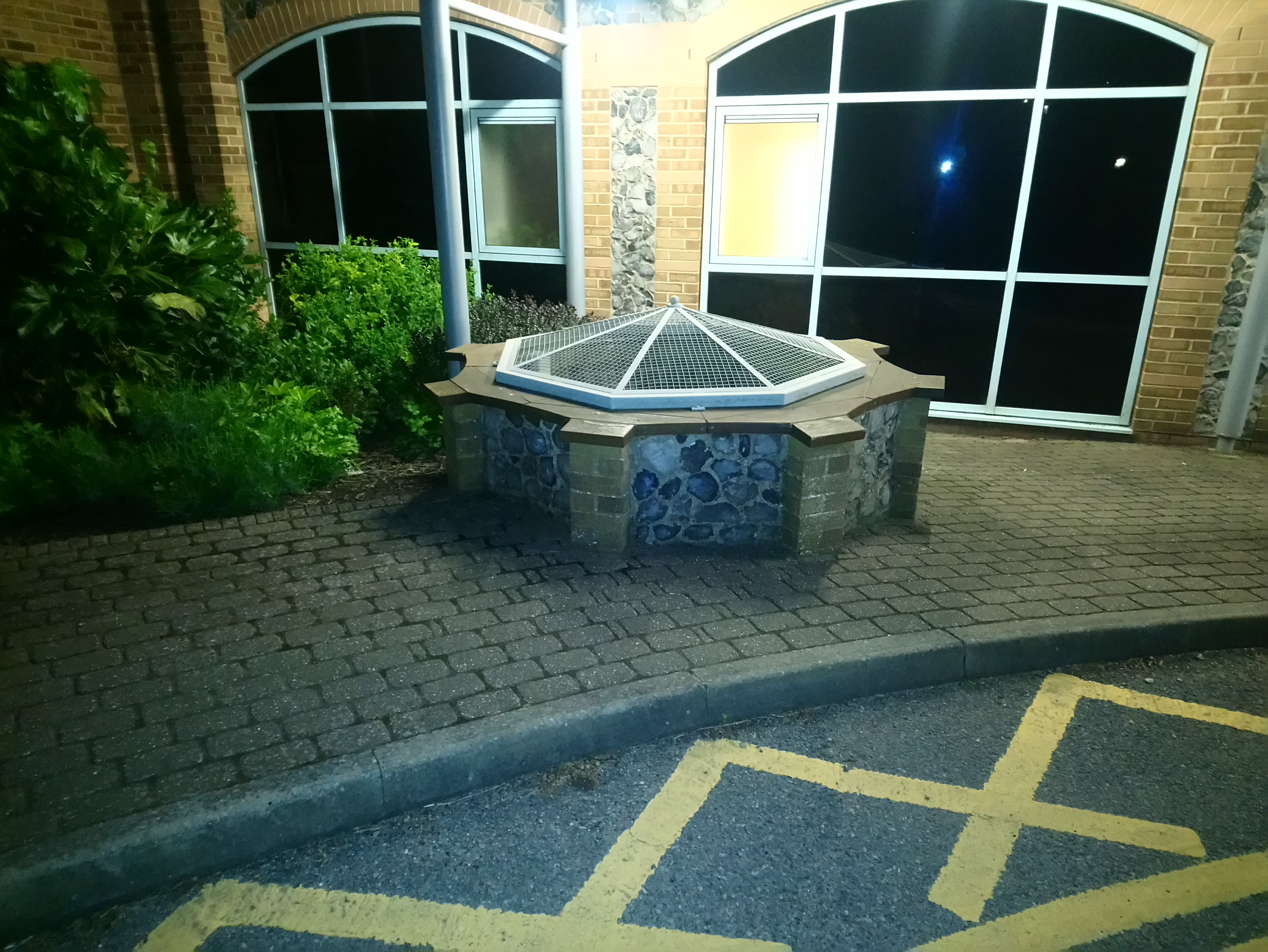
Woodingdean Water Well

The earliest buildings in Woodingdean, apart from scattered farm buildings, were those of the former workhouse school in Warren Road, now the site of the Nuffield Hospital. The grounds contain the capped site of what is claimed to be the deepest hand-dug well in the world, the Woodingdean Water Well, which was created to provide water for the workhouse. It was excavated between 1858 and 1862, and has a depth of 1,285 feet (392 m).

Woodingdean in its present form began to grow up after the First World War in the northern part of the parish of Rottingdean. It consisted of plots of land on the South Downs which had formerly been used for sheep-farming. These were sold by developers (often but not exclusively to returning soldiers) and most were originally smallholdings, e.g. poultry farms.

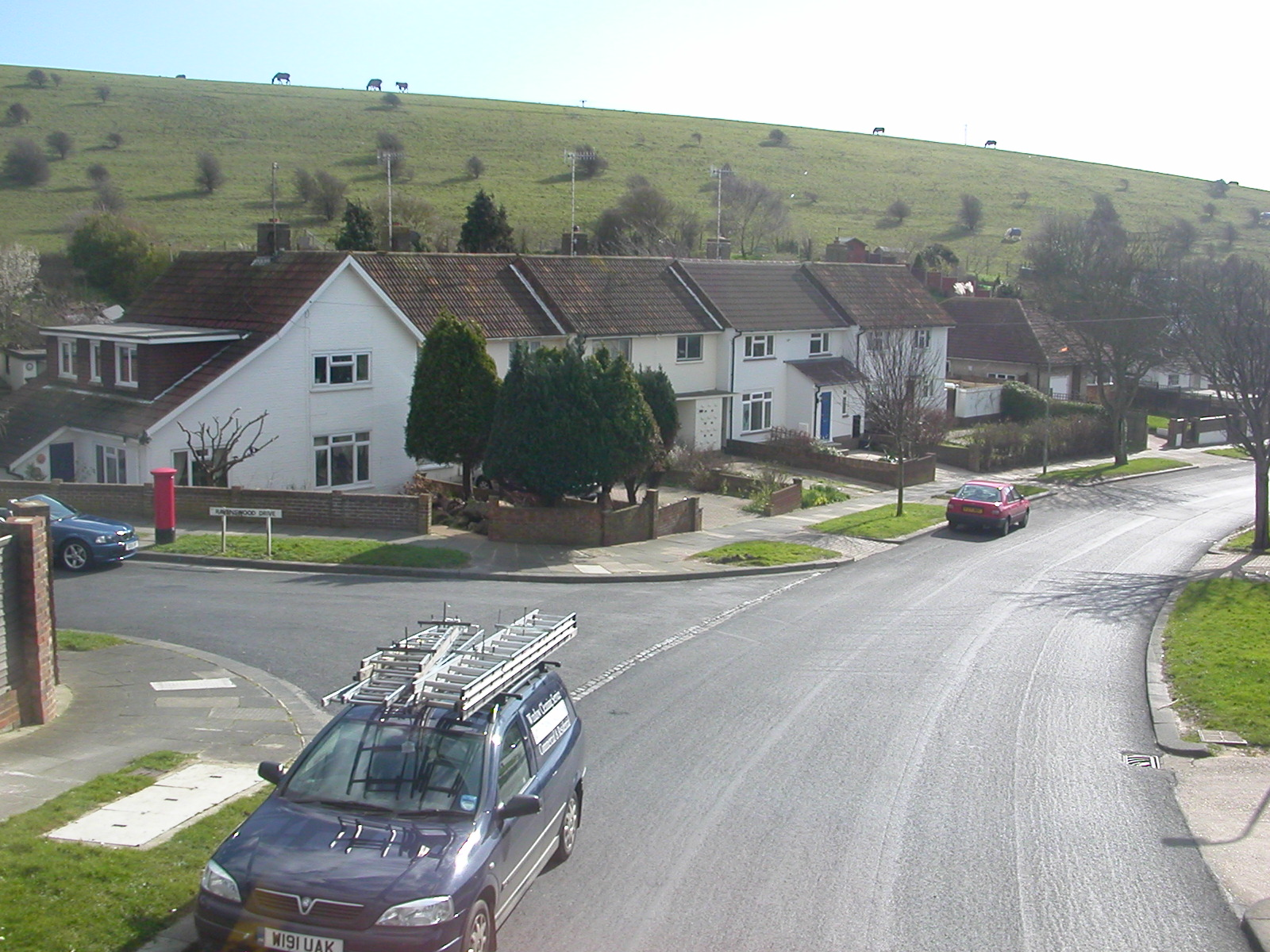
The junction of Ravenswood Drive and Cowley Drive, showing the proximity of the open countryside of the South Downs.

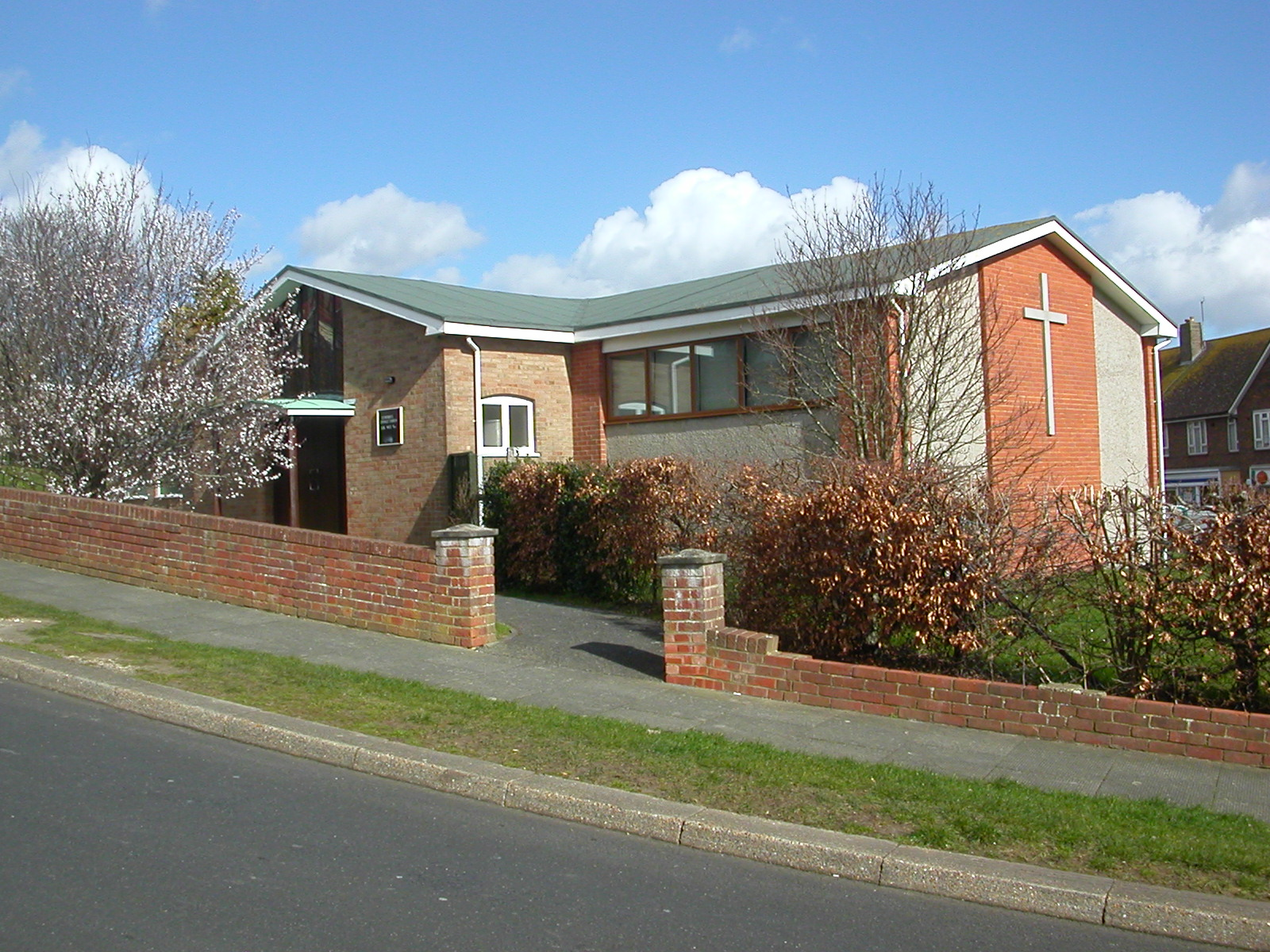
St Patrick's Roman Catholic Church, Woodingdean

The development of the present residential area very much mirrors that of neighbouring Ovingdean. From the 1920s building plots were sold off and first generation shacks and houses began to appear. The area was once locally notorious, like nearby Peacehaven, for the shacks that were put up on these plots, whose architectural styles ranged from Wooden Hut to Railway Carriage Body. Life in these plotlands was satirized in a stage play by H. F. Maltby called What Might Happen (1927). In 1928, both Woodingdean and Ovingdean became part of Brighton County Borough, a move which heralded a substantial increase in residential development.

The area was extensively developed during the 1950s and 1960s when most of the roads in the north-eastern and southern ends of the village were built, including North Woodingdean and South Woodingdean Council estates, which give Woodingdean its distinctive layout - a kidney shaped suburb with private estates in the middle, and a layer of council housing round the edge backing on to the open Downs. There was also a small industrial estate at the north-western end, just off Falmer Road next to the North Woodingdean Estate. The main buildings were the Jaycee Furniture factory and Sunblest Bakery, closed in the 1990s and demolished in 2002.

== Notable areas ==
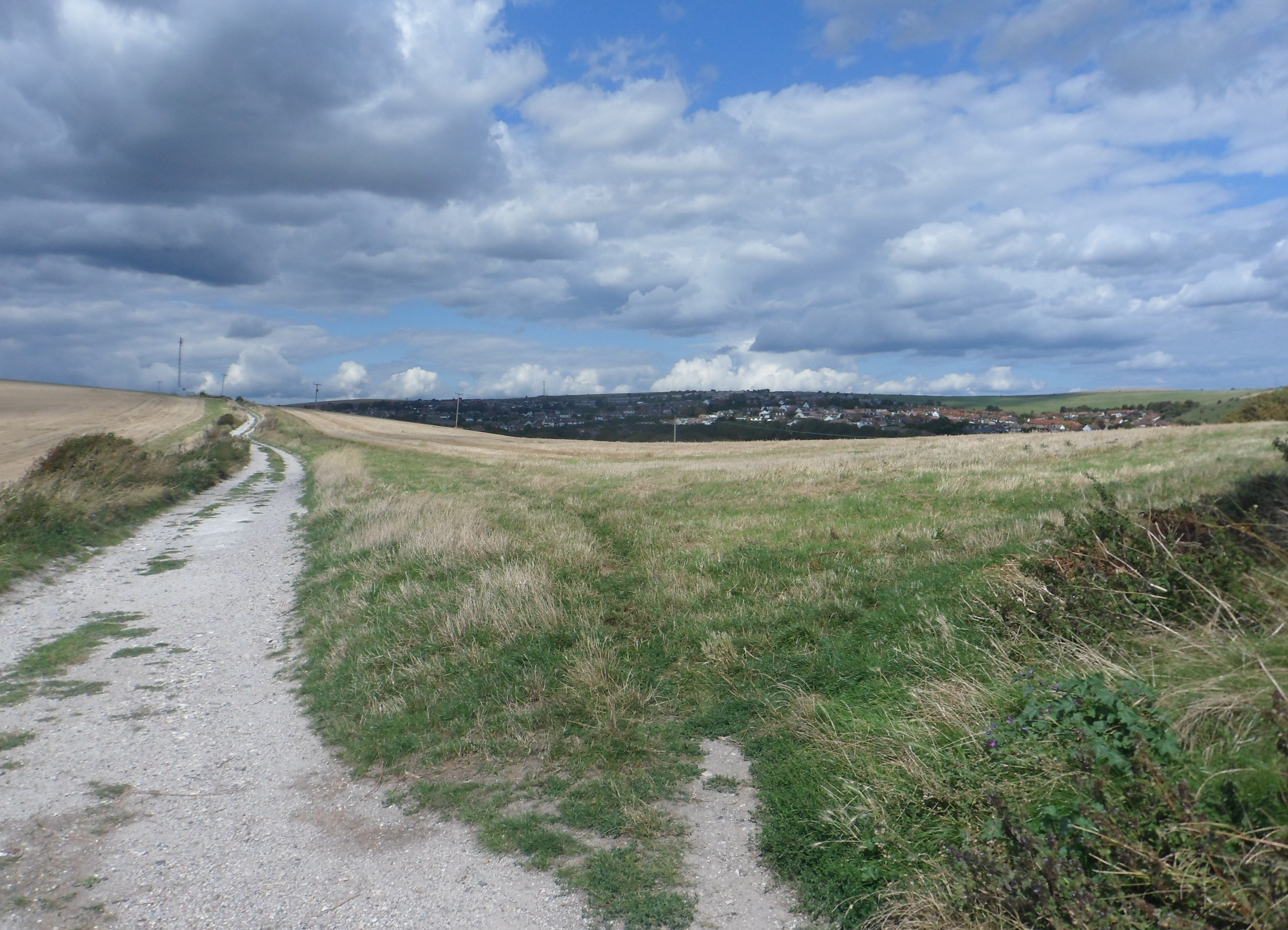
Woodingdean and Happy Valley seen from Ovingdean Road

The most notable thing about Woodingdean is its magnificent views to the south over the Downs to the English Channel and the number of pleasant walks there are to do in the area. To the west it is a short walk to Brighton, to the northwest there are downland paths to Bevendean and to north there are walks from Upper Bevendean Farm to Falmer Hill. To the east of the Falmer Road there are walks to Newmarket Hill and into the historic Falmer parish as well as east towards Kingston near Lewes through Newmarket Bottom and the remarkable Castle Hill Local nature reserve.

=== Downland to the South ===
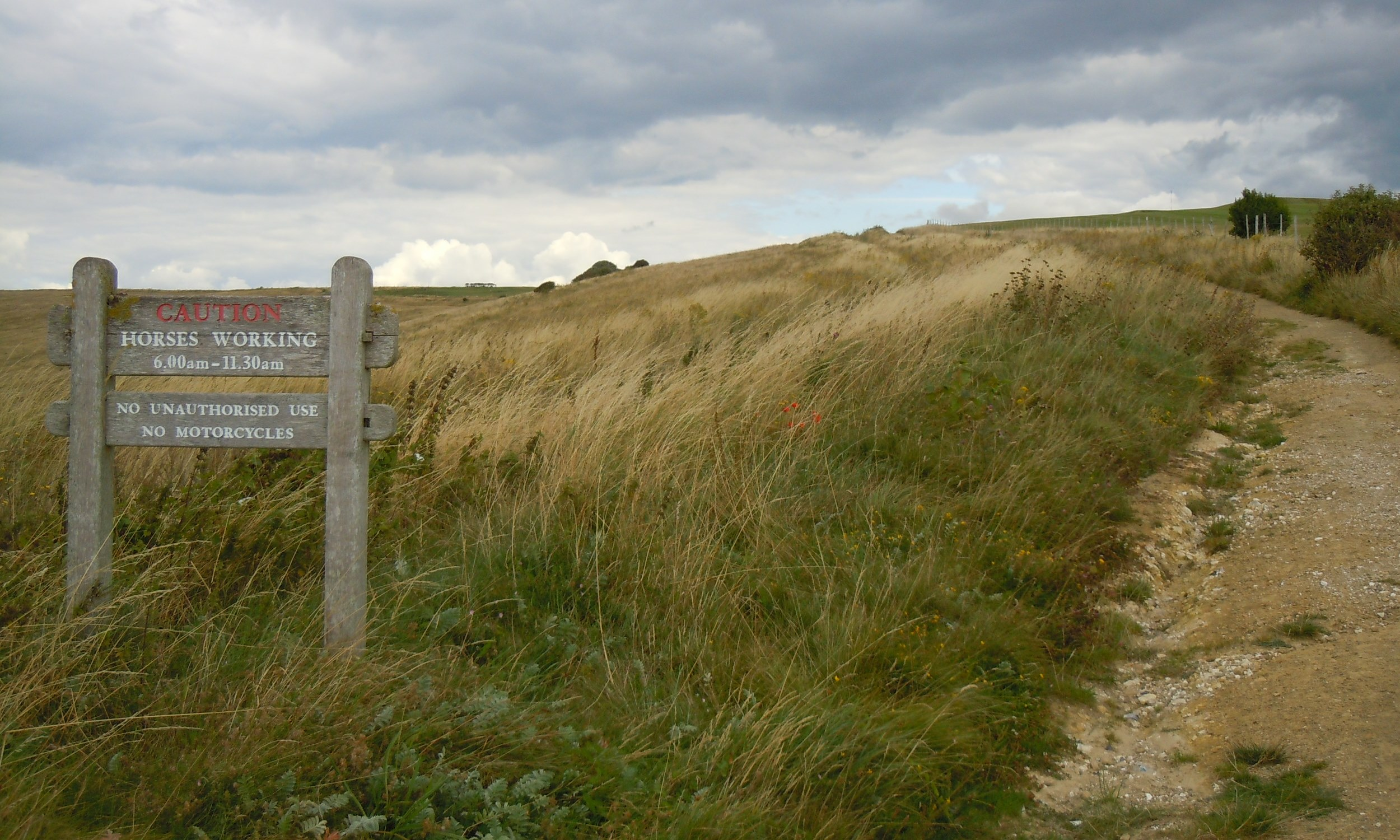
Footpath above East Brighton Golf Course leading to Warren Avenue, Woodingdean

To the south of Warren Road, past Nuffield Hospital is Wick Bottom (TQ 35 04). The valley is a peaceful valley which takes its name from the medieval farm on the Falmer Road, now long-gone. The name ‘wick’ may denote a far more ancient, perhaps Roman, farmstead. In modern times it has been a place of arable stubbles, but there be a good array of chalk loving plants such as henbit deadnettle, field madder, round-leaved fluellen and common fumitory.

East Brighton Golf Course (TQ 346 042) lies to the valley's west and is unlike many Downland courses in that it has left the scrub thickets and woodland. In winter short-eared owls often reside in the area.

To the east of the valley rises to Mount Pleasant. There is a small triangle of rich chalk grassland. It’s rough and derelict, but special wildlife clings on and there are big swarms of Pride of Sussex rampion, dropwort, horseshoe vetch and hairy violet. European stonechat frequent its thorn and bramble.

To the west of the Falmer Road is Happy Valley, (TQ 357 047), a bushy, cattle-grazed slope with old Down pasture herbs, bits of gorse and thorn. The area includes a recreation park

=== Downland to the East ===
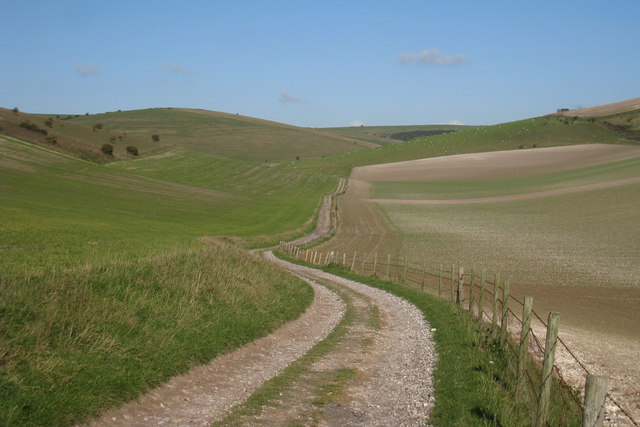
Track at The Bostle

To the east of Woodingdean is the Bostle barrow field (TQ 371 054), a ‘precious fragment’ of antiquity surrounded by agricultural fields. The field has a cluster of at least twenty-seven small low grassy mounds, which are probably Saxon, and three larger, probably Bronze Age barrows on the top of the hill just south of the bridleway fence line. The Bostle valley slope (TQ 371 048) is an ancient Down pasture slope with the softest sheep’s fescue turf, just south of the barrow field. To the northeast is Bullock Hill with bostal tracks through Standean Bottom to old Balsdean.
