= Yuri Kondratiev =

Ukrainian mathematician (1953–2023)

- Юрій Кондратьєв
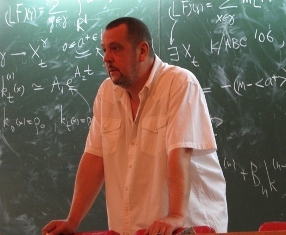
- Kondratiev in 2007
- Born: 23 October 1953; Kiev, Ukrainian SSR, Soviet Union
- Died: 5 September 2023 (aged 69)
- Education: Kyiv University
- Awards: Alexander von Humboldt Foundation Fellowship (1991-1993); State Prize of Ukraine in Science and Technology (1998)
- Scientific career
- Fields: Mathematics
- Workplaces: Bielefeld University, Germany
- Doctoral advisor: Y. Berezansky

Yuri Hryhorovych Kondratiev (Ukrainian: Юрій Григорович Кондратьєв; 23 October 1953 – 5 September 2023) was a Ukrainian mathematician and a professor at the Bielefeld University in Germany.

Kondratiev died on 5 September 2023, at the age of 69.

- His research interests included functional analysis, mathematical physics and stochastic calculus.
- Kondratiev was a member of the Kyiv school of functional analysis founded by M. Krein and led, for many years, by Y. Berezansky.
- His interests in mathematical physics were inspired by cooperation with the Moscow seminar in statistical Physics (R. Dobrushin, R. Minlos, Y. Sinai). Yuri's collaboration with A. Skorokhod has influenced most of his subsequent papers on stochastics.

== Biography ==
- In 1975, Yuri Kondratiev graduated with honours from Kyiv University.
- In 1979, Kondratiev completed his Candidate of Sciences with thesis entitled “Generalized functions in problems of infinite dimensional analysis” at the Kyiv University.
- In 1987, Kondratiev obtained the Degree of Doctor of Sciences in the area "Spectral Analysis of Infinite Dimensional Elliptic Differential Operators”.
- From 1991 Kondratiev worked in Ukraine (Institute of Mathematics of the National Academy of Sciences of Ukraine, National Pedagogical Dragomanov University) as well as in Germany (University of Bonn, Bielefeld University) and the UK (University of Reading). From 2008 he held a full Professor position at the Bielefeld University.

== Work ==
- Kondratiev wrote a book entitled "Spectral Methods in Infinite Dimensional Analysis" (1988, with Y. Berezansky, in Russian; translated into English in 1995).
- Kondratiev co-authored a monograph "The Statistical Mechanics of Quantum Lattice Systems" (with S. Albeverio, Y. Kozitsky and M. Röckner).
- Together with S. Albeverio and M. Röckner Yuri initiated a systematical study of Continuous Configuration Spaces. One space of stochastic distributions is named after him («Kondratiev space»).

== Selected articles ==
- Analysis and geometry on configuration spaces (with S. Albeverio and M. Rökner), J. Funct. Anal., 154, 444–500 (1998).
- Analysis and geometry on configuration spaces: The Gibbsian case, J. Funct. Anal., 157, 242–291 (1998).
- Harmonic analysis on configuration spaces I. General theory (with T. Kuna), IDAQP, 5, 201–233 (2002).
- On contact processes in continuum (with A. Skorokhod), IDAQP, 9, 187–198 (2006).
- Semigroup approach to non-equilibrium birth-and-death stochastic dynamics in continuum (with D. Finkelshtein and O. Kutovyi), J. Funct. Anal. 262, no. 3, 1274–1308 (2012).
