= Georgy Mihailovich Kondratiev =

Soviet physicist (1887–1958)

Georgy Kondratiev
- Георгий Кондратьев
- Born: 17 June 1887; Saint Petersburg, Russian Empire
- Died: 11 August 1958 (aged 60); Saint Petersburg, Russian SFSR, Soviet Union
- Education: Saint Petersburg State University, Saint Petersburg State Polytechnic University
- Awards: Order of Lenin
- Scientific career
- Fields: Physics
- Workplaces: College of Precise Mechanics and Optics, Institute for Precise Mechanics and Optics

Georgy Mihailovich Kondratiev (Russian: Георгий Михайлович Кондратьев, 17 June 1887 – 11 August 1958) was a Russian physicist, specialist in thermal measurements.

== Biography ==
Graduated from Saint Petersburg State University in 1912 and from Saint Petersburg State Polytechnic University in 1923. In 1917-1918 attended High Course of Pedagogic.

From 1924 to 1943 was a head of a laboratory and a head of a department in the Research Institute of Meteorology in Leningrad. In 1932 became chairman of Thermal Insulation Committee and a member of The Central board of Scientific and Technical Society of Energetic Industry Workers.

From the year 1935 took significant part in scientific life of many institutes, like Leningrad Region State Institute for Thermal Machine Engineering, Institute of Refractory Materials, etc. In 1936 became professor of Leningrad Institute for Cooling Industry.

In 1940 Georgy Kondratiev received Doctor degree.

In Leningrad Institute for Precise Mechanics and Optics Georgy Kondratiev occupied several positions: head of the Heat-control Department (1938-1942); head of the Physics Department (1949-1950); head of the Thermal Physics Department (1948); and head of the Thermal and Measurement Devices Department (1956-1958). From 1948-1952 was elected Dean of Department of Engineering and Physics department.

Georgy Condratiev founded scientific school of heat and mass exchange in instrumentation area. Also, Georgy Condratiev developed a few devices.

in 1949 he was awarded USSR State Prize for design of devices that were able to measure material heat properties in a short time. In 1957 he was awarded degree of Honoured master of sciences and engineering.

He also was awarded Order of Lenin, Order of the Red Star, Medal "For the Defence of Stalingrad" and by Medal "For Valiant Labour in the Great Patriotic War 1941–1945".
