= Mykola Kondratyuk =

Soviet and Ukrainian singer, opera singer, music educator (1931–2006)

Mykola Kondratyuk Микола Кондратюк
- Born: 5 May 1931; Starokostiantyniv, Ukrainian SSR, Soviet Union
- Died: 16 November 2006 (aged 75) Kyiv, Ukraine
- Genre: Classical
- Occupations: Singer; Teacher
- Instrument: Singing

Mykola Kindratovych Kondratyuk (Note: Ukrainian: Микола Кіндратович Кондратюк; Russian: Николай Кондратьевич Кондратюк, romanized: Nikolay Kondratyevich Kondratyuk) (5 May 1931 – 16 November 2006) was a Soviet and Ukrainian Chamber concert and opera singer (baritone), educator, social activist. People's Artist of the USSR (1978).

Born in Starokostiantyniv, Kondratyuk was a member of the CPSU since 1961. Deputy of the Supreme Soviet of the Ukrainian SSR of the 9th and 10th convocations. Kondratyuk died in Kyiv.
