= Kandrat Karsalin =

Belarusian portrait painter

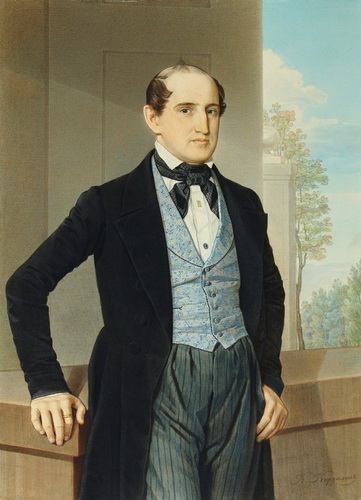
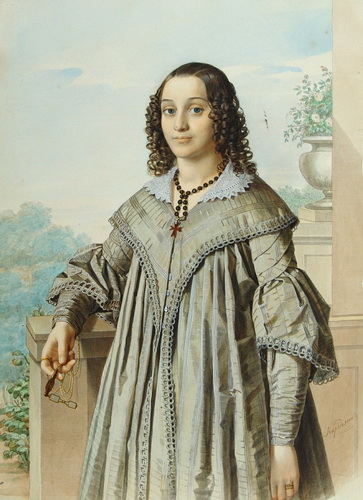
Double portrait of Kozma Daragan (1809-1874), Titular Counsellor in Irkutsk and his wife, Hannah.

Kandrat Ilich Karsalin, or Kondraty Ilyich Korsalin (Belarusian: Кандрат Ільіч Карсалін; 21 March 1809, Slutsk - c.1883, Slutsk?) was a portrait painter from the Russian Empire.

== Biography ==
Born to a middle-class family, he received his primary education at home. Around the age of twelve, he taught himself to paint and worked as an assistant to the local icon painters. He was twenty before he had lessons from a professional artist; Thomas Hesse (1807-c.1870), a Baltic-German painter from Vilnius who had settled in Slutsk to become an art teacher at the gymnasium.

After 1830, he lived in Oryol and, in 1835, presented his portraits of local notables at an exhibition given by the Imperial Academy. The following year, he was able to begin auditing classes at the Academy, but he had insufficient means to pursue his studies there, failed to find financial support, and was forced to quit. Nevertheless, in 1839, he was awarded the title of "Free Artist".

That same year, he enlisted as an artist with the 12th Russian Spiritual Mission to China; arriving in Beijing in 1840. He remained there for only three years; having to leave before his contract expired, due to illness. His only known work on a Chinese theme is a view of a country palace near the city, painted in 1860 and preserved at the Russian Museum.

He returned by way of Irkutsk, where he lived for several years, where he was engaged to paint portraits of the local officials, then settled in Saint Petersburg in 1846 after being dismissed. In 1854, he was named an "Academician". He provided icons for the church in the new Russian Consulate at Hakodate in 1861. He also participated in decorating the Cathedral of St. Mary Magdalene, Warsaw, which opened in 1869.

In the 1870s, he began to suffer from an eye disease and, through the intercession of Grigory Gagarin and Fyodor Bruni, was awarded a state pension. Little is known of him beyond that point. He is last mentioned as a homeowner in a document from the National Historical Archive of Belarus, dated 1883.
