= Vladyslav Kondratyev =

Ukrainian basketball player

Vladyslav Kondratiev
No. 15 – Budivelnyk Kyiv
- Position: Forward
- League: UA SuperLeague; Euroleague

Personal information
- Born: September 19, 1990 (age 36) Dudinka, Russia
- Listed height: 6 ft 8 in (2.03 m)
- Listed weight: 224 lb (102 kg)

Career information
- NBA draft: 2013: undrafted
- Playing career: 2013–present

Career history
- 2013–2014: Kyiv
- 2014–2015: Dnipro-Azot
- 2015–present: Budivelnyk

Vladyslav Kondratiev (born February 19, 1990) is a Ukrainian professional basketball player for Budivelnyk Kyiv of the UA SuperLeague.

Studied at Bryant University playing three season for Bulldogs in NCAA.
