= Bastard toadflax =

Bastard toadflax or bastard-toadflax is a common name for a plant which may refer to:

- Comandra
- Thesium humifusum
