= Green woodpecker =

There are four species of bird named green woodpecker:

- European green woodpecker, Picus viridis
- Iberian green woodpecker, Picus sharpei
- Japanese green woodpecker, Picus awokera
- Cuban green woodpecker, Xiphidiopicus percussus
