= Whitehawk Hill =

Nature reserve in Brighton, England

Coordinates: 50.828°N 0.110°W

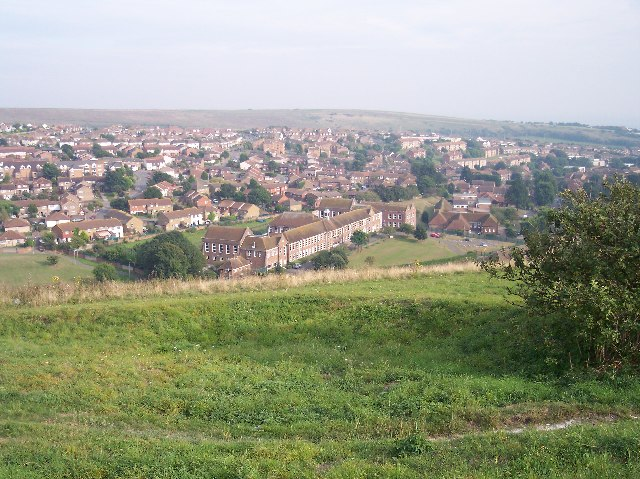
- Interactive map of Whitehawk Hill
- Type: Local Nature Reserve
- Location: Brighton, East Sussex
- OS grid: TQ 332 049
- Area: 50.3 hectares (124 acres)
- Manager: Brighton and Hove City Council

Whitehawk Hill is a 50.3-hectare (124-acre) Local Nature Reserve in Brighton, East Sussex. It is owned and managed by Brighton and Hove City Council.

At the top of the hill is Whitehawk Camp, a Neolithic causewayed enclosure which is a Scheduled Monument.

This is species-rich chalk grassland which has views over Brighton and the sea, together with the Isle of Wight on clear days. There are colonies of chalkhill blue butterflies. The 45 metre high Whitehawk Hill transmitting station is at the summit.
