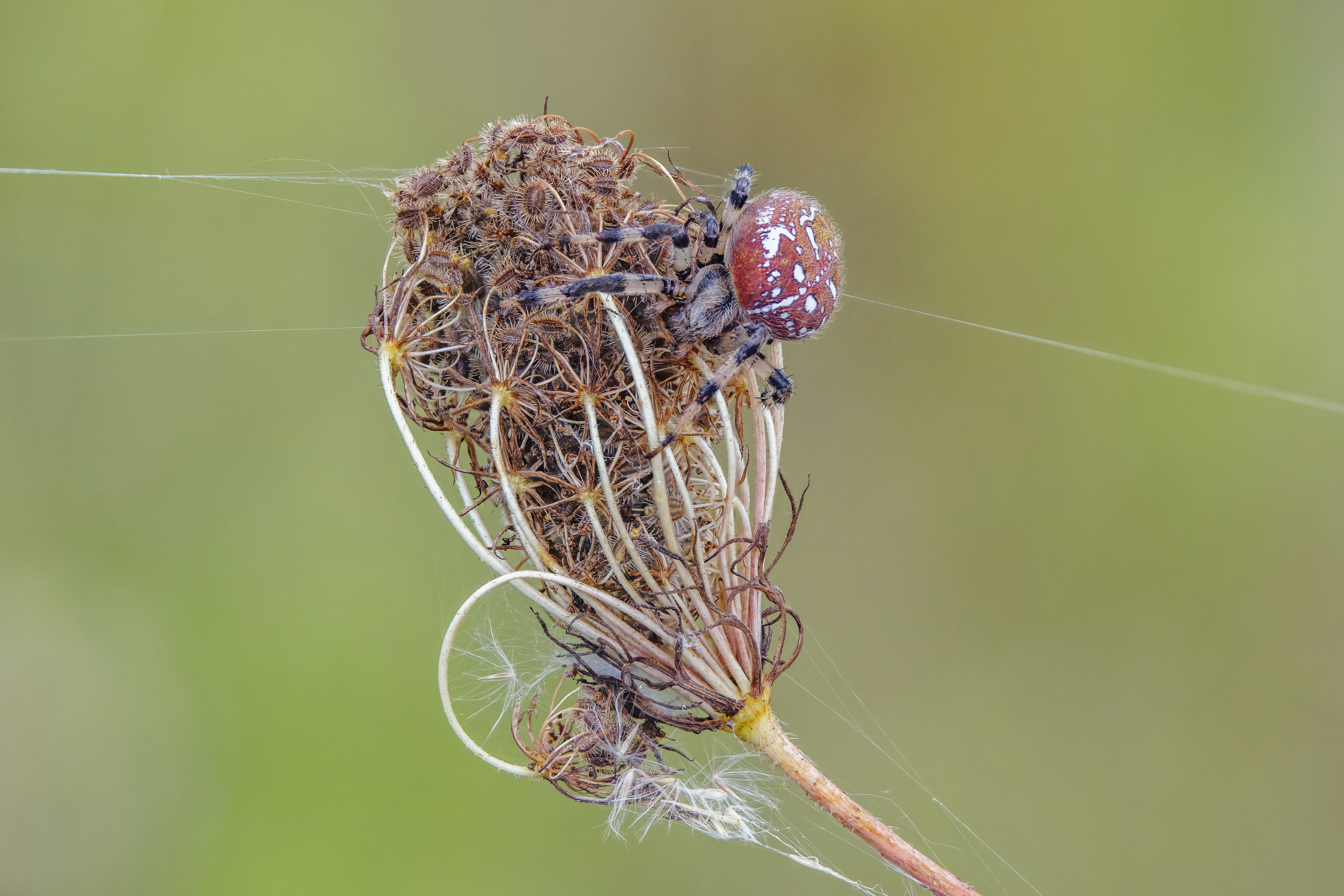

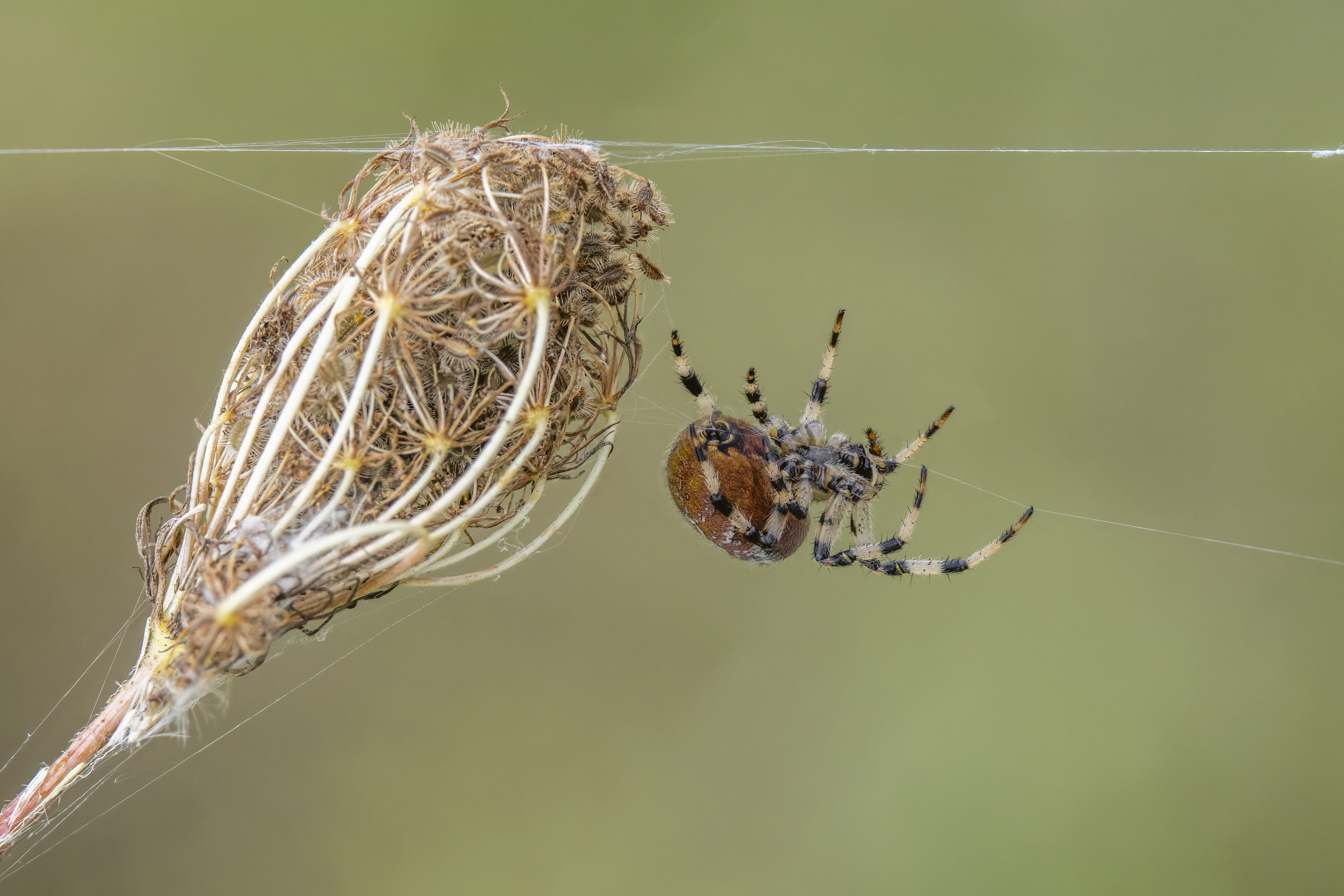

Scientific classification
- Kingdom: Animalia
- Phylum: Arthropoda
- Subphylum: Chelicerata
- Class: Arachnida
- Order: Araneae
- Infraorder: Araneomorphae
- Family: Araneidae
- Genus: Araneus
- Species: A. quadratus

Binomial name
- Araneus quadratus Clerck, 1757

Synonyms
- Aranea reaumurii Aranea quadrimaculata Epeira quadrata Aranea reaumuri Araneus flavidus

= Araneus quadratus =

Four-spot orb-weaver

Species of spider

Araneus quadratus, the four-spot orb-weaver, is a common orb-weaver spider found in Europe and Central Asia, and as far as the Kamchatka Peninsula and Japan. Females can reach 17 mm in length, especially when gravid, with males around half that. They are quite variable in appearance, ranging from brown to bright orange or green, but they always have the characteristic four white spots on the abdomen. The darker color morphs are easier to identify, due to the contrast between the white spots and the rest of the body. The legs are sometimes brightly striped.

A female eats a crane fly

The spider lives in gardens, wooded areas, or wherever there is vegetation to string an orb web across. This species builds its web close to the ground to catch jumping insects such as small grasshoppers. The female builds the more elaborate web, complete with a funnel-shaped retreat off to the side where she goes during inclement weather. The web is smaller and closer to the ground than those of other species of orb-weavers.

Adult females can actively change their color. About three days are needed to take on colors that accurately match their resting surfaces.

== Subspecies ==
- A. q. minimus (Gétaz, 1889) (Switzerland, France)
- A. q.s subviridis (Franganillo, 1913) (Spain)
