= Castle Hill, Brighton =

Protected area in East Sussex, England

Coordinates: 50.841°N 0.053°W

Castle Hill
- Site of Special Scientific Interest
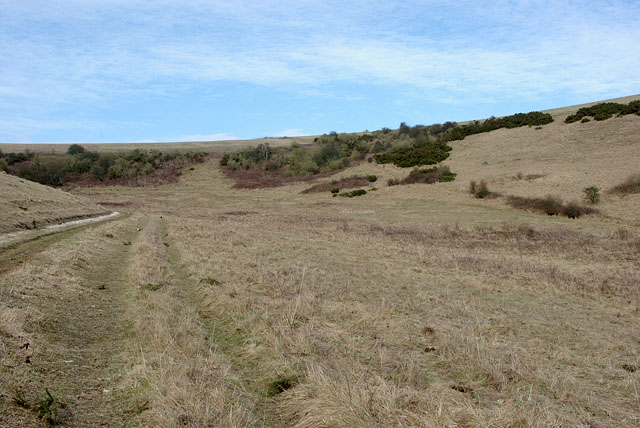
- Location of Castle Hill.
- Area of search: East Sussex
- Grid reference: TQ 372 064
- Interest: Biological
- Area: 114.6 hectares (283 acres)
- Notification date: 1986
- Location map: Magic Map

Castle Hill is a 114.6-hectare (283-acre) biological Site of Special Scientific Interest on the eastern outskirts of Brighton in East Sussex. It is a Special Area of Conservation and Nature Conservation Review site. The northern half is a national nature reserve

This is chalk grassland, which is a nationally uncommon habitat. It is rich in flowering plants and there are areas of scrub which are valuable for breeding birds.

There are often early spider orchids in springtime, when the cowslips are still in flower. In June there are burnished green-and-copper leaf beetles nestling in the yellow heads of hawkbit. In a good summer the hillside is dusted pink with fragrant, pyramidal, bee, burnt tip and spotted orchids and sometime our rare endemic early gentian.

There is much that is rare and special here including the plants: Nottingham catchfly, dodder and field fleawort; the butterflies: adonis, small and chalkhill blue, clouded yellow and dark green fritillary; the moths: small purple-barred, purple-barred, forester, mother shipton and burnet companion moths; rare bees, including some long thought to be locally extinct and only recently re-discovered; crickets including the wartbiter bush-cricket, dark bush-cricket, coneheads and scarce stripe-winged grasshoppers.
