= Church of Saint Pancras =

Church of Saint Pancras may refer to:

== Italy ==
- San Pancrazio, a basilica in Rome
- San Pancrazio (Florence), a deconsecrated church
- San Pancrazio (Genoa)
- San Pancrazio, Sestino

== United Kingdom ==
- St Pancras Old Church, a 4th-century church in St Pancras, London
- St Pancras New Church, a 19th-century church built nearby when the above fell into disrepair
- St Pancras, Soper Lane, in the City of London, destroyed in the Great Fire of 1666
- St Pancras Church, Exeter, in Devon
- St Pancras Church, Ipswich, in Suffolk
- St Pancras Church, Kingston near Lewes, in East Sussex
- Church of St Pancras, West Bagborough, in Somerset
- Church of St Pancras, Widecombe-in-the-Moor, in Devon
- Church of St Agnes and St Pancras, Toxteth Park, in Liverpool, Lancashire
- Lewes Priory, in Sussex

== Uruguay ==
- Inmaculado Corazón de María (San Pancracio), Montevideo

== See also ==
- San Pancrazio (disambiguation)
- St. Pancras (disambiguation)
