= San Pancrazio (disambiguation) =

San Pancrazio is a Roman Catholic basilica in Rome, Italy.

San Pancrazio may also refer to:

== Saints ==
- Pancras of Taormina, 1st-century bishop and martyr
- Pancras of Rome, martyred c. 304 CE

== Churches ==
- San Pancrazio, Florence, Italy
- San Pancrazio, Genoa, Italy
- San Pancrazio, Sestino, Italy

== Places ==
- San Pancrazio, a frazione of Palazzolo sull'Oglio, Italy
- San Pancrazio, a frazione of San Casciano in Val di Pesa, Italy
- San Pancrazio, an island of the Brissago Islands, Switzerland

== See also ==
- Church of Saint Pancras (disambiguation)
- St Pancras (disambiguation)
- St. Pankraz (disambiguation)
