= St. Pancras =

St Pancras, St. Pancras or Saint Pancras may refer to:

== Saints ==
- Pancras of Taormina, legendary bishop, according to legend martyred in AD 40 in Sicily
- Pancras of Rome, martyred c. 304 AD, after whom the following are directly or indirectly named:

== Geography ==
=== United Kingdom ===
- St Pancras, London, a district of London
  - St Pancras Old Church, a medieval church after which the district was named
  - St Pancras New Church, a 19th-century church built when the above fell into disrepair
  - St Pancras and Islington Cemetery, in East Finchley, opened when the churchyard became full
  - St Pancras Hospital, occupying the former workhouse and surrounding the old churchyard
  - St Pancras railway station, a national and international railway station
  - St Pancras Renaissance London Hotel, attached to the railway station
  - King's Cross St Pancras tube station, a London Underground station attached to the railway station
  - Metropolitan Borough of St Pancras, a local government area (1900-1965)
- St Pancras, Soper Lane, a church in the City of London
- St Pancras, a church in the village of West Bagborough, Somerset
- Church of St. Agnes and St. Pancras, Toxteth Park, a church in Liverpool, Merseyside
- St Pancras Church, Ipswich, a church in Ipswich, Suffolk
- Priory of St Pancras, Cluniac priory in Lewes, Sussex
- St Pancras Church (Kingston near Lewes), 13th-century church in East Sussex
- St Pancras Church, Exeter
- Church of Saint Pancras, Widecombe-in-the-Moor, Devon

=== Rest of the world ===
- Sint Pancras, a village in North Holland, Netherlands
- St. Pankraz, South Tyrol, Italy
- Sankt Pankraz, Austria
- Pankrác, a neighborhood of Prague and its metro station, named for the Svatý Pankrác church
- Parish Church of the Immaculate Heart of Mary and St. Pancras, Montevideo, Uruguay

== See also ==
- Church of Saint Pancras (disambiguation)
- San Pancrazio (disambiguation)
- Saint-Pancrace (disambiguation)
