= Kingston near Lewes =

Village and parish in East Sussex, England

Coordinates: 50.86°N 0.02°W

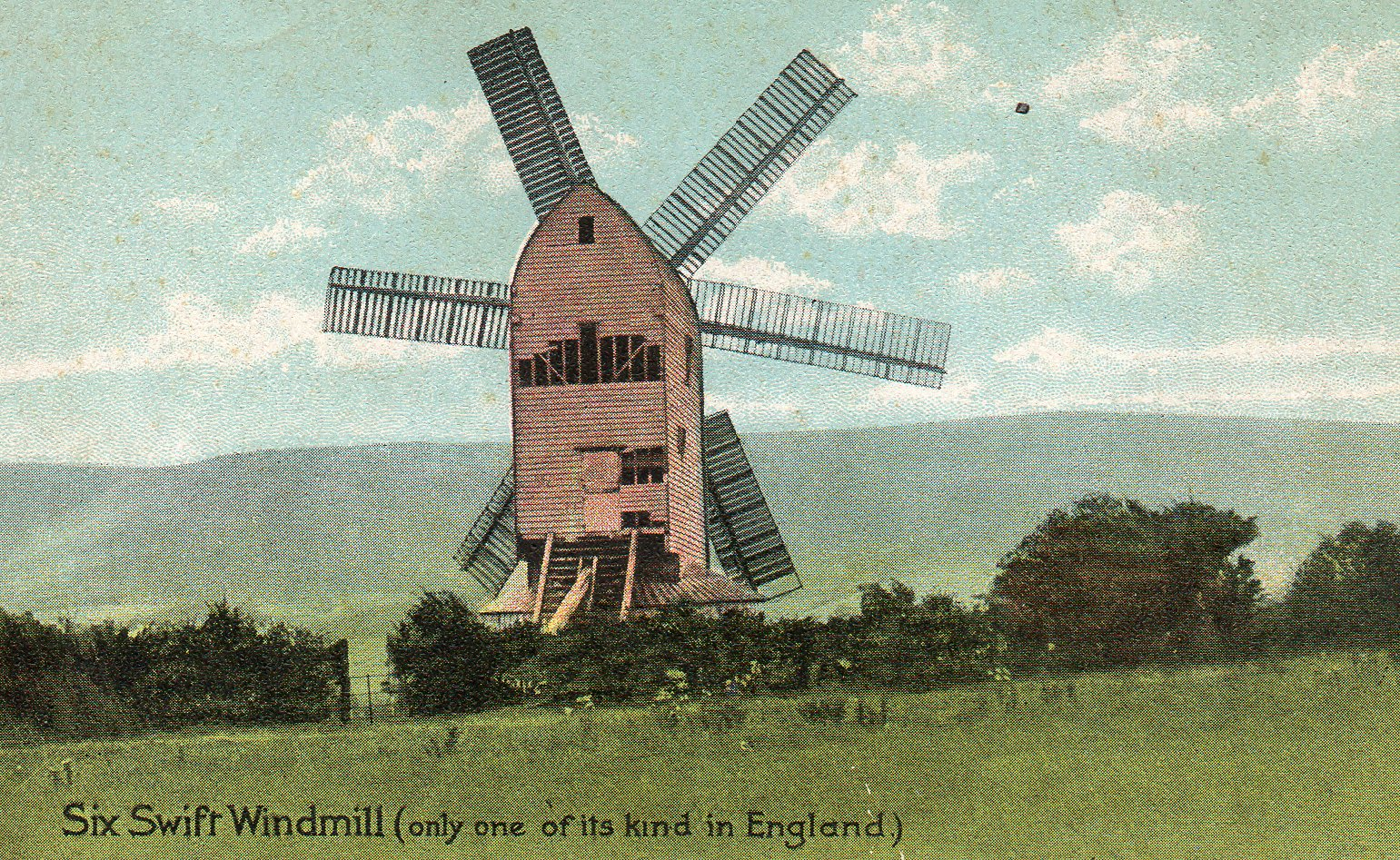
- Original Ashcombe Mill

- Location within East Sussex
- Area: 5.7 km^{2} (2.2 sq mi)
- Population: 831 (2011)
  - Density: 383/sq mi (148/km^{2})
- OS grid reference: TQ394083
  - London: 45 miles (72 km) N
- District: Lewes
- Shire county: East Sussex
- Region: South East
- Country: England
- Sovereign state: United Kingdom
- Post town: LEWES
- Postcode district: BN7
- Dialling code: 01273
- Police: Sussex
- Fire: East Sussex
- Ambulance: South East Coast
- UK Parliament: Lewes
- Website: Kingston PC

Kingston near Lewes is a village and civil parish in the Lewes District of East Sussex, England. The village is mentioned in the Domesday Book and is located two miles (3.2 km) south of Lewes and is nestled in the South Downs. The parish is part of two Sites of Special Scientific Interest: the Lewes Brooks and Kingston Escarpment and Iford Hill.

== Overview ==
The village is small and situated at the base of the South Downs. Features include the primary school, village hall, riding stables, and the local pub, The Juggs, which is housed in a 14th-century cottage and now leased to the Kentish brewer Shepherd Neame. The pub and Juggs Lane (a road used as a public path which runs by it), are named after the fish-carrying baskets used by Brighton fishwives on their way through Kingston to the market at Lewes. The path may still be traversed by foot, but is unsuitable for vehicles (though legal for them), and continues to the Brighton and Hove at Woodingdean.

Many of the older houses are in the original village centre, "The Street", a picturesque mixture of cottages and larger farmhouses that leads past St Pancras Church and the village pound, where stray sheep were once kept, to the South Downs Way.

During the 1930s to 1950s, a number of substantial houses were built on Kingston Ridge and in the early 1960s orchard land was developed to form what is known locally as "the estate", family houses that helped serve the establishment of the University of Sussex at that time. During the construction of the estate, a new village green, St. Pancras Green, was built. It features tennis courts and a cricket ground, and in summer supports occasional rounds of the traditional Sussex game of stoolball. The radical reputation of the university influx earned this new green the nickname "Red Square" from some of the more traditional locals.

The Prime Meridian passes to the east of Kingston near Lewes.

== Notable buildings and areas ==
Notable areas around Kingston

The Kingston parish is long and thin and runs from Rise Farm in the Lewes Brooks, to the east, to Woodingdean in the west, encompassing many different habitats with many important species. It crosses a block of Downland that is one of the brightest jewels of the South Downs. The Juggs Road runs out of Lewes through the west end of Kingston and right the way to Newmarket Hill. It is an old trail used by Stone Age people and medieval fishing folk. This area of the Brighton Downs retained unbroken its ancient Down pasture mantle along this road until the 1950s since when it has been put under the plough, like so much of our downland. Nevertheless the area contains some special parts.

To the north of the parish lies Lewes, St Ann Without and Falmer, to its west is the City of Brighton and Hove and to its south and east is the Iford parish.

=== Landmarks ===
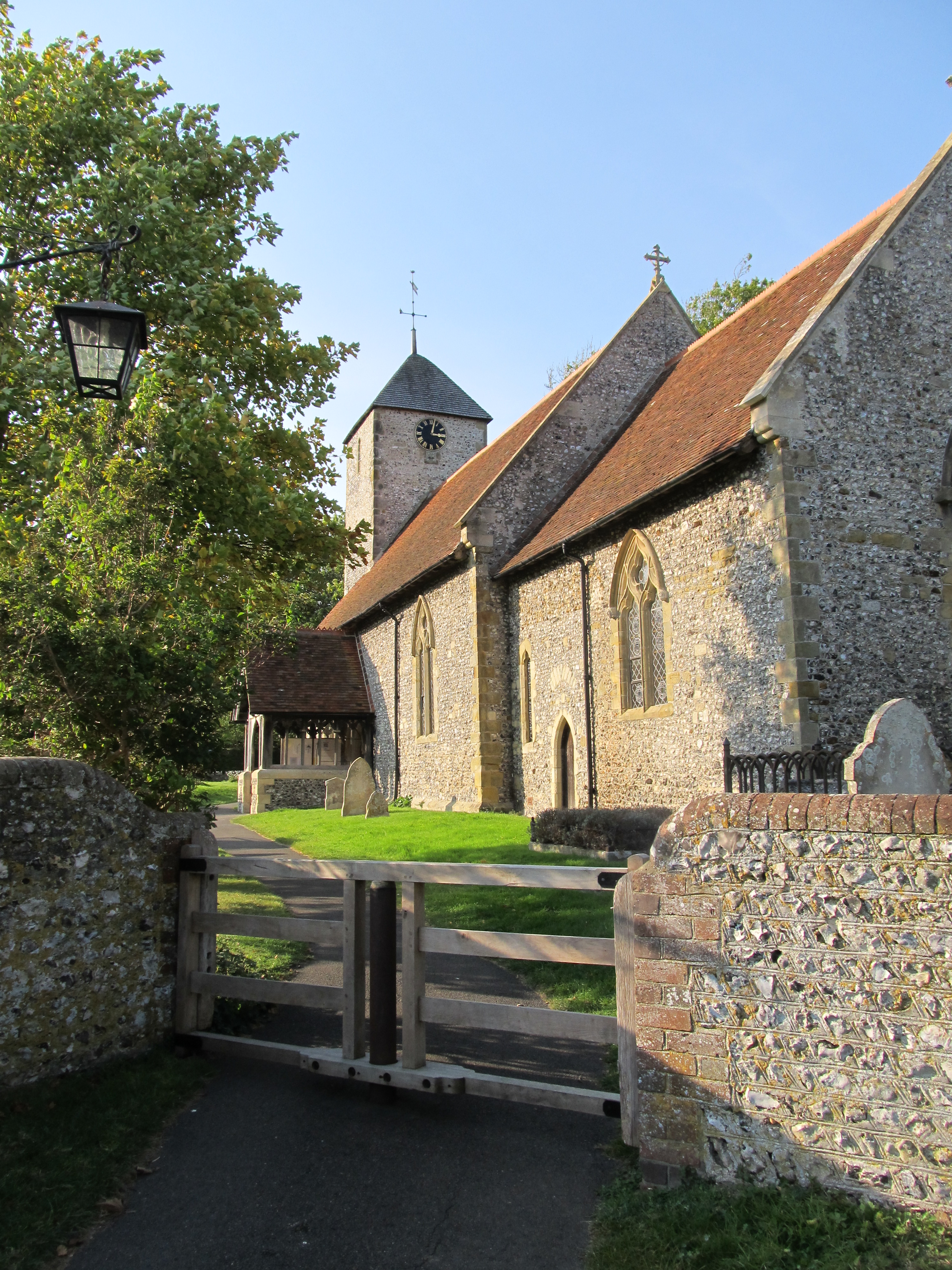
Tapsel gate at St Pancras Church, Kingston near Lewes

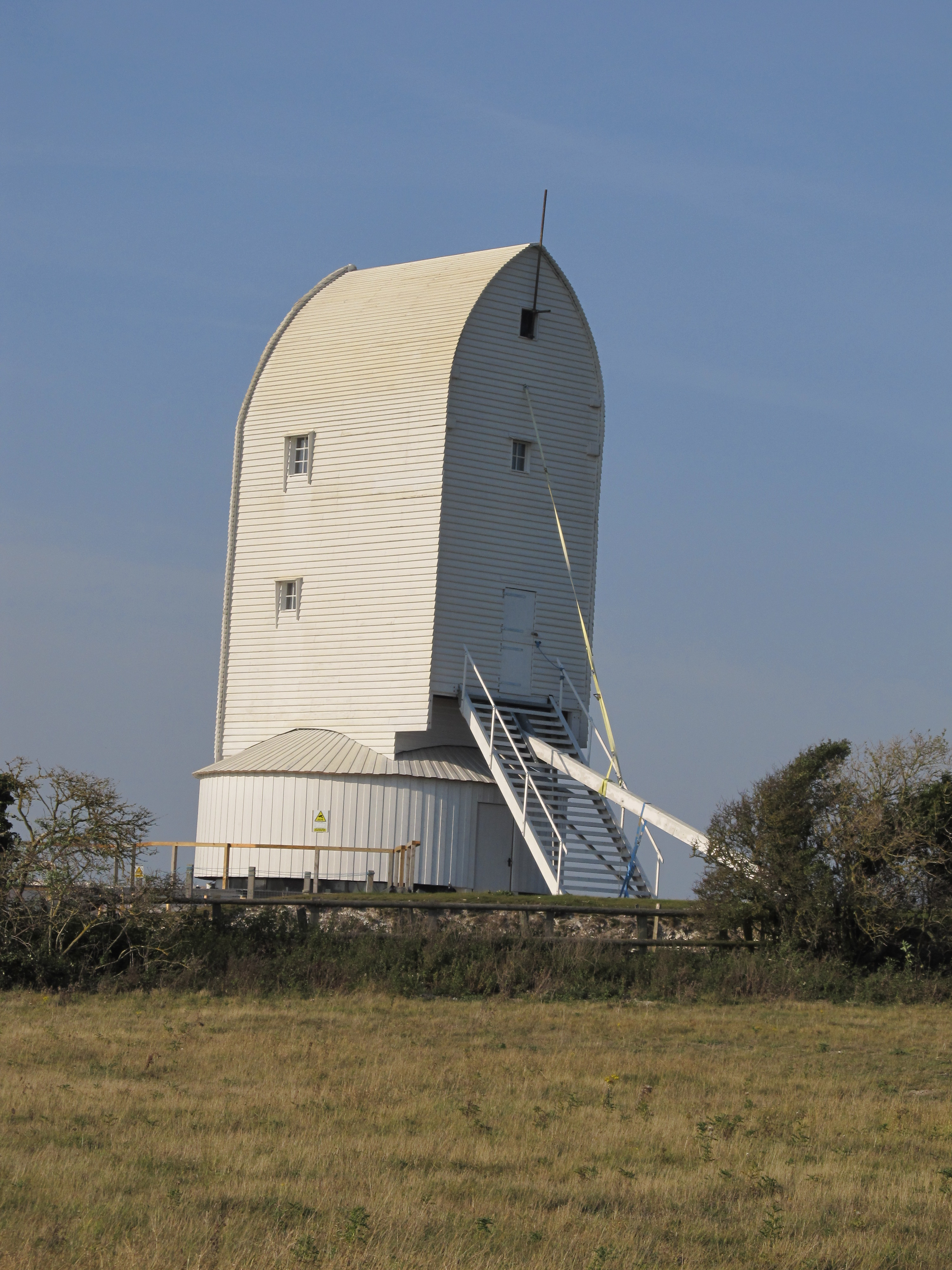
Rebuilt Ashcombe Mill

- The Norman parish St Pancras Church is dedicated to St. Pancras and has a distinctive Tapsel gate, with a central pivot which locals believe was designed to make it easy for funeral bearers to pass either side.
- Above Kingston, to the east of the village, stood Ashcombe Mill, a six-sailed post mill which collapsed in 1916. Planning permission was granted for the construction of a replica of the mill for residential purposes on the original site, which has since been built
- The downland above it is part of the Kingston Escarpment and Iford Hill SSSI.
- Westward of the village the land rises to a height of over 600 feet (180 m) at Kingston Hill and Newmarket Hill.
- Castle Hill, a Site of Special Scientific Interest, lies within the parish. The site, which extends into the Brighton district, is designated as National Nature Reserve because of its habitat of chalk grassland. Early spider-orchid and the wart-biter (a bush cricket) are two nationally rare species that are found here.

== Kingston Hill ==
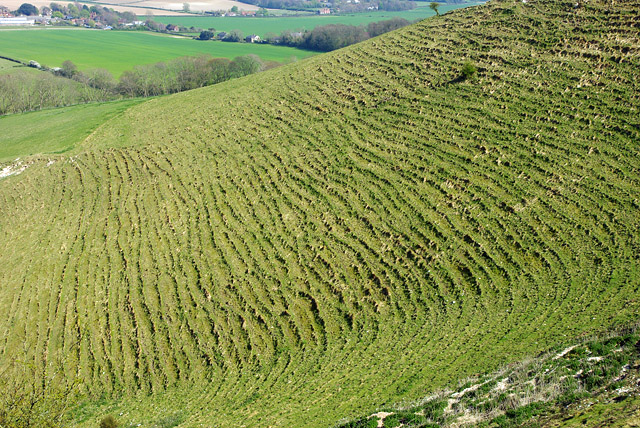
Terracettes above Kingston near Lewes

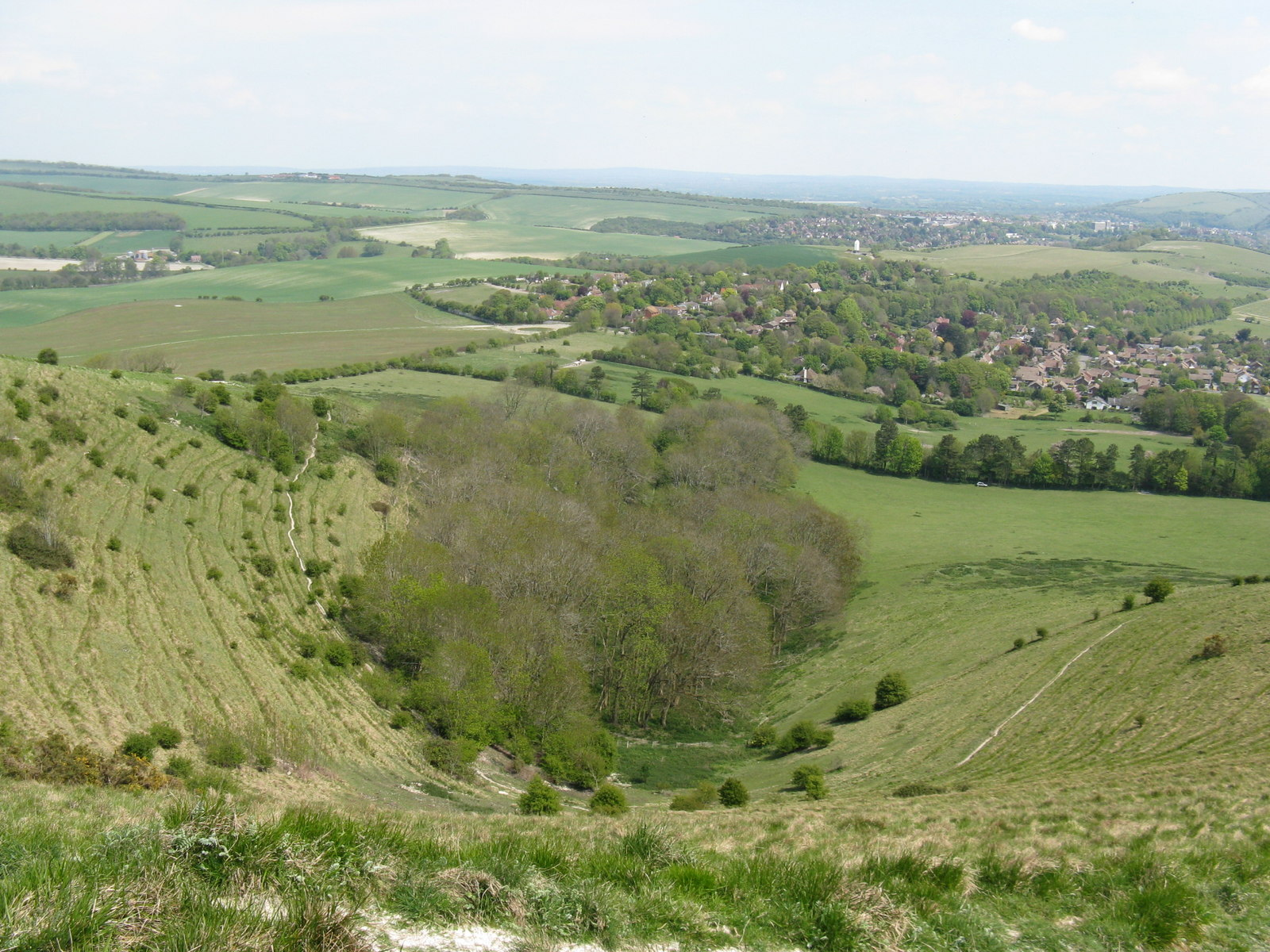
Terraced bowl above Kingston - geograph.org.uk - 1860985

Kingston Hill (TQ 380 080) is the main landmark of this western side of the Vale of the Brooks. Its face displays the partly-healed scars of two descending bostals, which are part of the Kingston Escarpment and Iford Hill SSSI. The top of the Hill is blessedly fenceless, with three dew ponds and a scatter of round barrows and gorse and thorn. The largest of the barrows now hides beneath a thicket of gorse beside two of the ponds.

Behind the Hill’s brow lies the delightful back slope, all mottled with gorse and ant hills and a patchwork of acidic and chalky soils. Few such gentle plateau areas have escaped the plough. Indeed most of this plateau beyond this back slope was ploughed, despite the protest of local people.

=== Cold Coombes ===
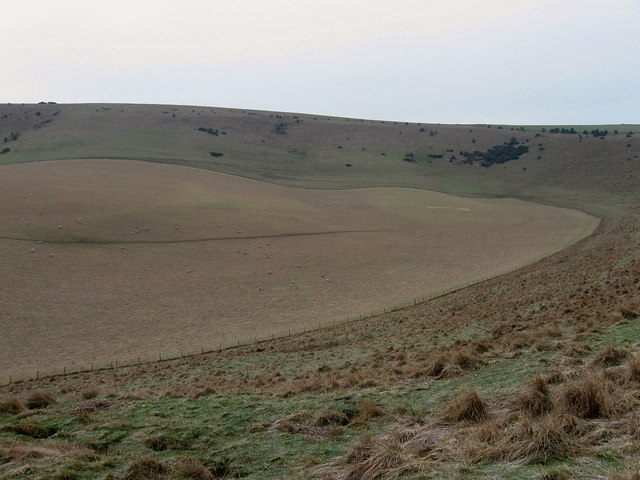
Cold Coombes

Cold Coombes (TQ 372 077) is a grand amphitheatre, eight hundred metres wide and often very steep. Much of it faces north away from the sun. It is access land, but - sadly - its single obscure walkers' entrance means that few people know of, or exercise their access rights there. Tussocky tor grass and dense scrub has taken hold, and can make difficult walking. Yet mountain birds, like ring ouzel, which breed in our northern uplands, on their way back and forth south to escape our winter, tarry at Cold Coombes.

In August the lower slopes can have great swarms of autumn ladies tresses, hound’s tongue, cowslips, violets and spring whitlow grass on old anthills. Chalkhill and adonis blue butterflies are also here, although in low numbers.

=== Castle Hill ===
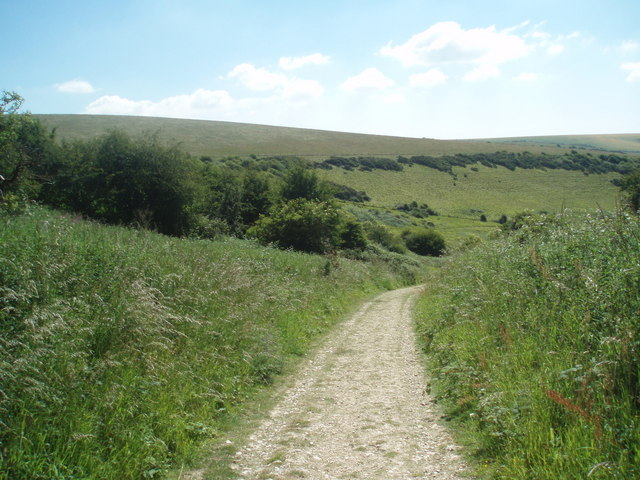
Castle Hill

The Juggs Road takes you as far as Castle Hill is to the west of Kingston. The ‘castle’ on the top of Castle Hill is a small rectangular enclosure with grassy banks. It might have been used for managing the sheep flocks, but it is not ancient. The southern slopes lie in the National Nature Reserve, but much of the rest is designated as a Site of Special Scientific Interest, and the farmer manages them well with intense sheep grazing. The wild flowers are more scattered where the slopes are shady, but there are plenty to see. In late autumn you may find waxcap fungi amongst the gorse. The combe north (TQ 380 072) still has an old flowery slope on its northern side, although a large rearing pen for game birds covers part of it.

Its south facing slope runs into Falmer and Standean Bottoms (TQ 37 06). On all sides they retain their virgin turf, fringed along their crests by gorse and thorn and dimpled only by gently descending pathways. In the morning and evening the valley will lie part under shadow, and at all times the southern slopes are shadier than the northern; some parts have deeper soils, some scarce any soil at all; some have a long sward and some a smooth, fine turf. The different habitats that result mean that the area is famed for its biodiversity, but it is particularly known for its orchids, which include the early spider-orchid, and its crickets, which include the wartbiter bush-cricket.

The eastern slope of Castle Hill (TQ 380 069) just round the corner from the Nature Reserve, is Access Land in its upper part. It holds some of the richest spots for Downland herbs on the East Sussex Downs.

=== Newmarket Hill ===
This is perhaps the saddest area of the parish. There is a mast near the top and the path is narrow with high barbed wire surrounding walkers and cyclists. However, seventy years ago Newmarket Hill (TQ 359 073) was a special and open place, as the top of Kingston Hill still is. The chalk downland was rich in wildlife and there were even juniper bushes, which are likely to have been there for thousands of years. There was evidence of prehistoric barrows and field systems. All of this has now been ploughed out and the areas is now an empty desert of arable and re-seeded pasture, and only tiny fragments of their ancient flowery grasslands have survived on steep unploughable slopes.

=== Lewes Brooks ===
Sometimes known as the Vale of the Brooks, the Kingston parish spans east as far as Rise Farm. There are fields with breeding lapwing in this area.

== Governance ==
At a local level Kingston is governed by Kingston Parish Council. Its responsibilities include footpaths, playgrounds and minor planning applications. The parish council has seven seats available which were uncontested in the May 2007 election.

The next level of government is the district council. The parish of Kingston lies within the Kingston ward of Lewes District Council, which returns a single seat to the council. The election on 4 May 2007 elected a Liberal Democrat. This ward stretches south to Piddinghoe and had a total population of 2,106 as of the 2011 Census.

East Sussex County Council is the next tier of government, for which Kingston is within the Newhaven and Ouse Valley West division, with responsibility for Education, Libraries, Social Services, Civil Registration, Trading Standards and Transport. Elections for the County Council are held every four years. The Liberal Democrat David Rogers OBE was elected in the 2005 election.

The UK Parliament constituency for Kingston is Lewes. The Conservative MP was Maria Caulfield who in 2015 replaced the Liberal Democrat Norman Baker, who had been constituency MP since 1997. As of July 2024, Liberal Democrat James MacCleary is the MP.

Prior to Brexit in 2020, the village was part of the South East England constituency in the European Parliament.

The parish of "Kingston near Lewes" was formed in 1894 when the parish of "Kingston" was abolished and split into "Kingston near Lewes" and "Kingston Urban" in the Municipal Borough of Lewes.

In July 2025 a consultation was launched over proposals to bring Kingston, alongside East Saltdean, Telscombe Cliffs, Peacehaven, and Newhaven into Brighton and Hove. This has been met by opposition from Lewes District Council and the local MP James MacCleary.
