= Pancreas (disambiguation) =

The Pancreas is an organ of animal bodies.

Pancreas may also refer to:

- Pancreas (song), by "Weird Al" Yankovic

== See also ==
- St. Pancras (disambiguation)
