= St. Pankraz =

St. Pankraz may refer to:

- St. Pankraz, South Tyrol, municipality in South Tyrol in northern Italy
- St. Pankraz (Upper Austria), municipality in the district of Kirchdorf in the Austrian state of Upper Austria

== See also ==
- St. Pancras (disambiguation)
