= Palazzo Malvezzi Campeggi, Bologna =

Coordinates: 44°29′45.00″N 11°20′57.03″E

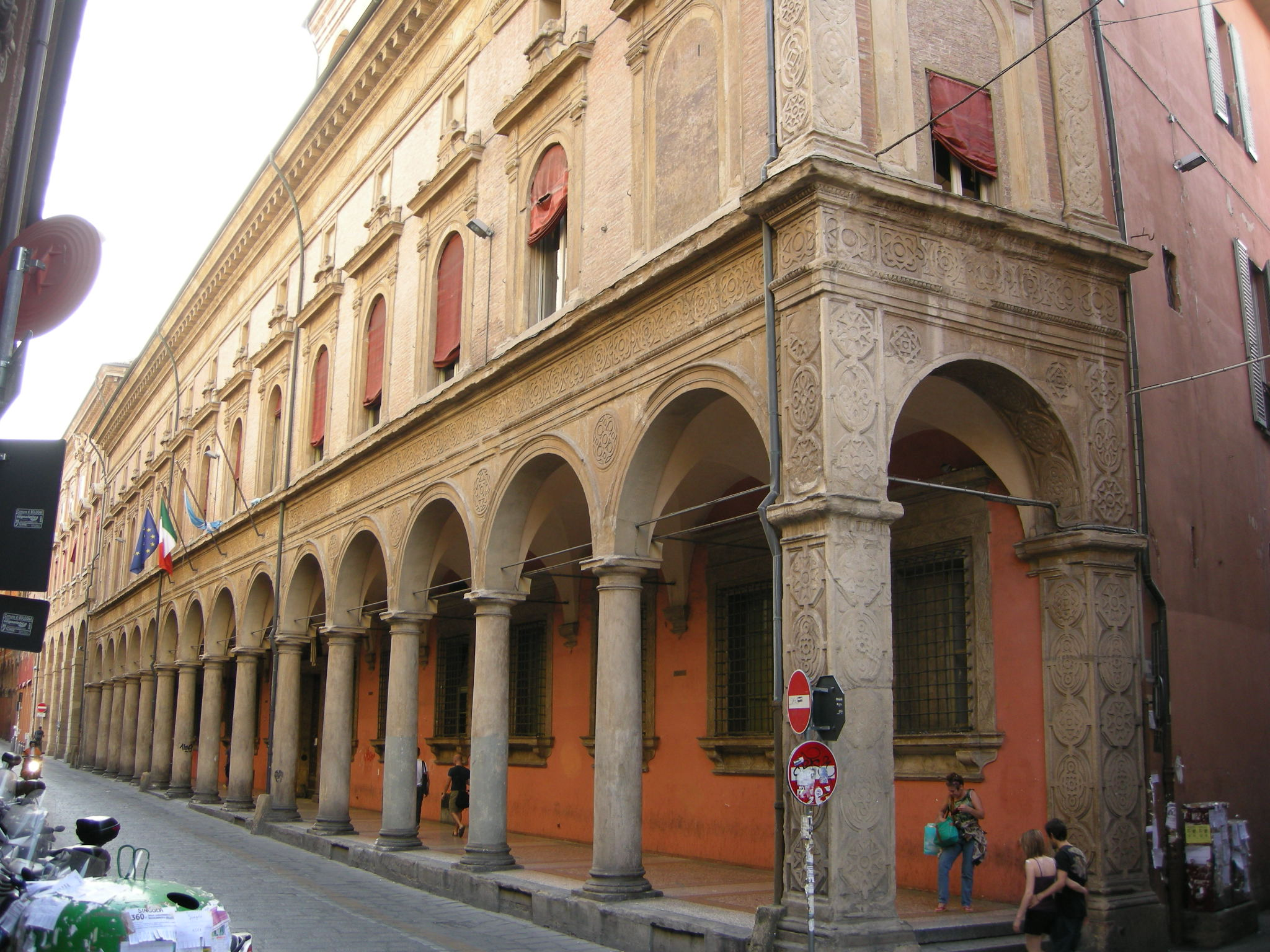
Palazzo Malvezzi Campeggi

Palazzo Malvezzi Campeggi is a Renaissance palace located on Via Zamboni number 22, at the corner (southwest) with Via Marsala, in central Bologna, region of Emilia Romagna, Italy. It stands across from San Giacomo Maggiore, and just northeast of the Palazzo Magnani. It presently houses the law faculty of the University of Bologna.

== History ==
Construction on the palace began in the mid-1500s atop an older structure belonging to Giovanni II Bentivoglio. The architects were Marchesi Andrea Di Pietro, called Il Formigine, and his brother Giacomo. It was sold to the prominent aristocratic Malvezzi family. The internal courtyard has the three orders of superimposed columns: doric, ionic, and corinthian with medallions depicting the main Roman emperors. In the entrance is a large statue of Hercules by Giuseppe Maria Mazza.

The Piano Nobile was designed only in the 18th century, and was frescoed by Carlo Lodi and Antonio Rossi. Some of the frescoes exalt the military prowess of Malvezzi men, including Emilio Malvezzi, who fought for King Sigismund II of Poland. The stucco work of Carlo Nessi link the heraldic symbols of the Malvezzi and Campeggi families, united in 1707 by the marriage of Matteo Malvezzi and Francesca Maria Campeggi. Other rooms were decorated by Vittorio Bigari, Gioacchino Pizzoli, and Giovanni Benedetto Paolazzi. The courtyard was damaged during World War II.
