= Newmarket Hill, East Sussex =

Hill in East Sussex, England

Newmarket Hill
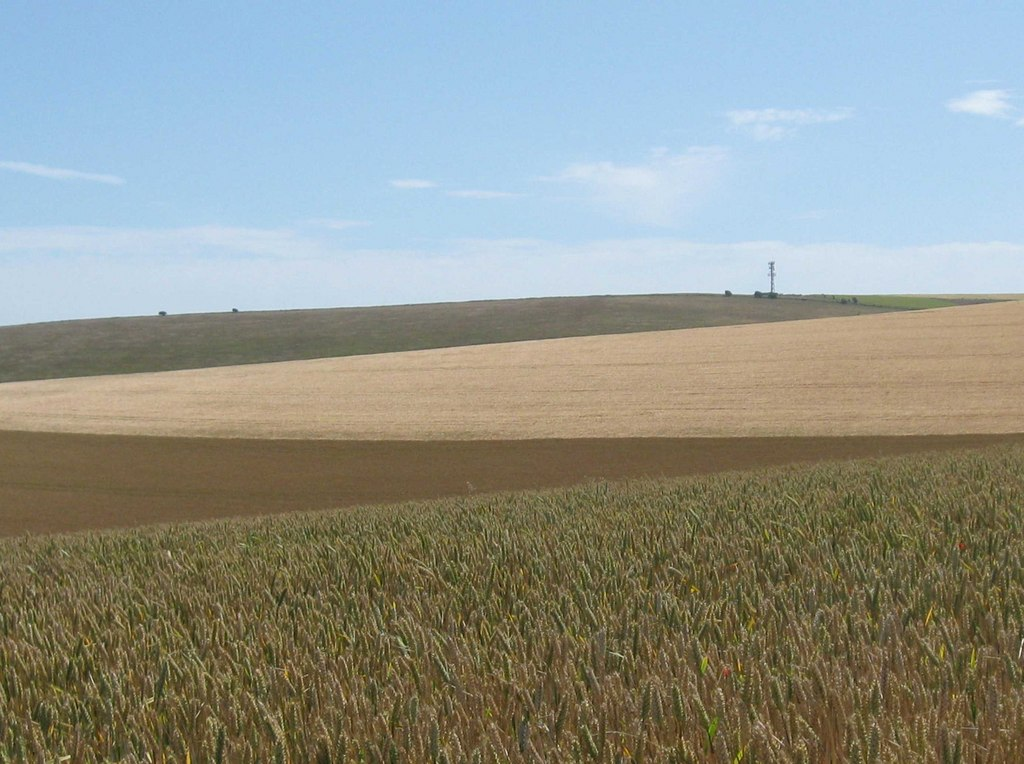
- Newmarket Hill

Highest point
- Elevation: 200 metres (656 ft)
- Prominence: 107 m (351 ft)
- Coordinates: 50.843796°N 0.0668°W

Geography
- Location: East Sussex, England
- OS grid: TQ362067
- Topo map(s): OS Explorers: 122 – Brighton & Hove

Newmarket Hill is situated in the parish of Kingston near Lewes. It is located midway between, and within walking distance of, two of the most important population centres in East Sussex, Brighton and Lewes.

== Geography ==
Whilst the top of Newmarket Hill is in the parish of Kingston near Lewes, its northern slopes are in the parish of Falmer, and its southern slopes are in the parish of Rottingdean. It is 200m (656 feet) high, and is the highest hill in the area, with a prominence of 105m. It has therefore been classified as a Hump.

Like much of the Downs to the east of the River Adur the lack of a coastal plain has resulted in a strong maritime influence – frequent salt laden winds – which have helped maintain an open character to the hills. This has resulted in Newmarket Hill and the surrounding Downs being favoured for sheep grazing.

== Geology ==
The geology of Newmarket Hill is that of a bedrock of upper chalk, partially overlain by clay-with-flints.

== History ==
=== Prehistory ===
In 1976 half of a polished Neolithic ceremonial axe head was found. An ancient route passed over the hill from Brighton to Lewes which was presumed to have been used in Roman times. A small hoard of Roman coins is recorded as having been found adjacent to it on or near the hilltop (TQ363070). The route is known as Juggs Road (otherwise known as Juggs Lane, or Juggs Way), and is an example of an ancient ridgeway. It was named after the Brighton fishwives who transported their fish for the market in Lewes by donkey in either baskets or earthenware jugs. Jug or Jugg was a nickname for the Brighton fisherman.

=== Military reviews and sham fights ===
When the Brighton Pavilion became a Royal residence in 1783, troops were stationed in Brighton. Large military reviews and sham fights for the spectacle of the general public were often held on the Downs beyond the Brighton Racecourse during the following 100 years. Newmarket Hill, the highest hill in its vicinity, is often mentioned as being involved in such mock battles.

On one occasion in 1797, with the Prince of Wales in attendance on Newmarket Hill, a giant water-spout defeated the whole army and soaked the spectators. It was the exact shape of an inverted church steeple.

In 1810, again with the Prince of Wales and many other individuals from high society in attendance, some 10,000 troops were watched by 30,000 spectators in the vicinity of Newmarket Hill. This was at a time when Brighton had a population of only about 10,000 people, and the nearby county town of Lewes, less than 3,000.

With the later advent of railways, in 1862 19,000 troops were able to be involved in the Battle of White Hawk Down. One of the purposes of this exercise was to evaluate the use of rail transport as an aid for troop movements. The railway network successfully transported that day over 132,000 troops and other passengers for the occasion. Again, Newmarket Hill was a strategic point in this exercise.

=== John Dudeney ===
John Dudeney (his surname was pronounced like the word scrutiny) was one of Sussex's most famous shepherds. He tended the Kingston flock of 1,400 sheep on Newmarket Hill from 1799 to 1802. It was here that he dug himself a library out of the chalk for his books which he bought with money from catching wheatears and moles. By this means he taught himself astronomy, French, Latin, Hebrew, mathematics, and European history. Thus it was that he was soon able to become a school teacher in Lewes.

=== Newmarket Farm ===
In about 1830, at or shortly before the Kingston Enclosures, a farm labourers cottage and barn was built. It was:

"at the northern crest of the hill, a cattle fold, with barn and outbuildings, and a cottage for a labourer to attend to the stock. The cottage is an unusually substantial and comfortable house, built of flint and surrounded by a little patch of garden land."

It was occupied for a little over a hundred years until its requisition in 1942 by the military authorities. All of the surrounding downland between Woodingdean and Kingston near Lewes was similarly requisitioned for military exercises, which resulted its destruction and subsequent demolition by the end of the war.

In 1925 it was bought, along with the Balsdean and Norton farms to the south, by Brighton Corporation to prevent its previous owner, Oscar Selbach (father of the famous racing cyclist Maurice Selbach), from realising his property development plans. They wished to protect the Balsdean Valley watershed so it could provide drinking water for Brighton, and also for its amenity value.

=== Recent history ===
On 19 November 1944 a United States Army Air Force, Douglas C-47 Skytrain (43-15046) was en route from Châteaudun, France to RAF Greenham Common, Berkshire. The aircraft crashed into Newmarket Hill at a height of 600 feet due to low clouds, killing 25 of the 30 passengers & crew on board.

== Walks ==
There are many walks that have been described:

- The South Downs Way – Eastbourne, Newmarket Hill, Winchester – 160 km (99 miles)
- A walk to visit Newmarket Hill – Lewes, Newmarket Hill, Balmer, Lewes – 20.07 km
- WalkingWorld.com – Lewes, Breaky Bottom, Undercliff Walk, Brighton Marina – 12 miles
- Peter Lovett's ramblings – Woodingdean, Balsdean, Newmarket Hill, Woodingdean – 6 miles
- Woodingdean Circular – Woodingdean, Newmarket Hill, South Downs Way, Balsdean, Woodingdean – 7 miles
