= Saint-Pancrace =

Saint-Pancrace may refer to three place names in France:

- Saint-Pancrace, Alpes-Maritimes, in the region of Provence-Alpes-Côte d'Azur
- Saint-Pancrace, Dordogne, in the region of Aquitaine
- Saint-Pancrace, Savoie, in the region of Rhône-Alpes

== See also ==
- St. Pancras (disambiguation)
