= Giacomo Boni (painter) =

Italian painter (1688–1766)

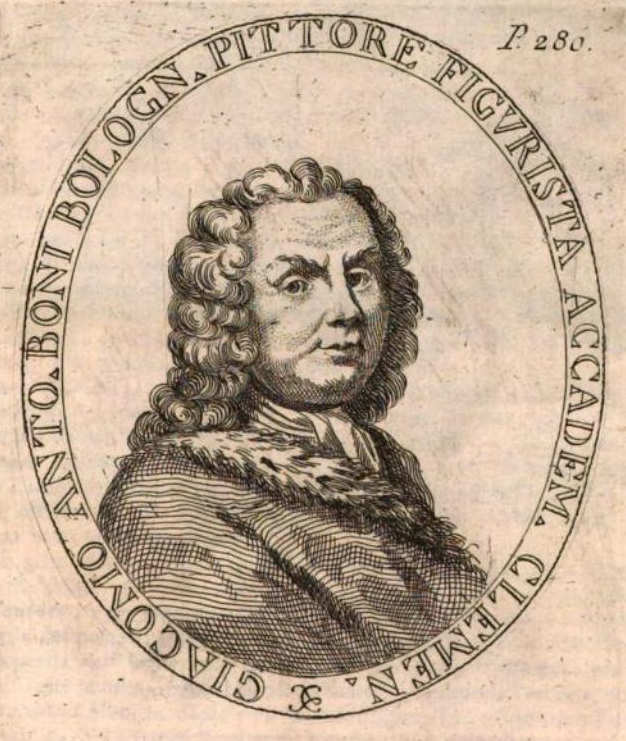
- Portrait by Luigi Crespi
- Born: 28 May 1688; Bologna
- Died: 7 January 1766 (aged 77)
- Known for: Painting
- Movement: Baroque

Giacomo Boni (28 April 1688 – 7 January 1766) was an Italian painter of the late-Baroque period, active mainly in Genoa.

== Biography ==
=== Early life and education ===
Giacomo Boni was born in Bologna on 28 April 1688. He was trained in the artistic climate of Emilia, as an apprentice to Marcantonio Franceschini and Donato Creti in Bologna and Carlo Cignani in Forlì. After visiting Genoa, Boni was influenced by the painting there, especially that of Lorenzo De Ferrari, which contributed to a greater solidity and compositional equilibrium in his own work. In Bologna he belonged to the Accademia Clementina (1720), of which he was appointed director in 1721 and 1723.

=== Career ===
Boni was active, both as a painter of pictures for churches and as a decorator. His vast production in Genoa includes the Agony in the Garden and the Deposition in Santa Maria Maddalena; the fresco Zephyr and Flora (Palazzo Bali-Durazzo, now Palazzo Reale), painted in collaboration with the quadraturista Tommaso Aldrovandini, which, with its Rococo delicacy, is considered to be one of the painter’s best works; and frescoes in aristocratic homes, such as the Nurture of Jupiter in the Palazzo Podestà. He painted the choir of San Pancrazio for the noble family of the Pallavicini. He also painted in the Palazzo Mari and in many others; and frescoed the vault of the oratory of Santa Maria della Costa, at Sanremo.

Boni also painted numerous works outside Genoa: in Rome, the cupola of the Sacrament in St. Peter's Basilica (1712), in collaboration with Franceschini; in Bologna, the decoration of the church of the Celestini (with Giacinto Garofalini and Luca Antonio Bistega); in Piacenza, the decoration of Santa Maria del Popolo (1717); in Parma, the decoration of the choir of San Giovanni Evangelista (1725) – both of the latter works were executed together with Franceschini; and others in Brescia and Milan. In addition he sent works to France and Spain and received commissions from Prince Eugene of Savoy.

Lanzi speaks of Jacopo Boni working as an assistant to Franceschini in decorating the great hall of the Palazzo Pubblico. Among his pupils were Lorenzo Brusco, Giuseppe Comotti, and Giuseppe Rossi.

== Gallery ==
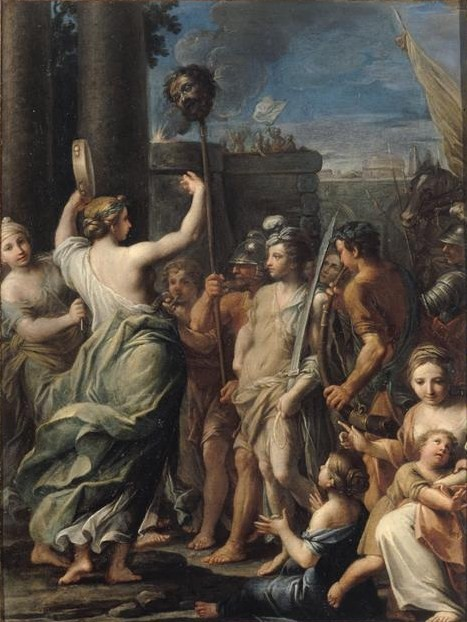
Triumph of David, Musée Fesch, Ajaccio

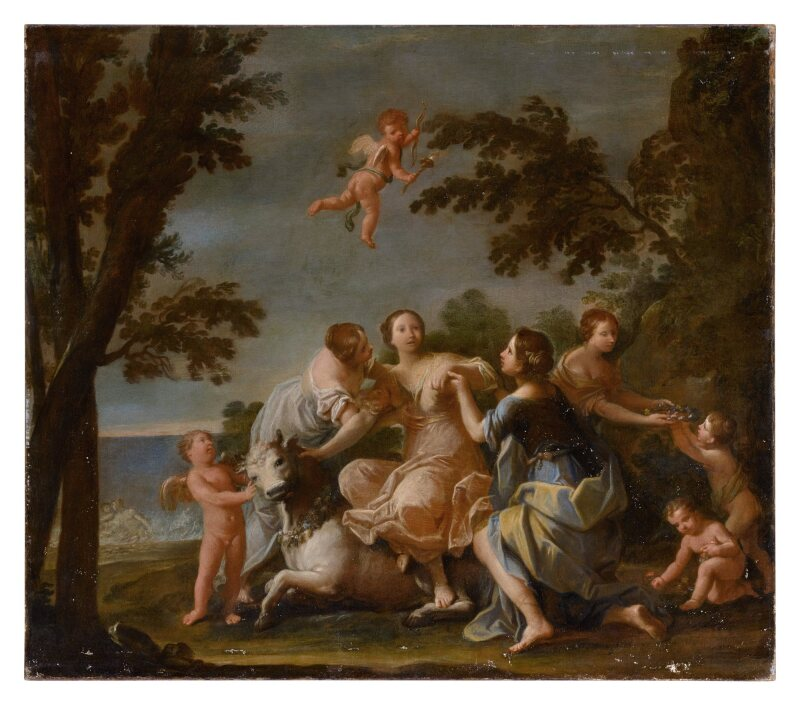
Rape of Europa, private collection

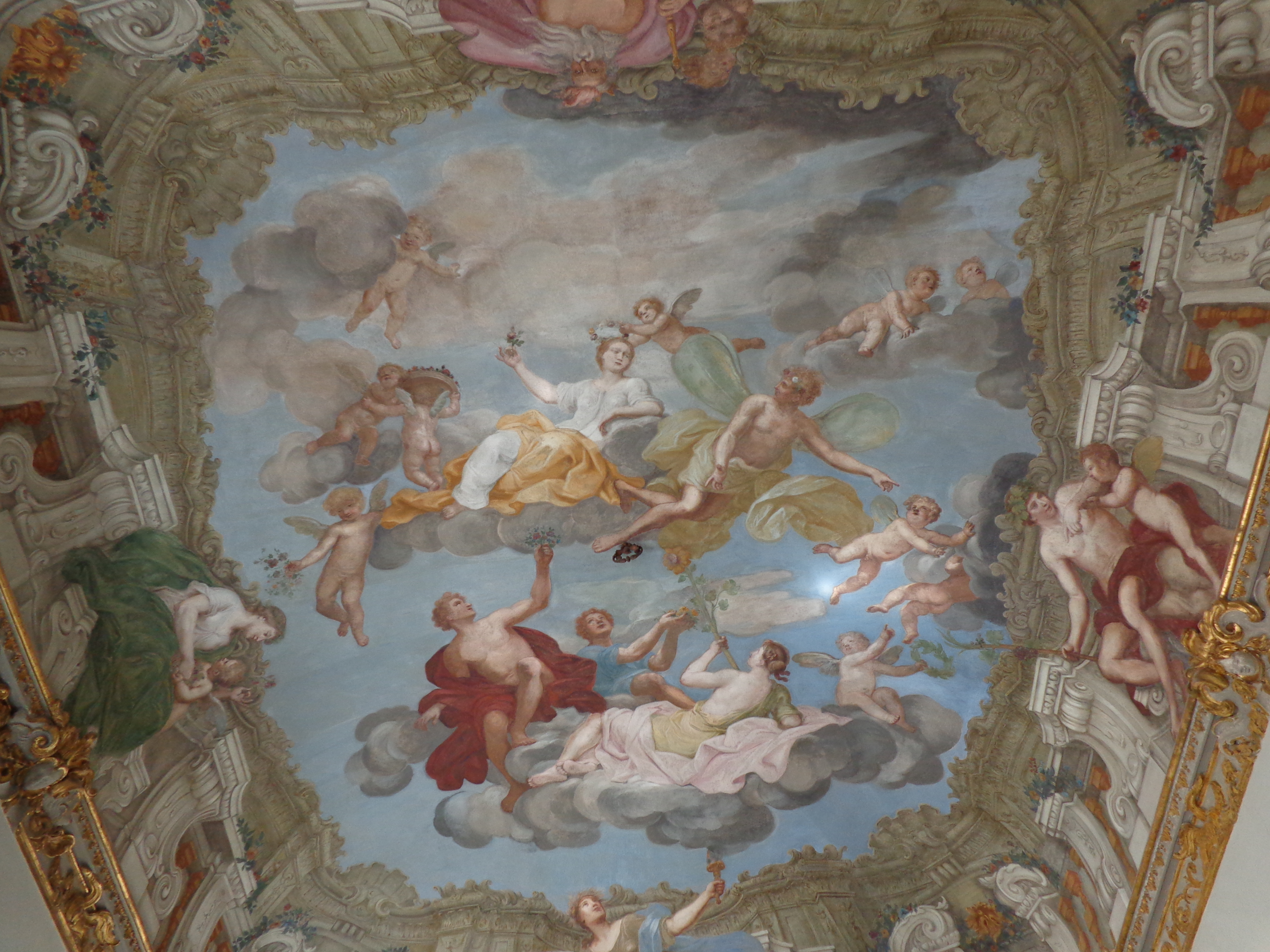
Palazzo Cosma Centurione, loggia

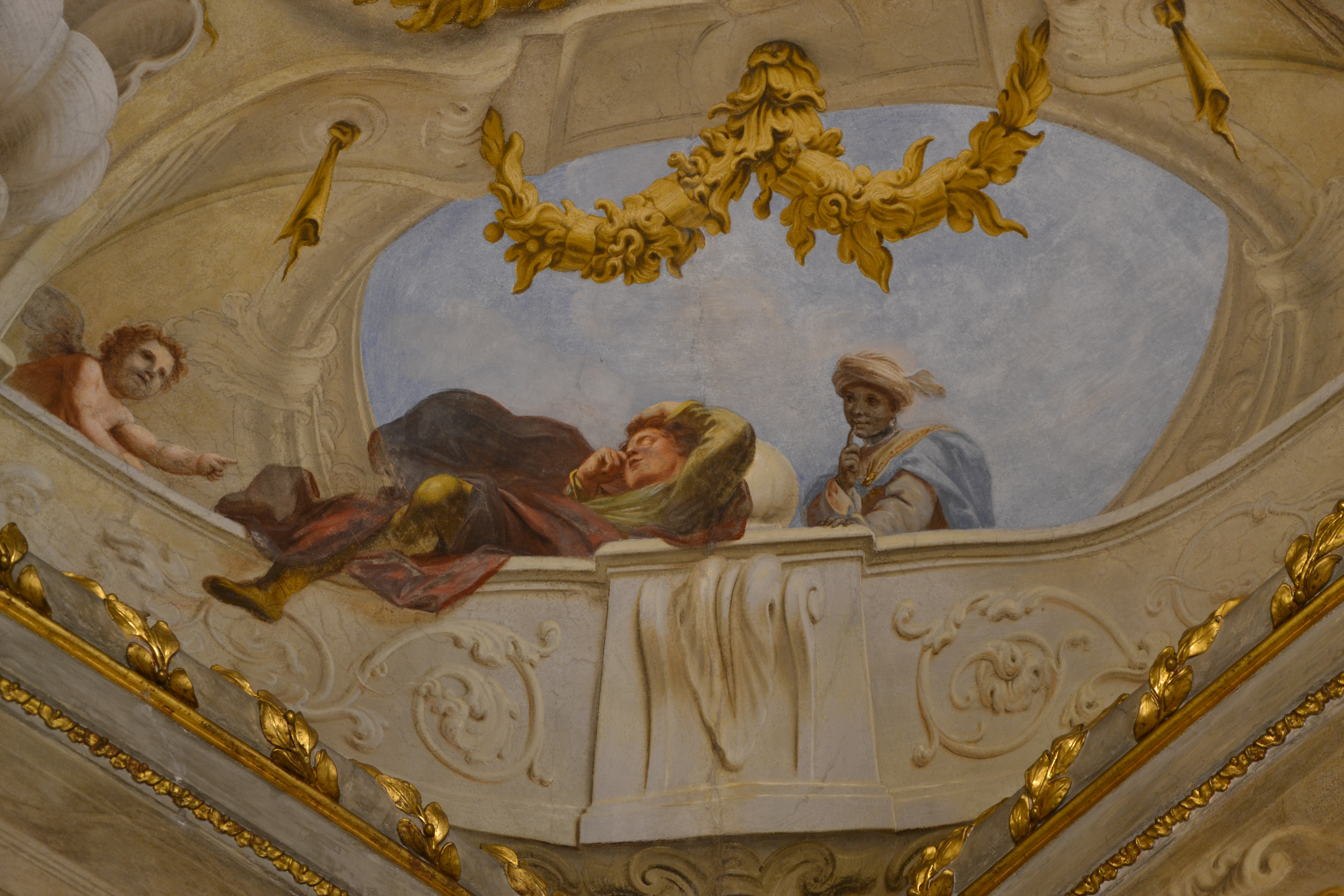
Interior of Palazzo Reale, Genoa (Detail)
