= Tommaso Aldrovandini =

Italian painter (1653–1736)

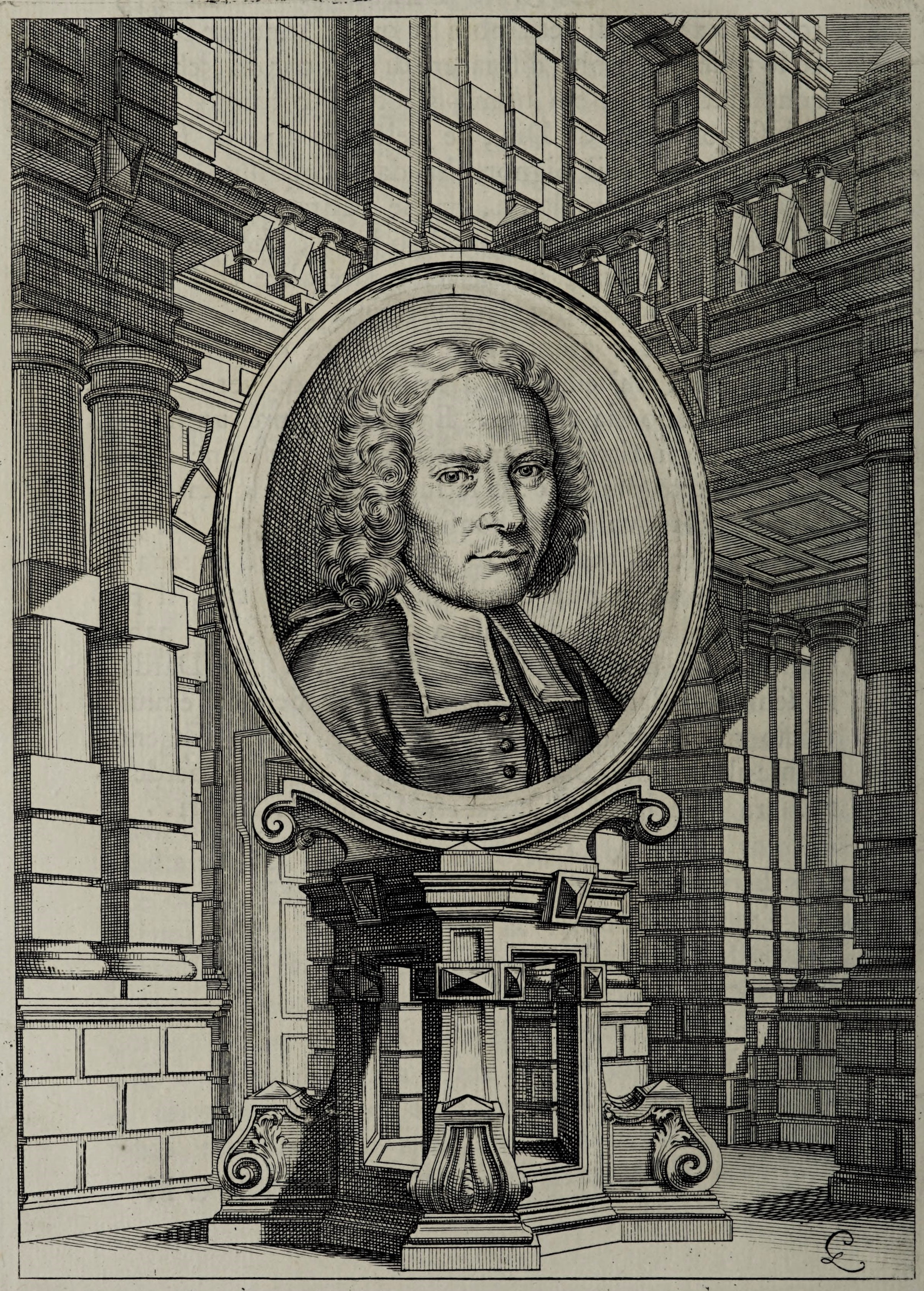
- Portrait of Tommaso Aldrovandini
- Born: 1653; Bologna
- Died: 1736 (aged 82–83)
- Known for: Painting
- Movement: Baroque

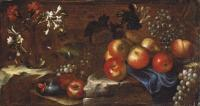
Still life with apples, raisins, and flowers. Oil on canvas, 44.50 x 81.50 cm.

Tommaso Aldrovandini (21 December 1653 – 23 October 1736) was an Italian painter of the Baroque period. He mainly painted perspective views and architectural subjects (quadratura), in which the figures were painted by Marcantonio Franceschini and Carlo Cignani. He decorated churches, palaces, and theaters in Forlì, Verona, Venice, Parma, Turin, Ferrara, and Genoa, and especially in his native Bologna. Among his pupils was Giovanni Benedetto Paolazzi.

== Biography ==
He was born in Bologna on December 21, 1653, son of the painter Giuseppe. He was the main painter among his family and the one who left the greatest number of works.

Introduced to the world of art by his uncle Mauro, he attended the academy of Cesare Gennari and then that of C. Cignani.

After decorating two chapels of the portico of St. Luke, he went to Forlì, where he painted the hall of the Public Palace with his uncle and Cignani. He then worked in Venice and Verona and again in Forlì and Bologna. Here he worked decorating the portico of San Bartolomeo as well as in various palaces, as in that of Marescalchi, where the figures were made by Felice Cignani, Ranuzzi, Zaniboni, Grassi, Fongarini.

He worked a lot in Parma, where he, being still young, executed quadratures in the rooms of Palazzo del Giardino decorated by Carlo Cignani and Marcantonio Franceschini (1681), and he also decorated a chapel in S. Giovanni (1685). He then went to Turin, where he worked in the Scalzi church (1688) and in the Bagnasco house (1689) with Giovanni Antonio Burrini. After that he moved to Ferrara, where he worked with Maurelio Scannavini in the Bevilacqua palace.

In 1692 he was in Bologna to paint the main chapel of the church of the Madonna dei Poveri.

The most important work he executed was in Genoa, where he lived, though with interruptions, almost twenty years. He decorated the rooms of the Great and the Little Council in the Public Palace (destroyed in 1777), the first in 1702 with Franceschini, the other in 1704 with the Genoese Domenico Parodi. During his stay in Genoa he also decorated other rooms in the House of Spinola (with Andrea Carlone), Villa Saluzzo ( with Palmieri), Villa Gentile, Villa Lomellini, and Villa Durazzo Pallavicini. He worked in several churches as well.

He then painted with Giacomo Boni, a pupil of M. A. Franceschini, two chapels of the church of the Benedictine monks of Parma, until he finally returned to Bologna in 1725. He died in Bologna on the 23rd of October 1736 and was buried in the church of S. Mamolo.
