= The Great Thunderstorm =

1638 weather event in Dartmoor, England

Coordinates: 50.577°N 3.811°W

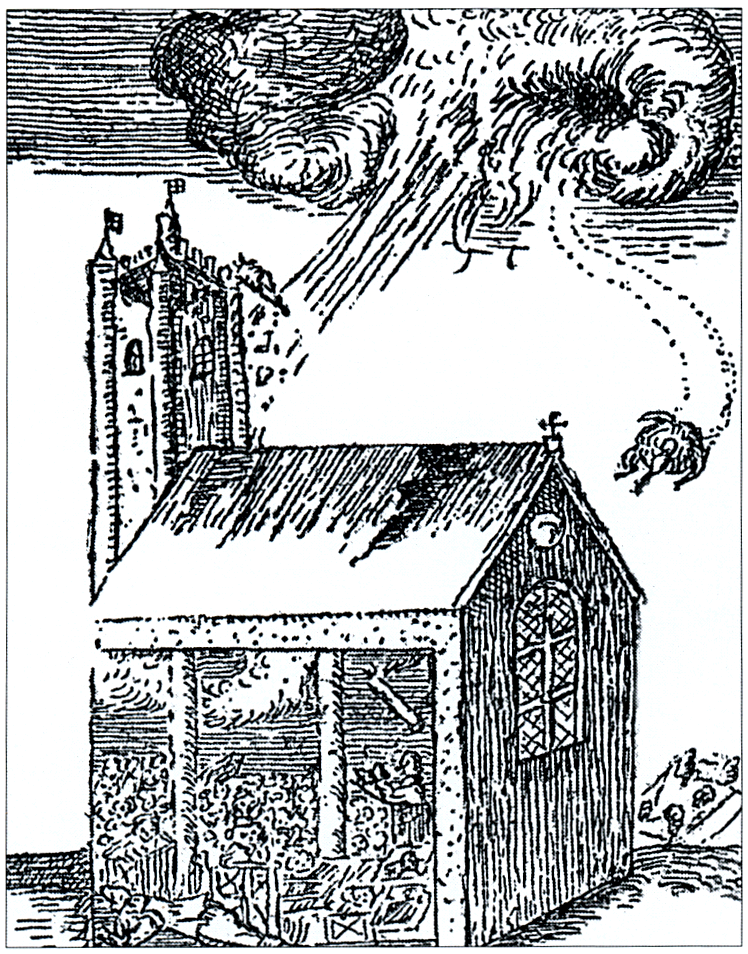
A contemporary woodcut of the storm

The Great Thunderstorm of Widecombe-in-the-Moor in Dartmoor, England took place on Sunday, 21 October 1638 (O.S.), when the church of St Pancras was allegedly struck by ball lightning during a severe thunderstorm. An afternoon service was taking place at the time, and the building was packed with approximately 300 worshippers. Four of them were killed, around 60 injured, and the building severely damaged.

== Eyewitness accounts ==
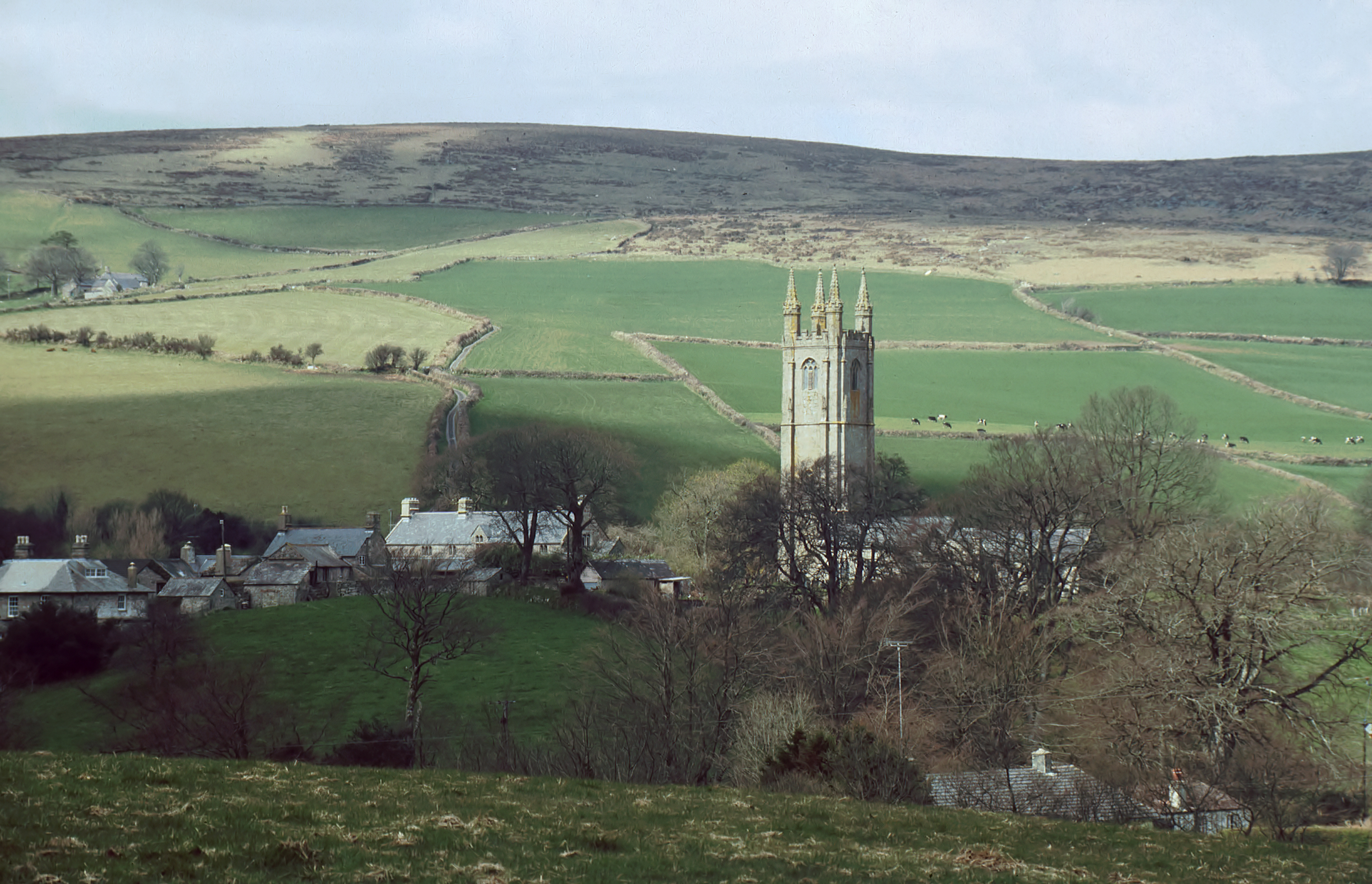
The tower of Widecombe church, 1983

Written accounts by eyewitnesses, apparently published within months of the catastrophe, tell of a strange darkness, powerful thunder, and "a great ball of fire" ripping through a window and tearing part of the roof open. It is said to have rebounded through the church, killing some members of the congregation and burning many others. This is considered by some to be one of the earliest recorded instances of ball lightning.

The Anglican minister, George Lyde, was unhurt, but his wife "had her ruff and the linen next her body, and her body, burnt in a very pitiful manner". The head of local warrener Robert Mead struck a pillar so hard that it left an indentation; his skull was shattered, and his brain hurled to the ground. A "one Master Hill a Gentleman of good account in the Parish" was thrown violently against a wall and died "that night". His son, sitting next to him, was unhurt.

Some are said to have suffered burns to their bodies, but not their clothes. A dog is reported to have run out of the door, been hurled around as if by a small tornado, and fallen dead to the ground.

The village schoolmaster of the time, a gentleman called Roger Hill, and brother of the deceased "Master Hill", recorded the incident in a rhyming testament which is still displayed on boards (originals replaced in 1786) in the church.

== The legend ==
According to local legend, the thunderstorm was the result of a visit by the devil who had made a pact with a local card player and gambler called Jan Reynolds (or Bobby Read, according to the tale recorded at the Tavistock Inn, Poundsgate). The deal was that if the devil ever found him asleep in church, he could have his soul. Jan was said to have fallen asleep during the service that day, with his pack of cards in his hand. Another version of the legend states that the Devil arrived to collect the souls of four people playing cards during the church service.

The devil supposedly headed for Widecombe via the Tavistock Inn, in nearby Poundsgate, where he stopped for directions and refreshment. The landlady reported a visit by a man in black with cloven feet riding a jet black horse. The stranger ordered a mug of ale, and it hissed as it went down his throat. He finished his drink, put the mug down on the bar where it left a scorch mark, and left some money. After the stranger had ridden away, the landlady found that the coins had turned to dried leaves.

The devil tethered his horse to one of the pinnacles at Widecombe Church, captured the sleeping Jan Reynolds, and rode away into the storm. As they flew over nearby Birch Tor, the four aces from Jan's pack of cards fell to the ground, and today, if you stand at Warren House Inn, you can still see four ancient field enclosures, each shaped like the symbols from a pack of cards.

== See also ==
- List of natural disasters in the United Kingdom
