= Giovanni Benedetto Paolazzi =

Italian painter

Giovanni Benedetto Paolazzi (1700–1788) was an Italian painter of the late-Baroque period, active in Bologna, mainly in ornamental and quadratura painting.

== Biography ==
He trained initially under Antonio Dardani, and learned quadratura from Tommaso Aldrovandini. He was a member of the Accademia Clementina and died in Bologna. Paolazzi help decorate some of the rooms in the Palazzo Malvezzi Campeggi.
