= St. Pankraz (Upper Austria) =

- Municipality
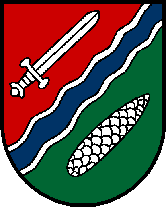
- Coat of arms

- Location within Austria
- Coordinates: 47°45′54″N 14°12′34″E
- Country: Austria
- State: Upper Austria
- District: Kirchdorf

Government
  - Mayor: Manfred Degelsegger (SPÖ)

Area
  - Total: 47.14 km^{2} (18.20 sq mi)
- Elevation: 531 m (1,742 ft)

Population (2018-01-01)
  - Total: 362
  - Density: 7.68/km^{2} (19.9/sq mi)
- Time zone: UTC+1 (CET)
  - Summer (DST): UTC+2 (CEST)
- Postal code: 4572
- Area code: +43 7565
- Vehicle registration: KI
- Website: www.st-pankraz.at

St. Pankraz ( English: St. Pancras) is a municipality in the district of Kirchdorf in the Austrian state of Upper Austria.

== Geography ==
St. Pankraz lies in the Traunviertel. About 70 percent of the municipality is forest, and 9 percent is farmland.
