= Pancras of Taormina =

Italian saint

Saint Pancras of Taormina
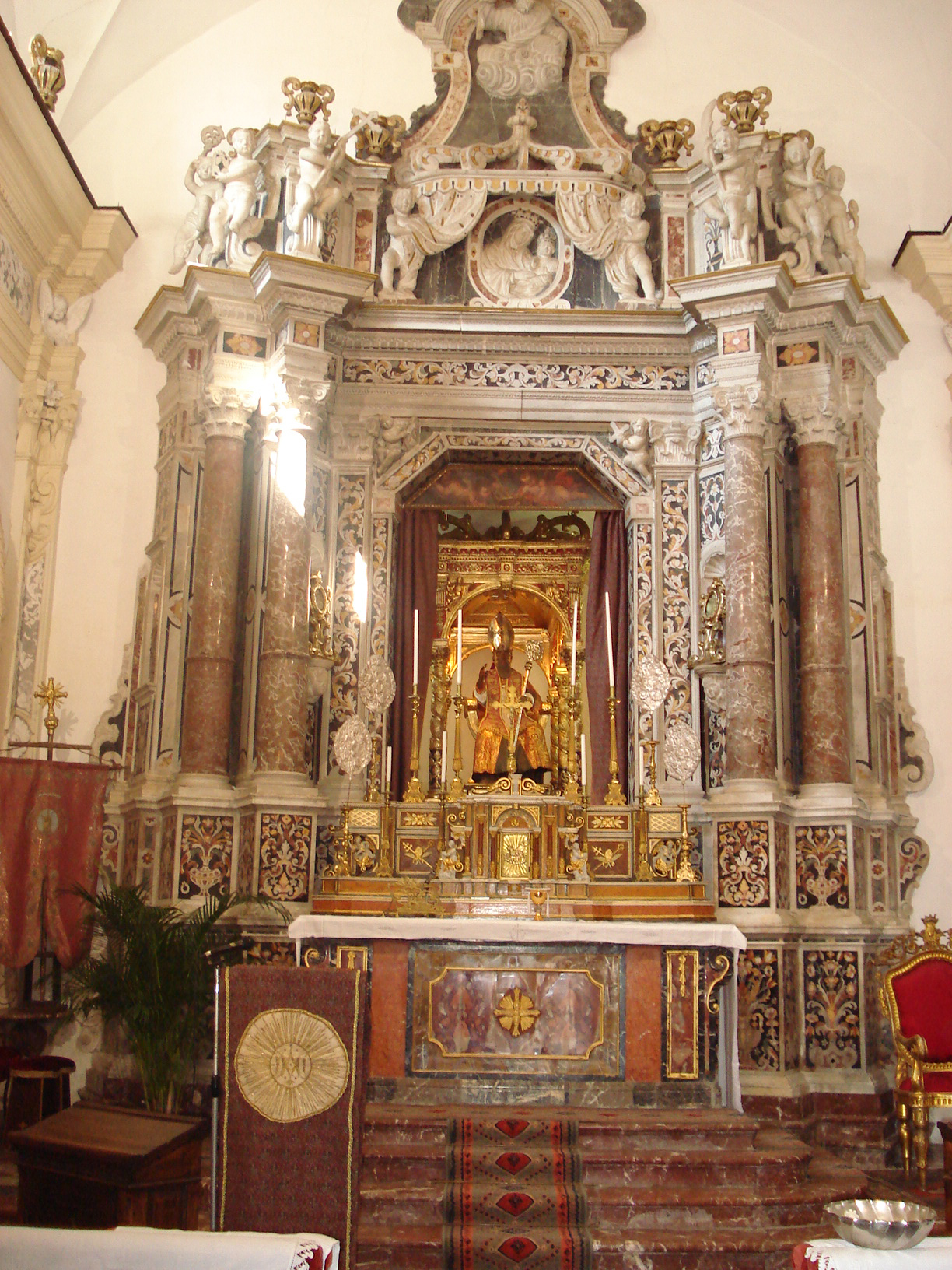
- Church of San Pancrazio, Taormina. The altar, which contains a statue of Saint Pancras.
- Born: Antiochia in Cilicia (modern-day Adana, Turkey)
- Died: c. 40 AD; Taormina (modern-day Italy)
- Venerated in: Roman Catholic Church; Eastern Orthodox Church; Armenian Apostolic Church; True Orthodox Church including Tikhonites
- Feast: 8 July or 9 July (formerly 3 April); the Eastern Orthodox Church venerates him as a Hieromartyr on 9 July (22 July, N.S.).; the Armenian Apostolic Church commemorates him on the Thursday after the first Sunday of Advent.
- Attributes: depicted as an old man with yellowing grey hair, vested as a bishop, holding a cross in his right hand, and a Gospel book in his left
- Patronage: Taormina; Canicattì

Pancras or Pancratius (Greek: Παγκράτιος, Pankratios; Italian: Pancrazio) is an Italian saint associated with Taormina and venerated as a Christian martyr. His surviving hagiography is purely legendary. He is, however, recorded in some early martyrologies.

== Evidence ==
Pancras is commemorated on 8 July and 3 April in the Martyrologium Hieronymianum (5th century). He is also listed for 8 July in the Neapolitan marble calendar (9th century, but dependent on lost early material). In 591, a church in Messina was dedicated to Saints Stephen, Pankratios and Euplus, which probably refers to Pancras of Taormina and Euplius of Catania.

== Legend ==
According to the legendary Life of Saint Pankratios of Taormina, he was born in Antioch in Cilicia (the modern Adana). He travelled to Jerusalem with his parents during the earthly ministry of Jesus; later the entire family was baptized in Antioch. Pancras withdrew to a cave in Pontus where he was discovered by Saint Peter and was sent to Sicily in the year 40 to be the first Bishop of Tauromenium (the modern Taormina). There he met his death by stoning at the hands of pagan opponents of the new religion.

According to the vita of Pankratios (Mayxparcos), written by a Evagrios, apostle Peter reposummoned some painter Joseph, and ordered him to make icons of Christ, Peter, and Pankratios. Later Pankratios used these icons in his mission.

== Veneration ==
He is venerated as a saint in the Roman Catholic Church and in the Eastern Orthodox Church as a Hieromartyr.

In the Catholic Church his cult is concentrated on the island of Sicily, where the veneration of saints from the eastern Mediterranean was particularly encouraged during the period of Byzantine rule. He is the patron saint of Taormina and Canicattì. His feast day was entered into the Roman Martyrology as 3 April; later this was amended to 8 July. More often he is celebrated on 9 July, the traditional day of his martyrdom. The largest portion of his relics are preserved at Rome.

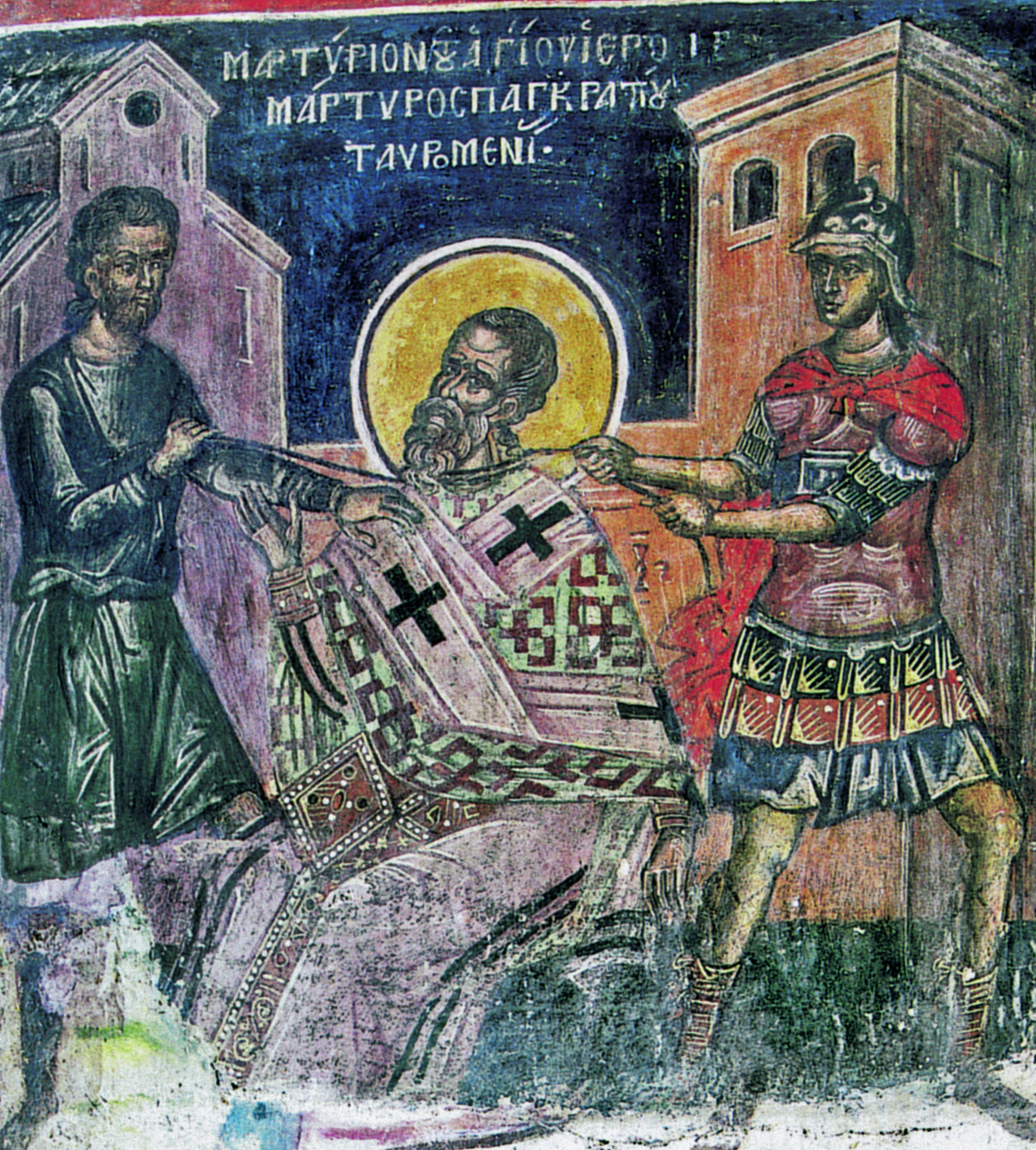
Martyrdom of Saint Pankratios from the Dionysiou Monastery (1547)

The Eastern Orthodox Church venerates him on 9 July (22 July, N.S.). He is also, together with martyrs Marcellus and Philagrus, commemorated on 9 February. The Greek calendar also commemorates, on 7 June, the holy women Aesia and Susanna, disciples of Pancras and martyred with him. A portion of his relics are kept on Mount Athos.

The Armenian Apostolic Church venerates him on the Thursday following the first Sunday of Advent. He is known in Armenian as Bagarat (Բագարատ). The Armenian synaxarion (Յայսմաւուրք) gives an extensive account of Pancras' acts, including his evangelization of all the cities and villages of Sicily.

Saint Pancras of Taormina should not be confused with Saint Pancras of Rome, a young man who was martyred by being beheaded around the year 304.

== Depiction in art ==
In iconography, St Pancras is depicted as an old man with grey hair, vested as a bishop, holding a cross in his right hand, and a Gospel book in his left. The cross commemorates a miracle attributed to St Pancras whereby he saved the city of Taormina from destruction by the pagan commander Aquilinus. The Gospel represents his preaching of the Christian faith.

== See also ==
- History of Taormina
- Pancras of Rome: most of the churches bearing this name are not connected to the Taormina Pancras
