= St Pancras Church, Exeter =

Church in Devon, England

Coordinates: 50.7238°N 3.5326°W

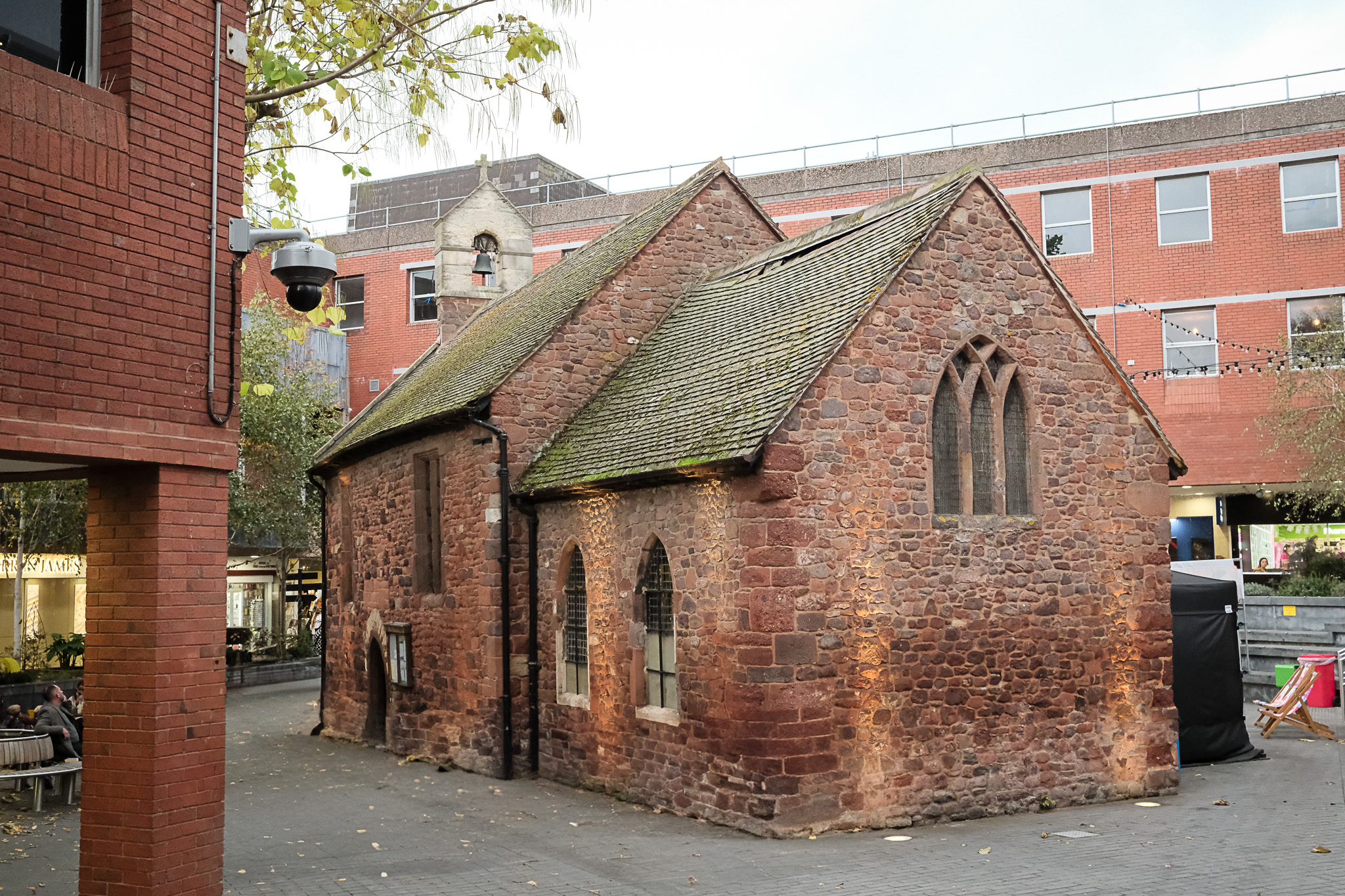
The Church of St Pancras, Exeter

St Pancras Church is a small church situated in the middle of the Guildhall Shopping Centre in Exeter. The majority of the church dates from the thirteenth century, although the font is eleventh century. The church probably occupies the oldest Christian site in Exeter, and is usually open on weekdays. The church is designated by English Heritage as a Grade II* listed building.

== History ==
It is not known when St Pancras' Church was constructed though the dedication to Saint Pancras indicated that it may have been of Anglo-Saxon origin. Records cited a Saxon-style archway in the construction which was later removed during renovations. The church was first mentioned in 1191 but most of the building work dates to the 13th century. The church underwent several periods of use and disuse between 1658 and 1831. In 1831, the chancel arch was destroyed and replaced with a plain one which stood until John Loughborough Pearson renovated the church to rebuild the original arch. Pews were also added to the church. In 1906, when the nearby All Hallows Church was demolished for road widening, St Pancras received its Jacobean pulpit and medieval memorial tablets. In the early 20th century, the Bishop of Exeter considered closing St Pancras and uniting it with another parish but due to the church hosting worshipers from churches that had been bombed during the Second World War, the church remained open with the Victorian pews later removed. A house that had been built up against the church and blocked out a window in the 1930s was removed during 1969 due to a shopping centre being built around the sunken church.

The stained glass in the east window is by Percy Bacon & Brothers. Installed in 1895, it depicts Pancras of Rome, The Crucifixion of Jesus, and St. Boniface.

In 1953, English Heritage granted the church grade II* listed building status. The reason for the grant was because St Pancras was a good example of a small medieval urban church that managed to maintain a lot of its original medieval fittings and fixtures.

== See also ==
- List of ecclesiastical restorations and alterations by J. L. Pearson
