= Inmaculado Corazón de María (San Pancracio), Montevideo =

Church building in Montevideo, Uruguay

Coordinates: 34°53′28.4″S 56°10′39.2″W

Parroquia del Inmaculado Corazón de María (San Pancracio)
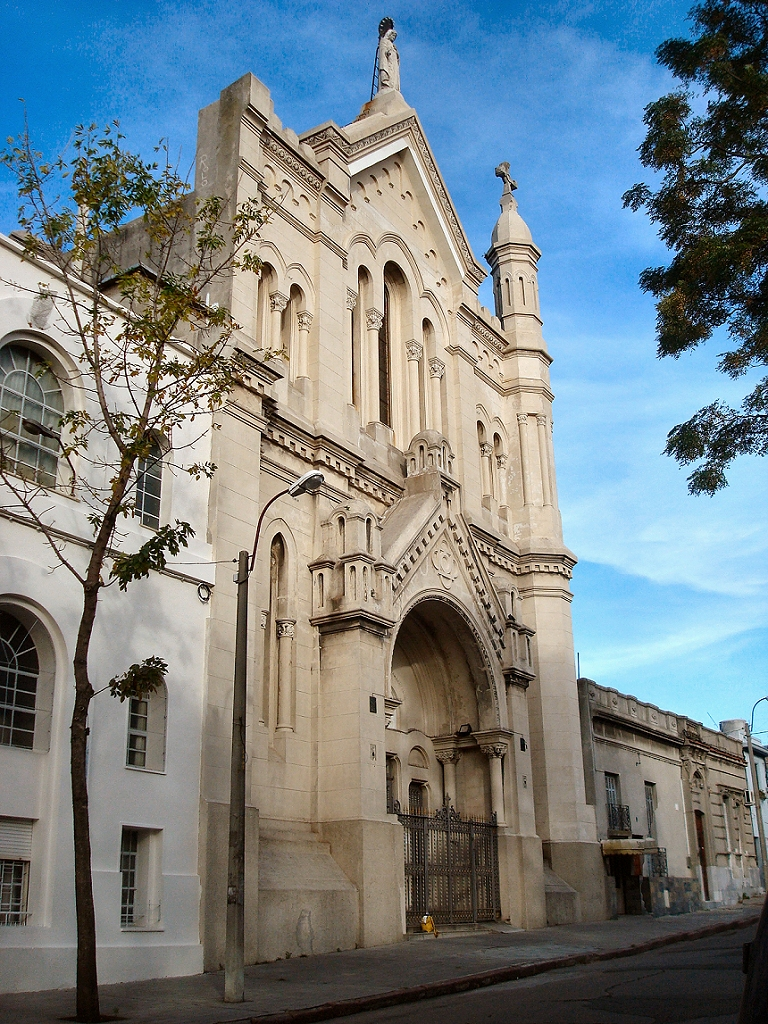

Religion
- Affiliation: Roman Catholic
- Ecclesiastical or organizational status: Parish church

Location
- Location: Inca 2040; Montevideo, Uruguay
- Interactive map of Parroquia del Inmaculado Corazón de María (San Pancracio)

Architecture
- Type: Church

The Church of the Immaculate Heart of Mary (Spanish: Iglesia del Inmaculado Corazón de María), popularly known as San Pancracio (Spanish for "Saint Pancras") is a Roman Catholic parish church in Villa Muñoz, Montevideo, Uruguay.

Held by the Claretians, it is dedicated to the Immaculate Heart of Mary and also to Saint Pancras, patron saint of work and health. For this reason, this church has turned into a pilgrimage destination, with people attending the 12th day, every month of the year.

The parish was established on 30 January 1919.
