= San Pancrazio, Sestino =

9th- or 10th-century church in Tuscany

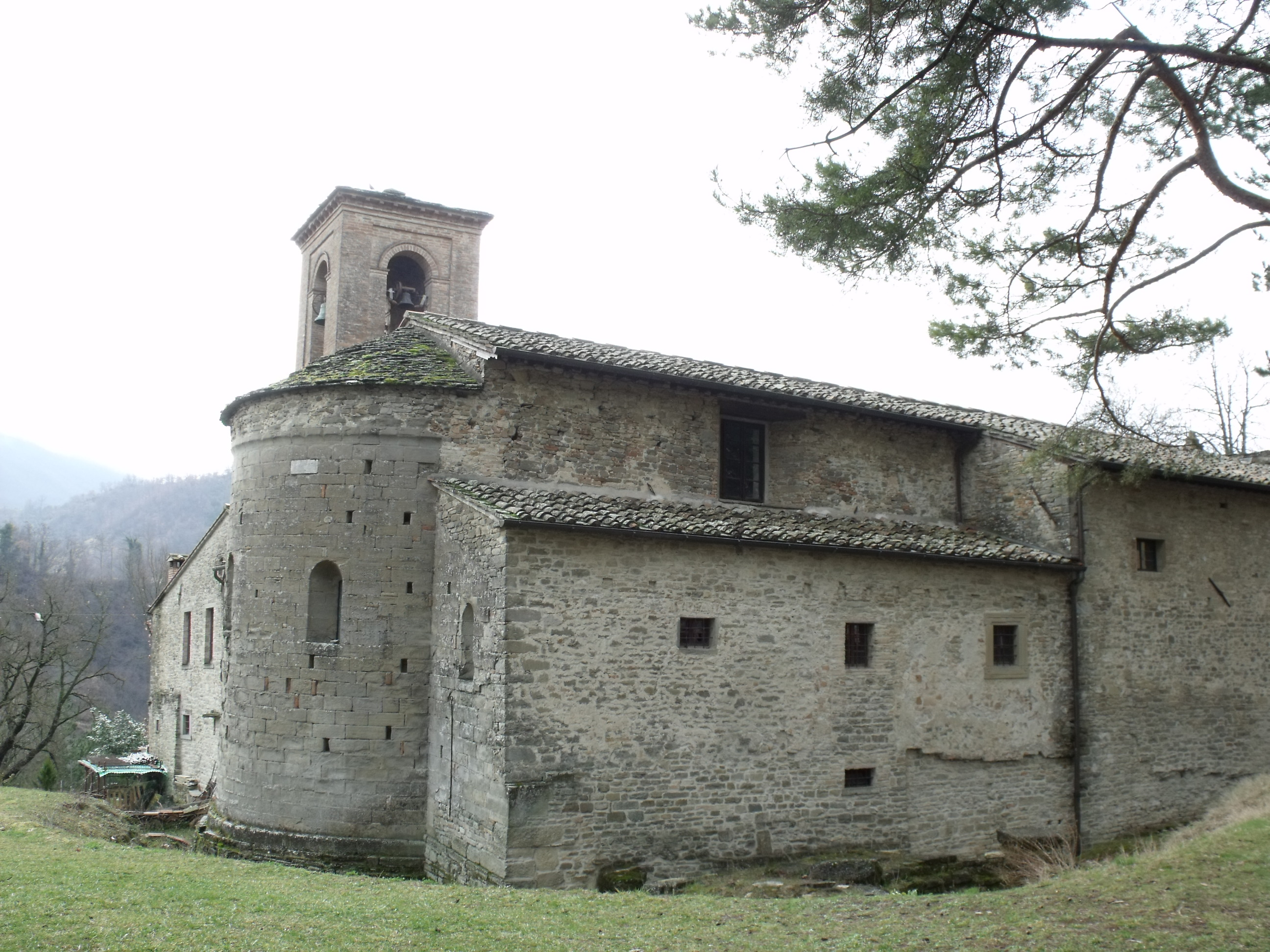
The church of St. Pancras

San Pancrazio ("St. Pancras") is a 9th- or 10th-century church and former pieve in Sestino, Tuscany dedicated to St. Pancras of Rome.

It is built over a Roman Curia Augusta or ancient Roman court building. Of the original medieval edifice the crypt survives, with walls decorated by blind arches and columns and medieval sculptures. The Romanesque apse is from the 12th century, while the façade was remade in the late 17th century and the two aisles were suppressed in 1784. Notable is also the sandstone altar (1259) supported by a Roman cippus (374).

In October 2026, the church was reopened following restoration.
