= St Pancras Church, Kingston near Lewes =

St Pancras Church
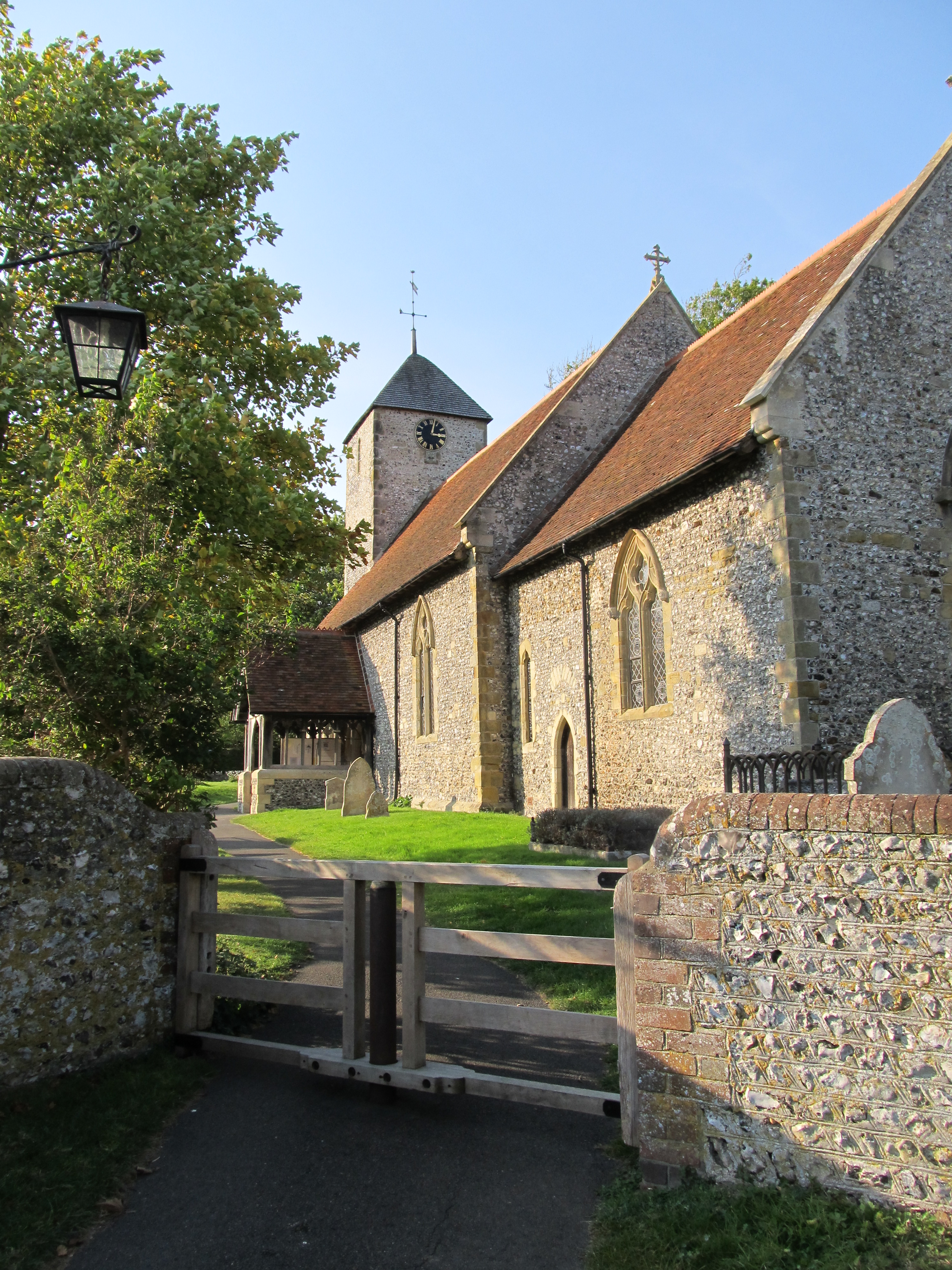
- St Pancras Church
- 50.8563°N 0.0245°W
- Location: The Street, Kingston near Lewes, East Sussex BN7 3PD
- Country: England
- Denomination: Church of England
- Website: https://www.achurchnearyou.com/church/5018/

History
- Status: Parish church
- Dedication: Pancras of Rome
- Dedicated: 13th century

Architecture
- Functional status: Active
- Heritage designation: Grade II*
- Style: Decorated Gothic

Administration
- Province: Canterbury
- Diocese: Chichester
- Archdeaconry: Lewes and Hastings
- Deanery: Lewes and Seaford
- Parish: Kingston, St Pancras

Clergy
- Pastor: Reverend Joe Chipper

St Pancras Church is the parish church of Kingston near Lewes in East Sussex, England. The church building was built in the 13th century and is protected as a Grade II* listed building.

== Overview ==
The church building was built in the 13th century. It is made of stone and flint rubble. It comprises a nave, chancel, western tower, and south porch. The building was damaged by lightning in 1865, and again in 1874. It was designated Grade II* listed on 20 August 1965.

Inside the church, the communion table is Elizabethan and the chest at the west end of the nave is Jacobean. There are three ancient bells in the tower, one of them made by Walter Wimbis. There are also a chalice and paten dating back to 1568; a chalice, paten, and flagon of silver, to 1872–1874; and a silver alms-dish, to circa 1700. The church also contains a memorial window to anti-apartheid activist and clergyman Michael Scott.

The parish is part of the United Benefice of Iford, Rodmell, Southease and Piddinghoe. The registers began in 1654.

== See also ==
- List of places of worship in Lewes (district)

== Bibliography ==
- A Guide to the Parish Church of Saint Pancras, Kingston near Lewes, Sussex (Claras, 1988).
