= San Pancrazio, Genoa =

Coordinates: 44°24′40.96″N 8°55′45.22″E

San Pancrazio
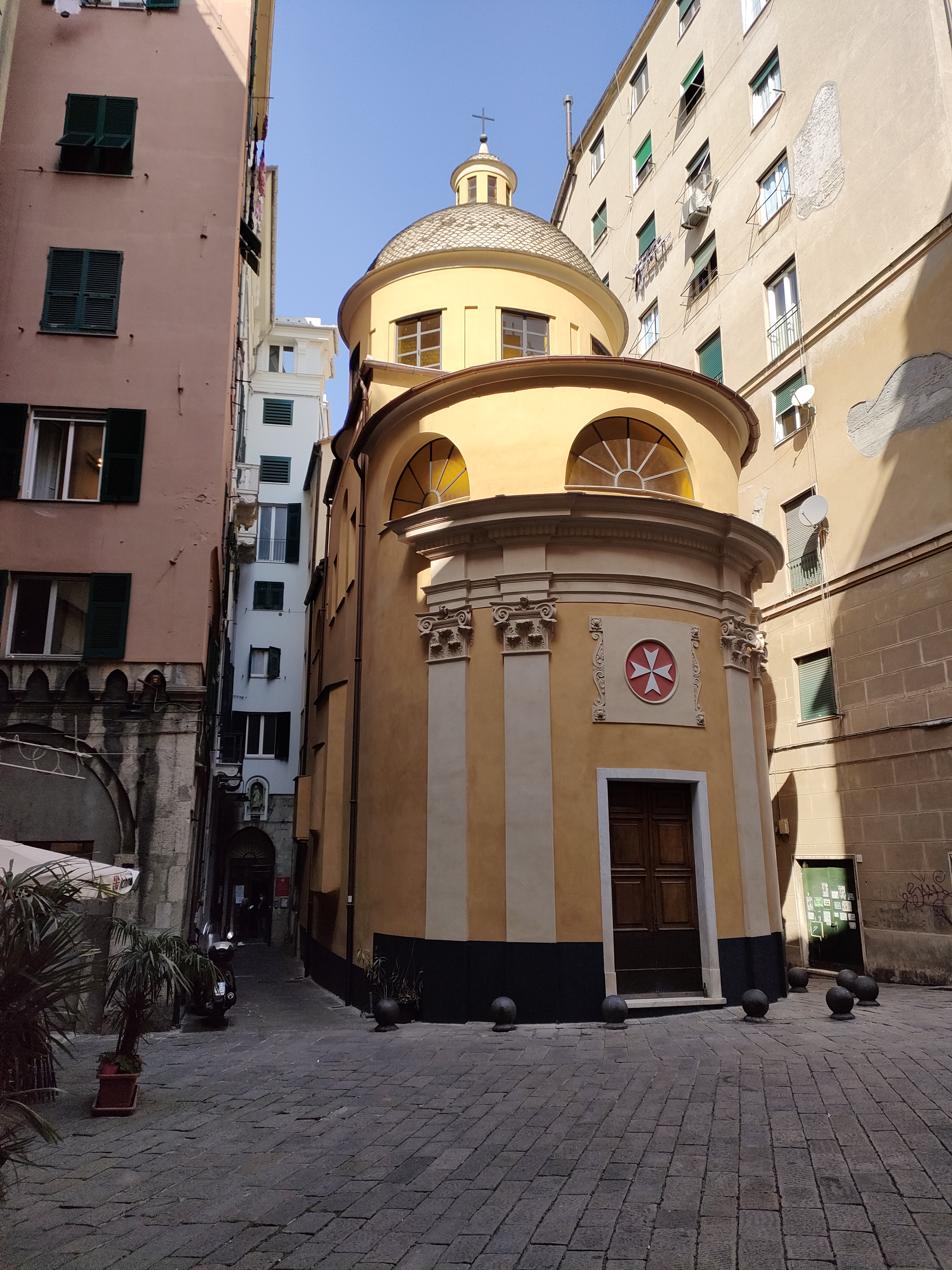
- Façade
- San Pancrazio
- Location: Genoa, Italy
- Denomination: Roman Catholic

History
- Dedication: Pancras of Rome

Architecture
- Style: Baroque

Administration
- Province: Genoa

The church of San Pancrazio is found in central Genoa, in front of the piazza named after the same saint. A church at the site was first linked to the nearby Benedictine Abbey of San Siro in the 11th century. A document from the 16th century notes that the church had been for centuries endowed by prominent Genoese families including the Calvi and Pallavicini. The present layout dates into the 18th century. In 1684, the church was demolished by the bombardment of Genoa by the naval forces of Louis XIV of France. The architect Antonio Maria Ricca designed the present structure. The church was again damaged by aerial bombing during the Second World War. It is now attached to the Sovereign Military Order of Malta as evidenced by the cross above the portal.

The apse frescoes were completed by Giacomo Antonio Boni, while the triptych of the Life of St. Pancras, attributed to Adriaen Isenbrandt, has been reconstructed within a decorative marble main altar.

== Sources ==
- Official site from the Diocese of Genoa
- Pareto, Lorenzo; Camillo Pallavicino; Massimiliano Spinola; Giovanni Cristoforo Gandolfi (1846). Descrizione di Genova e del Genovesato, Volumen III. Tipografia Ferrando. p. 115.
