= Kingston Escarpment and Iford Hill =

Coordinates: 50.846°N 0.024°W

- Site of Special Scientific Interest
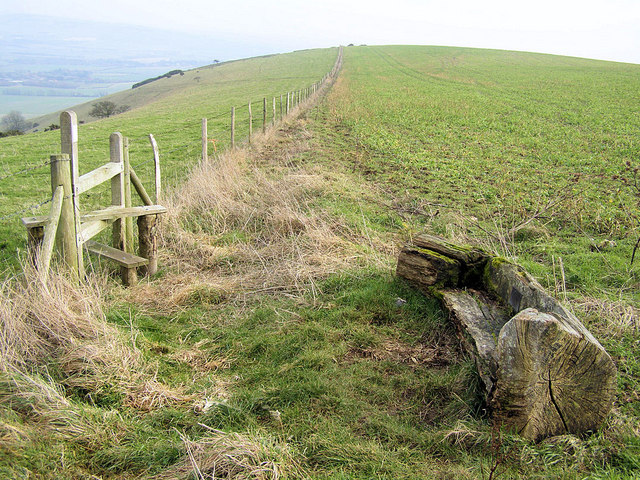
- Location of Kingston Escarpment and Iford Hill.
- Area of search: East Sussex
- Grid reference: TQ 392 070
- Interest: Biological
- Area: 63.4 hectares (157 acres)
- Notification date: 1986
- Location map: Magic Map

Kingston Escarpment and Iford Hill is a 63.4-hectare (157-acre) biological Site of Special Scientific Interest east of Brighton in East Sussex.

These two areas of steeply sloping chalk grassland have a rich invertebrate fauna, including Adonis blue and small blue butterflies and the nationally rare and specially protected wart-biter grasshopper. The flora is also diverse with plants such as squinancywort, horseshoe vetch and eyebright.
