= Church of St Pancras, Widecombe-in-the-Moor =

Church in Devon, England

Coordinates: 50.5768°N 3.8109°W

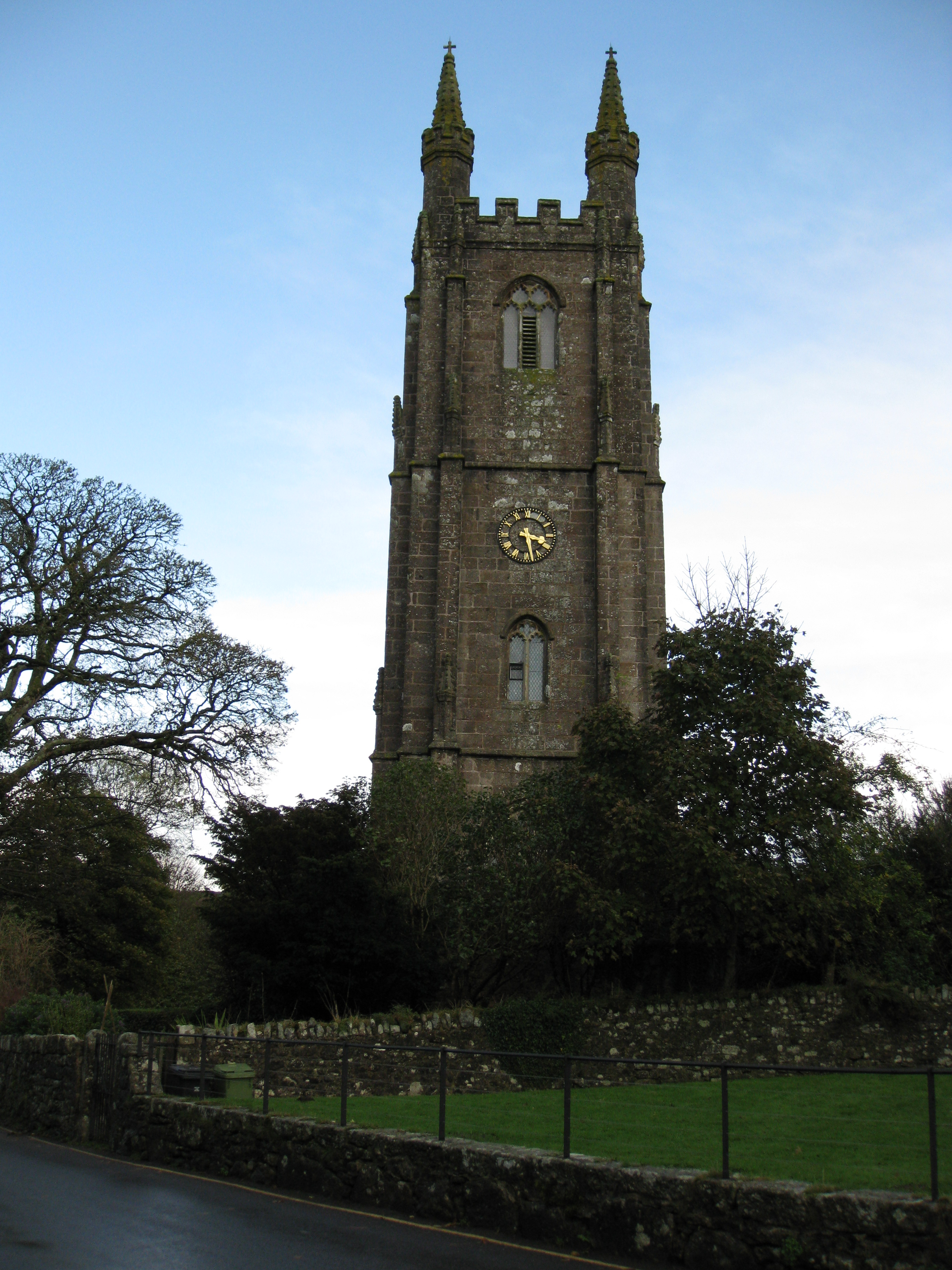
St Pancras Church, Widecombe-in-the-Moor

The Church of Saint Pancras is a Church of England church in Widecombe-in-the-Moor, Devon, England. It is also known as the Cathedral of the Moor. The church is Grade I listed.

It has received the nickname "Cathedral of the Moor" because of its 120-foot tower and relatively large capacity for such a small village. The church was originally built in the fourteenth century, in the Perpendicular (late Gothic) style, using locally quarried granite. It was enlarged over the following two centuries, partly on the proceeds of the local tin-mining trade. Inside, the ceiling is decorated with a large number of decorative roof bosses, including the tinner's emblem of a circle of three hares (known locally as the Tinners' Rabbits).

The church was badly damaged in the Great Thunderstorm of 1638, apparently struck by ball lightning. An afternoon service was taking place at the time, and the building was packed with approximately 300 worshippers. Four of them were killed, around 60 injured. According to local legend, the Great Thunderstorm was caused by the village being visited by the Devil.

The size of the parish meant that, for centuries, families were obliged to walk for miles to go to church at Widecombe every Sunday. The task was even more challenging when it came to burying their dead, whose coffins had to be carried over rough ground and both up and down exceptionally steep hills. Halfway up Dartmeet Hill, for example, lies the Coffin Stone, close to the road, where the body would be placed to allow the bearers to take a rest. The rock is split in two along its length. Local legend has it that the body of a particularly wicked man was laid there. God took exception to this, and struck the stone with a thunderbolt, destroying the coffin and splitting the stone in two.

Beatrice Chase, a writer known during the first half of the 20th century for her Dartmoor-based novels, is buried in the churchyard. The churchyard also contains a Commonwealth war grave of an RAF airman of World War II.
