= Pancras of Rome =

Child martyr of early Christianity

Saint Pancras of Rome
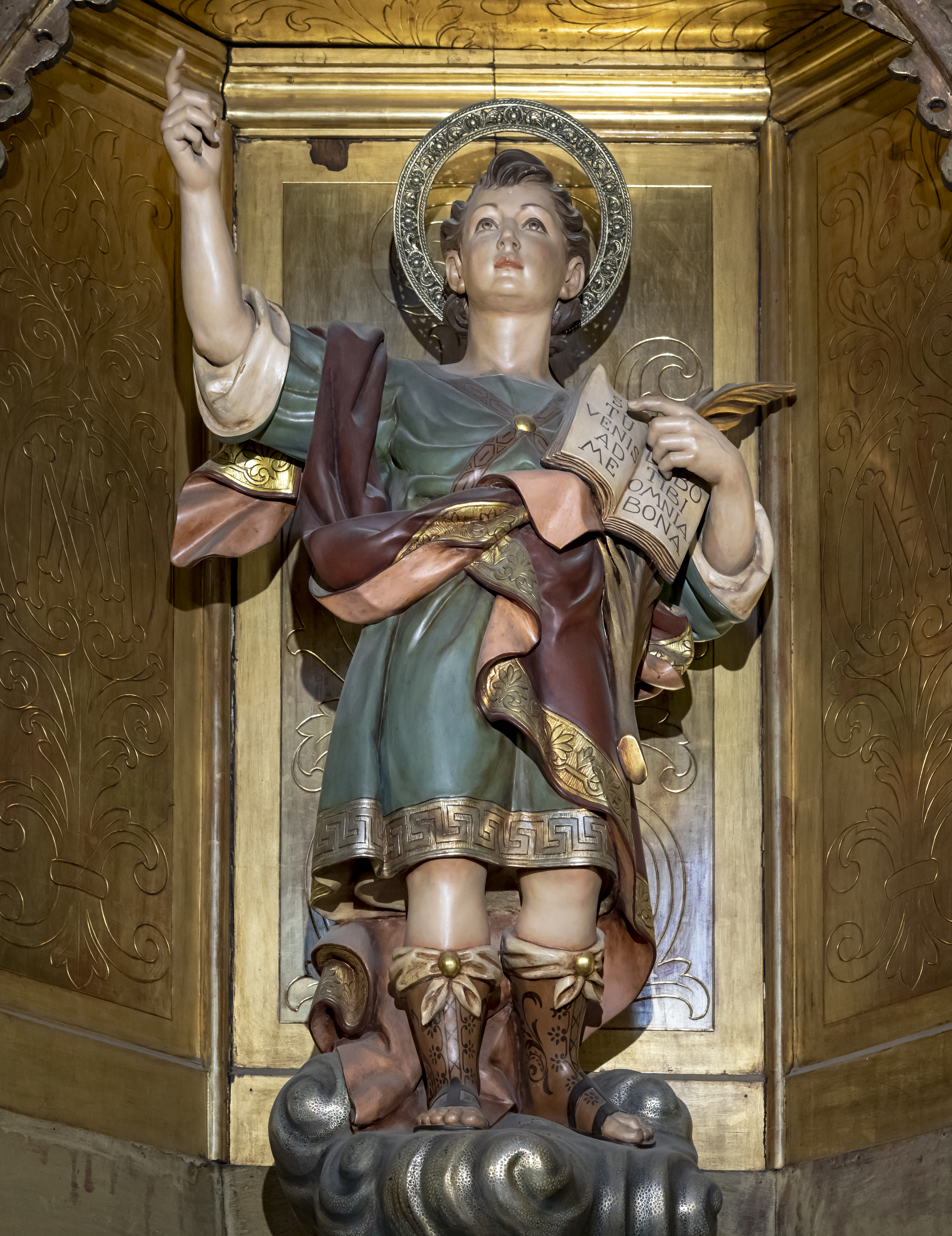
- The Cathedral of the Holy Cross and Saint Eulalia in Barcelona

Martyr
- Born: c. 289; Synnada in Phrygia (modern-day Şuhut, Afyonkarahisar, Turkey)
- Died: 12 May 303 or 304 (aged 14); Rome
- Venerated in: Catholic Church; Eastern Orthodox Church; Anglicanism
- Major shrine: San Pancrazio, Rome, Italy.
- Feast: 12 May
- Attributes: Roman legion armour, martyr's palm branch, book, quill, sword

Saint Pancras (Latin: Sanctus Pancratius) was a Roman citizen who converted to Christianity and was beheaded for his faith at the age of fourteen, around the year 304. His name is Greek (Πανκράτιος, Pankrátios), meaning “all-powerful”. He is venerated as a martyr in both the Eastern Orthodox Church and the Catholic Church.

== Legend ==
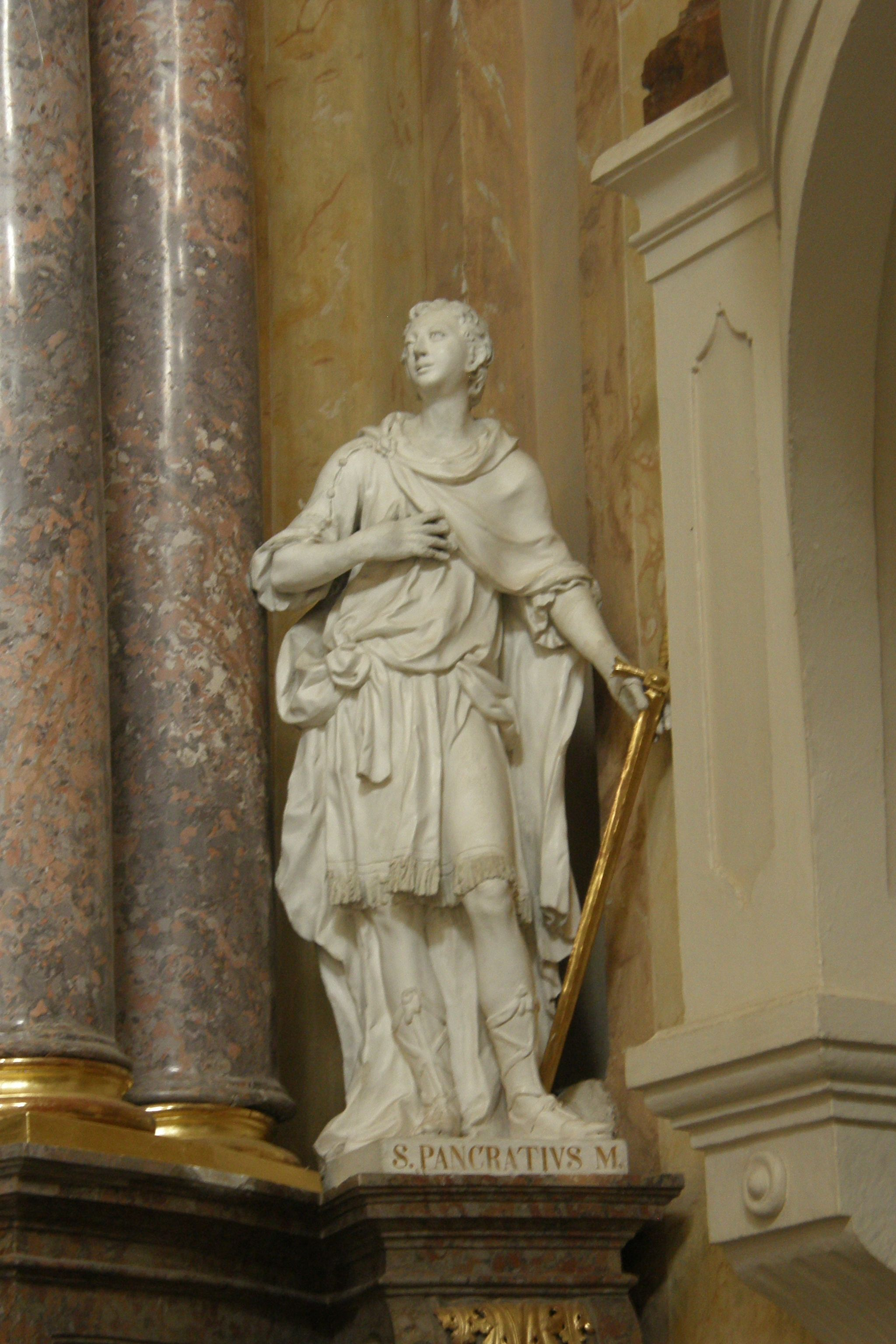
Statue of Pancras in a church at Vranov, Moravia

Because he was said to have been martyred at the age of fourteen during the persecution under Diocletian, Pancras would have been born around 289, at a place designated as near Synnada, a city of Phrygia Salutaris, to parents of Roman citizenship. When Pancras was nine years old, his mother Cyriada died during childbirth; his father died of grief not long after. Pancras was entrusted to his uncle Dionysius' care. They both moved to Rome to live in a villa on the Caelian Hill. They were converted to Christianity by one Marcellinus, and Pancras became a zealous adherent of the religion. Dionysius subsequently died, leaving Pancras on his own.

During the persecution of Christians by Emperor Diocletian, around 303 AD, he was brought before the authorities and asked to perform a sacrifice to the Roman gods. Diocletian, impressed with the boy's determination to resist, promised him wealth and power, but Pancras refused, and finally the emperor ordered him to be beheaded on the Via Aurelia, on 12 May 303 AD. This traditional year of his martyrdom cannot be squared with the saint's defiance of Diocletian in Rome, which the emperor had not visited since 286, nor with the mention of Cornelius (251–253) as Bishop of Rome at the time of the martyrdom, as the most recent monograph on Pancras' texts and cult has pointed out.

A Roman matron named Octavilla recovered Pancras' body, covered it with balsam, wrapped it in precious linens, and buried it in a newly built sepulchre dug in the Catacombs of Rome. Pancras' head was placed in the reliquary that still exists today in the Basilica of Saint Pancras.

== Veneration ==
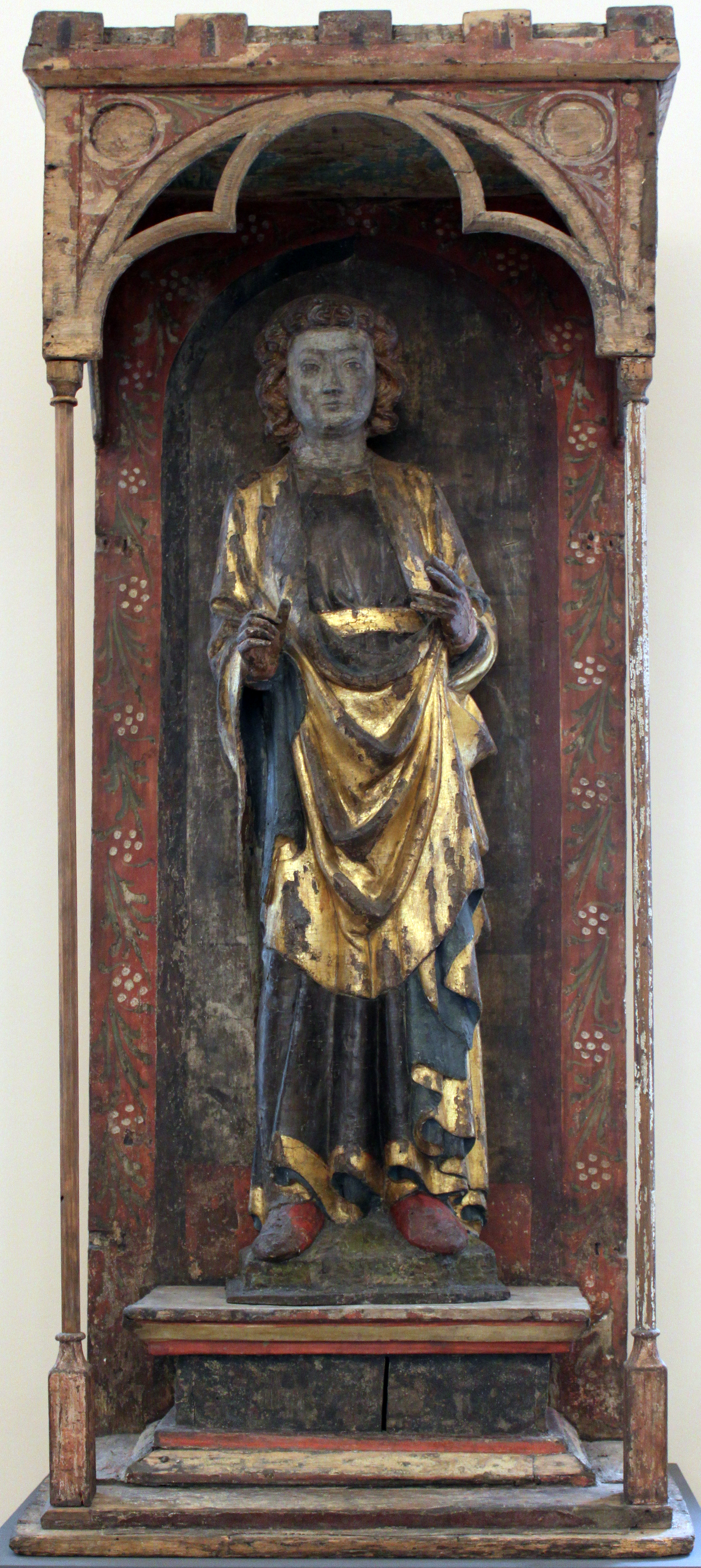
Shrine to St Pancras, made in northern Germany, c. 1300

Devotion to Pancras existed from the fifth century onwards, for the basilica of Saint Pancras was built by Pope Symmachus (498–514), on the place where the body of the young martyr had been buried; his earliest passio seems to have been written during this time. Pope Gregory the Great gave impetus to the cult of Pancras, sending Augustine to England carrying relics of that saint and including his legend in Liber in gloria martyrum (for this reason, many English churches are dedicated to Pancras; St Pancras Old Church in London is one of the oldest sites of Christian worship in England).

In medieval iconography, Pancras was depicted as a young soldier, due to his association with the paired soldier saints Nereus and Achilleus.

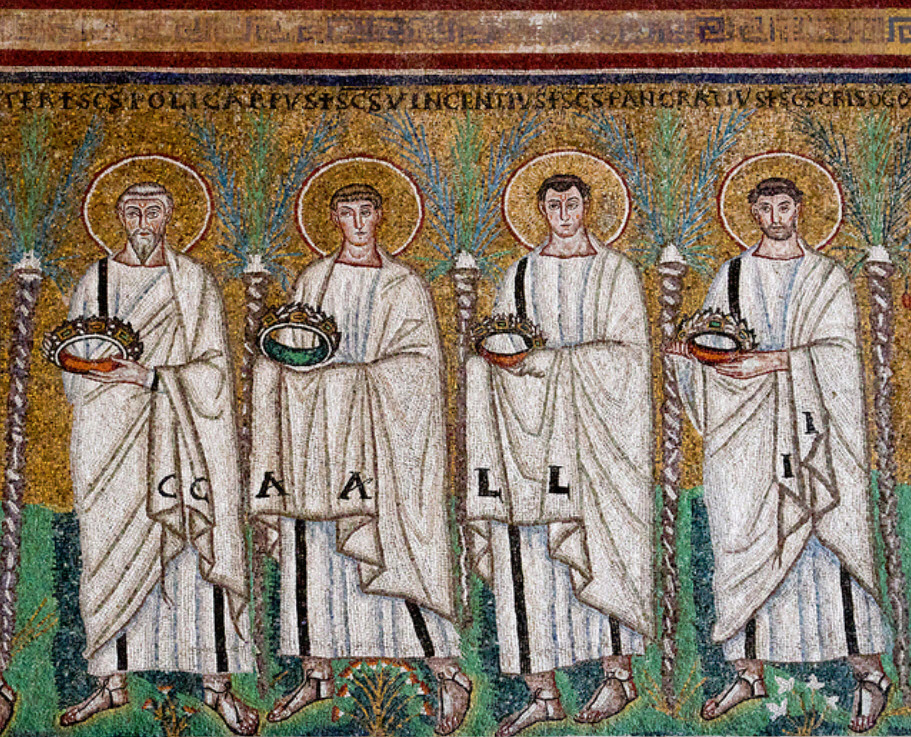
The frescoes of the saints Polycarp, Vincent of Saragossa, Pancras of Rome and Chrysogonus inside the Basilica of Sant'Apollinare Nuovo

Pancras is popularly venerated as the patron saint of children, jobs and health. His name is also invoked against cramps, false witnesses, headaches and perjury. His image in statue form can be found in many bars, restaurants and other businesses. He is also the patron saint of the Italian city San Pancrazio Salentino.

The Tridentine calendar had on 12 May a joint feast (semidouble rank) of Nereus, Achilleus and Pancras. The name of Domitilla was added in 1595. The joint celebration of Nereus, Achilleus, Domitilla and Pancras continued with that ranking (see General Roman Calendar of 1954) until the revision of 1960, when it was reclassified as a third-class feast (see General Roman Calendar of 1960).

In the present General Roman Calendar, revised in 1969, Saints Nereus and Achilleus (together) and Saint Pancras have distinct celebrations (optional memorials) on 12 May. Saint Domitilla is not included in the revised calendar, because the liturgical honours once paid to her "have no basis in tradition".

== See also ==
- Saint Pancras of Rome, patron saint archive
- St Pancras, London
- Church of Saint Pancras
