= Hack Fall Wood =

Site of Special Scientific Interest in North Yorkshire, England

- Site of Special Scientific Interest
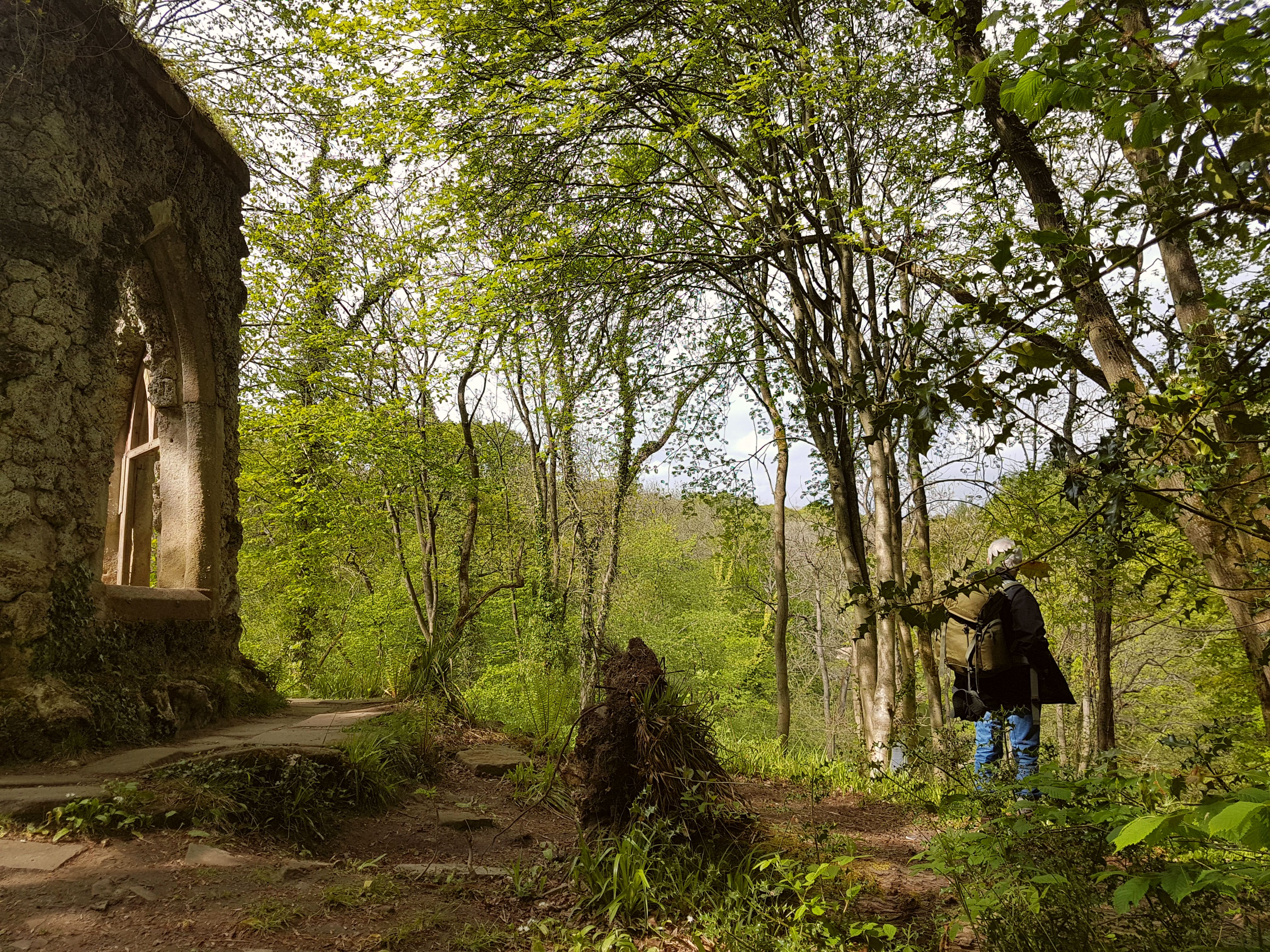
- Fisher's Hall folly in Hack Fall Wood

- Location within North Yorkshire
- Location of Hack Fall Wood.
- Area of search: North Yorkshire
- Grid reference: SE235772
- Coordinates: 54.1890°N 1.6388°W
- Interest: Biological
- Area: 44.8687 hectares (0.4487 km^{2}; 0.1732 sq mi)
- Notification date: 6 October 1989
- Location map: Magic Map (Defra)

Hack Fall Wood, otherwise known as Hackfall, is a Site of Special Scientific Interest, or SSSI, of 44.8687 hectares (0.4487 km^{2}; 0.1732 sq mi), lying north-east of the village of Grewelthorpe, North Yorkshire, England. During the 18th century it was landscaped in the picturesque style by landowner William Aislabie, who created views by engineering streams and pools, planting trees and building follies. J. M. W. Turner and William Sawrey Gilpin painted it, and pictures of it featured on Catherine the Great's 1773 Wedgwood dinner service. Some 19th-century writers called it "one of the most beautiful woods in the country."

Following 20th century clear-felling and natural regeneration of trees, the Woodland Trust purchased the property in 1989. The site was designated as an SSSI in the same year. Together with the Hackfall Trust and the Landmark Trust, the Woodland Trust restored footpaths, conserved the remaining follies and managed the wildlife habitat according to its SSSI status.

The woodland supports varied wildlife, including many birds, animals and flowering plants, plus more than 200 species of liverworts and mosses, and two rare creatures: the beetle Platycis minutus and the lemon slug, which lives only in ancient woodland. The site is now listed as a Conservation Area, and as Ancient Semi-Natural Woodland (ASNW). The woodland lies within the Nidderdale National Landscape. It is open to the public and has many summer visitors, although the only public facility is a car park.

== Site history ==
There is local evidence of earlier settlements in this area. There are prehistoric earthworks at Magdalen Hill, the name Camp Hill suggests a Roman encampment, and the name Grewelthorpe implies Danish settlement. It is possible that the name Hackfall derives simply from haggen, an Old Norse word associated with tree felling, and the fall of water through the Hackfall Gorge.

Hack Fall Wood is a Grade I listed Historic Garden. The listed follies on the site are Mowbray Point Ruin, Mowbray Castle, the Rustic Temple, and Fisher's Hall. Fisher's Hall is dated 1750, and named after William Aislabie's gardener.

=== Follies ===
==== Fisher's Hall ====
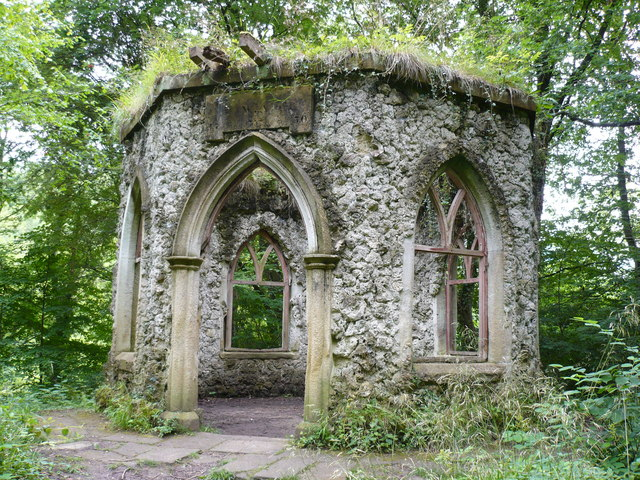
Fisher's Hall

Fisher's Hall was completed in 1750, and is grade II listed. It is built of tufa, and has an octagonal plan and a single storey. It is without a roof, it has a plain eaves band, and is in Gothic style. The building contains a doorway with a pointed moulded arch and pilasters, above which is a dated and initialled tablet. On the other sides are window openings with pointed arches.

==== Mowbray Castle ====
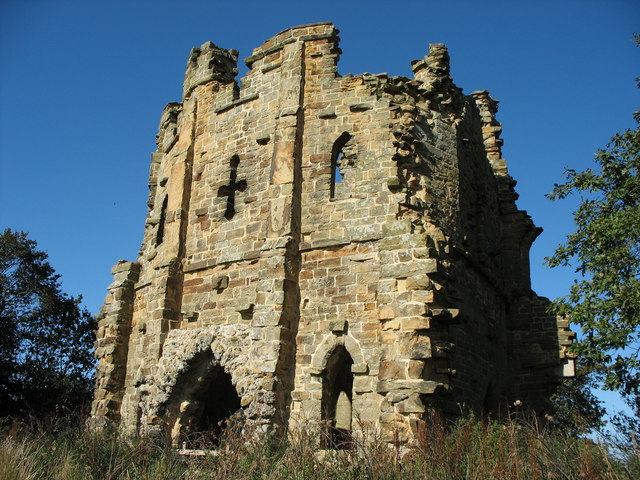
Mowbray Castle

Mowbray Castle was also built in about 1750, and is grade II listed. It is in the form of a ruined stone Gothic tower. There are two storeys, an oval plan, and a front of three bays. In the centre is a large opening with a pointed arch, and the flanking wings contain smaller pointed arches with imposts. Above is a floor band, a cross-shaped opening in the middle bay and pointed arches in the outer bays. At the top are the remains of an eaves band and a parapet.

==== Rustic Temple ====
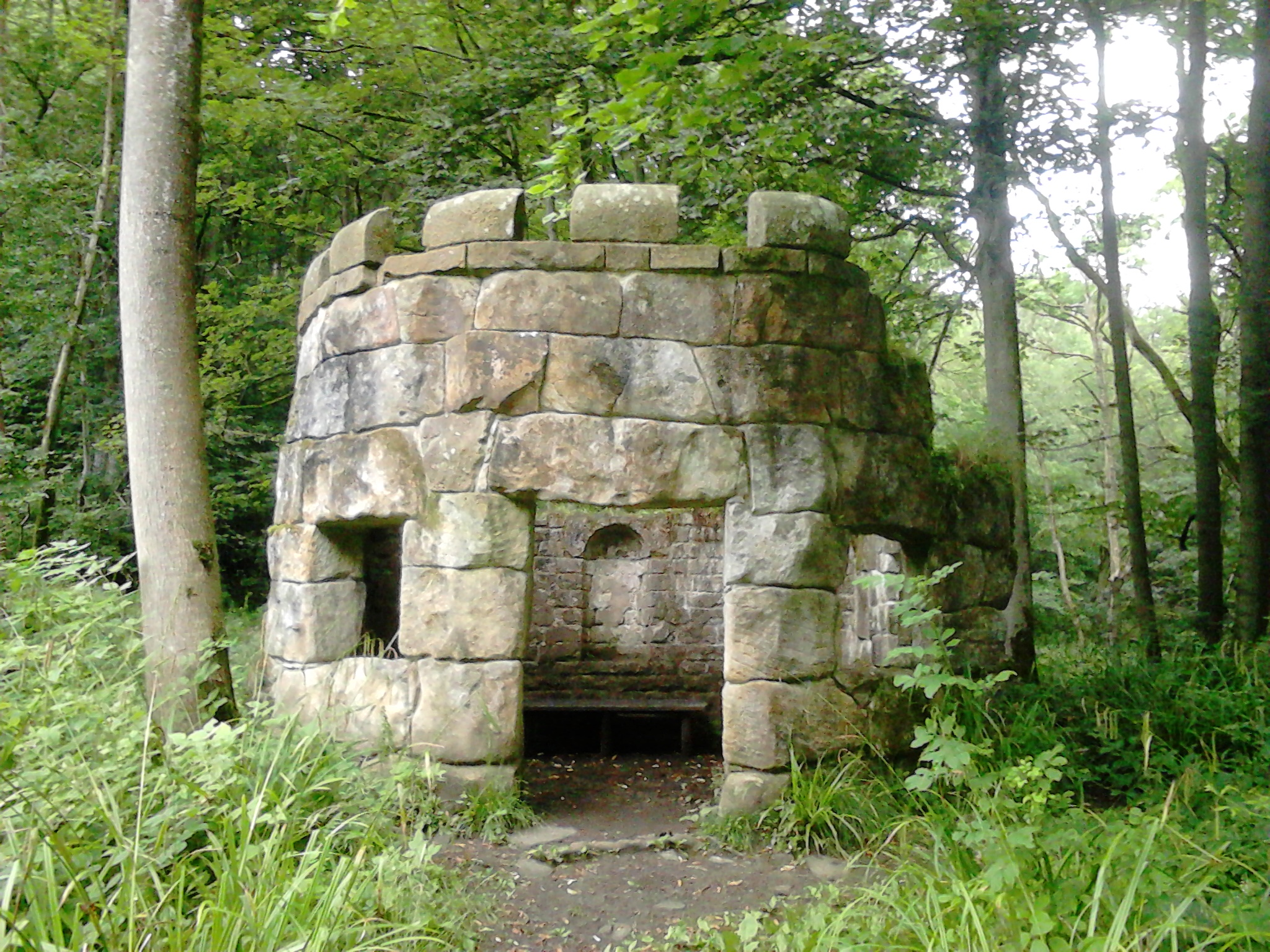
Rustic Temple

The Rustic Temple is grade II listed and is also mid-18th century. It is stone-built and is now a ruin. It has a single storey and an octagonal plan. On the front is an opening, flanked by square openings, all under large lintels. Inside, in the middle of the back wall, is a round-headed niche.

==== Mowbray Point Ruin ====
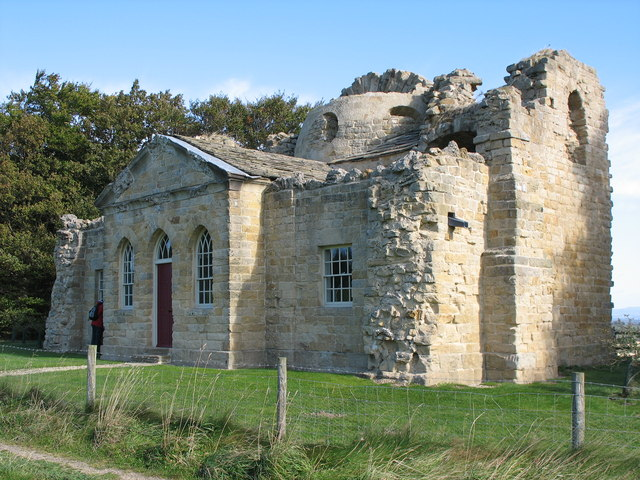
Mowbray Point Ruin

The ruin at Mowbray Point was built as a banqueting hall. It is also mid-18th century and is the only grade II* listed folly in the wood. It is partly ruined, and is built of stone and tufa. The front range has one storey and five bays, the middle three bays projecting under a pediment with a moulded cornice. In the centre is a doorway flanked by windows, all with pointed arches and voussoirs. The outer bays contain rectangular windows. At the rear are three round arches, the middle one tallest, and a domed roof pierced by roundels. Outside these are tunnel vaults with niches.

==== Other follies ====
The grotto was constructed as a place to sit and rest, and admire the view of a 40 feet (12 m) drop. By the mid-20th century it had almost entirely collapsed, and so it was not listed with the other follies. The walls have since been rebuilt, using rubble from the original building, and a bench set inside them. There are no plans to restore the roof.

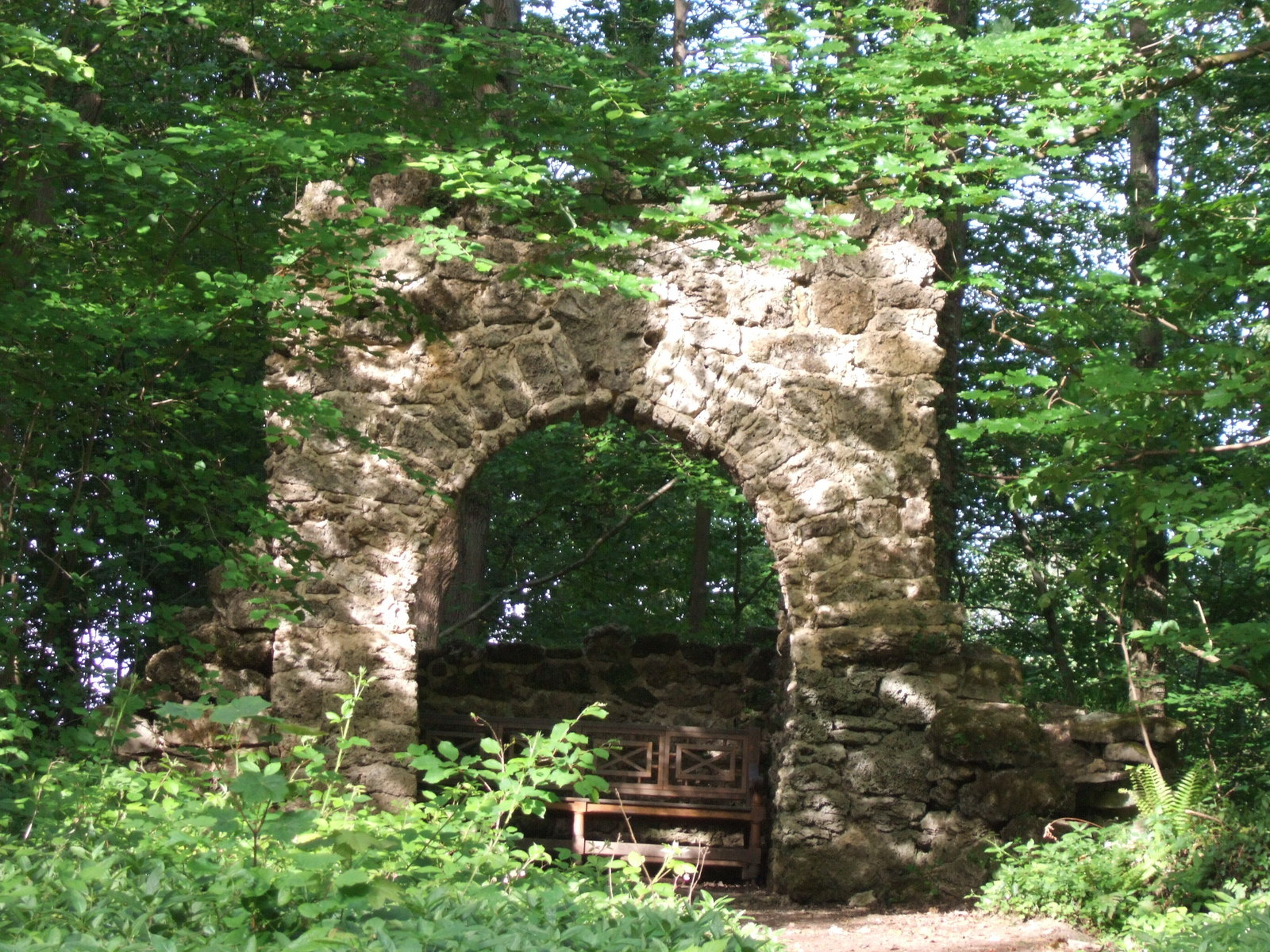
Grotto

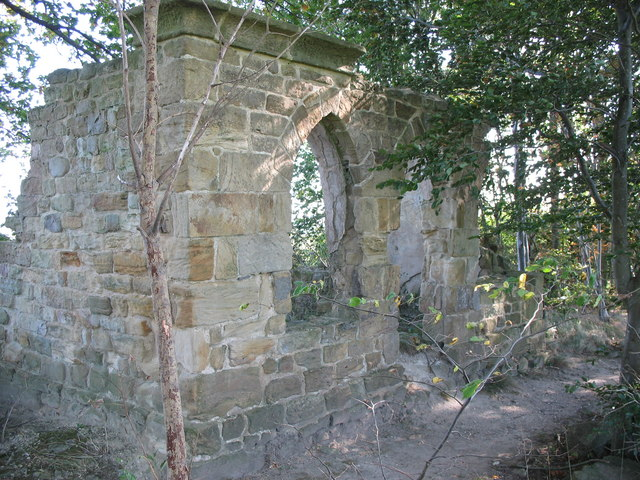
Gothic Kitchen

=== Landscaping ===
In previous centuries the area which is now designated an SSSI was called Hackfall. John Aislabie (1670–1742) of Studley Royal Park, who had been responsible for the formal-style landscaping of Studley Royal and Fountains Abbey, purchased this land in 1731. He bought it for its timber, and perhaps also for its lime kiln, the coal pits near Limehouse Hill, sandstone quarries for repairing Ripon Cathedral, and the sawmill. His son William Aislabie (1700–1781), with an eye to the sublime aesthetic, landscaped the site in a natural, picturesque style with follies, an artificial waterfall, temples and grottoes among the trees, and the kinds of views and glades which were fashionable at the time. Aislabie used the Banqueting House, now known as the Mowbray Point Ruin, to entertain friends, and in the 19th century this became a tea room for tourists, when Hackfall was the property of Lord Ripon and available to those could pay for entry. Mowbray Point may have been designed by Robert Adam, and is now a holiday cottage controlled by the Landmark Trust.

"Nineteenth century writers hailed [Hackfall] as one of the most beautiful woodlands in the country;" J. M. W. Turner and William Sawrey Gilpin painted here. Hackfall is mentioned in William Wordsworth's Guide to the Lakes, and in works by Arthur Young and Reverend Richard Warner. It was pictured on five or six items of Wedgwood's 944-piece Frog dinner service of 1773, made for Catherine the Great.

=== Hackfall before the felling ===
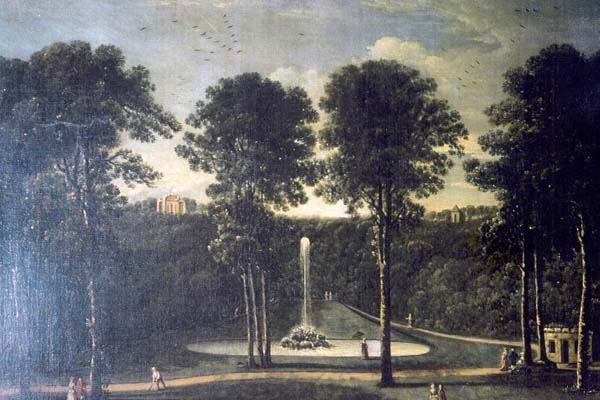
Hackfall, 18th century

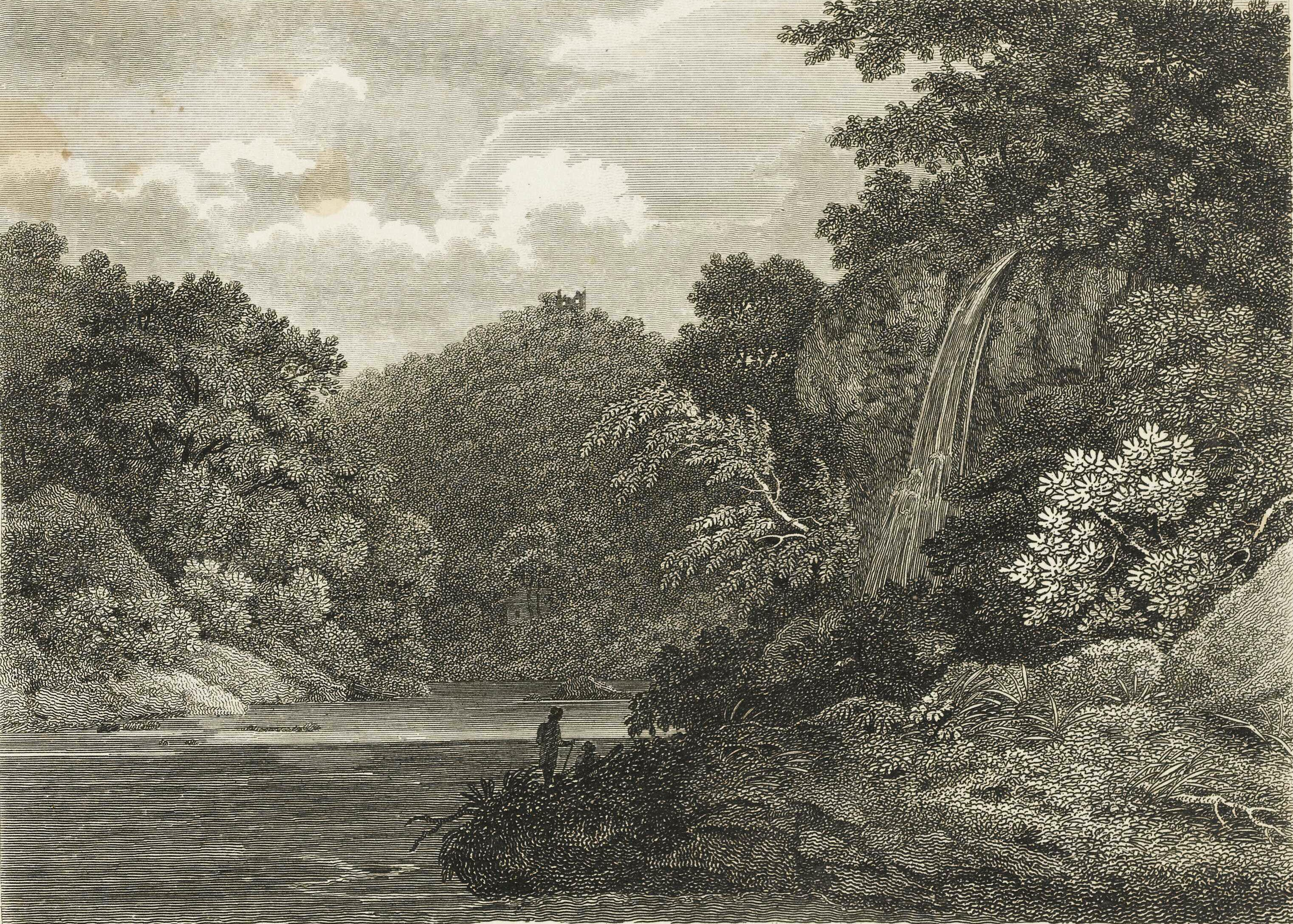
Hackfall, 1809

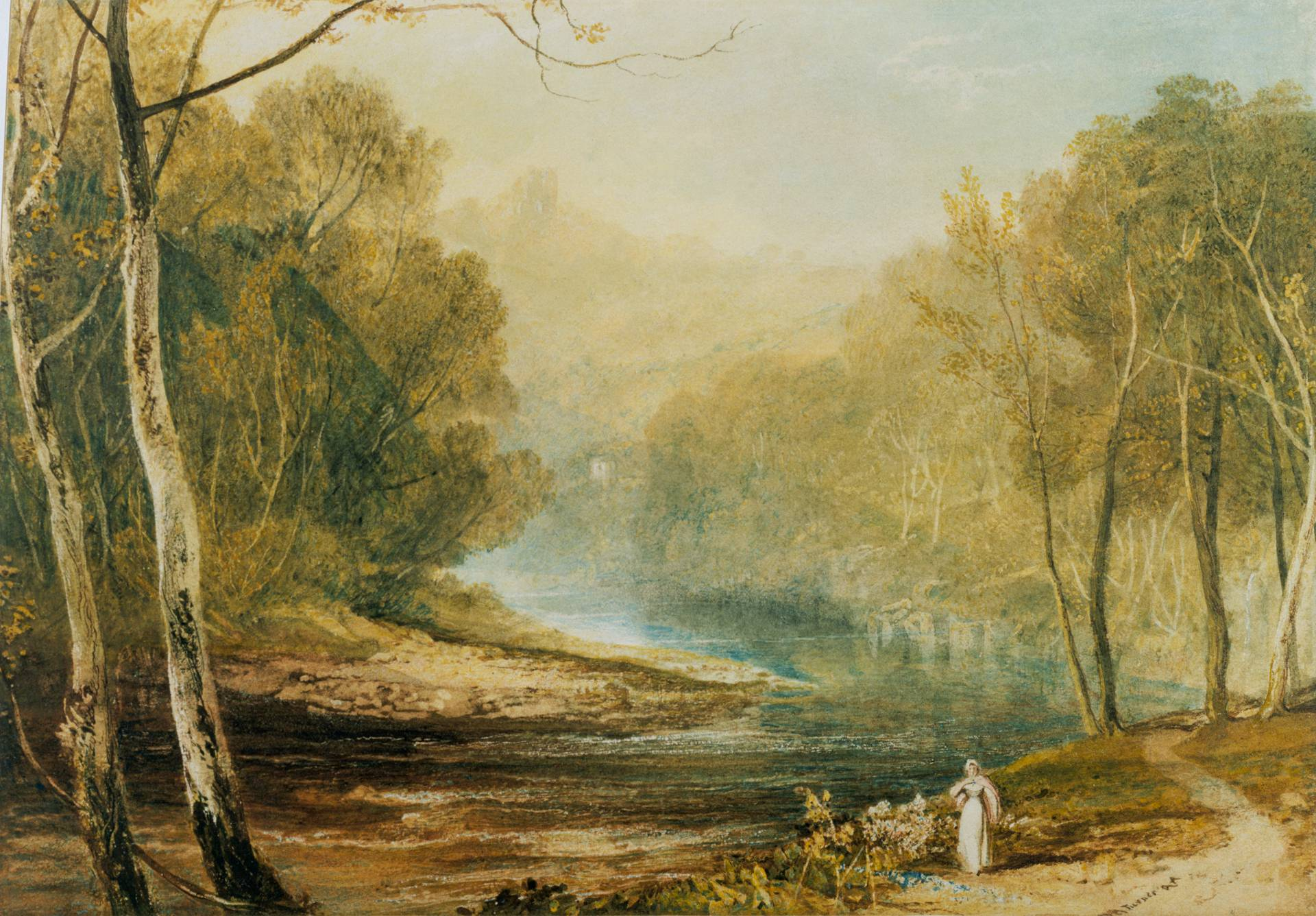
Hackfall by J. M. W. Turner, 1816

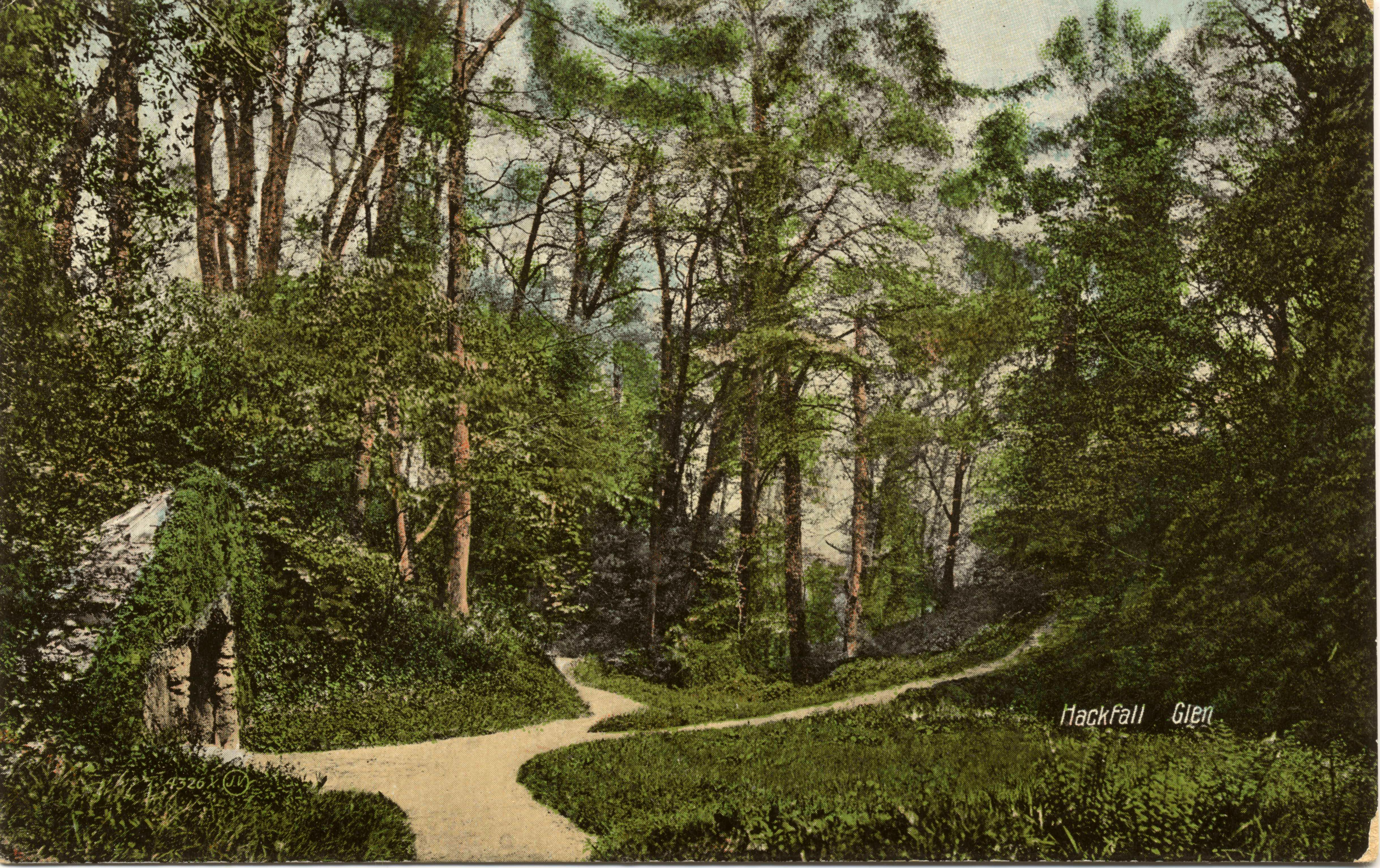
Hackfall, 1902–1905

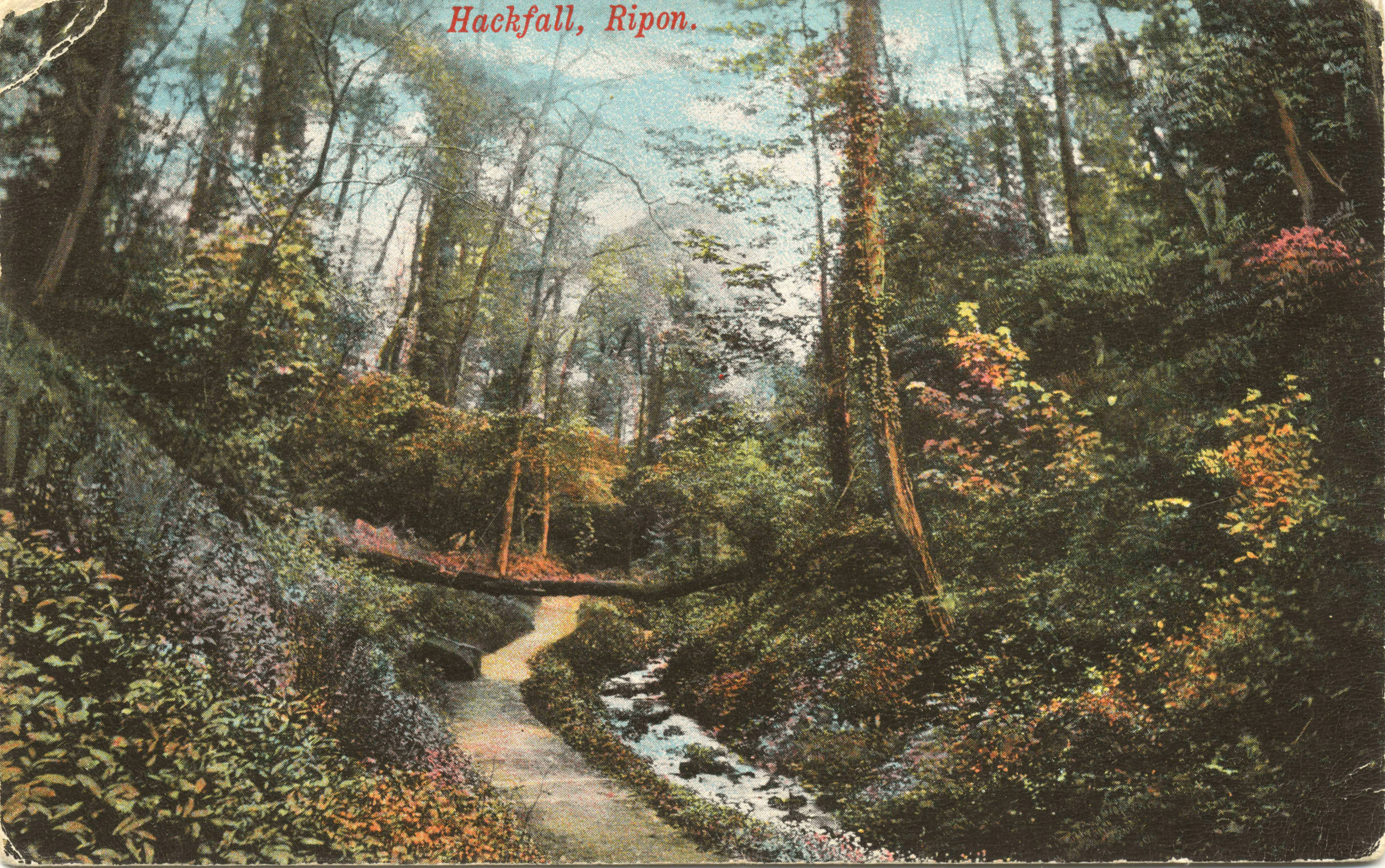
Hackfall, 1905

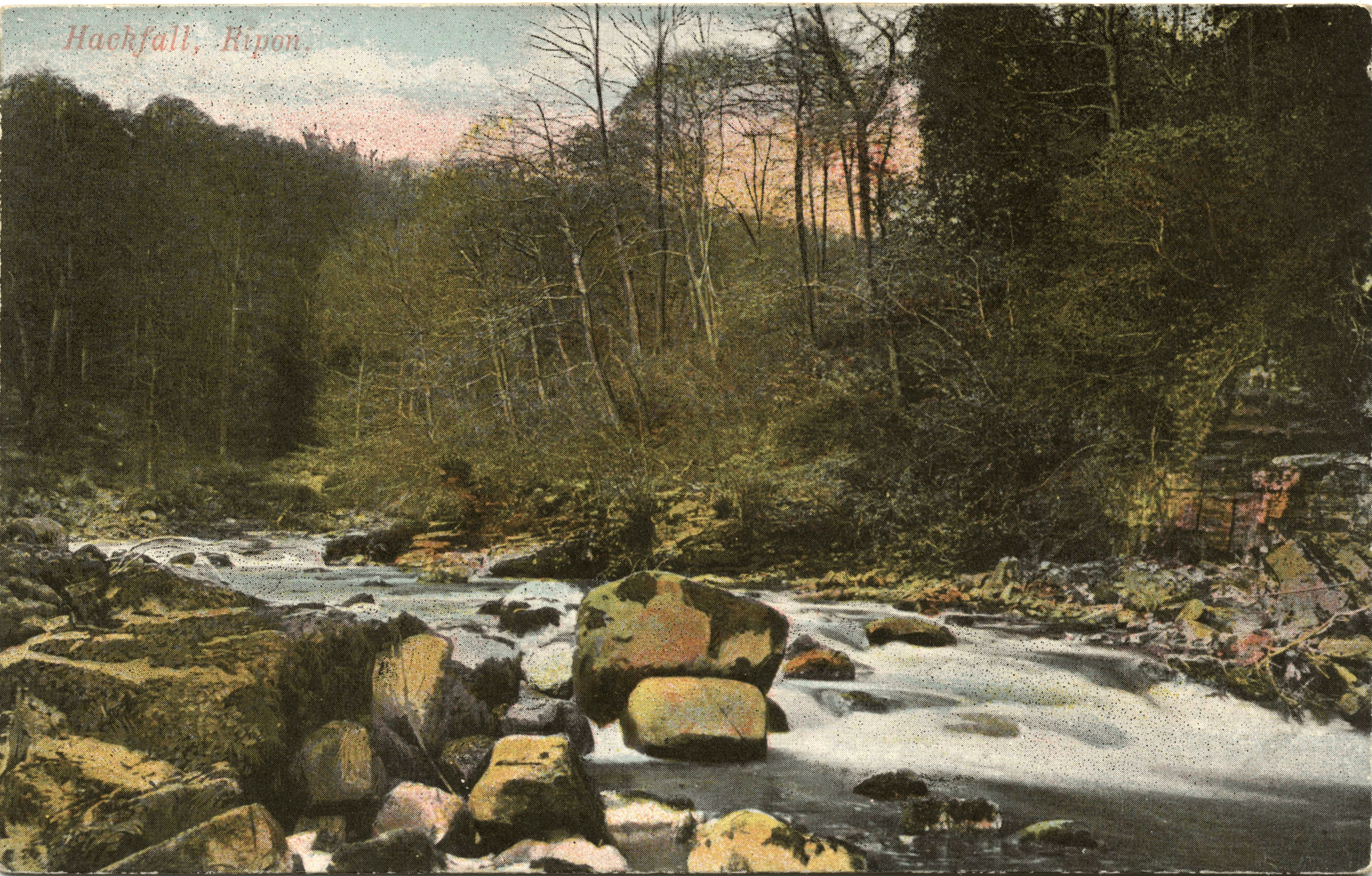
Hackfall, 1908

=== Felling ===
In March 1933 after the National Trust failed to purchase it due to lack of funds, timber merchant John Green bought the wood, and most of it was clear-felled, then partially replanted with conifers. By 1937 Hackfall was a commercial farm and woodland, then during World War II it was allowed to degenerate, and fell prey to vandalism. Some features, including wooden buildings, were lost during the 1930s and 1940s, including cascades, weirs, benches, seats, a pair of summerhouses, and two items called the Sentry Box and the Tent. The wood was, however, allowed to regenerate naturally until the 1980s, and a small part still remains of the Sandbed Hut near Limehouse Hill, and the entrance Gate Pillars.

=== Restoration ===
When the property was offered for sale in 1987 and a threat of commercial development was noted, the Hackfall Trust was formed to raise funds for restoration of the landscaping. In 1989 the Woodland Trust purchased it on a 999-year lease, "restoring footpaths and woodland walks, conserving the various follies, managing the fragile habitats."

Almost £1,000,000 was given to the Woodland Trust by the National Lottery Heritage Fund for restoration in 2007. The work was also funded by Yorventure and Nidderdale Area of Outstanding Natural Beauty. The three organisations responsible for organising the restoration and maintenance of the site are the Hackfall Trust, the Woodland Trust and the Landmark Trust. The Landscape Agency carried out the work, and received the Landscape Award in 2008 from RIBA White Rose Awards. A warden was provided for the wood in 2009. The Hackfall and Woodland Trusts were under contract to maintain the woodland until around 2034.

=== Hack Fall Wood after regeneration ===
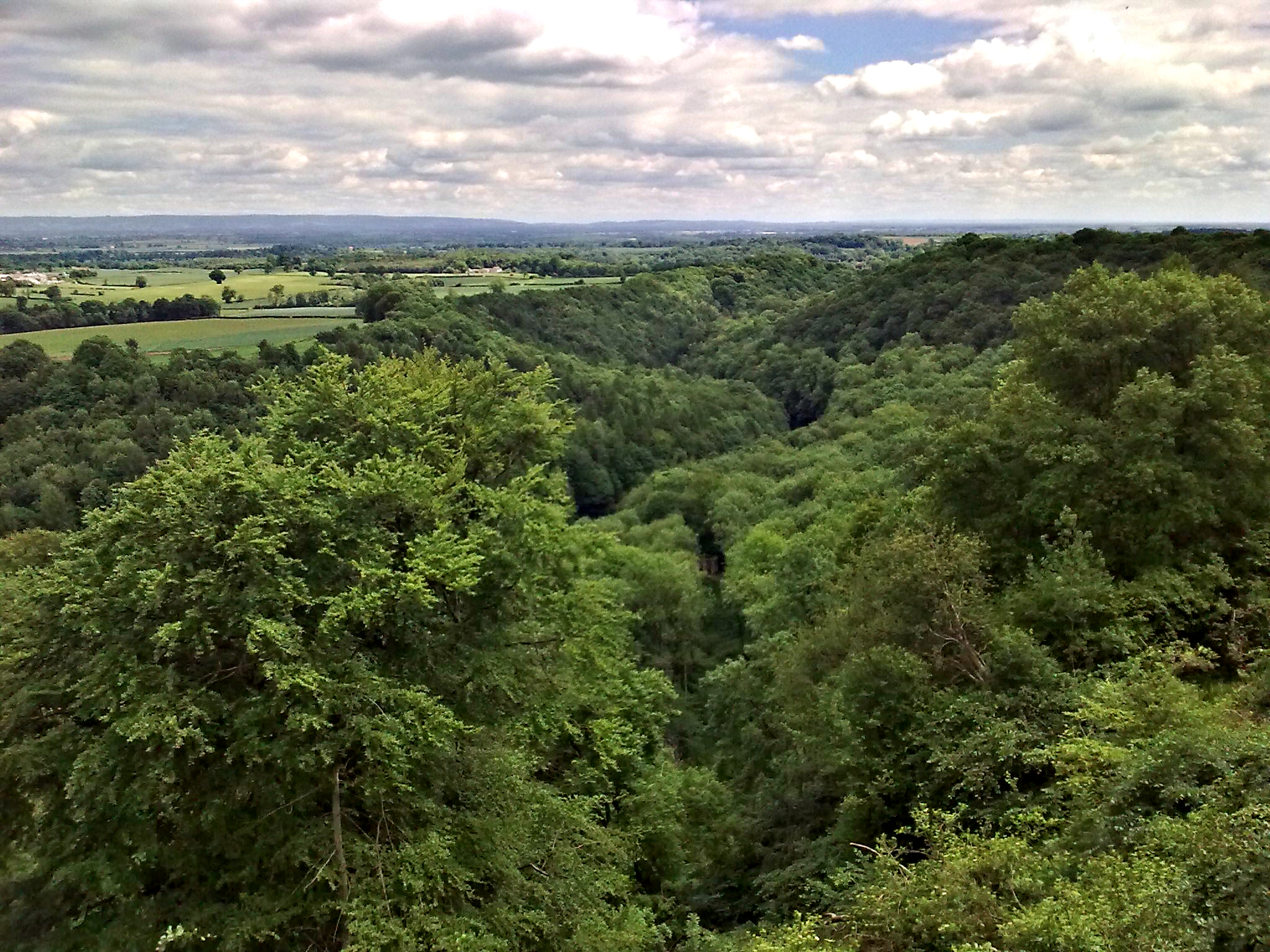
View from above, 2010

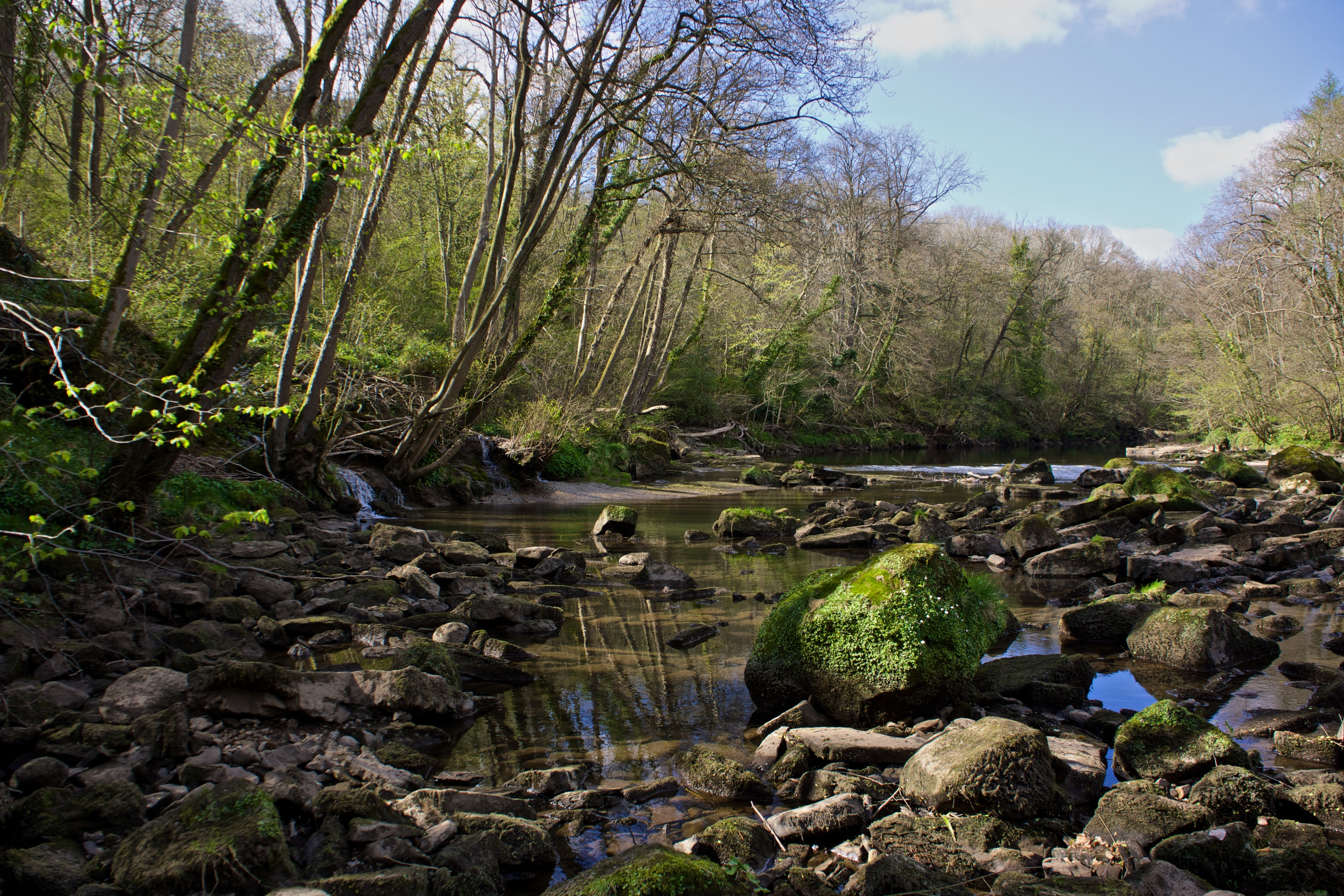
River Ure view, 2014

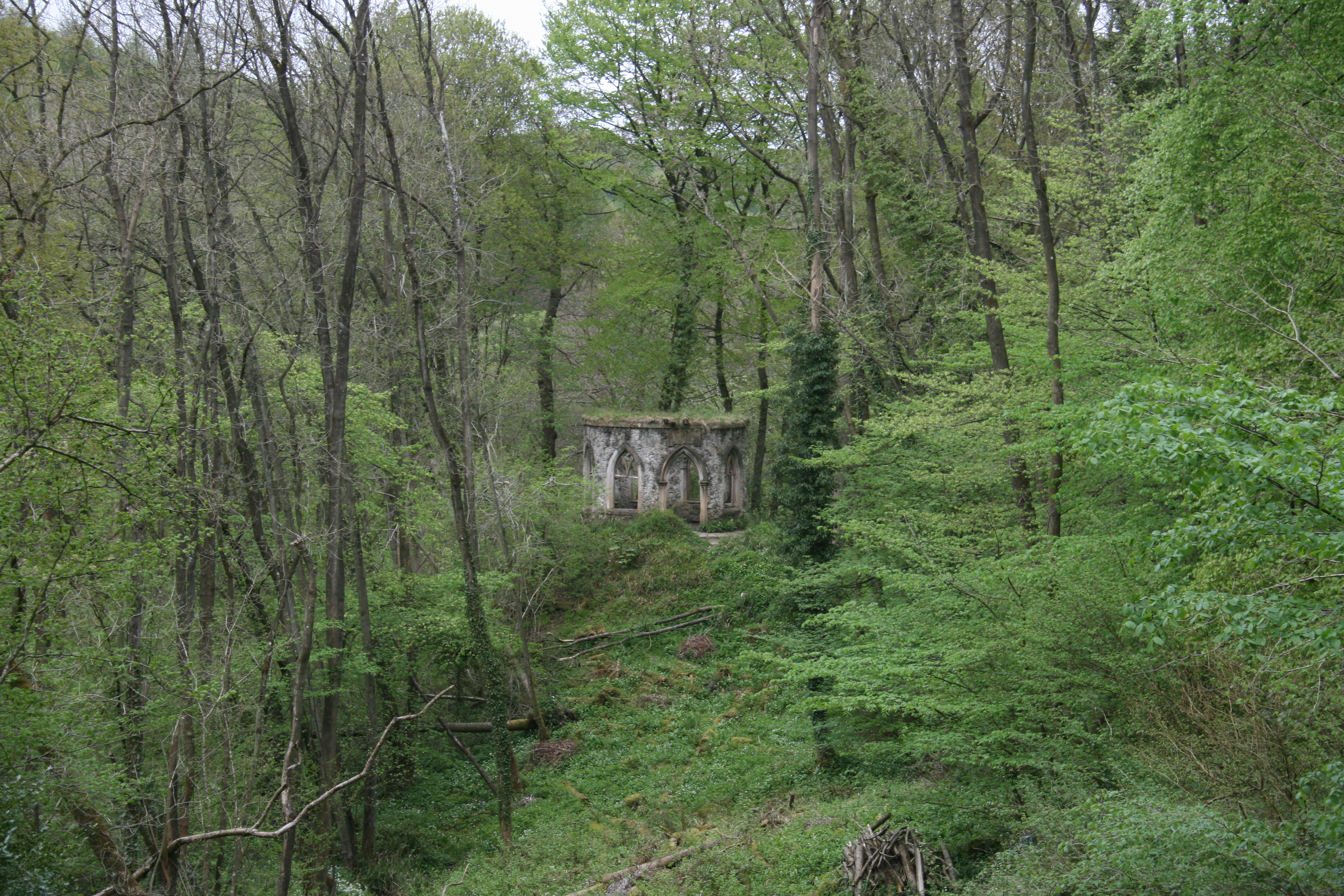
Fisher's Hall, 2016

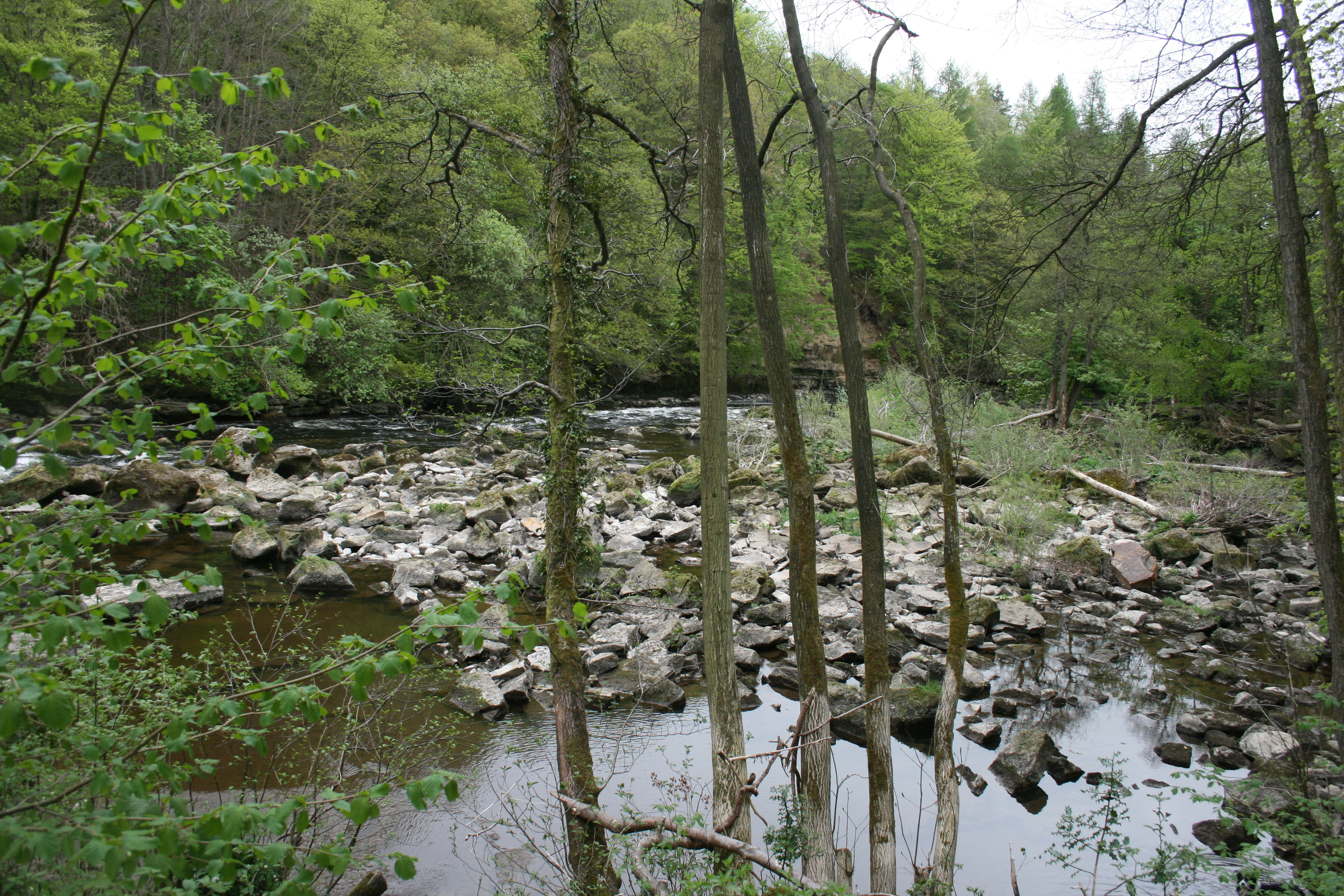
River Ure view, 2016

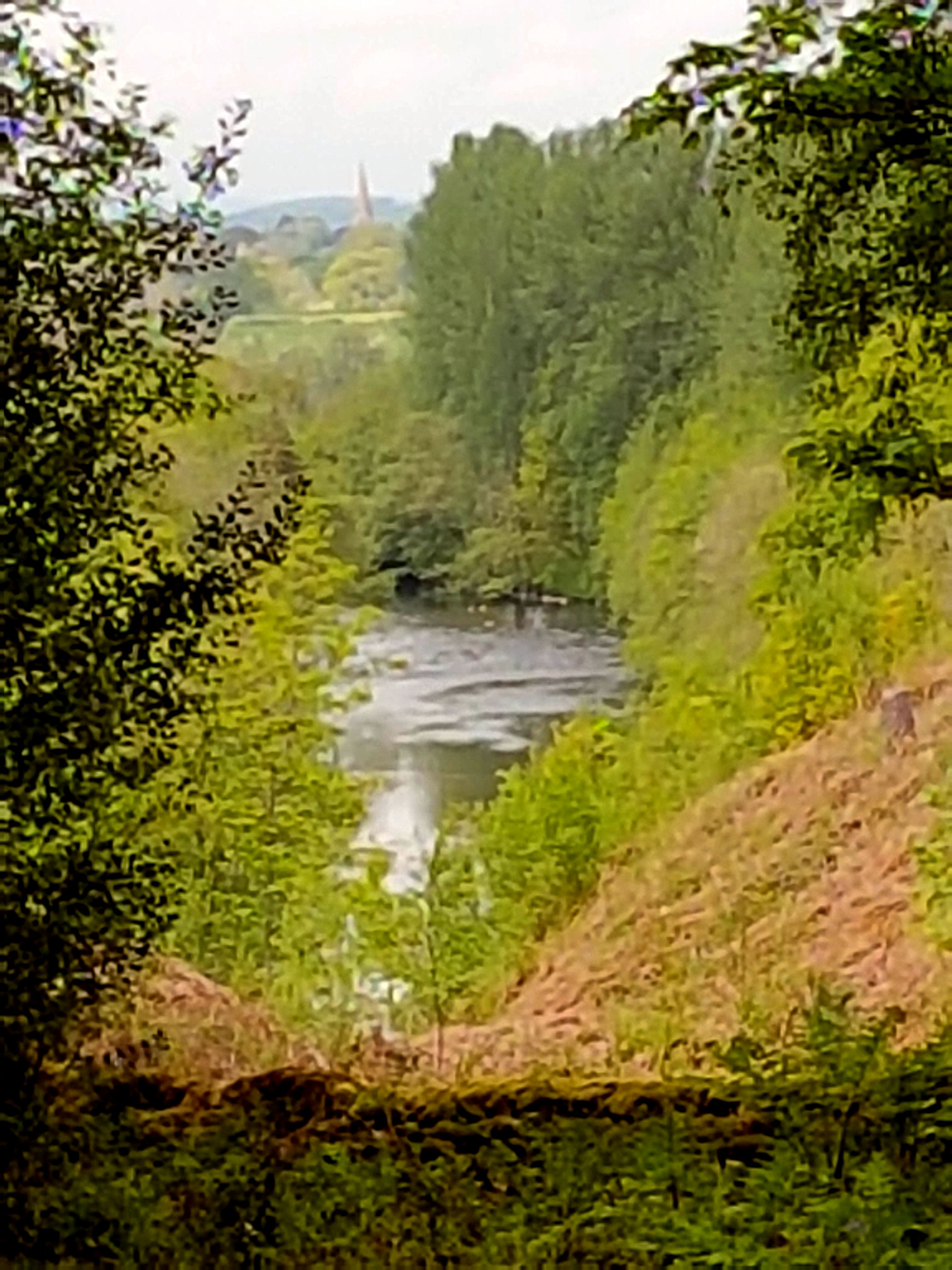
River Ure view, 2019

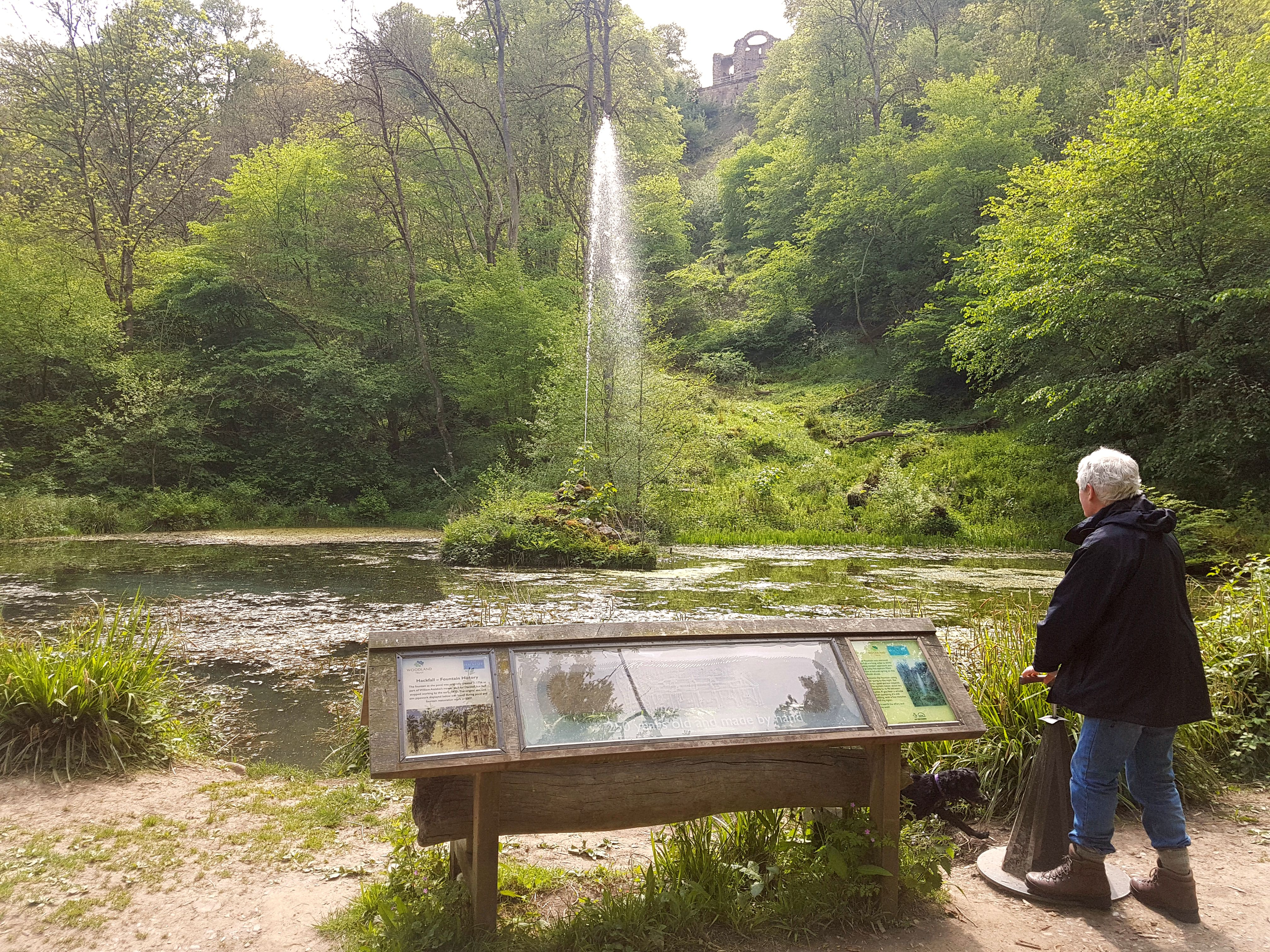
Fountain pond, 2019

== Site location and designation ==
Hack Fall Wood is a 44.8687 hectares (0.4487 km^{2}; 0.1732 sq mi) biological Site of Special Scientific Interest (SSSI), designated because "it is important as a largely undisturbed example of ancient semi-natural broadleaved woodland." This "ancient woodland" with its large variety of flora over a mixed geology holds a valued resource of plant life. The key habitat of Hack Fall Wood is listed as a Conservation Area, it is included in the United Kingdom Biodiversity Action Plan (BAP); it is listed as Ancient Semi-Natural Woodland (ASNW), and it is on the Invertebrate Site Register (ISR).

It sits on the north and east slopes where the River Ure flows through the Hackfall Gorge, the site being adjacent to the north-east side of Grewelthorpe, and south of Masham. There are four separate entrances to the site. Although there are no facilities apart from a comparatively recent car park, the site has been popular with tourists since the 19th century. There are no toilets, the nearest being at Grewelthorpe or Masham, and there is no wheelchair access, due to rough terrain and steep paths.

== Significant biological content ==
=== Flora ===
This ancient woodland was mostly felled in the 1930s, and the present tree cover has naturally regenerated since then, featuring a diversity of localised species, and also many common species such as sycamore, beech, scots pine, foxglove, dog rose and red campion. Hack Fall Wood is known for its spring carpet of bluebells.

Plants grow here in specific groups according to the underlying geology. For example, around the Brimham Grits cliffs and steep slopes the soil is acidic, and woodland trees are holly, rowan, with a predominant canopy of silver birch and sessile oak. On the woodland floor are cow-wheat, hard fern, heather, bilberry, wavy hair-grass and great wood-rush.

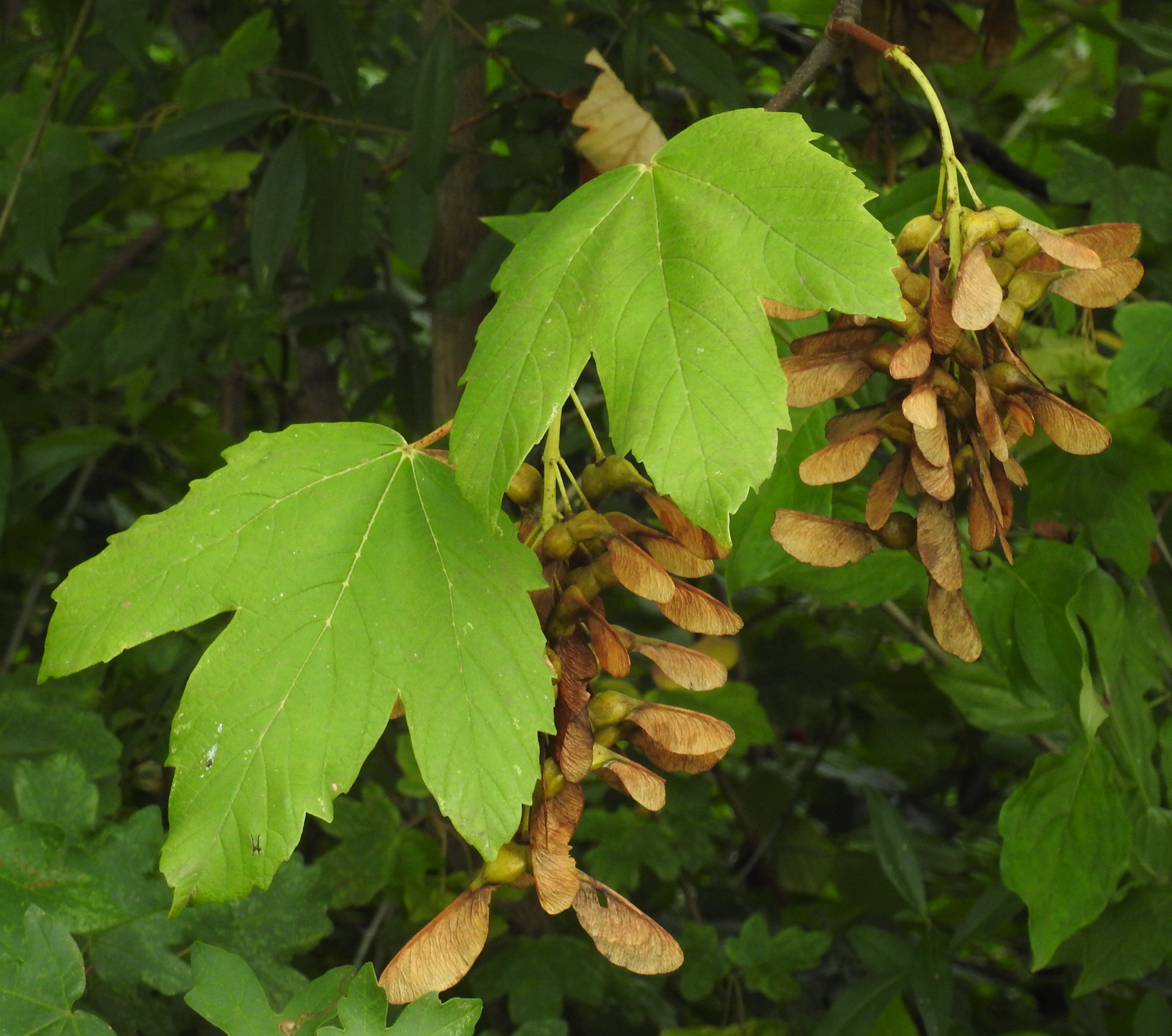
sycamore

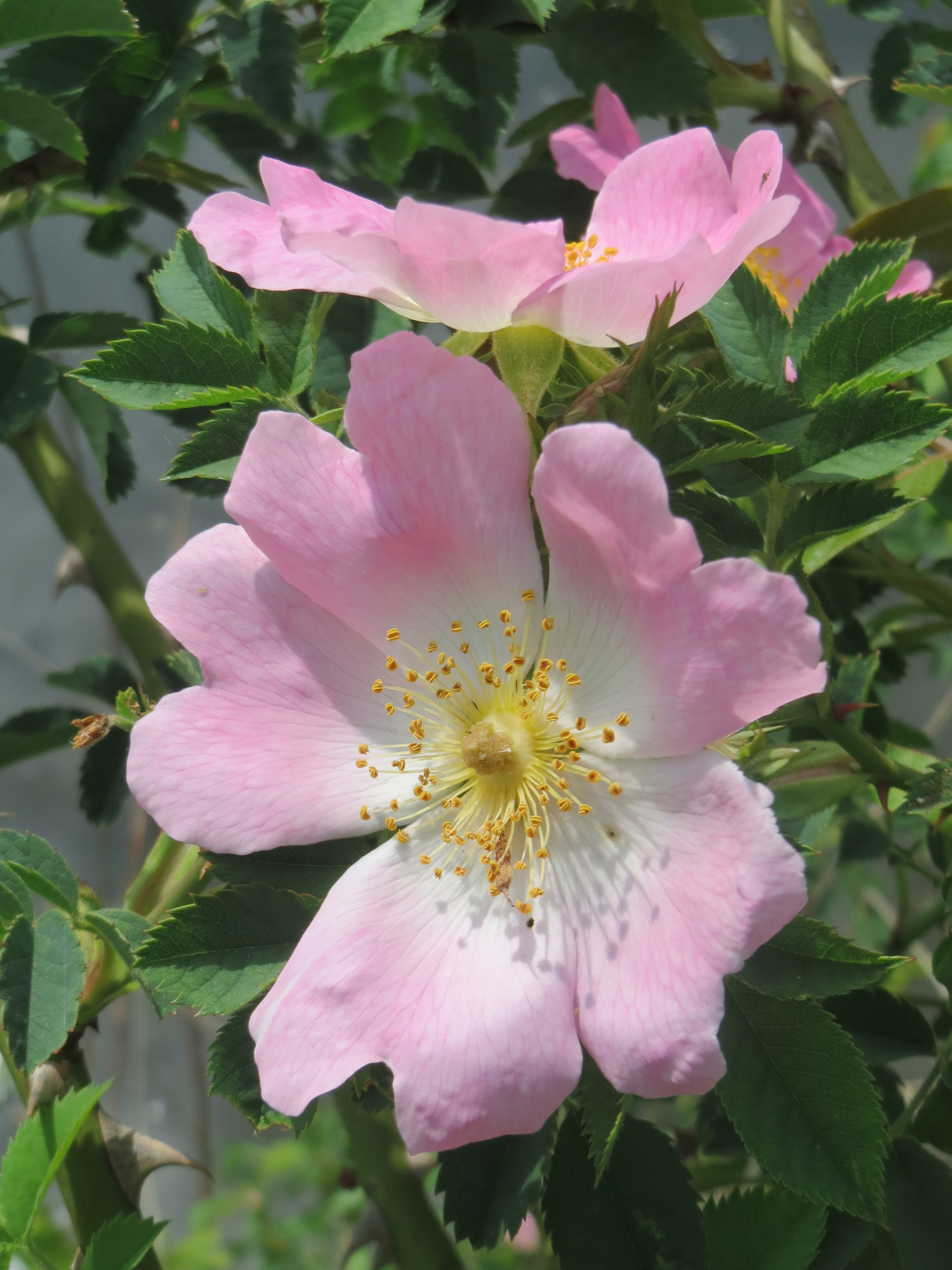
Dog rose

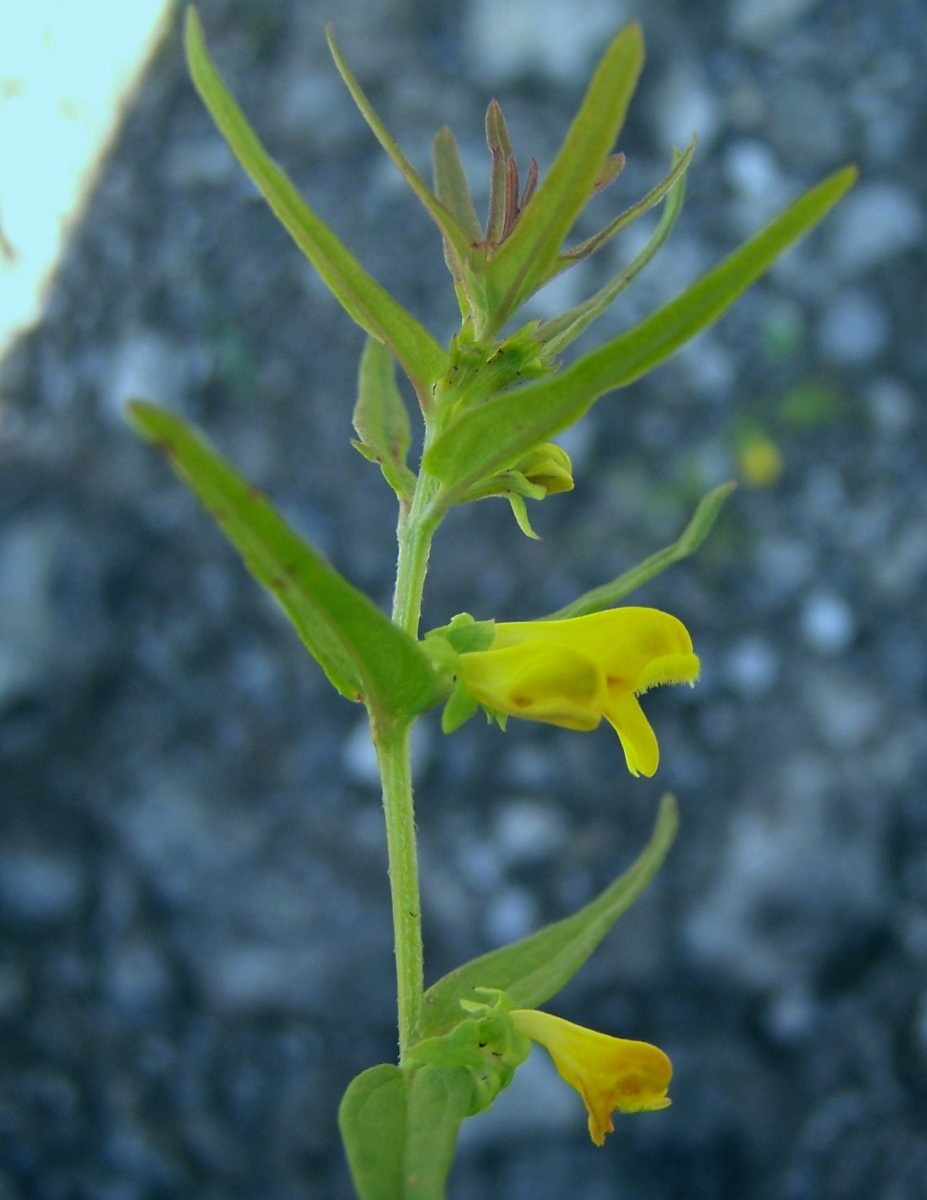
Small cow-wheat

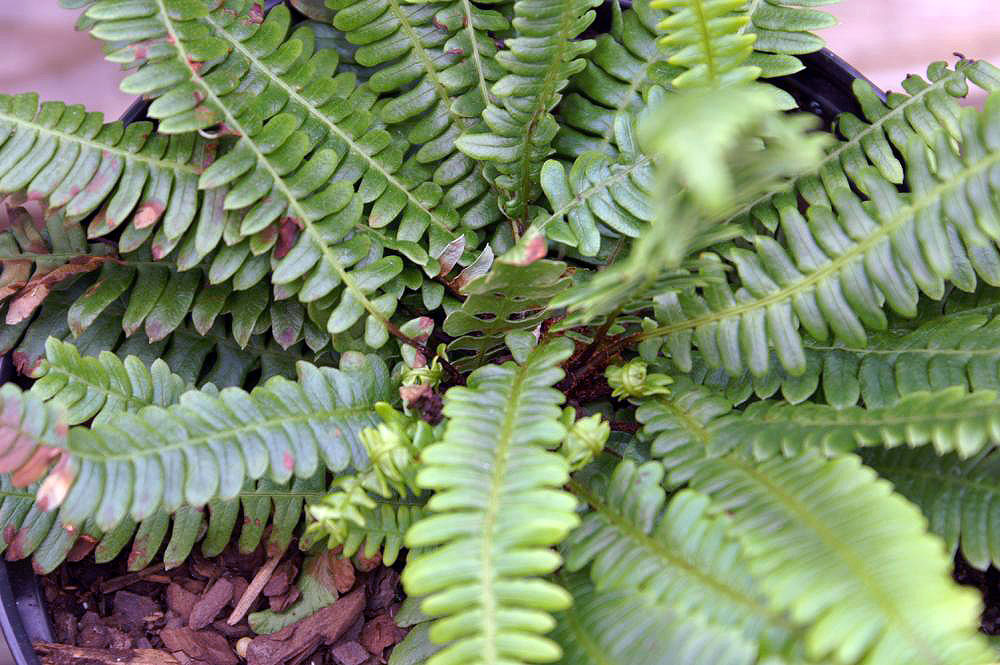
Hard fern

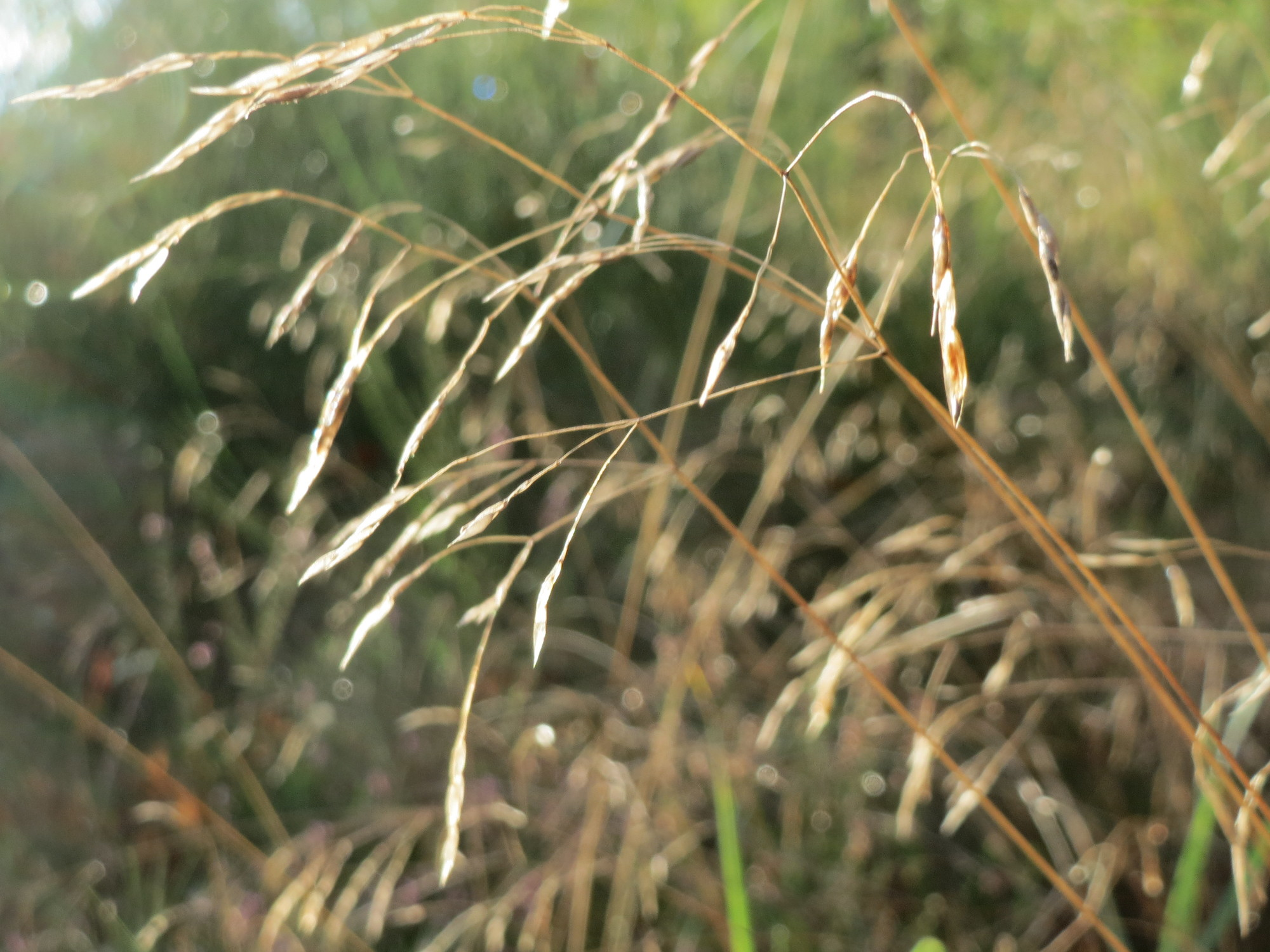
Wavy hair-grass

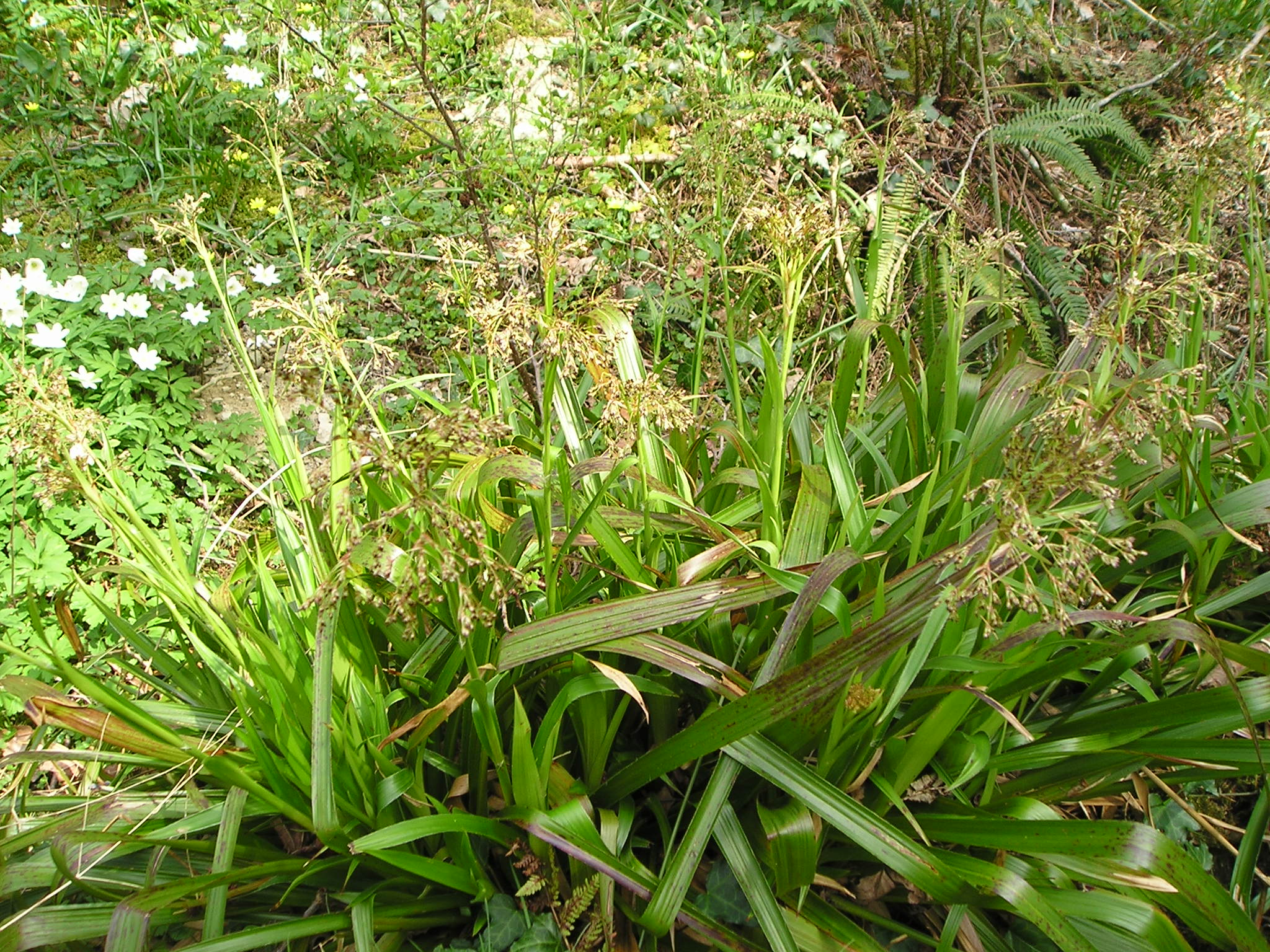
Great wood-rush

Under the less steep slopes are Ure Shell beds, and here the soil is less acidic. Among the herbaceous plants are herb Paris and toothwort, which are "uncommon." Other woodland floor plants here are primrose, wood anemone, enchanter's nightshade, woodruff or sweet-scented bedstraw, ramsons or wild garlic and dog's mercury. This ground flora is described by Natural England as "characteristic of old, established woodland." Above these, the understorey contains guelder rose and hazel. Above this is a canopy of sycamore, wych elm and ash. Lesser celandine, early dog violet, opposite-leaved golden-saxifrage (Chrysosplenium oppositifolium) and wood sorrel are also present in spring.

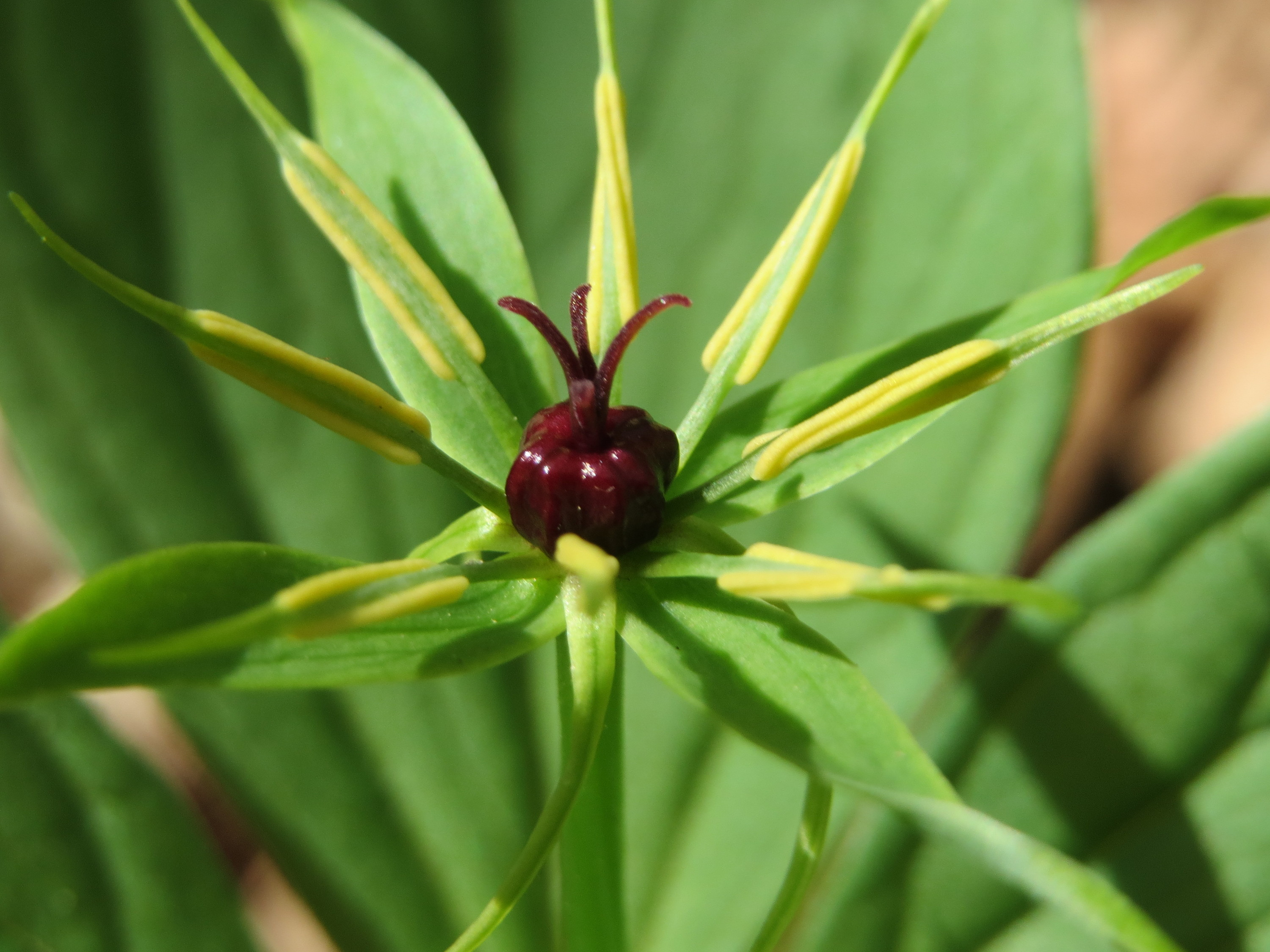
Herb Paris

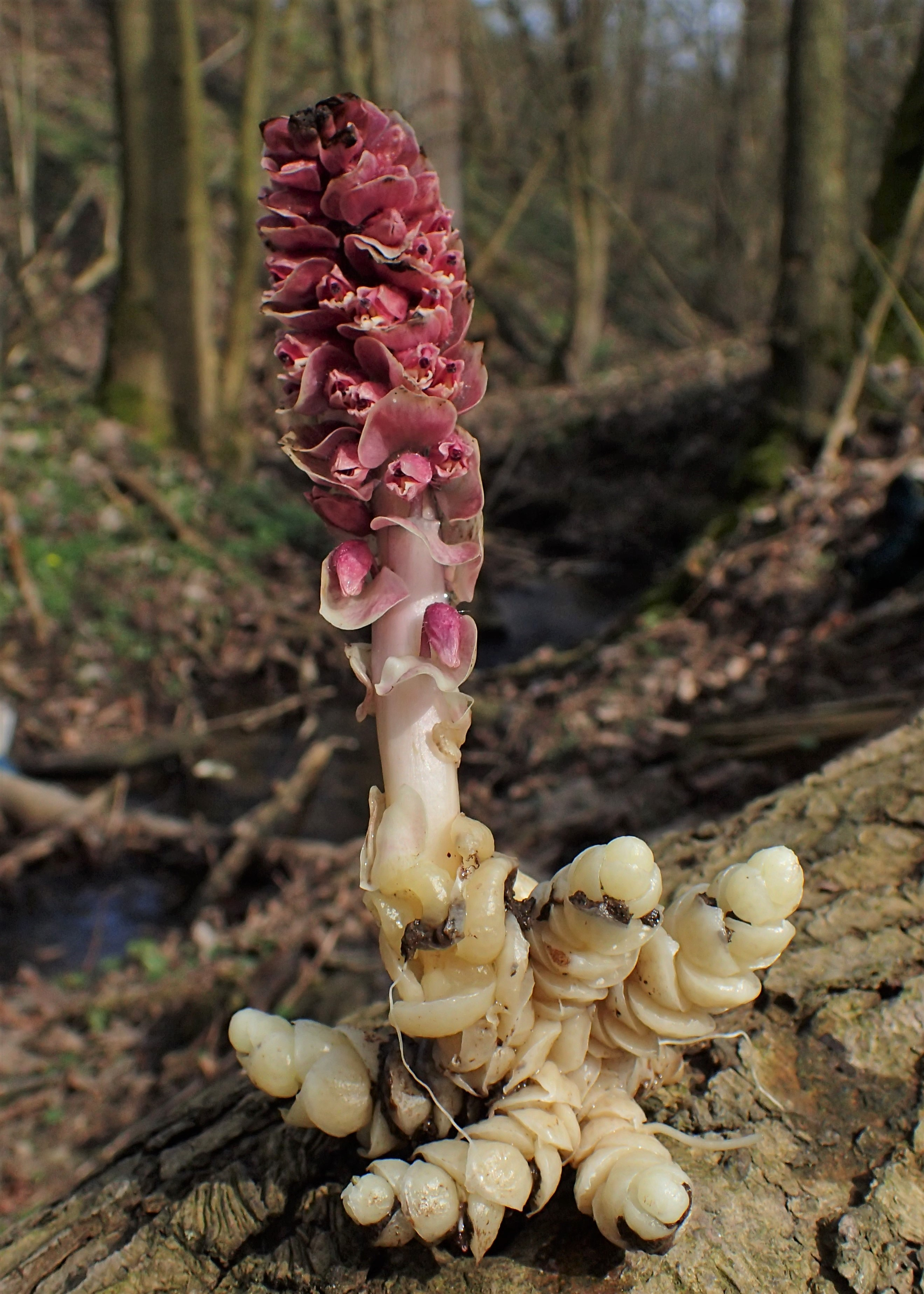
Toothwort

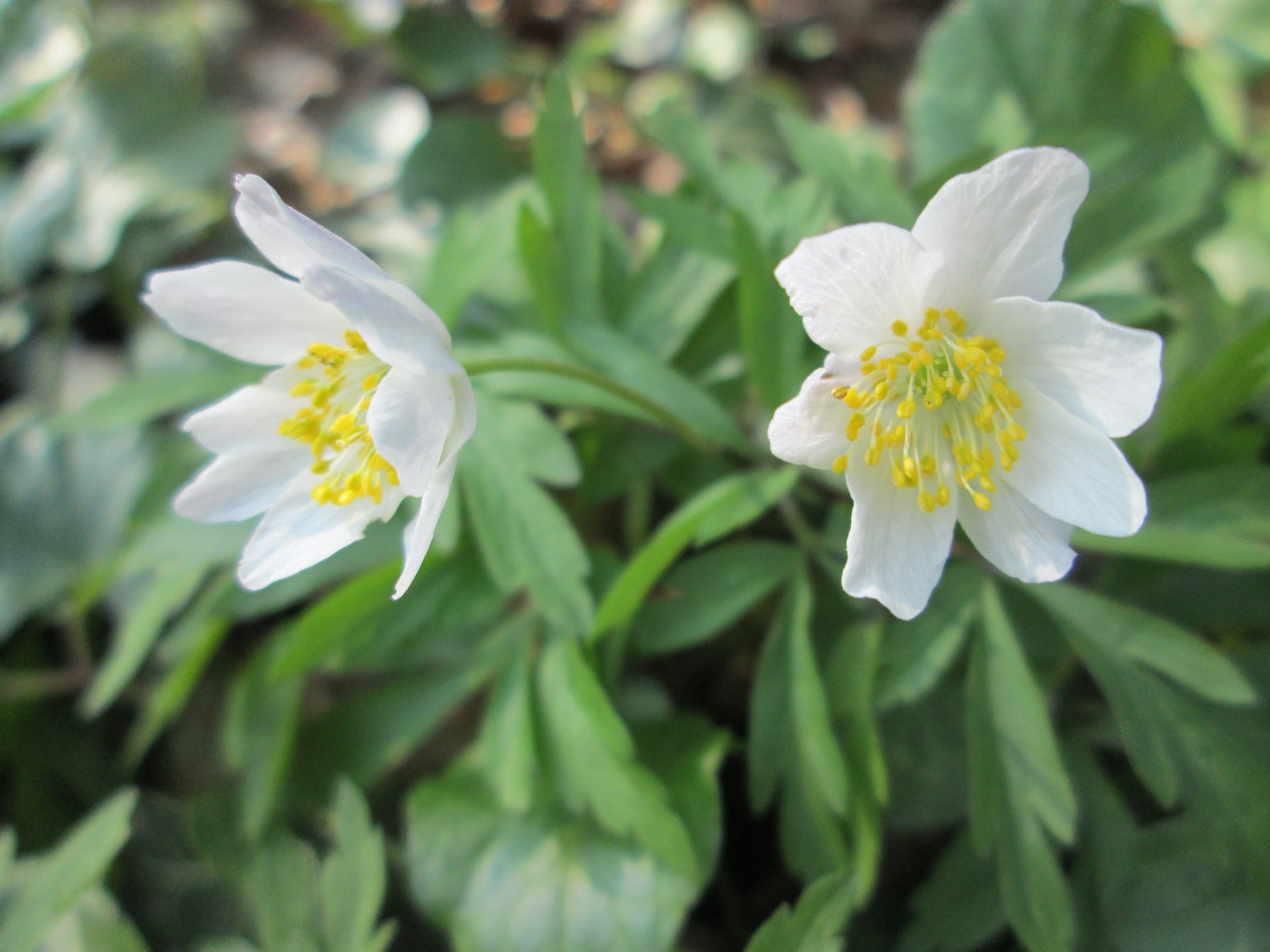
Wood anemone

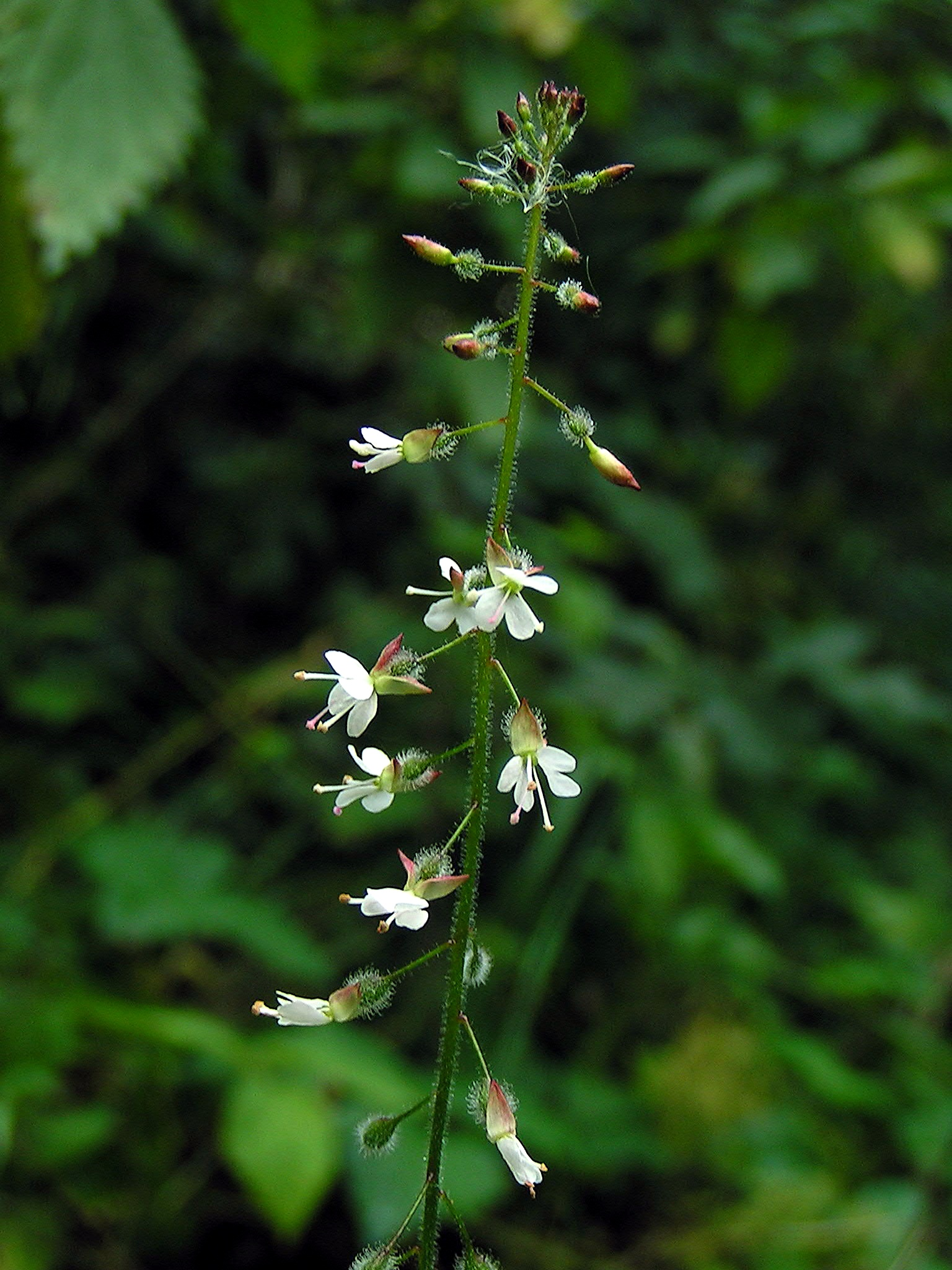
Enchanter's nightshade

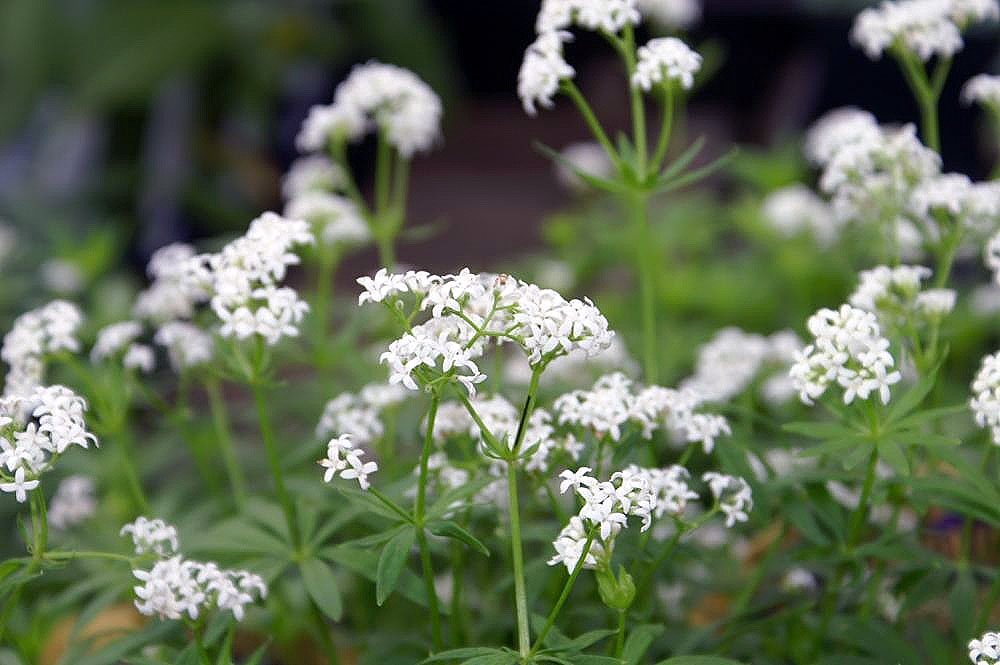
Woodruff

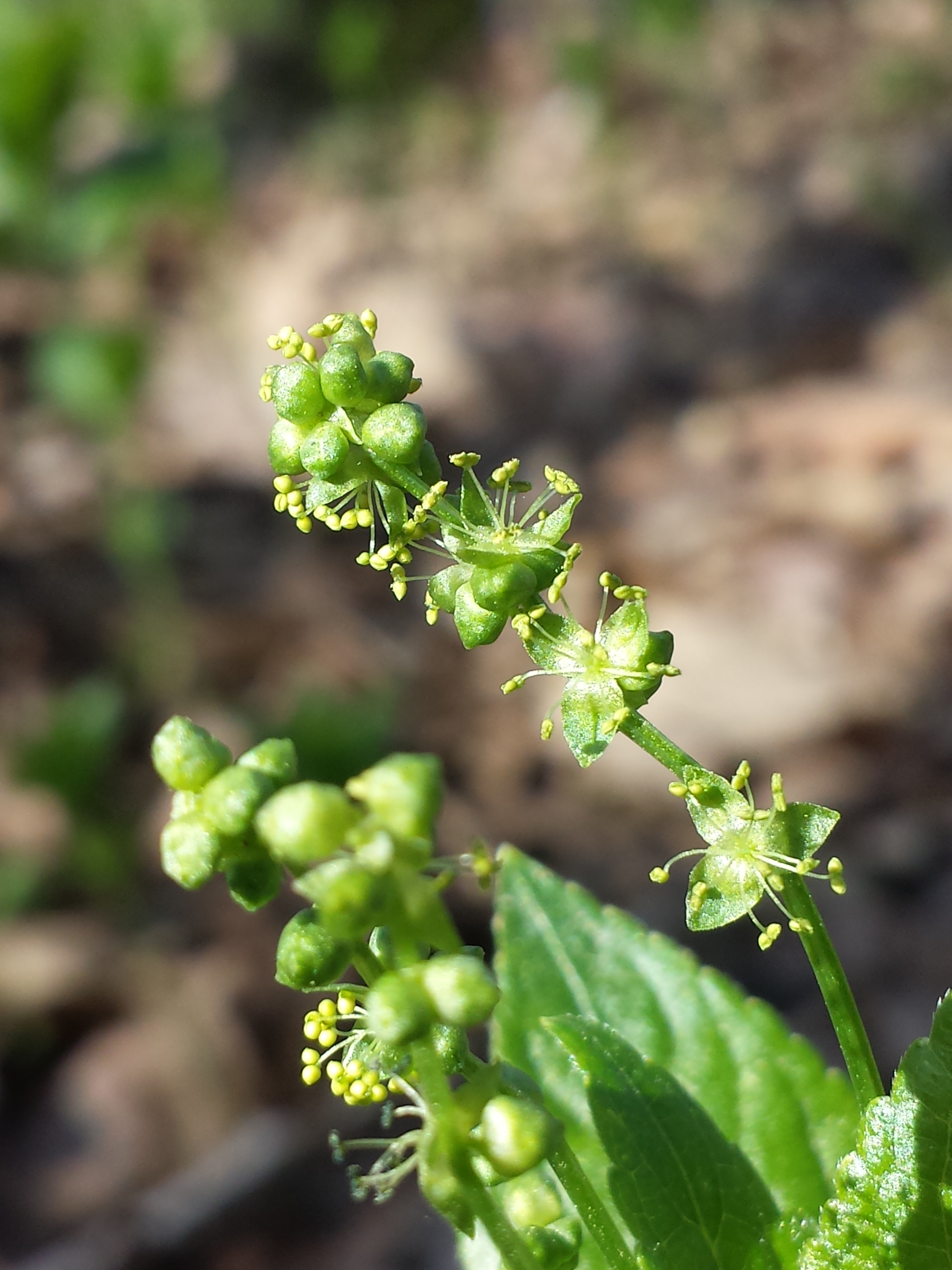
Dog's mercury

This site has many pools and streams, resulting from "a series of calcareous springs," which "give rise to ... extensive flushing." On the wettest ground is tufted hair-grass, pendulous sedge, great horsetail and meadowsweet, below spindle, bird cherry and alder. Beside the streams, on steep sides and rocks, are many bryophytes, and ferns such as male fern, polypody and hart's tongue.

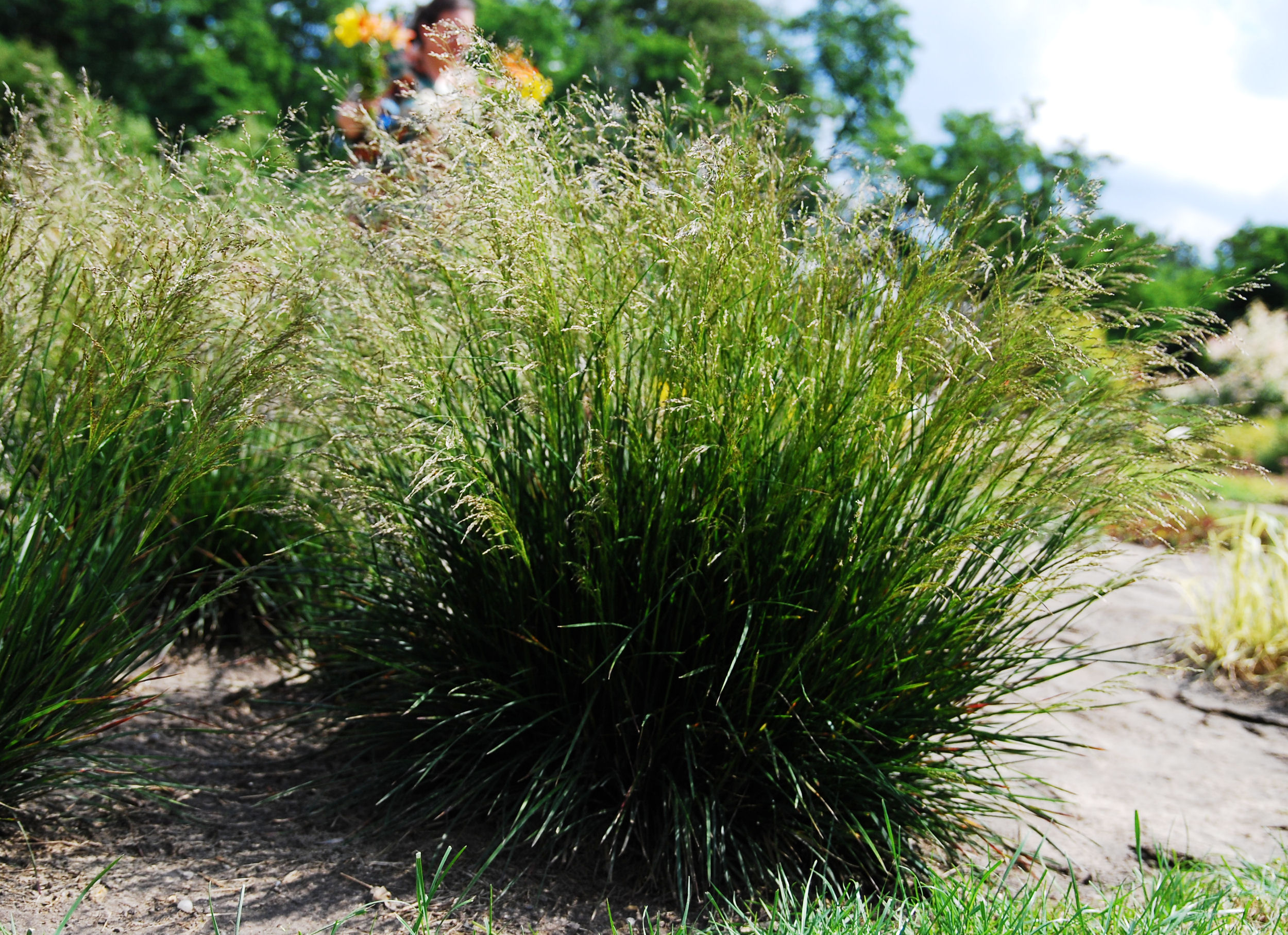
Tufted hair-grass

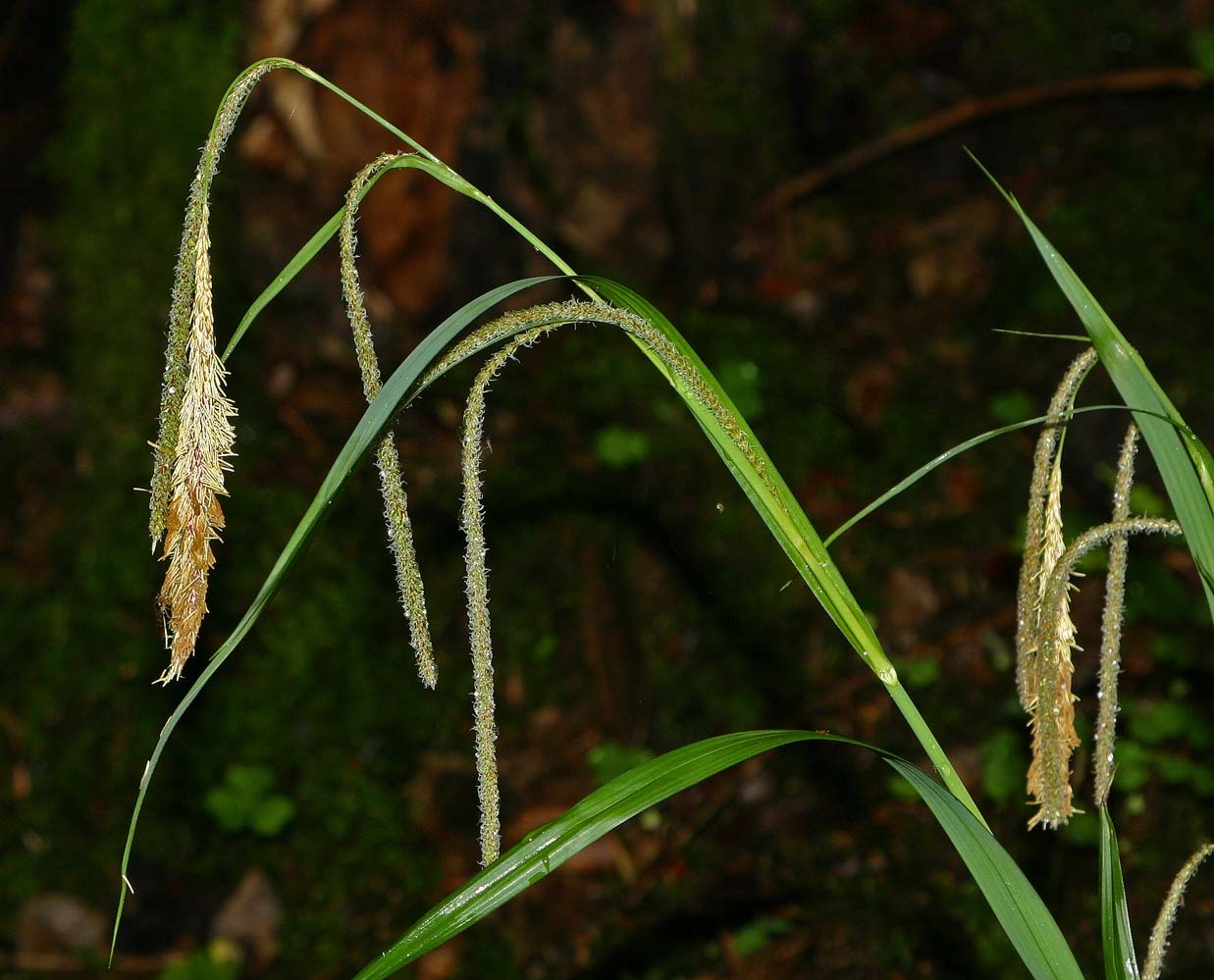
Pendulous sedge

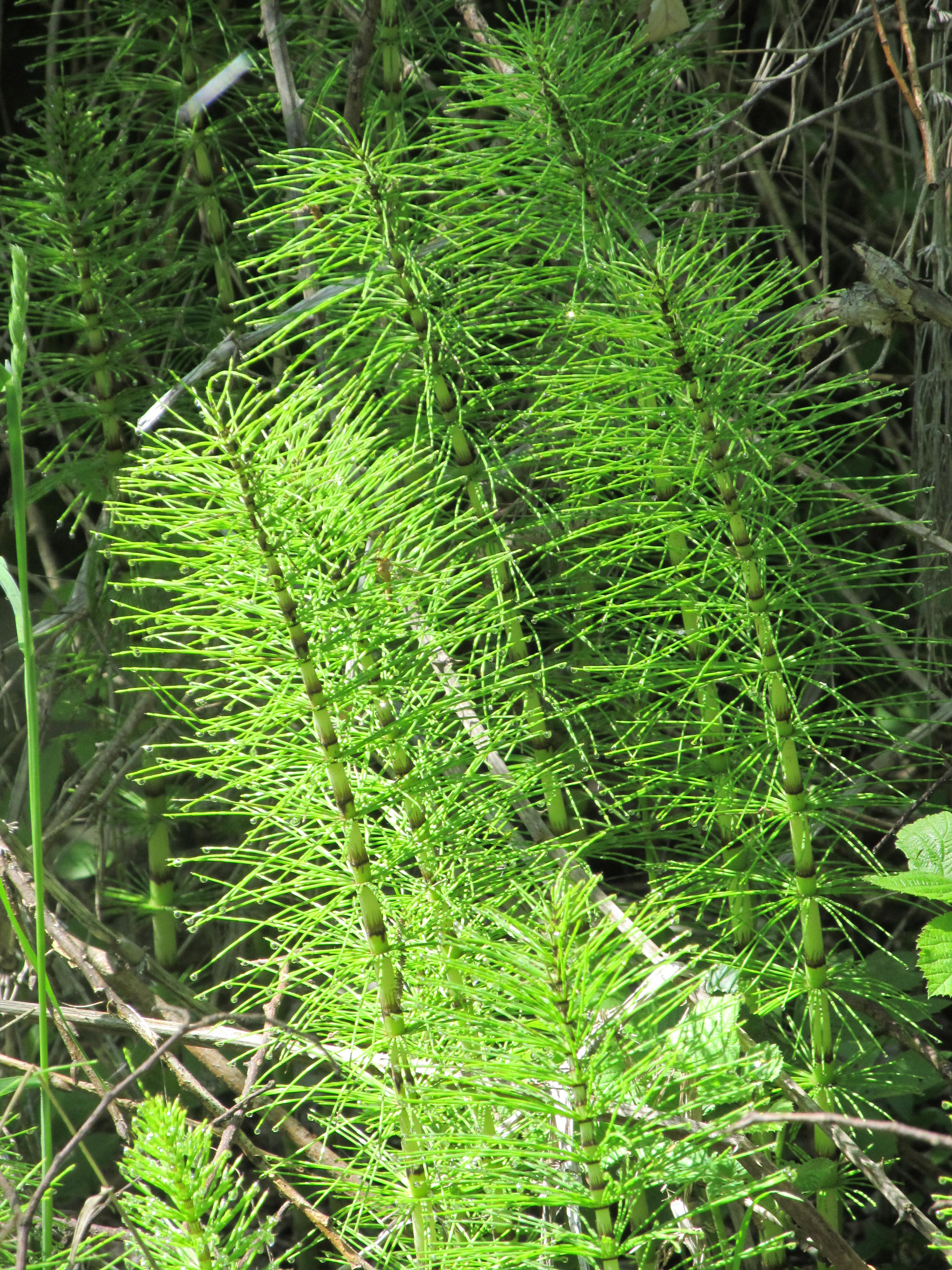
Great horsetail

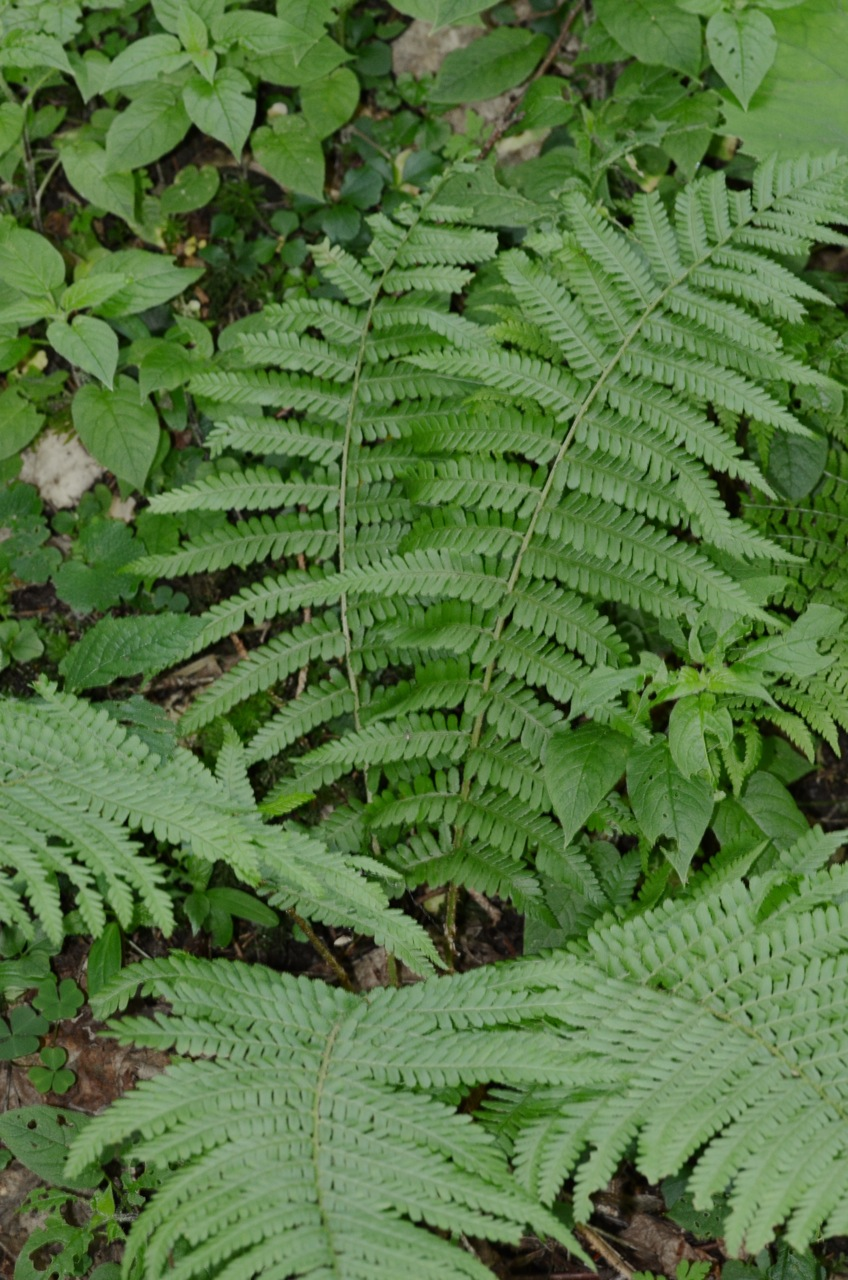
Male fern

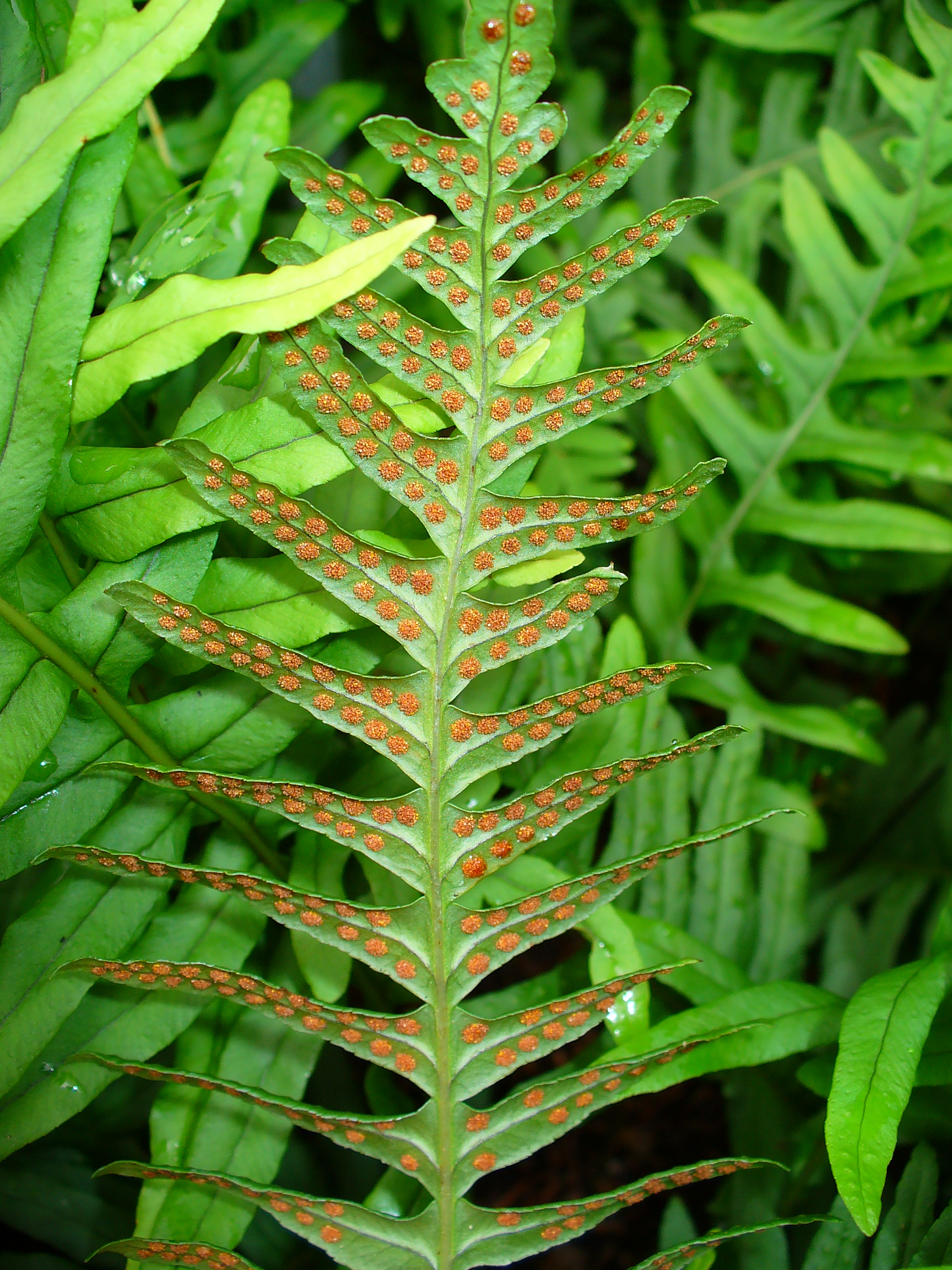
polypody

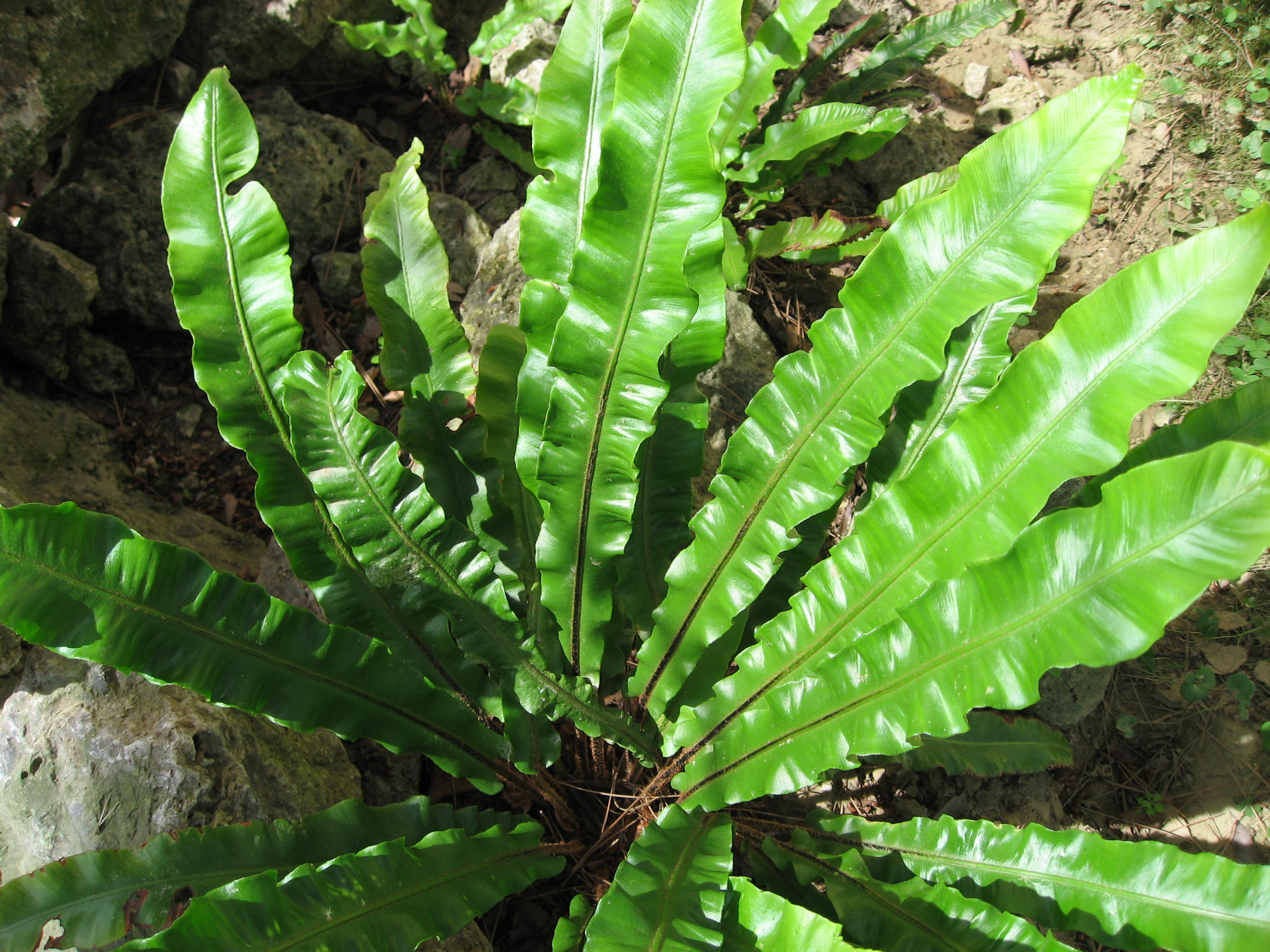
Hart's tongue

In the northern part of the site, many wych elms have been lost to Dutch elm disease, leaving clearings full of rose bay willowherb, bramble and bracken. The southern end is more fortunate in having wood fescue (Festuca altissima) "which has a very local distribution in Great Britain." The wood fescue grows on cliff faces above the River Ure. In the woods nearby are many small-leaved lime, some of which has regenerated from 18th century plantings.

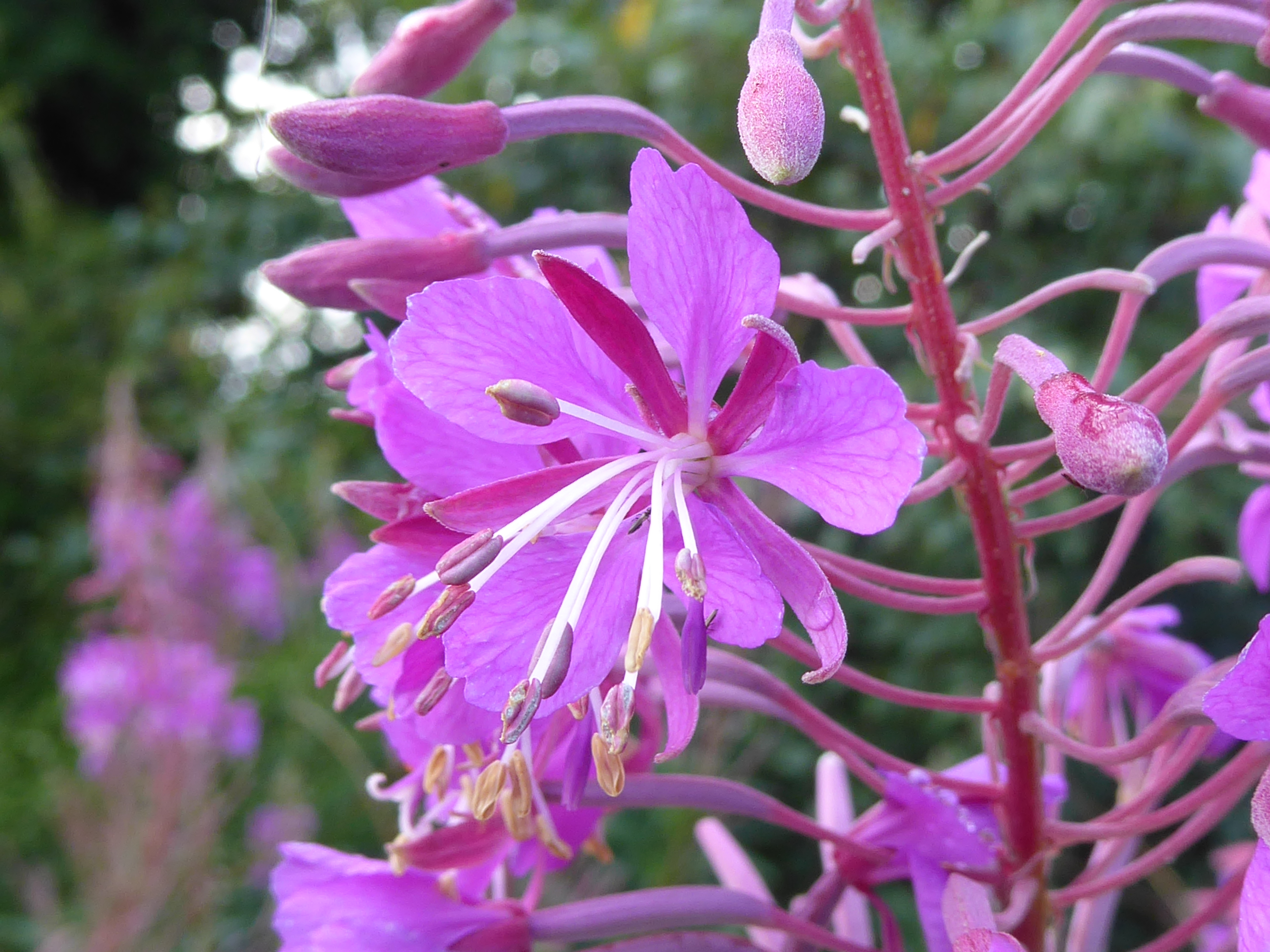
Rose bay willowherb

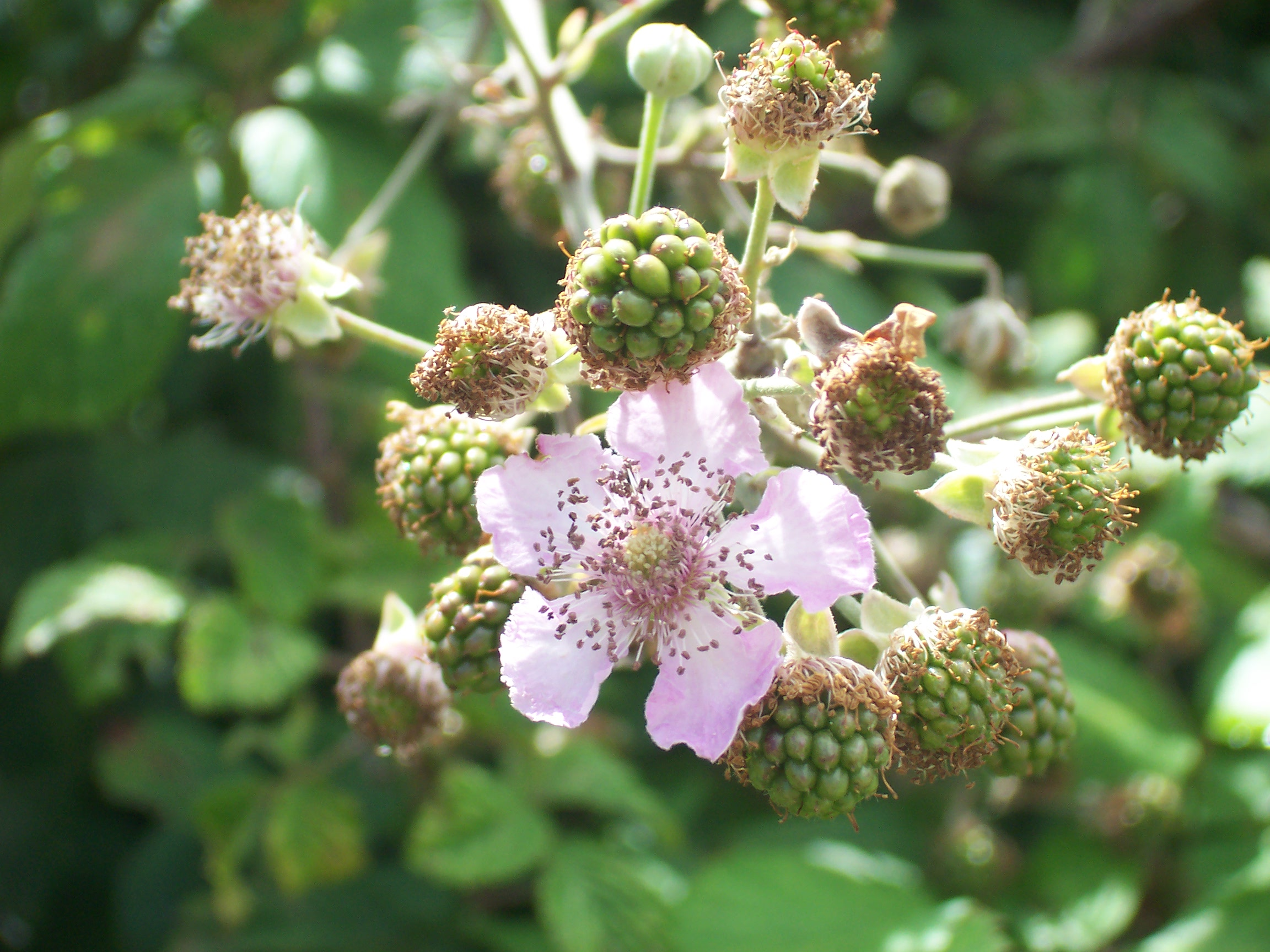
Bramble

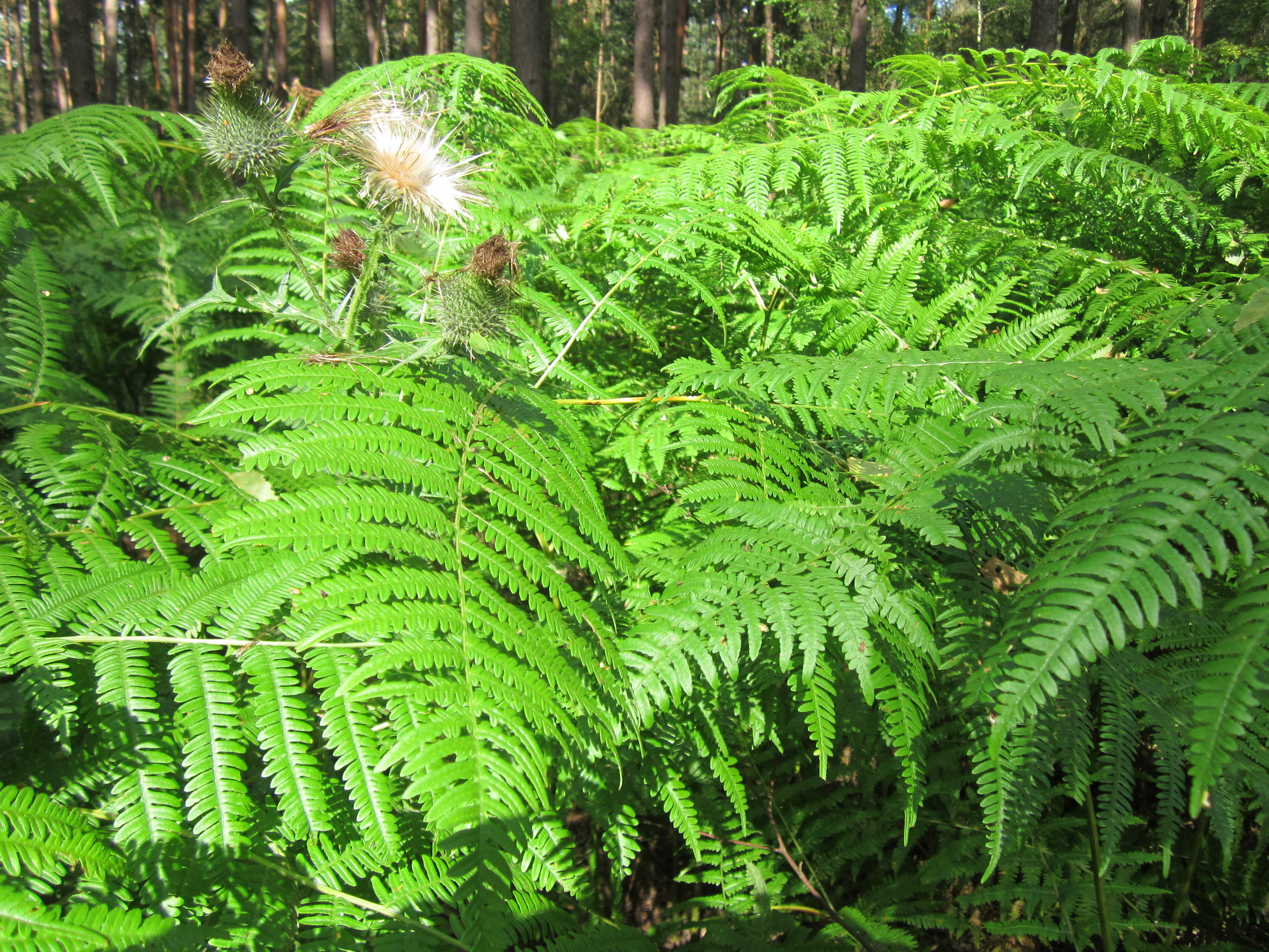
Bracken

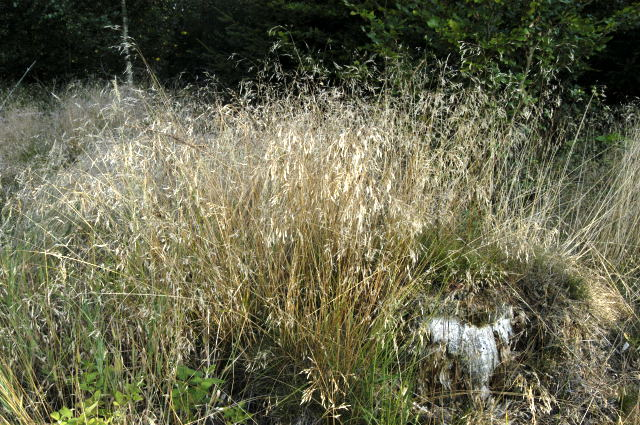
Wood fescue (Festuca altissima)

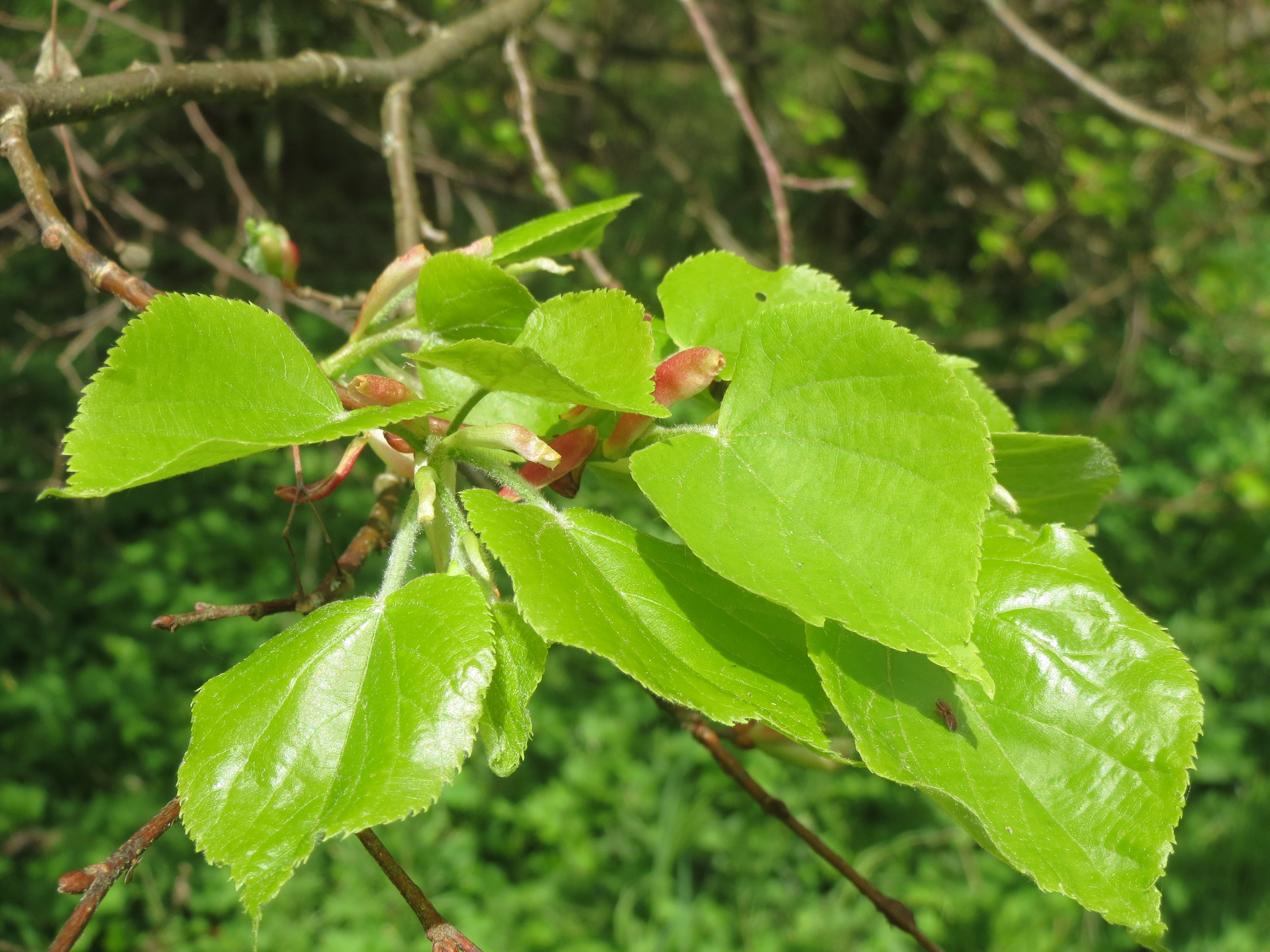
Small-leaved lime

=== Fauna ===
The site supports a large variety of birds. Beside the river, common sandpiper, grey wagtail, dipper, kingfisher, and even osprey, have been reported. In the woods are lesser spotted woodpecker, green woodpecker, great spotted woodpecker, wood warbler, nuthatch, chiffchaff, treecreeper and buzzard. The Harrogate and District Naturalist's Society (HDNS) recorded 24 bird species here in March 2017, including mallard, sparrowhawk, grey wagtail, wren, robin, song thrush, blackbird, chiffchaff, great tit, long-tailed tit, nuthatch and chaffinch.

Animals seen here are stoat, badger, red fox, brown hare, rabbit, grey squirrel, mole, roe deer, and otter. The noctule bat and pipistrelle are here, besides the common frog, which congregates seasonally at the Fountain Pond. The palmate newt, smooth newt and common toad have been seen here also.

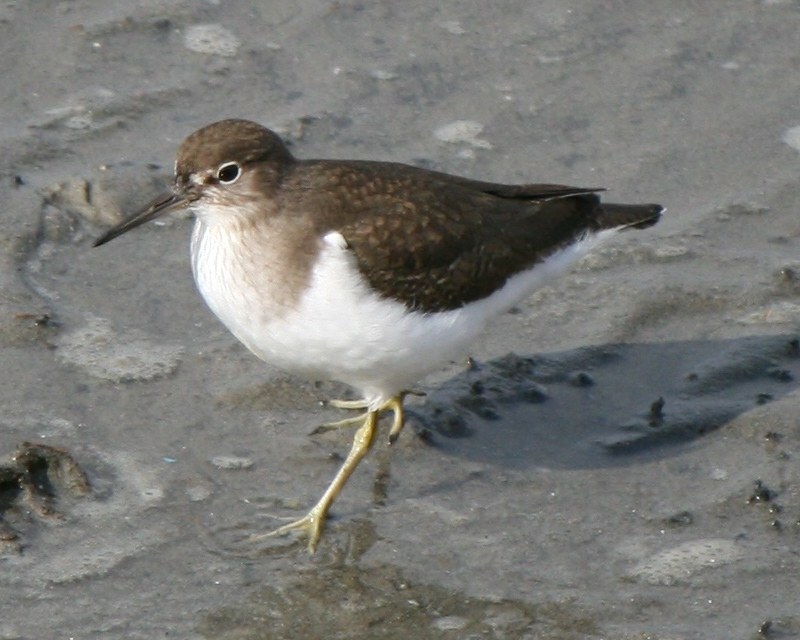
Common sandpiper

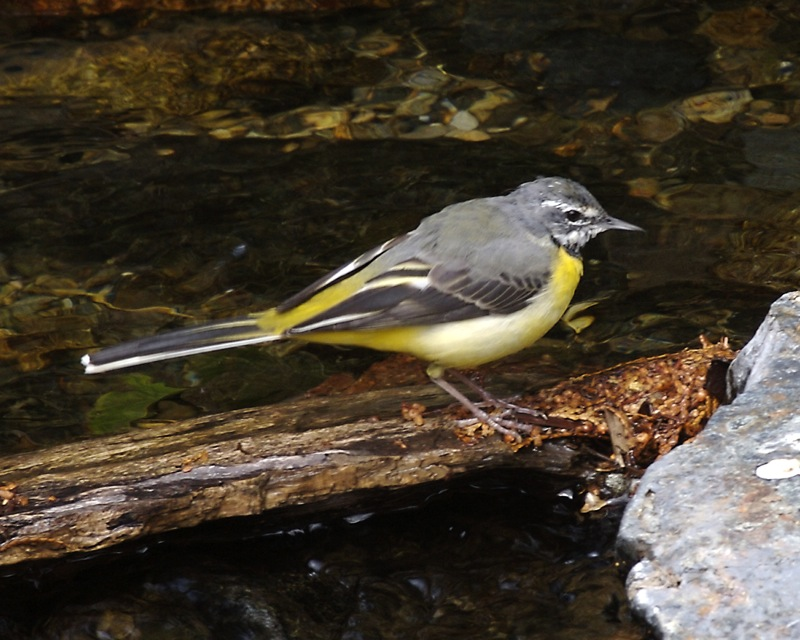
Grey wagtail

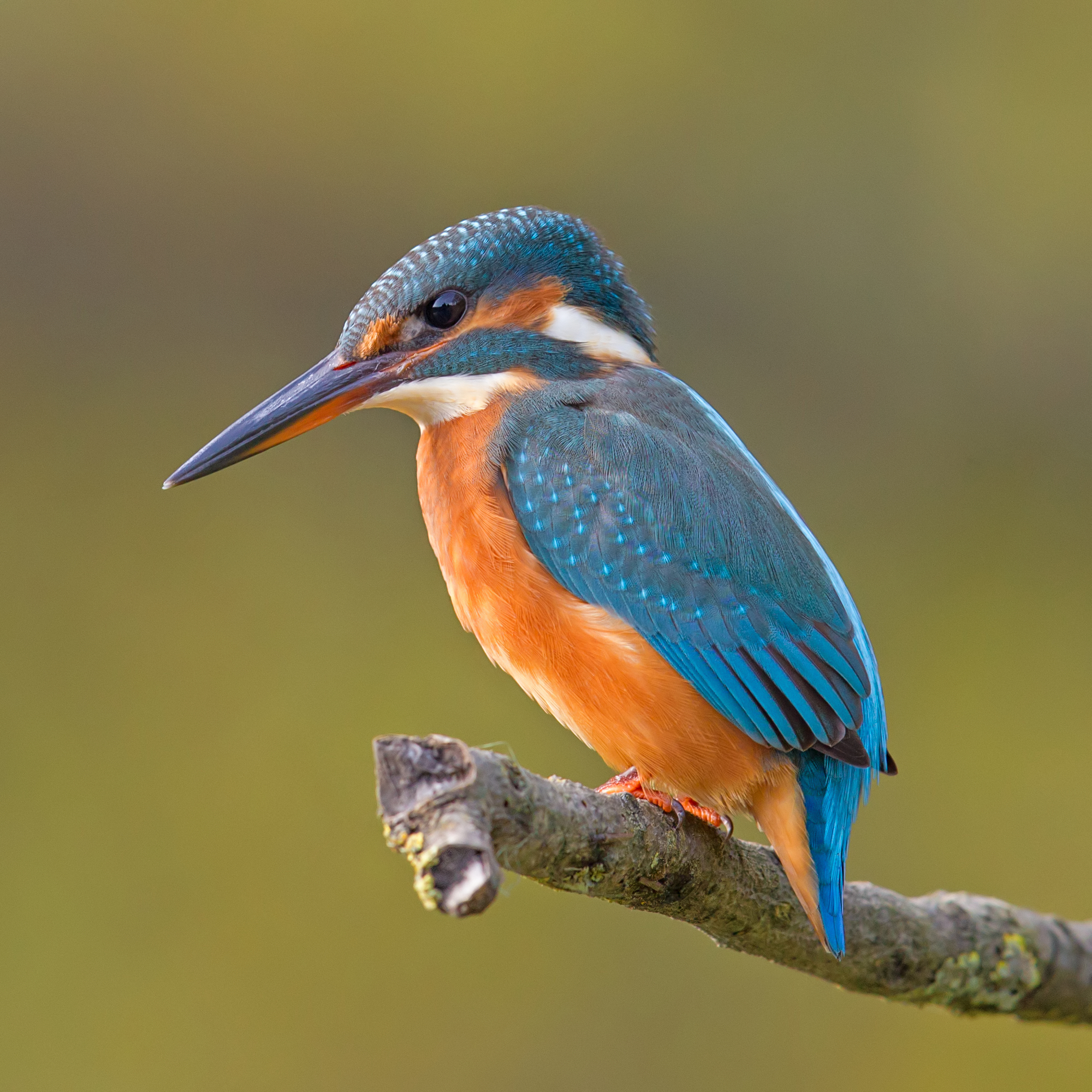
Kingfisher

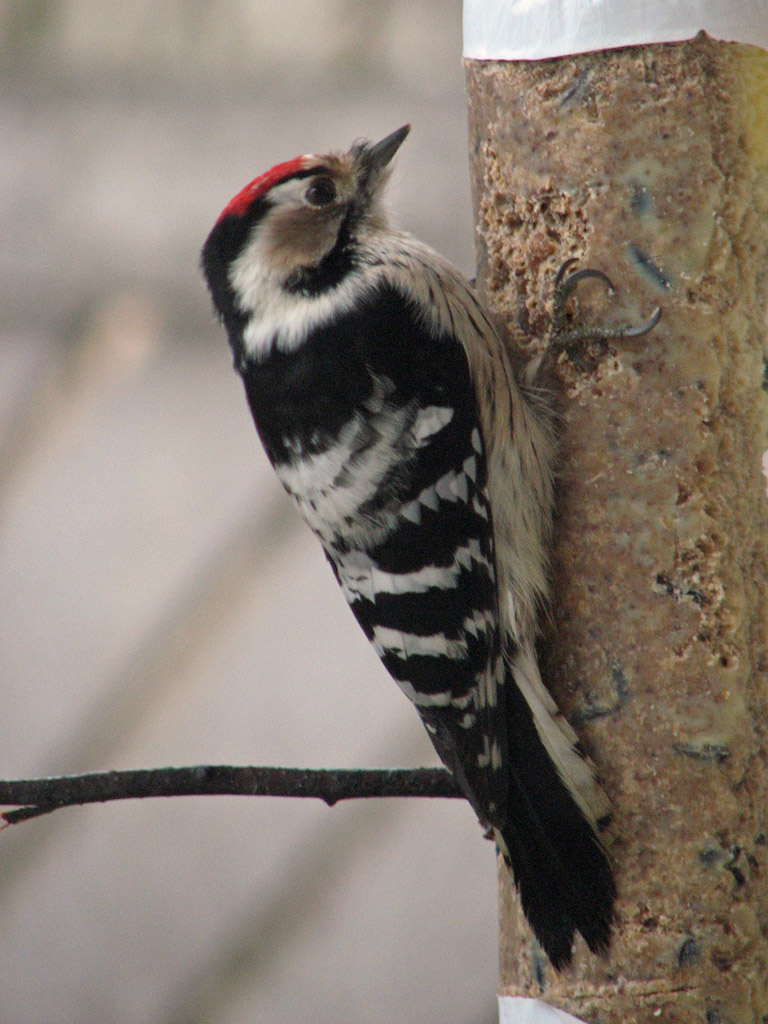
Lesser spotted woodpecker

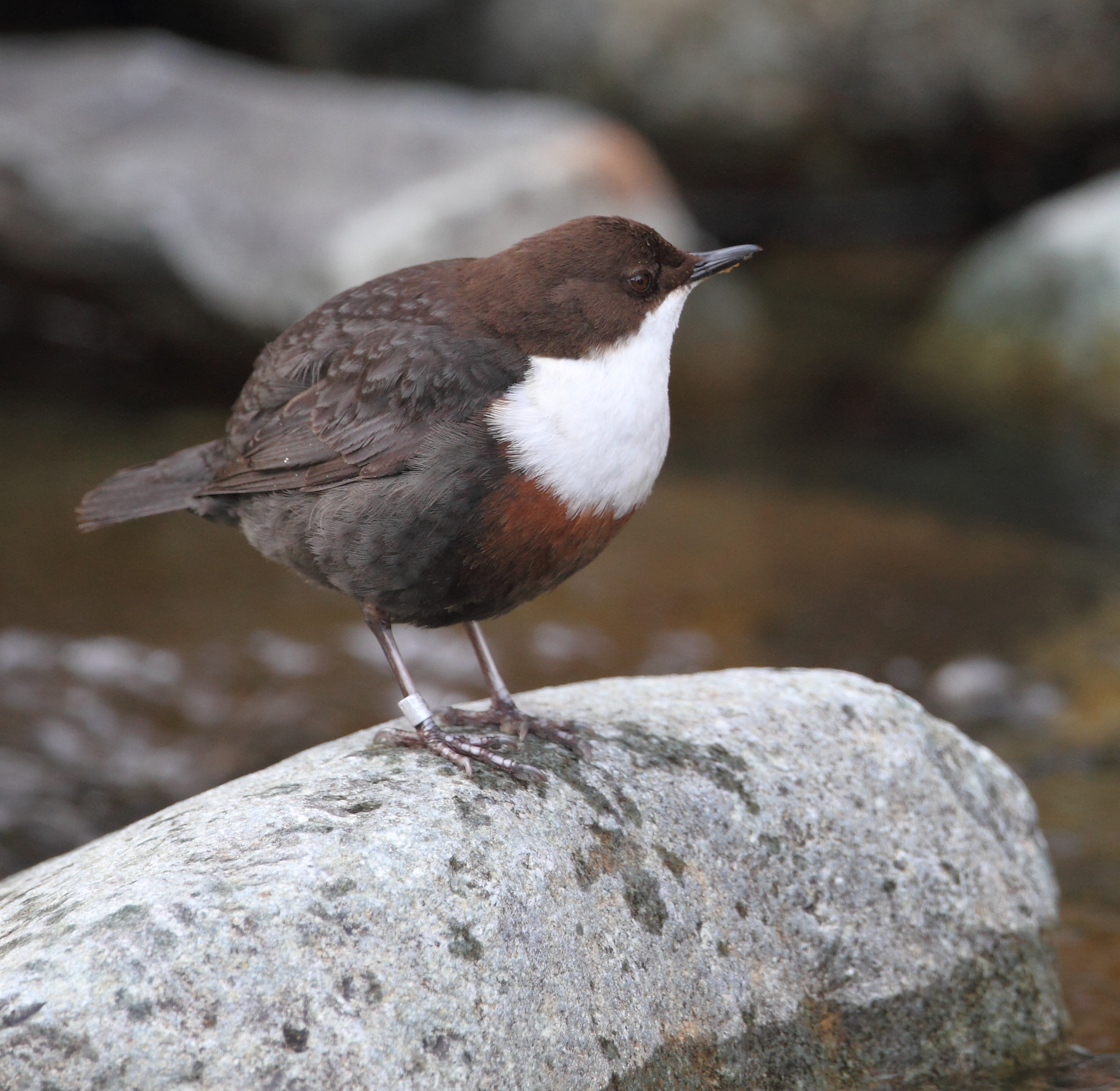
Dipper

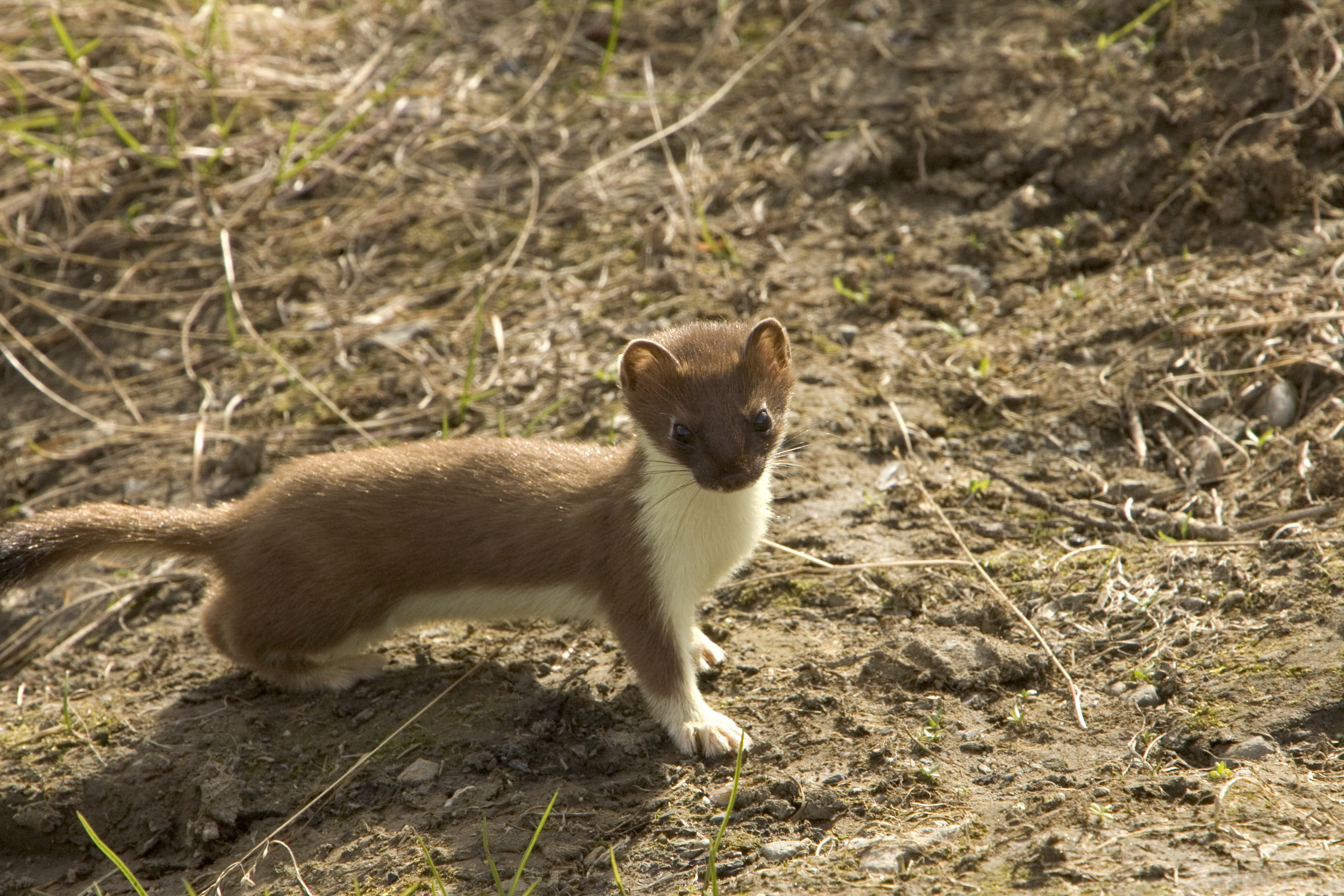
Stoat

=== Bryophytes ===
202 liverworts and mosses have been recorded here, and Harrogate and District Naturalists' Society (HDNS) recorded 24 bryophytes in March 2017, including Pseudotaxiphyllum elegans, Orthotrichum pulchellum, Thamnobryum alopecurum, Mnium hornum, Eurhynchium striatum and Orthotrichum affine.

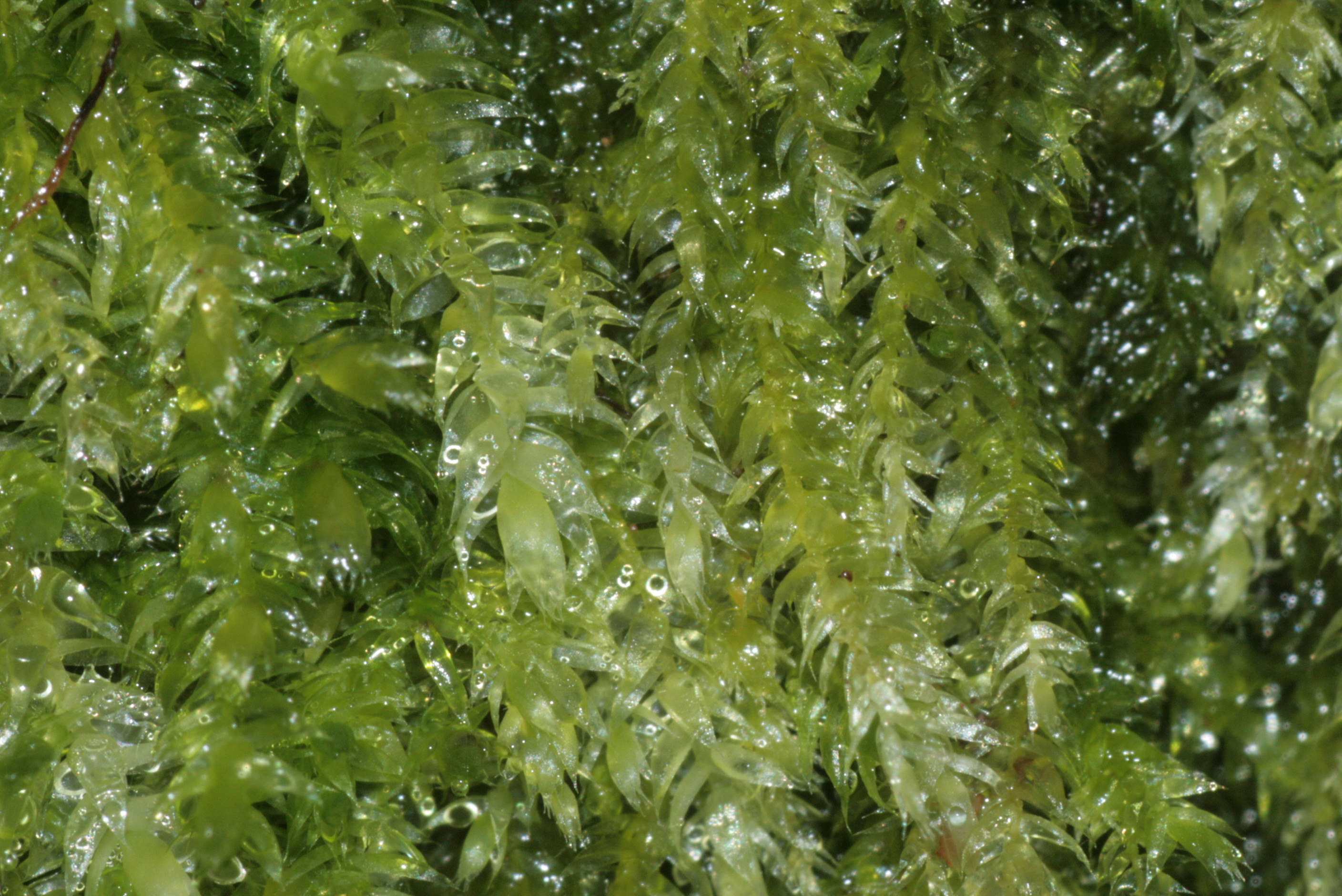
Pseudotaxiphyllum elegans

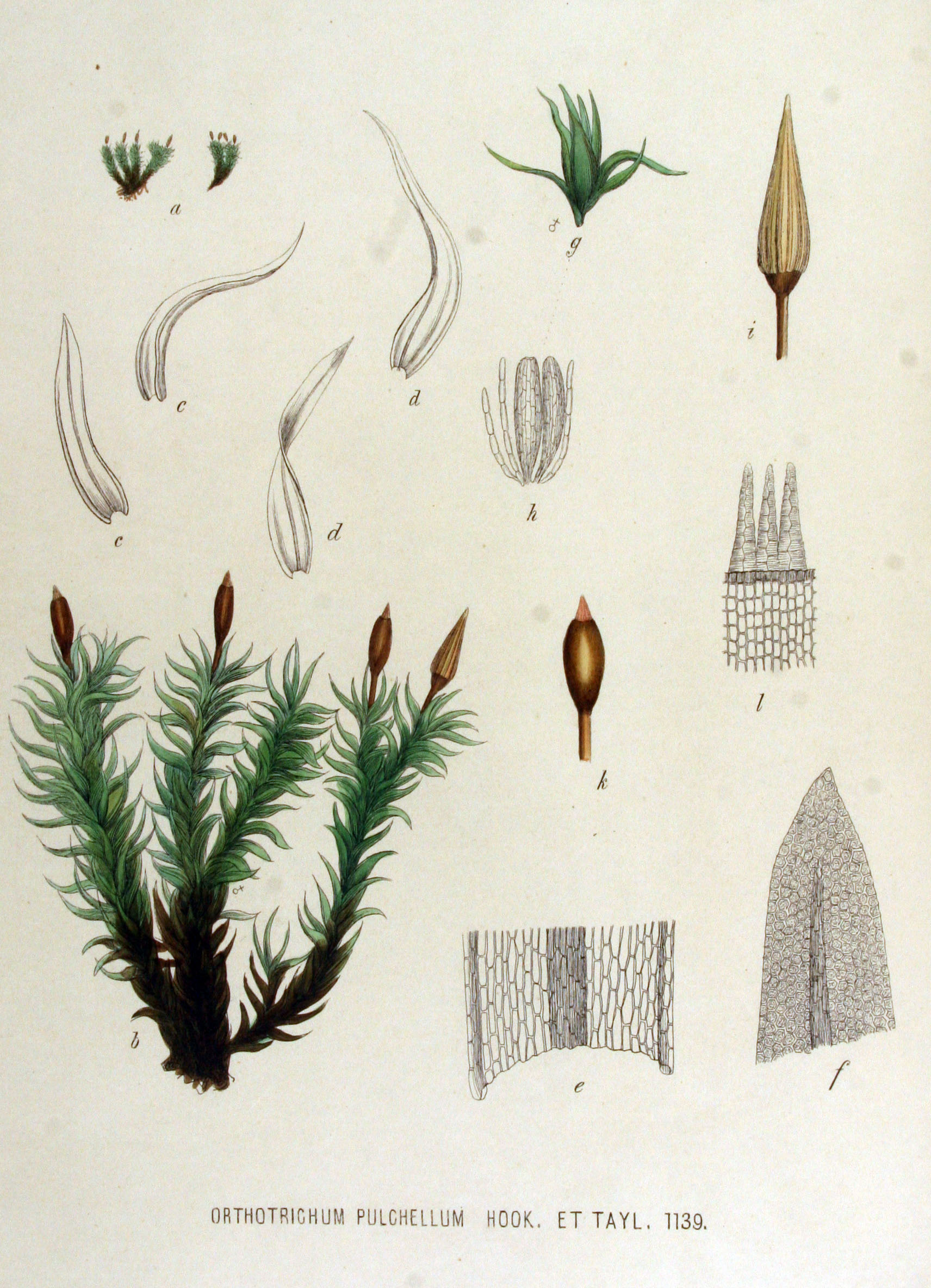
Orthotrichum pulchellum

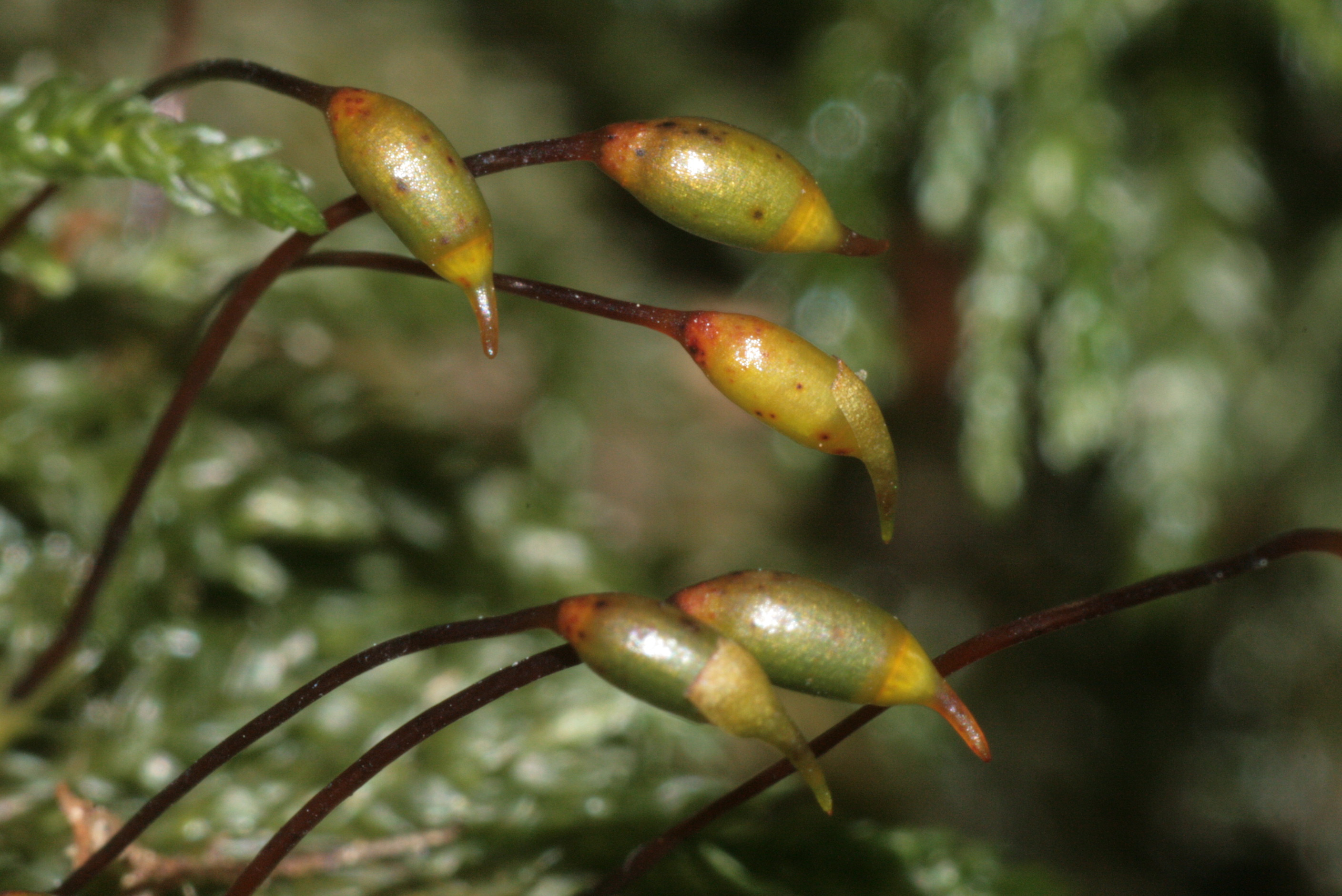
Thamnobryum alopecurum

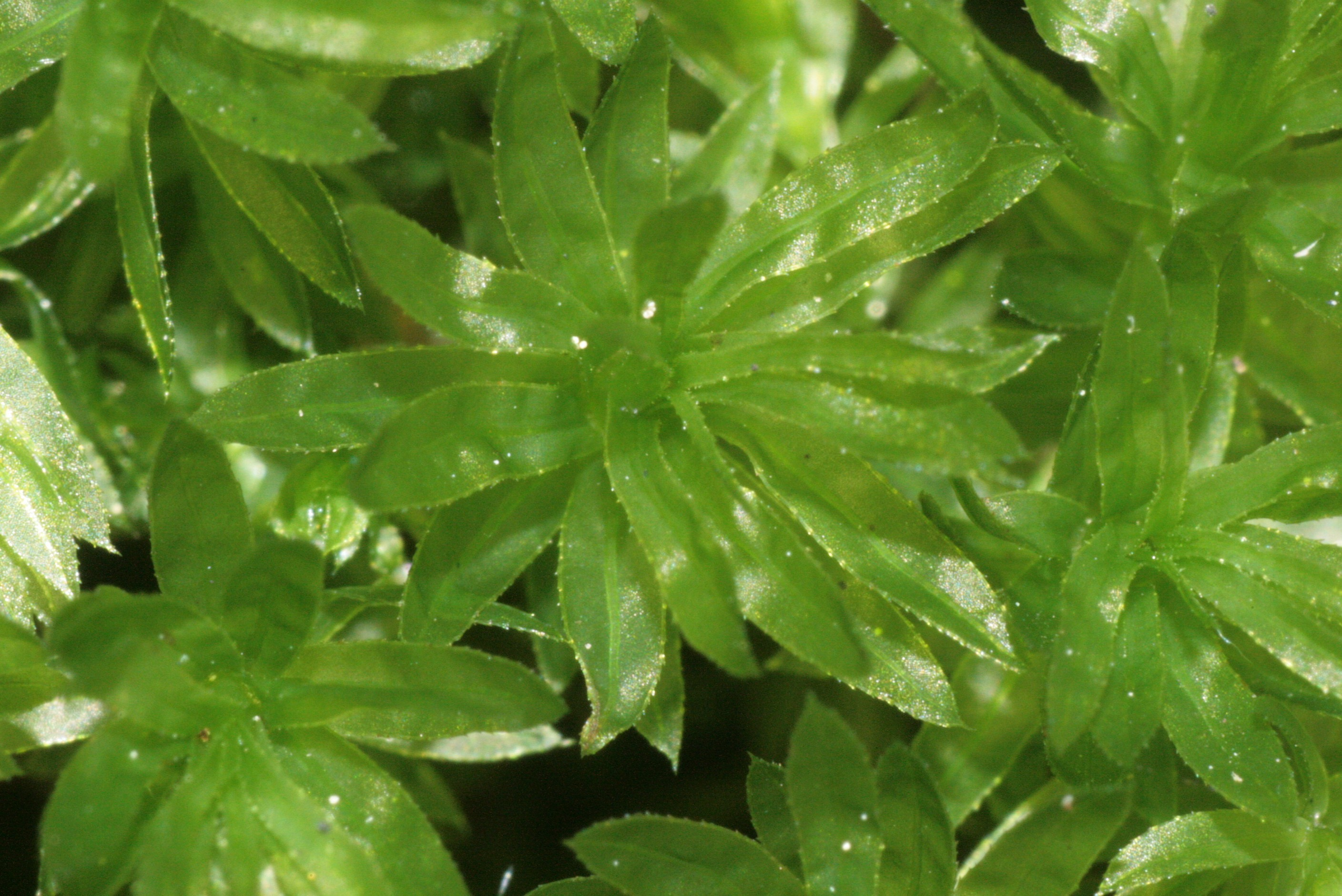
Mnium hornum

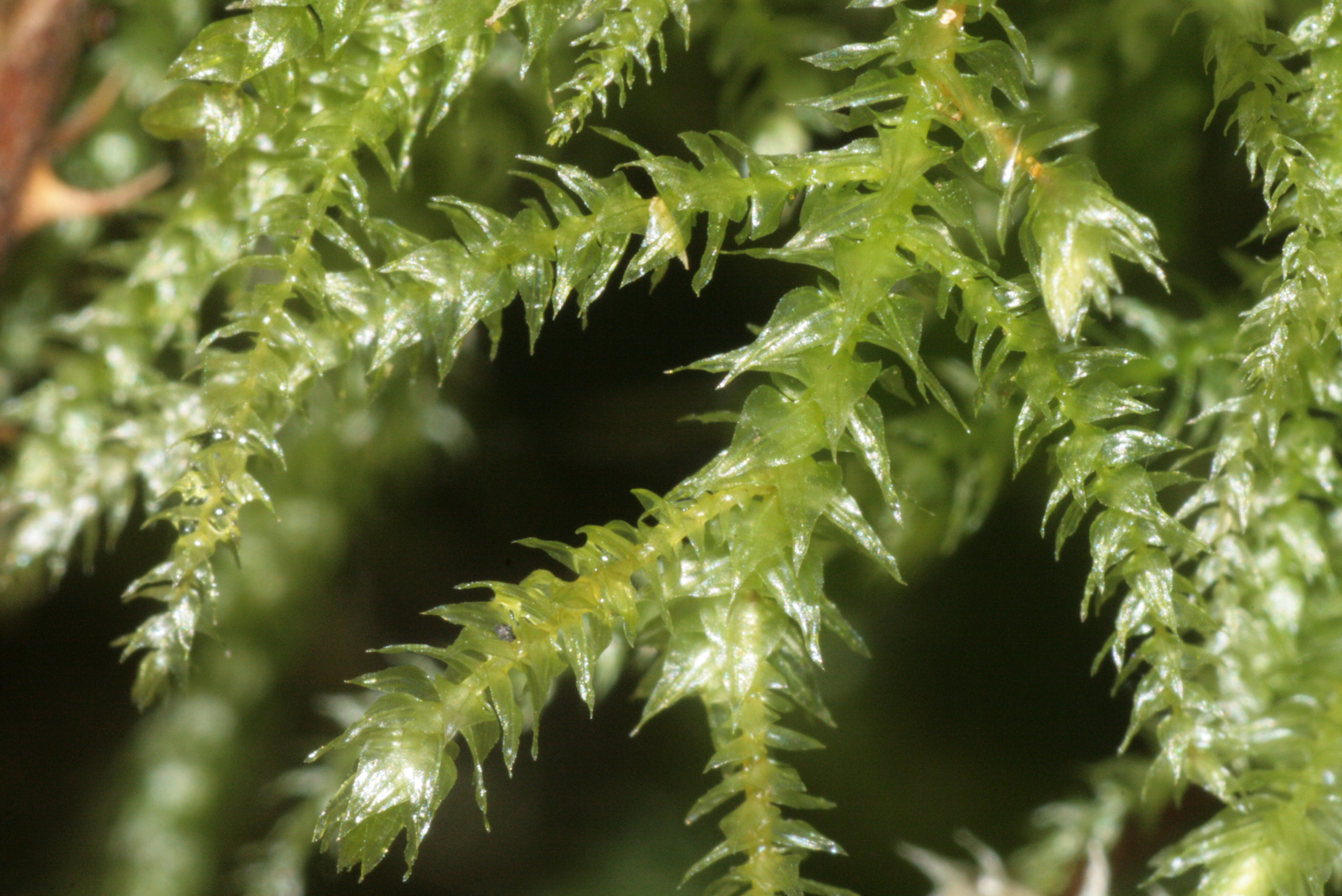
Eurhynchium striatum

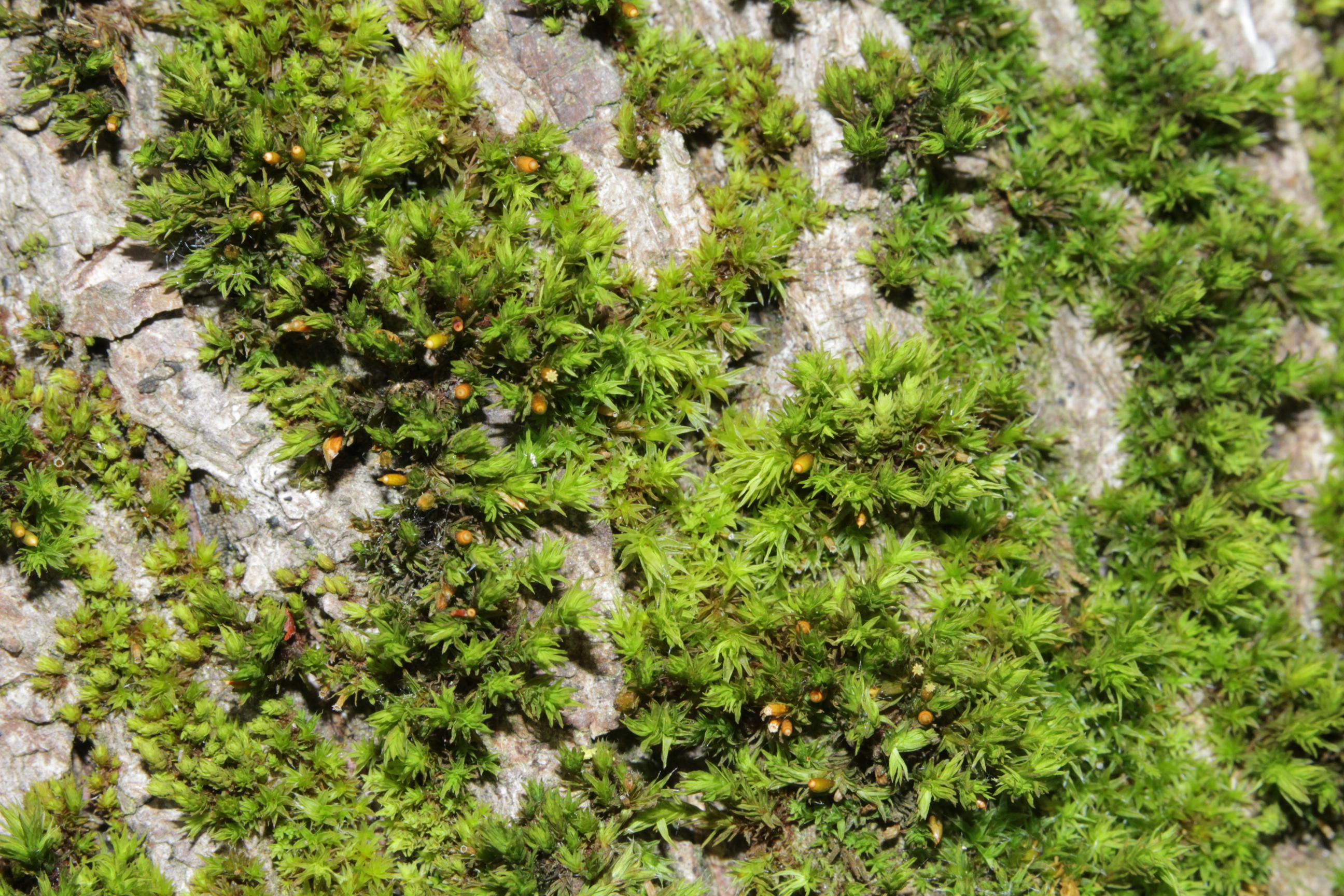
Orthotrichum affine

=== Other biota ===
Various butterflies are present, including speckled wood, orange tip and peacock. Also recorded here are the "locally rare" beetle (Platycis minutus) and the lemon slug. The lemon slug is a creature of ancient woodland which eats fungi; it has become rare as a result of loss of habitat.

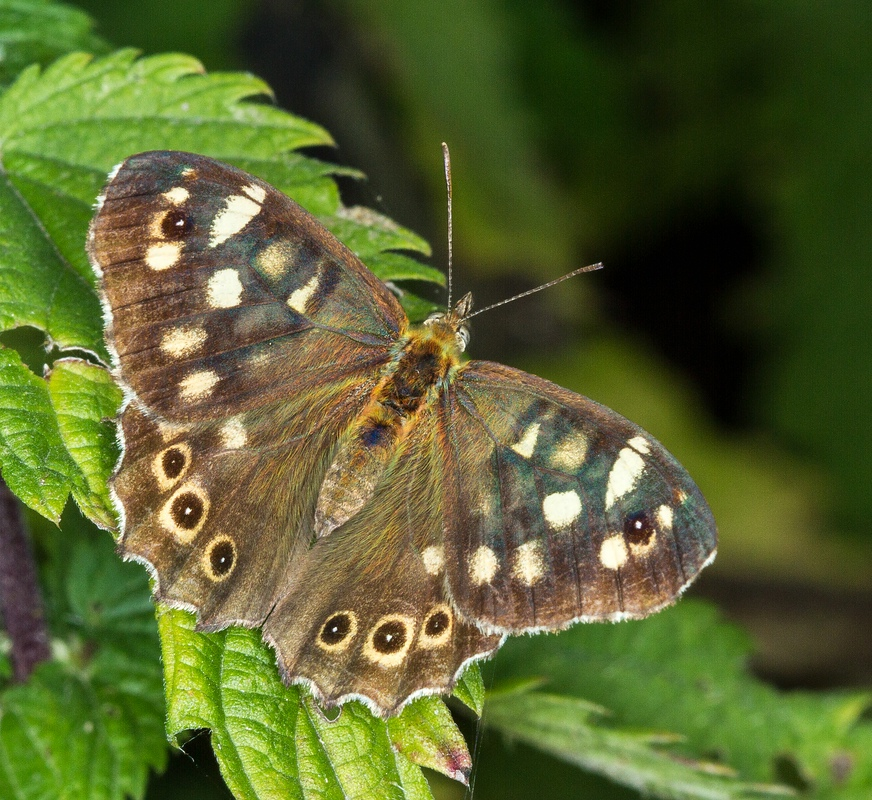
Speckled wood

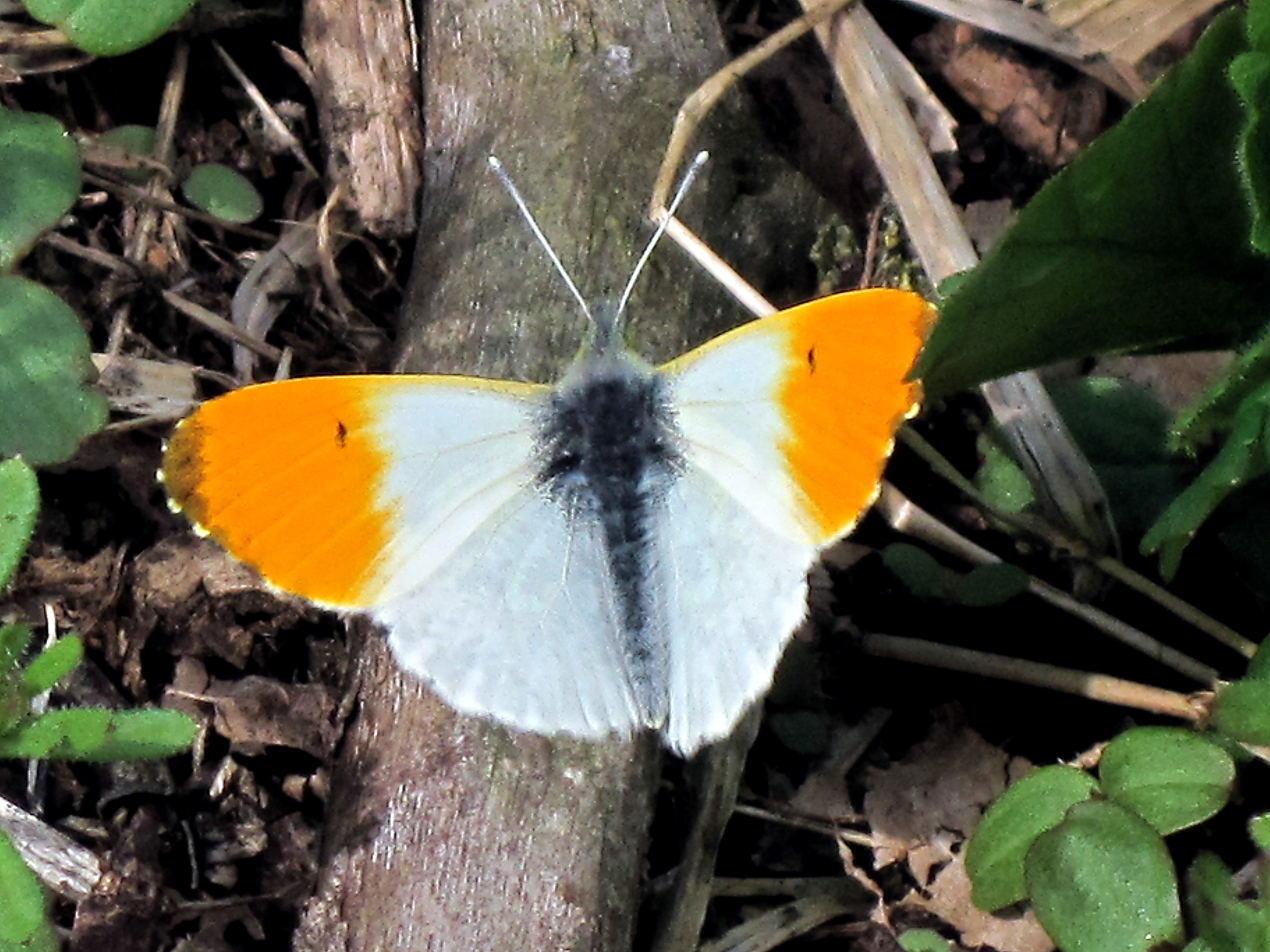
Orange tip

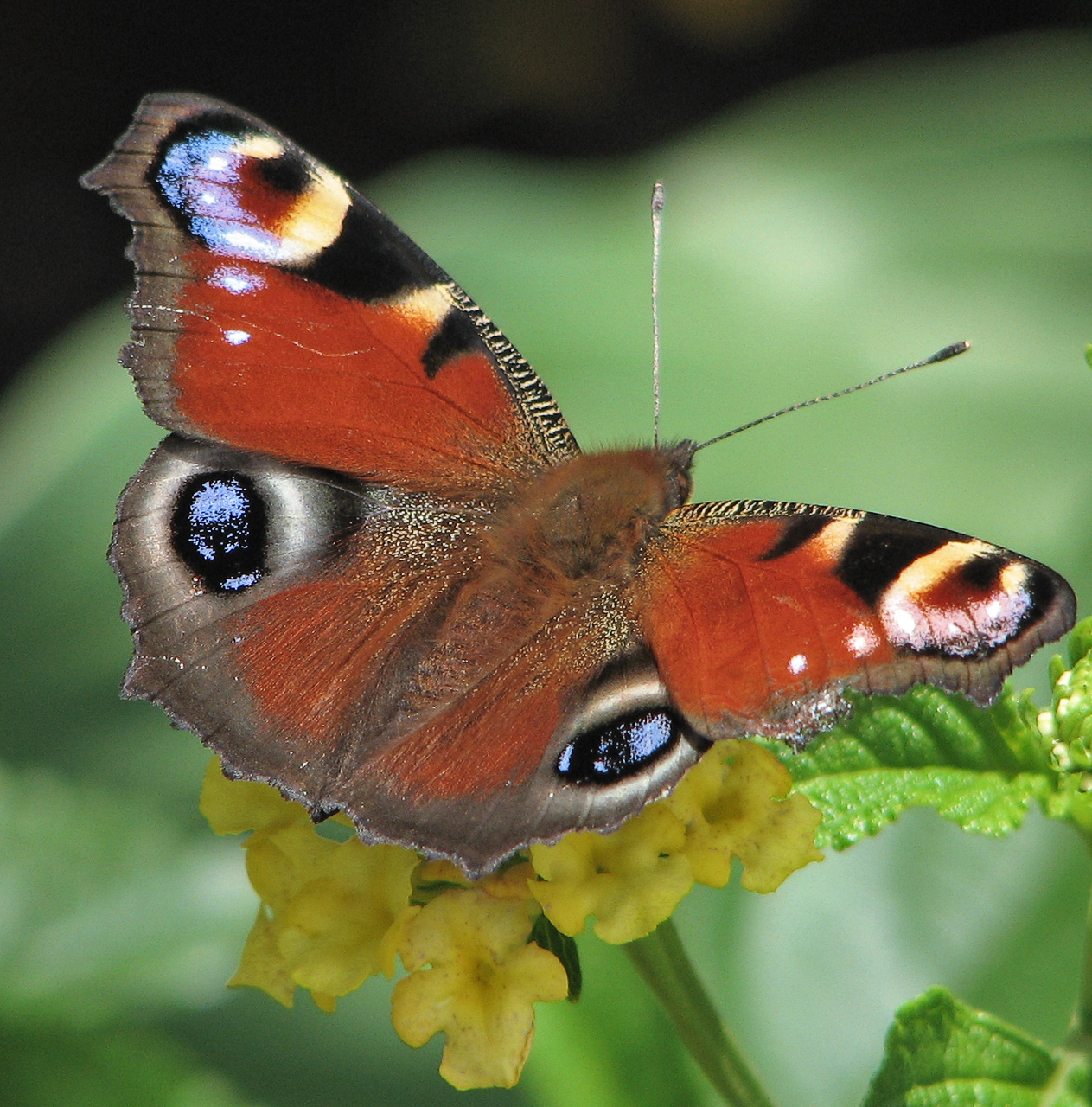
Peacock

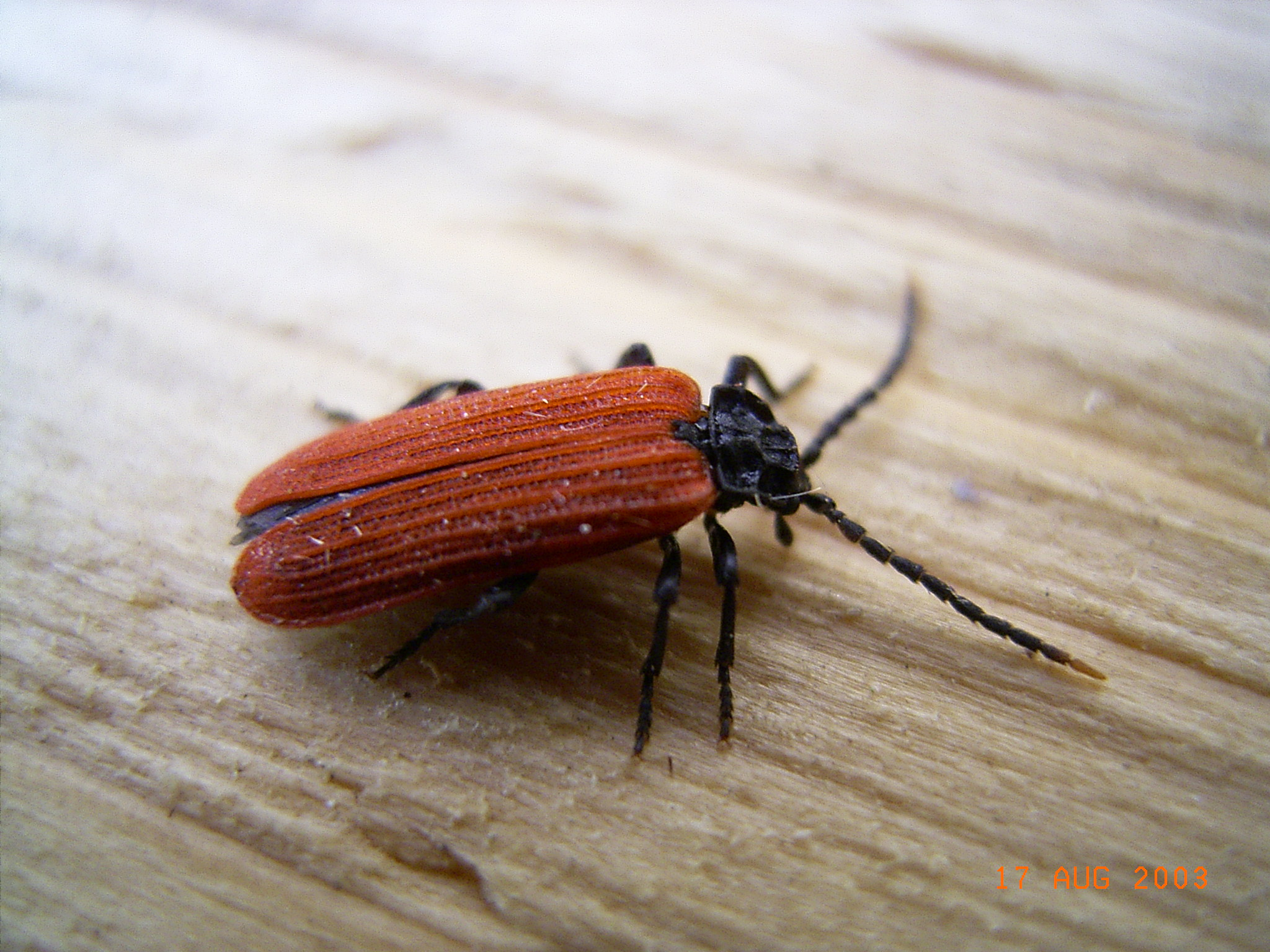
Beetle (Platycis minutus)

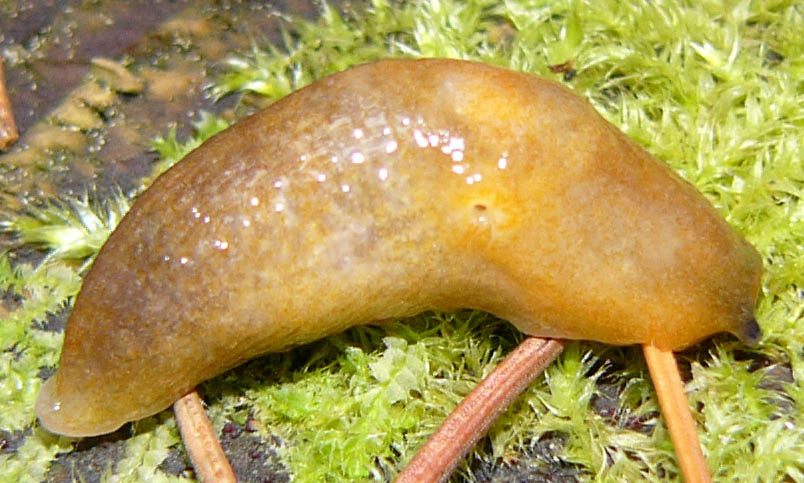
Lemon slug

== Maintenance ==
The main principles of maintenance in this case are to make sure that the woodland is appropriate for the site's history, geology and geography, that it can continue to regenerate following the clearcutting of the 1930s, and that the protected habitat and biota can be supported. This means that there should be old and young trees, and some mature trees with a thick understorey.

Dead wood is good for fungi and invertebrates, but this wood constitutes a public area, so dying trees must be made safe especially in popular places. Invertebrates and butterflies will benefit from occasional lighter man-made clearings; this may require cutting, coppicing or even felling trees. Between August and February (to avoid the breeding season), non-Indigenous trees and shrubs may be cleared, and in some areas thinning may take place to maintain variety of woodland structure. Stump re-growth and natural seed regeneration is preferable to planting, because such natural processes contribute to all woodland life. Light grazing by deer, cattle and rabbits is conducive to species diversity, but sometimes the woodland will need protection from these if they over-graze. Himalayan balsam and rhododendron should be controlled to protect the integrity of the natural woodland. Some areas of the wood should be left completely unmanaged, with fallen trees permitted to pile up, providing habitat and insect food for a variety of wildlife.

Around the calcareous tufa springs, there is specialised plant life. This plant life depends on the minerals from the springs, and the springs depend on protection of the aquifer below. Therefore, the site should be protected against commercial and agricultural water extraction or ground pollution by waste, fertiliser, herbicide and insecticide.

== Development and risk assessment ==
The whole site is covered by upland "broadleaved, mixed and yew woodland," which Natural England has measured out in two large units and one smaller unit. When the site was assessed on 28 May 2012, the first two larger units were judged to be in favourable condition. Unit One, 17.5165 hectares (0.1752 km^{2}; 0.06763 sq mi) in the north, had mature woodland with old and young trees, fallen deadwood and some sycamore but not too much. Its ground flora met with approval. Unit Two, 17.3069 hectares (0.1731 km^{2}; 0.06682 sq mi) in the centre of the site, had been in less favourable condition but was now acceptable, with varied woodland, diverse flora and sycamore whose expansion had been cut back sufficiently but still required monitoring. The report mentions issues with previous "scrubbing up of the tufa," (Note: The meaning of "scrubbing up" is unclear. It could possibly mean the grubbing up of tufa for use in building, as carried out by William Aislabie, or it could mean injudicious cleaning of tufa which may deny mineral benefit to nearby plantlife.) which had now been addressed.

The third unit, 8.1285 hectares (0.08128 km^{2}; 0.03138 sq mi) in the east, was judged "unfavourable, recovering." It was considered mostly acceptable, with "diverse ground flora," and especially wood fescue (Festuca altissima). There was plenty of bilberry above Raven Scar, which was given approval. The unfavourable assessment was due to the overwhelming amount of sycamore. There was too little regeration of plant life other than sycamore. There was no perceived immediate threat to the condition of any part of the site. Harrogate Borough Council's conservation document of 2011 provides full information on the quality of the site and public consultation obligations.

== See also ==
- Listed buildings in Grewelthorpe

There are about eight SSSIs in the Harrogate region, others being Bishop Monkton Ings, Brimham Rocks, Cow Myers, Farnham Mires, Hay-a-Park Gravel Pit, Kirk Deighton, Mar Field Fen, Quarry Moor, and Ripon Parks.
