= St John the Baptist's Church, Bishop Monkton =

Church in Bishop Monkton, North Yorkshire, England

Coordinates: 54°05′19″N 1°29′56″W

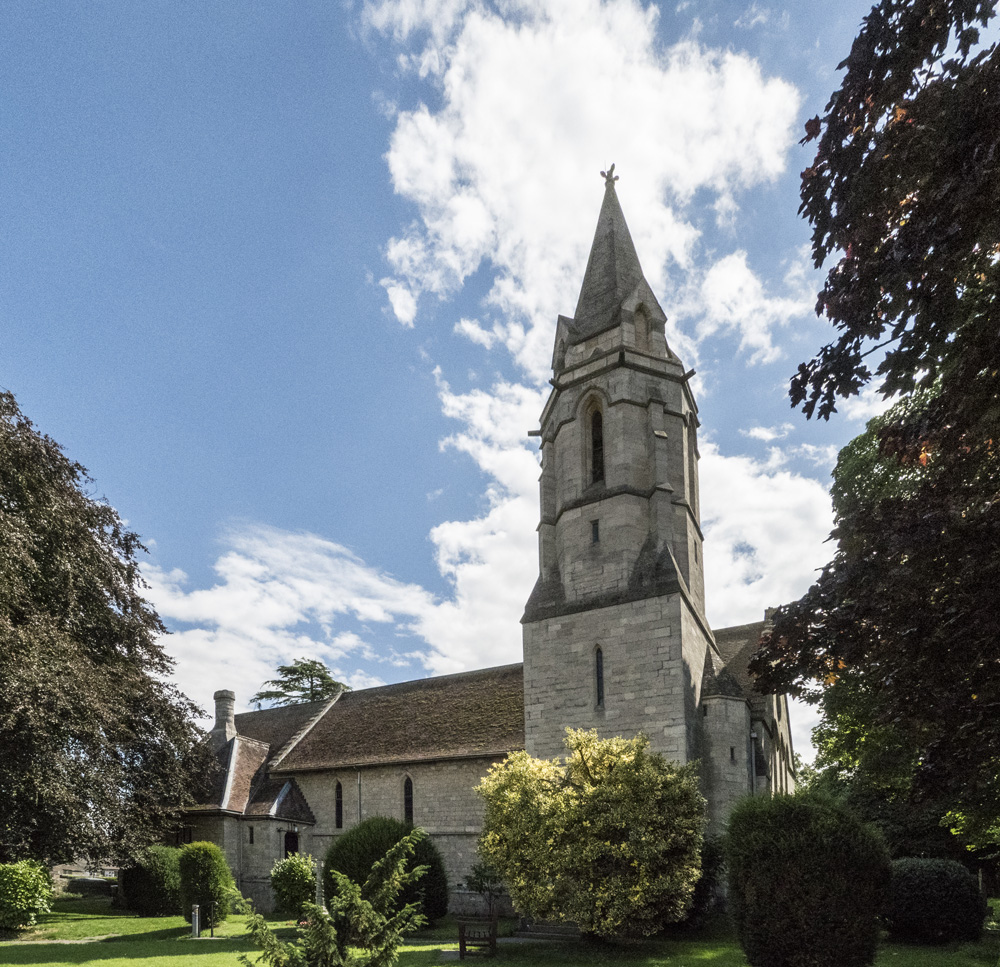
The church, in 2018

St John the Baptist's Church is the parish church of Bishop Monkton, a village in North Yorkshire, in England.

A chapel of ease was first recorded in Bishop Monkton in 1356. It was dedicated to St Michael and St Helen. It remained in use until the early 19th century, but was demolished and replaced by a new chapel, dedicated to St John the Evangelist, in 1822. This building was demolished and replaced by the current church in 1878, at a cost of £3,000. It was designed by C. Hodgson Fowler and is in the Early English Gothic style. It was Grade II listed in 1986.

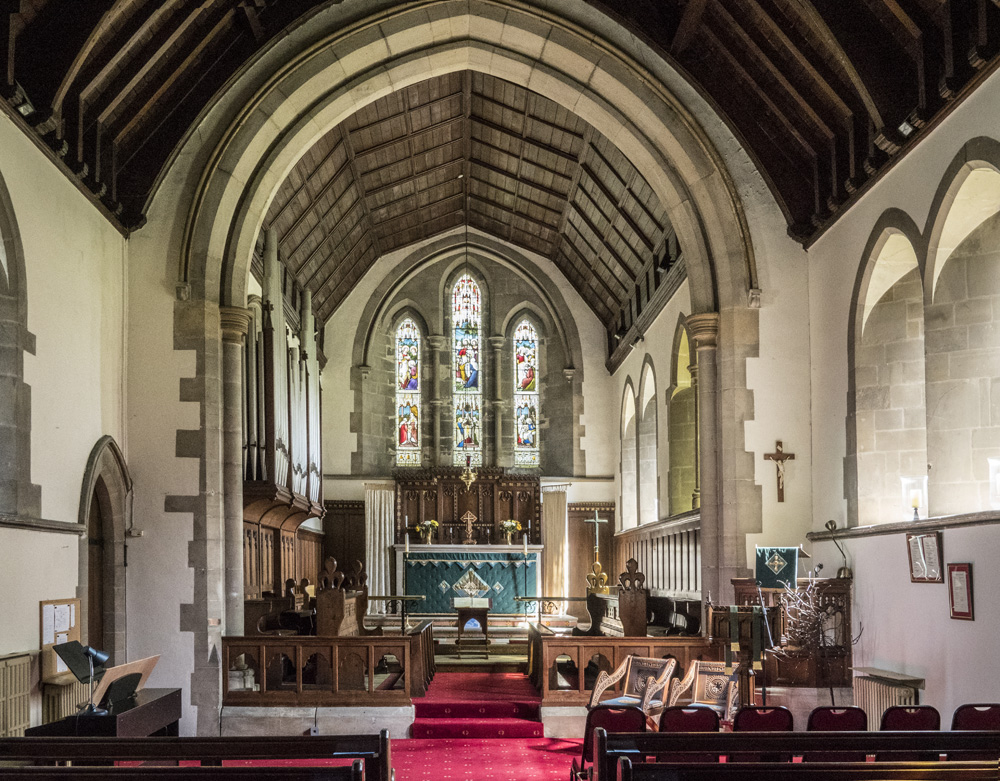
View from the nave into the chancel

The church is built of limestone, with a tiled roof. It consists of a four-bay nave and two-bay chancel, with a north west tower over the porch. The porch has a double-chamfered arch, and the tower has three stages, the upper two stages octagonal, and it is surmounted by a short spire. The windows are lancets, and at the east end are three lancets with moulding above.

== See also ==
- Listed buildings in Bishop Monkton
