= Freedoms Mill =

Mill building in Bishop Monkton, North Yorkshire, England

Coordinates: 54.0952°N 1.4933°W

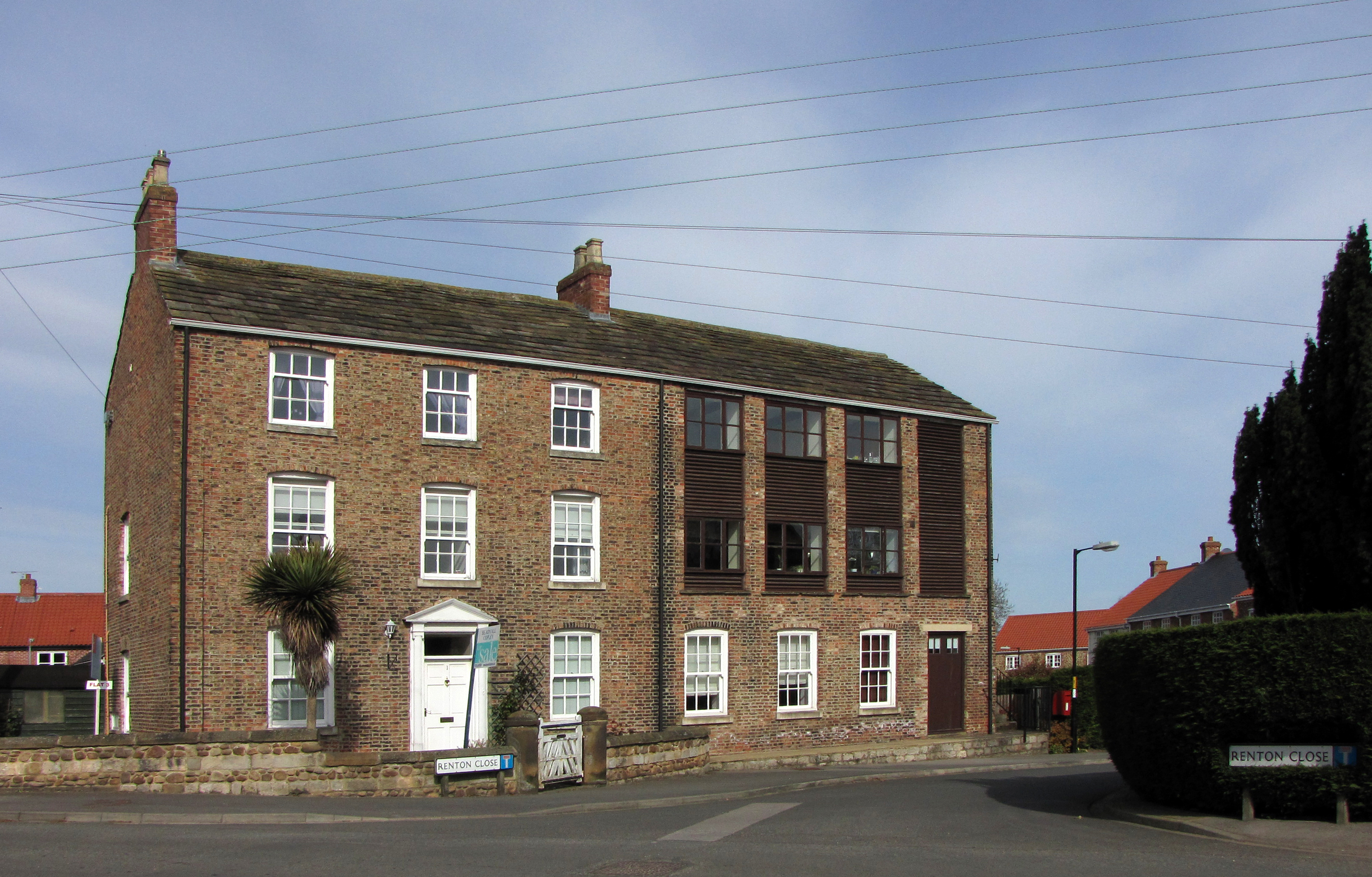
The building, in 2010

Freedoms Mill is a historic building in Bishop Monkton, a village in North Yorkshire, in England.

A flax mill operated on the site for many years, but in the late 18th century, it was rebuilt as a paper mill. As of 1800, it was owned by Peter Lomas, passing in 1815 to John Robinson, and in 1846 to Charles Lister. Lister formed a partnership with John Butterfield, who soon became sole owner, later passing the business to his son, who formed a similar partnership with Walter Renton. Other than a short period of ownership by Newby Hall, it remained in the Renton family until it closed, in 1975. It was purchased by the Industrial Paint company, but the building became derelict. In 1986, it was Grade II listed. In the mid-1990s, the building was converted into six apartments.

The brick building consists of a house on the left, and the former watermill on the right. It is three storeys high, and has a slate roof. The house has three bays, and a central doorway with attached columns, a fanlight, and a corniced pediment. The ground and middle floor windows are sashes with cambered heads, and in the top floor are one sash and two casement windows. The former mill has four bays, a doorway in the right bay, one sash window and the other windows are casements. Between the bays in the upper floors are brick columns, which would originally have separated large windows, but in the 20th century these were infilled with brick, since replaced by wood and smaller windows.

== See also ==
- Listed buildings in Bishop Monkton
