= Listed buildings in Bishop Monkton =

Bishop Monkton is a civil parish in the county of North Yorkshire, England. It contains 13 listed buildings that are recorded in the National Heritage List for England. All the listed buildings are designated at Grade II, the lowest of the three grades, which is applied to "buildings of national importance and special interest". The parish contains the village of Bishop Monkton and the surrounding countryside. The listed buildings consist of houses and associated structures, a barn, two former mills, a milepost and a church.

== Buildings ==
Name and location	Photograph	Date	Notes
Ings Farm House; 54.09026°N 1.49708°W	—	17th century	The house is in brick on a stone plinth, with a floor band, a moulded eaves band, and a pantile roof with an eaves course of stone slate and gable copings. There are two storeys and four bays. On the front is a doorway, and the windows are sashes with flat brick arches.
Rosedene, wall, railings and gate 54.09248°N 1.49791°W	—	Early to mid 18th century	The house is rendered and has a pantile roof. There are two storeys, two bays, and a rear outshut. In the centre is a porch with cast iron columns carrying a flat roof, and a doorway with a cornice, and the windows are horizontally-sliding sashes. The wall flanking the forecourt is rendered, it is about 1.5 metres (4 ft 11 in) high, and ramped up to the house. On the corners are square piers with banded and rounded caps, across the front are railings on a stone plinth; the railings and gate have round-section bars with floriate finials.
The Cottage and Dennison Cottage; 54.09094°N 1.49730°W	—	Early to mid 18th century	A house divided into two, it is rendered, with a floor band, dentilled eaves and a pantile roof. There are two storeys and four bays. Each part has a doorway in a wooden porch, flanked by horizontally-sliding sash windows in architraves. In the centre of the ground floor is a small single-light window, and the upper floor windows are casements in architraves.
Burngarth; 54.09190°N 1.49757°W	—	Mid 18th century	The house is rendered, and has a pantile roof with gable coping. There are two storeys, a main range of three bays, and a recessed two-storey single-bay to the right, the lower storey projecting. On the front is a rustic porch, and the windows are horizontally-sliding sashes in architraves.
Village Farmhouse; 54.09226°N 1.49909°W		Mid 18th century	The house is built with cobbles on the ground floor and brick in the upper floor, and has limestone quoins, dentilled eaves and a tile roof. There are two storeys and two bays. To the right is a blocked doorway with a limestone surround, and the ground floor windows have splayed lintels.
Fern House; 54.09404°N 1.49508°W	—	Mid to late 18th century	The house is in limestone and cobble, with quoins and a roof of pantile and stone slate. There are two storeys, three bays, and an added bay to the left. On the front is a blocked entrance with a surround of alternate quoins, the windows are sashes, and most of the openings have splayed lintels.
Bridge House; 54.09358°N 1.49516°W	—	Late 18th century	The house is in limestone, and has a pantile roof with two eaves course of stone slate. There are two storeys and two bays, and a single-storey single-bay extension to the right. In the centre is a doorway, the windows are horizontally-sliding sashes, and all the openings have slightly cambered arches with chevron tooling to the voussoirs.
Laurel Bank Farmhouse; 54.09238°N 1.49849°W	—	Late 18th century	The house is in limestone on the front and brick on the sides, and has a grey slate roof. There are two storeys and four bays. In the centre is a doorway, and the windows are sash windows in wooden architraves with flat arches.
The Old Corn Mill, pigsty and stable 54.09618°N 1.48605°W		Late 18th century	The former corn mill, later converted for other uses, is in limestone with a purple slate roof. There are three storeys and eleven bays. Along the front are doorways and windows, some of which are horizontally-sliding sashes. In the south gable end are two blocked round arches, one with an inserted window, and other blocked openings, including a loading door with a cambered head. Attached at right angles are two pigsties with feeding chutes, and a two-storey two-bay cart shed and stable with a hayloft above.
The Old Barn; 54.09510°N 1.48799°W		c.1800	This consists of a threshing barn and a stable with a hayloft, in stone and cobble, with a hipped stone slate roof. On the north front, facing the street, is a segmental-arched opening, slit vents, and hayloft openings. The south front has a slightly projecting barn and a recessed stable.
Old Paper Mill; 54.09518°N 1.49332°W		Late 18th to early 19th century	This consists of a house on the left, and a former mill building, later converted for residential use, on the right. They are in brick and have a stone slate roof and three storeys. The house has three bays, and a central doorway with attached columns, a fanlight, and a corniced pediment. The ground and middle floor windows are sashes with cambered heads, and in the top floor are one sash and two casement windows. The former mill has four bays, a doorway in the right bay, one sash window and the other windows are casements. Between the bays in the upper floors are brick columns between which are inserted windows.
Milepost; 54.09227°N 1.53002°W		Early 19th century	The milepost on the east side of the A61 road is in cast iron. IT has a triangular plan and a sloping top. On the sides are pointing hands, on the top is the distance to Leeds, on the left side is the distance to Harrogate, and on the right side the distance to Ripon.
St John the Baptist's Church; 54.08872°N 1.49881°W		1878–79	The church, designed by C. Hodgson Fowler in Early English style, is in magnesian limestone with tile roofs. It consists of a nave, a chancel with a north vestry, and a northwest tower incorporating a porch. The porch has a double-chamfered arch, and the tower has three stages, the upper two stages octagonal, and it is surmounted by a short spire. The windows are lancets, and at the east end are three lancets with moulding above.
