= Bishop Monkton =

Village and civil parish in North Yorkshire, England

Coordinates: 54°05′29″N 1°30′01″W

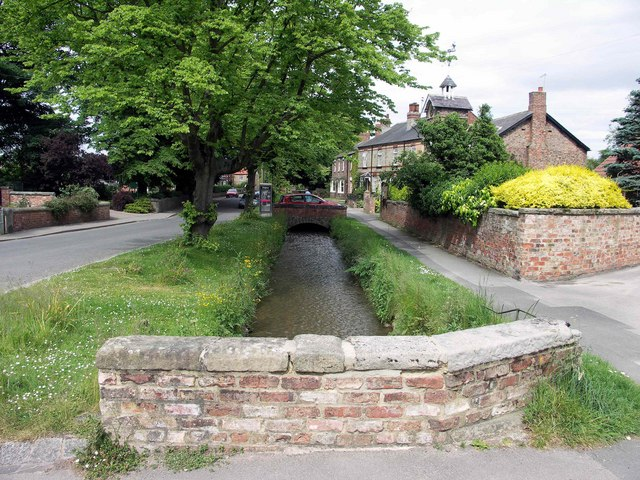
- Bishop Monkton Beck

- Location within North Yorkshire
- Population: 778 (2011 census)
- OS grid reference: SE329661
- Unitary authority: North Yorkshire
- Ceremonial county: North Yorkshire
- Region: Yorkshire and the Humber
- Country: England
- Sovereign state: United Kingdom
- Post town: HARROGATE
- Postcode district: HG3
- Dialling code: 01765
- Police: North Yorkshire
- Fire: North Yorkshire
- Ambulance: Yorkshire
- UK Parliament: Wetherby and Easingwold

Bishop Monkton is a village and civil parish in the county of North Yorkshire, England, about five miles south of Ripon. According to the 2001 census it had a population of 775, increasing slightly to 778 at the 2011 Census. In 2015, North Yorkshire County Council estimated the population to be 760.

Until 1974 it was part of the West Riding of Yorkshire. From 1974 to 2023 it was part of the Borough of Harrogate, it is now administered by the unitary North Yorkshire Council.

Main features of the village include a beck which runs through the centre of the village, St John the Baptist's Church and a Methodist church, a village hall and playing fields, a primary school, a pub and two caravan sites.

It is within easy reach of Ripon and Harrogate (via the A61); Leeds and York are both less than an hour's drive away.

Littlethorpe and Burton Leonard are the nearest villages.

== History ==
The settlement is mentioned in the Domesday Book of 1086 as belonging to the then Archbishop of York. The name Monucheton predates the survey (listed in 1030) as the Town of the monks. It is thought that 13th century, the archbishop resided in a manor house in the village, which has since been destroyed.

Freedoms Mill, standing on the site of an early flax mill, served as paper mill and has since been converted to housing. Between 1848 and 1967, there was a railway station at Wormald Green to the south-west. The nearest station now is at Knaresborough, some 6 miles (9.7 km) south.

Twentieth-century developments include a council estate built in the 1960s, and two more housing estates built at the south-eastern tip of the village. In 1986 a rural area to the east of the village, Bishop Monkton Ings, was designated a Site of Special Scientific Interest (SSSI) by Natural England. To the west of the village lies Bishop Monkton Railway Cutting Nature Reserve, which is managed by the Yorkshire Wildlife Trust.

The village has a church, St John the Baptist, a grade II listed structure that was built in 1878. The nearby primary school is also located on St John's Road and has been rated Good by Ofsted in 2006, 2009, 2013, 2018 and 2023.

Bishop Monkton Beck runs eastwards through the middle of the village on its way to the River Ure.

== Governance ==
Bishop Monkton is in the administrative area of North Yorkshire Council, and falls within the electoral division of Wathvale and Bishop Monkton. Elections were first held for the division in May 2022.

Until 2022 the parish was within an electoral ward of Bishop Monkton, which stretched to the north, south and east of the parish with a total population taken at the 2011 census of 2,842.

Until 2024 the parish was within the parliamentary constituency of Skipton and Ripon. Following the 2023 Periodic Review of Westminster constituencies it was transferred to the new constituency of Wetherby and Easingwold. The first elections for that constituency will be held on 4 July 2024.

== See also ==
- Listed buildings in Bishop Monkton
