= Bishop Monkton Ings =

Site of Special Scientific Interest in North Yorkshire, England

- Site of Special Scientific Interest
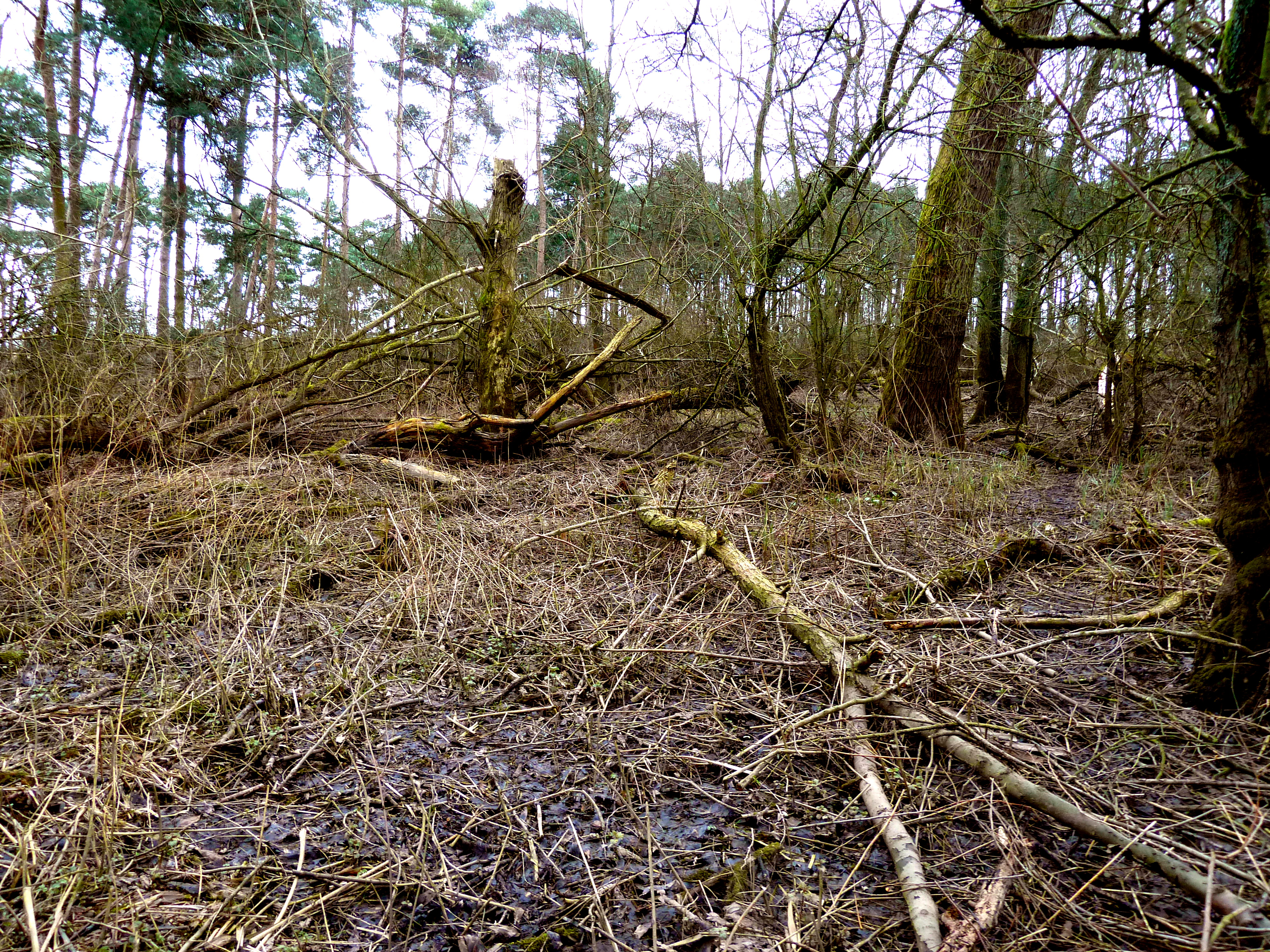
- Woodland carr in Bishop Monkton Ings

- Location within North Yorkshire
- Location of Bishop Monkton Ings.
- Area of search: North Yorkshire
- Grid reference: SE345659
- Coordinates: 54.0878°N 1.4741°W
- Interest: Biological
- Area: 37.788 hectares (0.378 km^{2}; 0.146 sq mi)
- Notification date: 1 October 1986
- Location map: Magic Map (Defra)

Bishop Monkton Ings is a Site of Special Scientific Interest, or SSSI, situated east of Bishop Monkton village in North Yorkshire, England. It consists mostly of marshy, calcareous grassland, with some broadleaved woodland, and some fen alongside the two watercourses which run through the site. This varied wetland forms a habitat for a variety of plants, including the semi-parasitic marsh lousewort (Pedicularis palustris).

== Site history ==
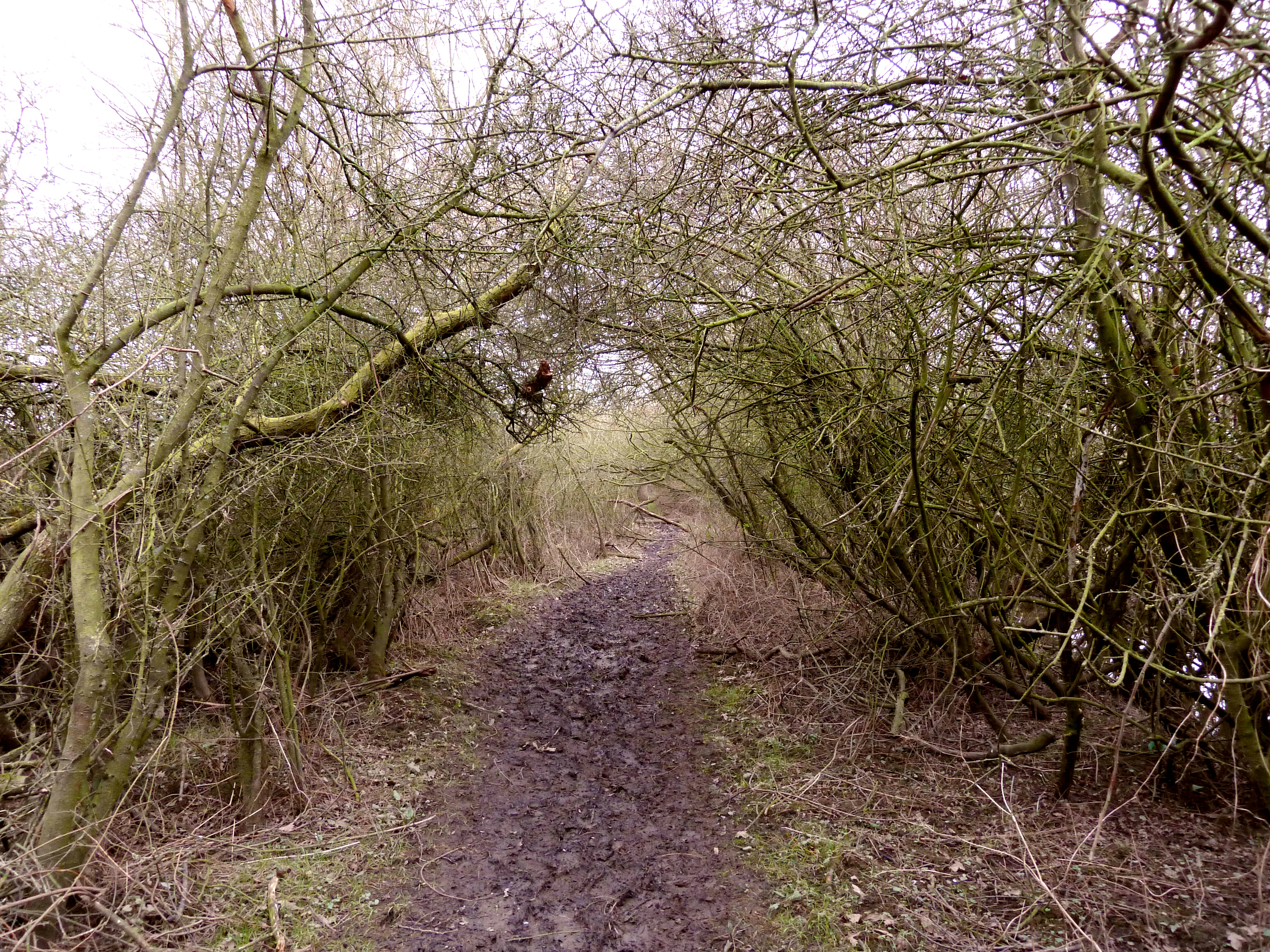
Muddy access track (Ripon Rowel walk)

(An ings is a water meadow or marsh. The word is of Norse origin, entering the English language in the Danelaw period. It appears in a number of place names in Yorkshire, Cumbria and Lincolnshire).

In 1807 the Ings, then measuring 4 acres, 1 rod, 6 poles and described as meadow, was put up for auction by the landowner William Wells. The nearby Broad Close, measuring 1 acre, 2 rods and 17 poles and also described as meadow, may have been another part of the present SSSI site. At this time the adjacent common land was undergoing enclosure, and also for sale.

Part of this site was sold in 1862 while tenanted by farmer George Heath (born ca. 1832), who was farming 132 acres with his brothers Edward and Robert. It was described as "a close of grass land called Ings Close, with a small willow garth therein, (Note: The old meaning of "garth" was a small land enclosure or river ford) situated in the ings of Bishop Monkton, and containing 3 acres and 1 rood or thereabouts."

In 1883 the Ings was sold again, while in the tenancy of Mary Heath (born ca.1821), likely a relative of George Heath who was now farming in Hunslet, Leeds. This part of the site was at that time called the Ings Field, comprising two enclosures of "rich feeding grassland" with the Ings Drain running through it. It was measured as four acres, one rod and five poles.

== Site location and designation ==
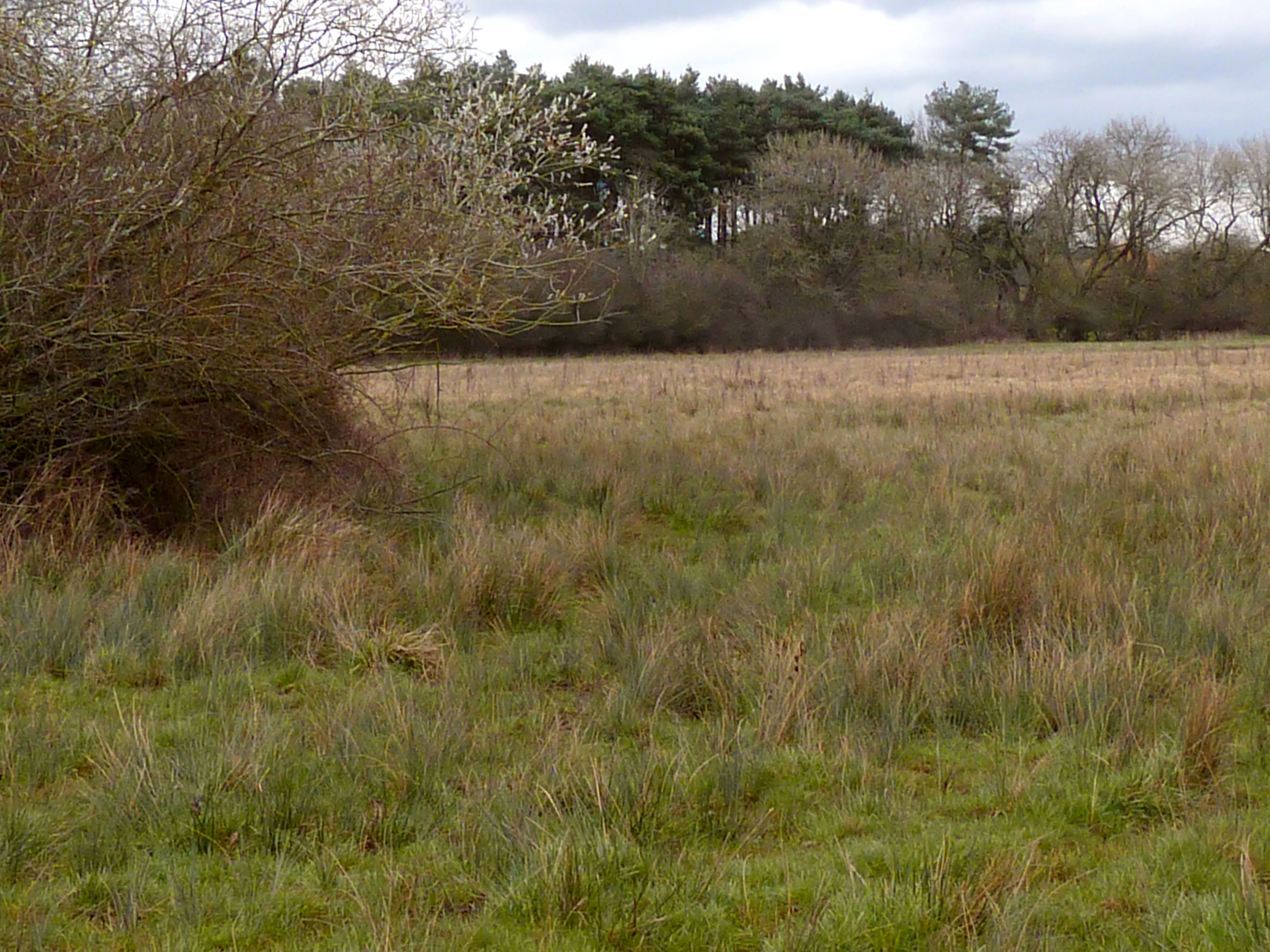
Part of the marsh area

Bishop Monkton Ings is a 37.788 hectares (0.378 km^{2}; 0.146 sq mi) biological Site of Special Scientific Interest (SSSI). It lies to the south of Ripon, North Yorkshire. Access is via the muddy Ings Lane public footpath running east from Bishop Monkton village to the north-west corner of the site. The track is part of Ripon Rowel Walk. There is no vehicular access, and no facilities. The watercourses Holbeck and Ings Drain run through the site, which contains deciduous woodland, "species-rich marshy grassland subject to winter flooding" and some fen alongside the two streams.

The site was notified as an SSSI on 1 October 1986 for its "diverse range of wetland habitats" including woodland, and also because wetland such as this was once widespread, but is now under threat from land improvement and the drainage requirements of adjacent agricultural land and settlements.

== Significant site content ==
Note: Unless otherwise stated, images of flora and fauna in this article are for illustrative purposes only, and were not taken at this site.

=== Flora ===
The marshy grassland benefits from sporadic winter floods, resulting in a variety of plant life. It has greater bird's foot trefoil, square stalked St John's wort, meadow vetchling, tufted vetch, ragged robin, great burnet, wild angelica and common valerian. More common species here are marsh marigold, meadowsweet, hard rush (Juncus inflexus), soft rush and lesser pond sedge.

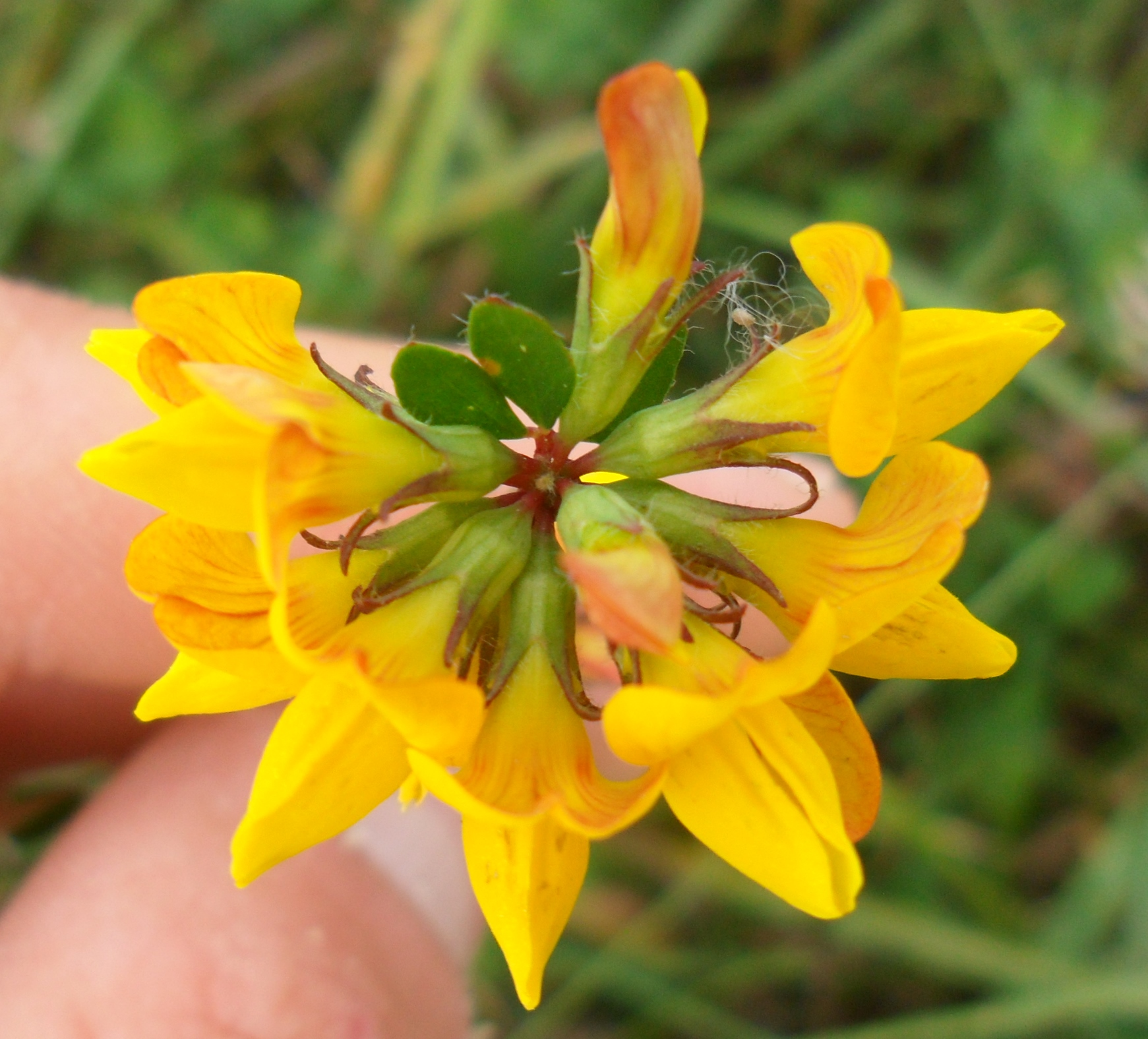
Greater bird's foot trefoil

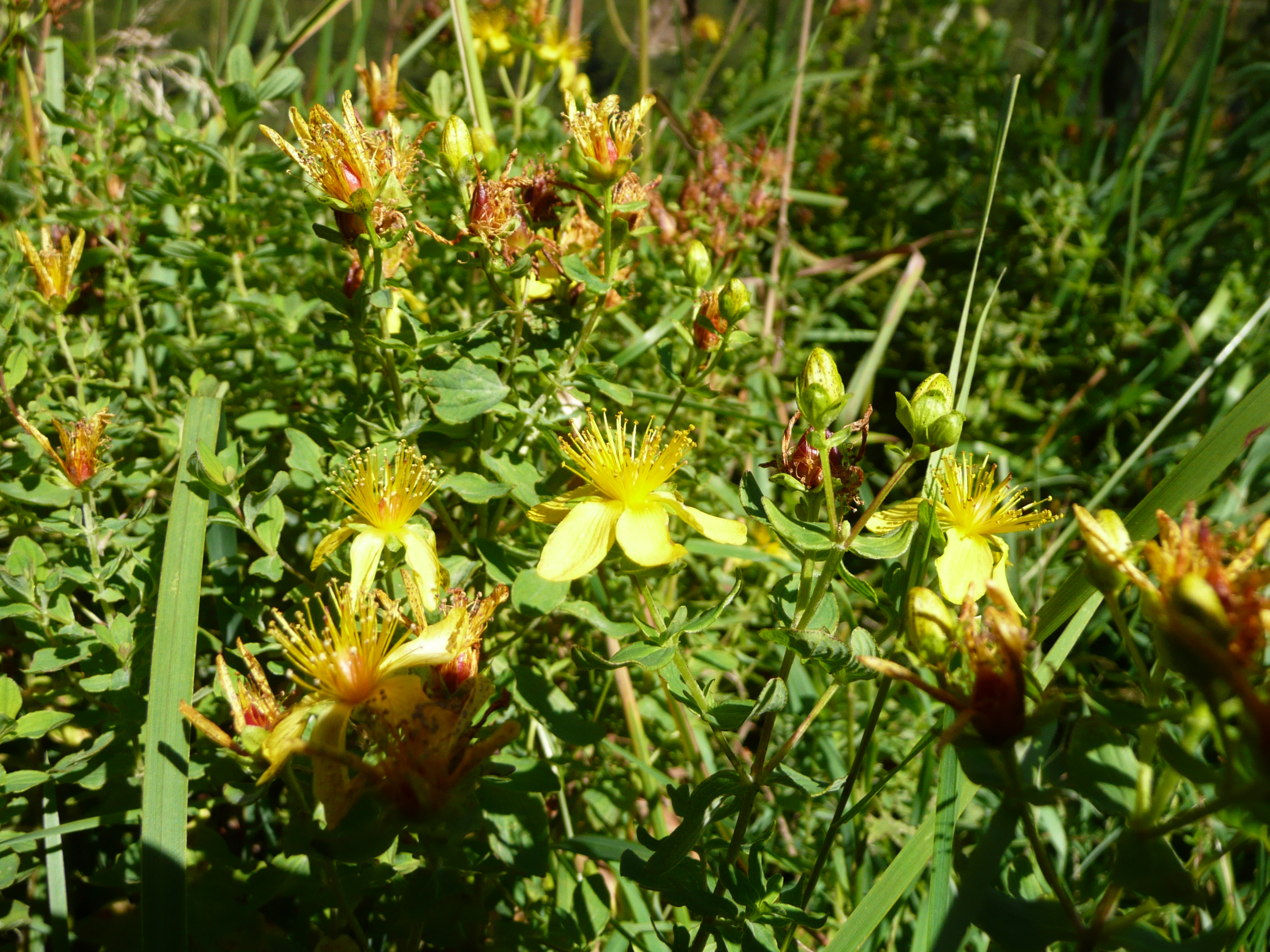
Square stalked St John's wort

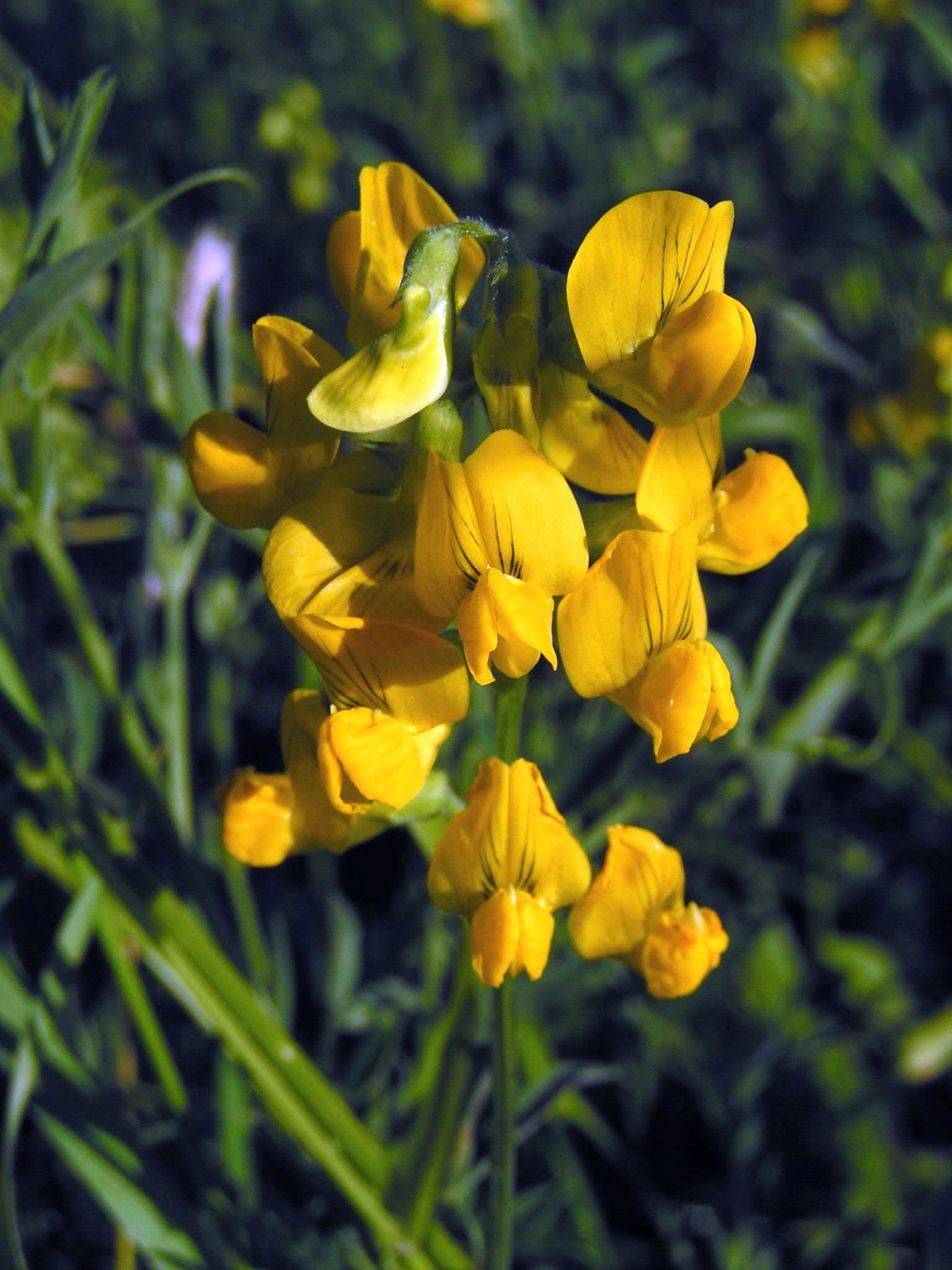
Meadow vetchling

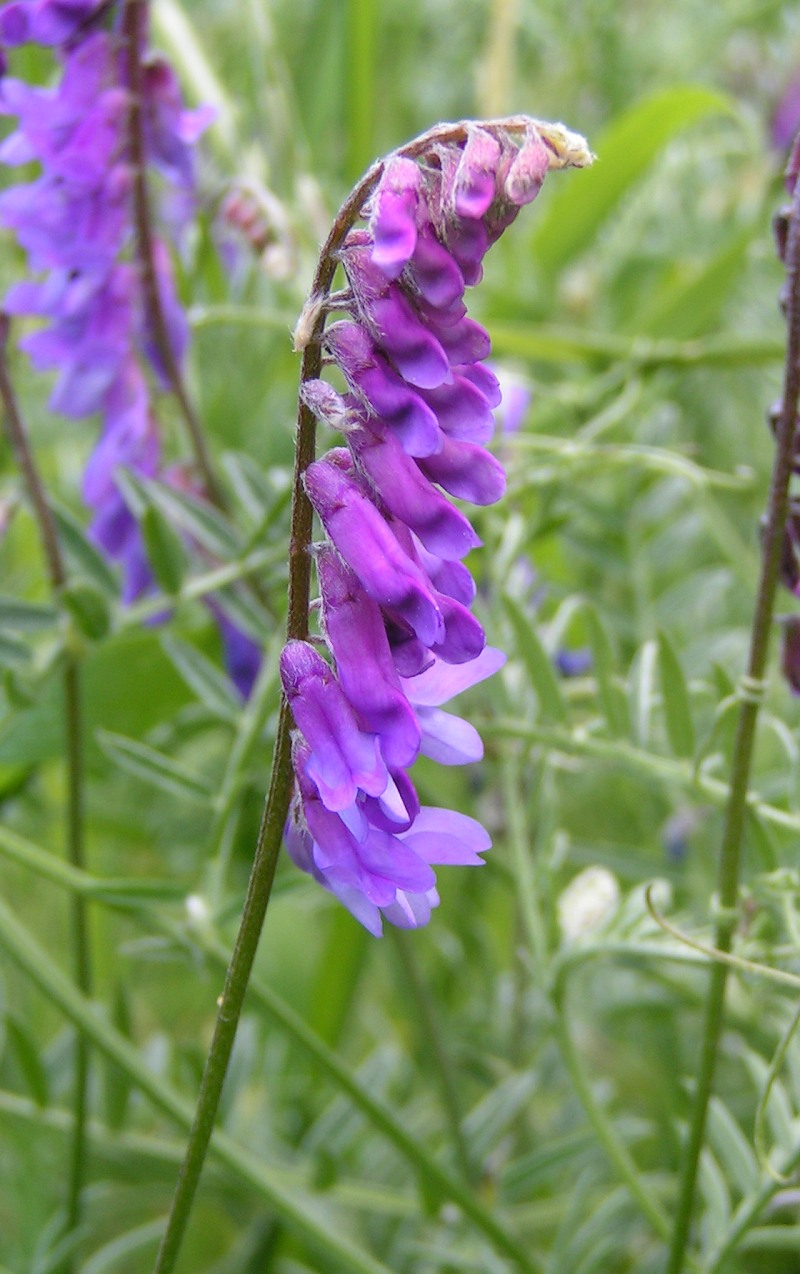
Tufted vetch

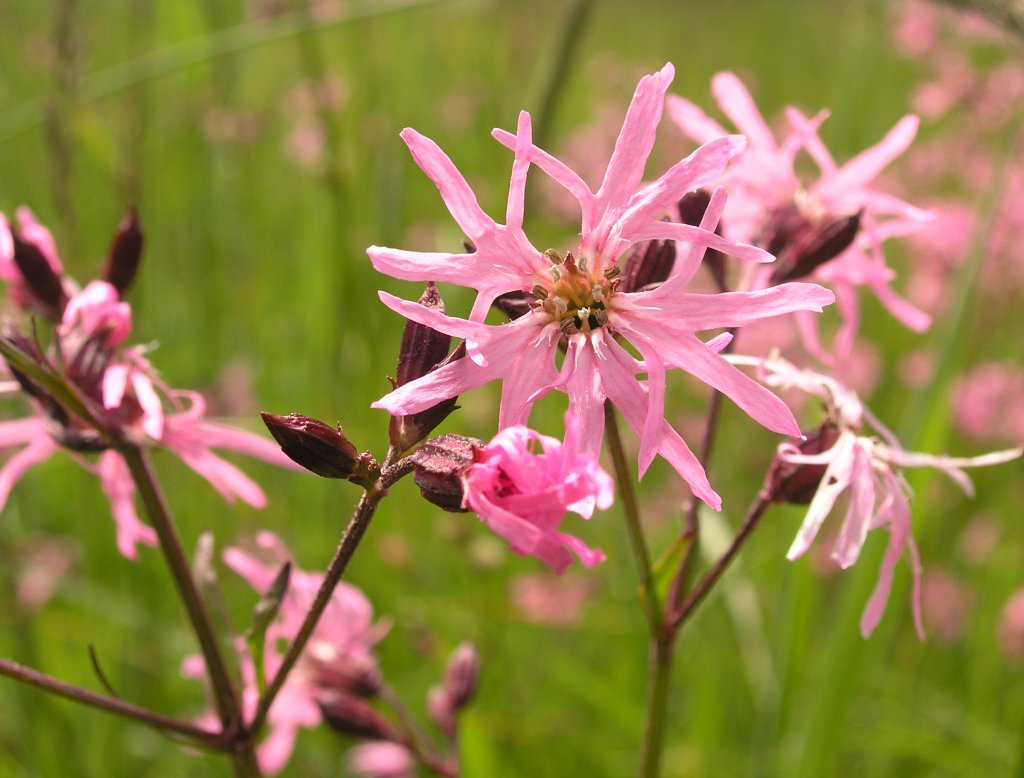
Ragged robin

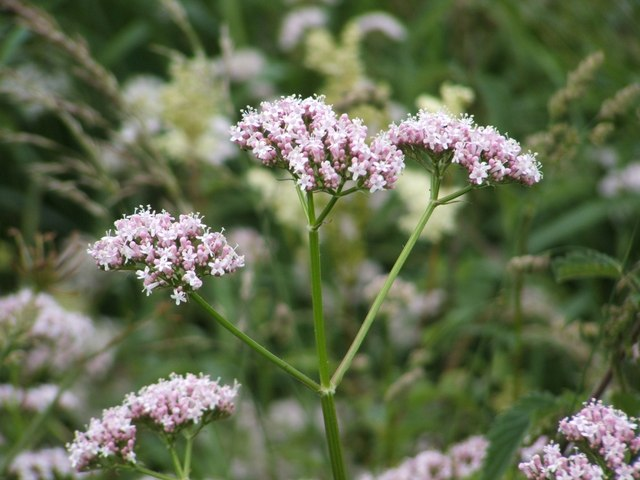
Common valerian

Near the springs, plants benefit from the aquifer's calcareous minerals, so the following plants grow here: marsh lousewort (Pedicularis palustris), marsh valerian (Valeriana dioica), carnation sedge, glaucous sedge, common sedge, brown sedge, black bogrush, other cyperaceous species and bryophytes. The most common plant here is the blunt-flowered rush.

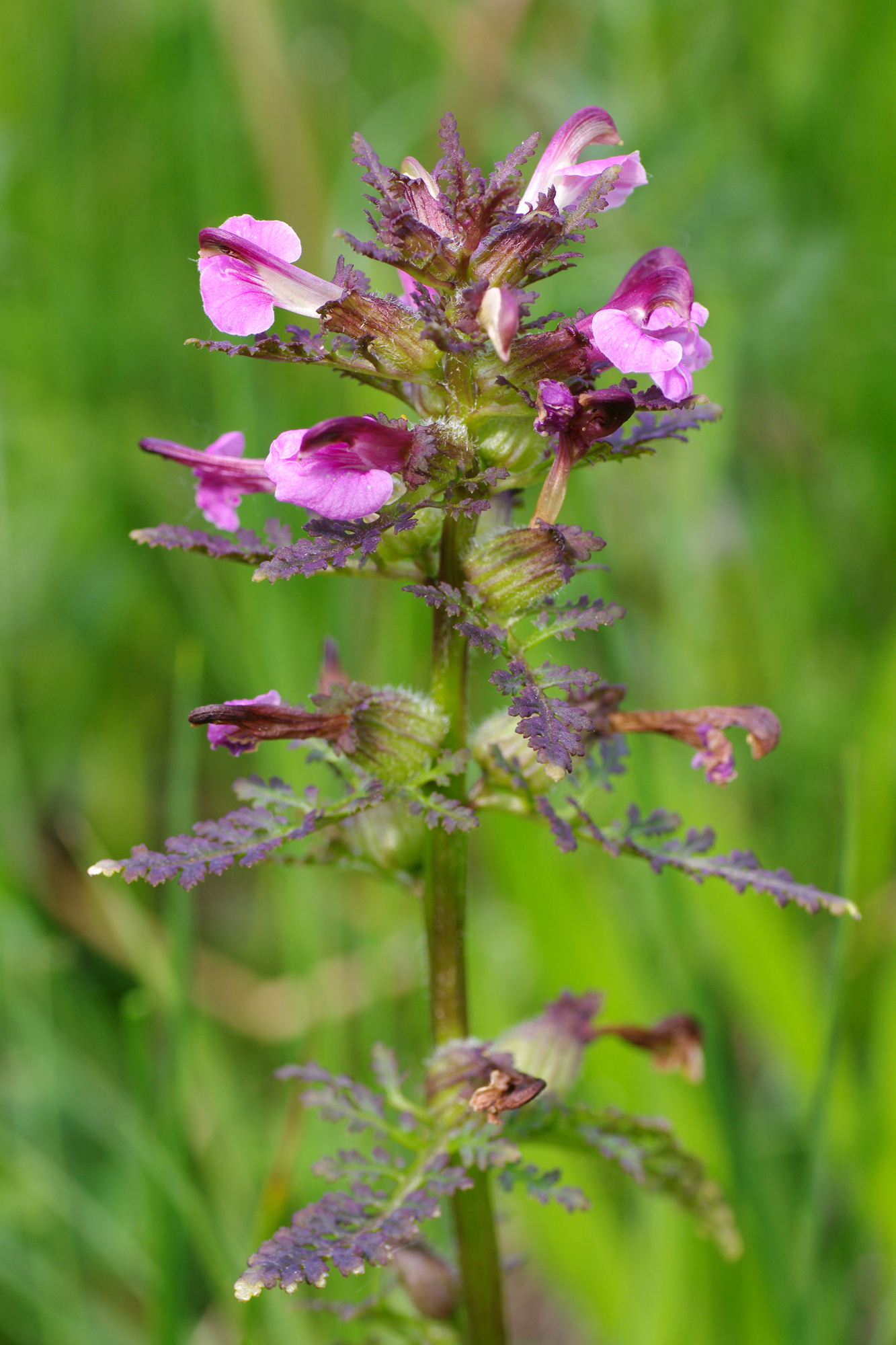
Marsh lousewort

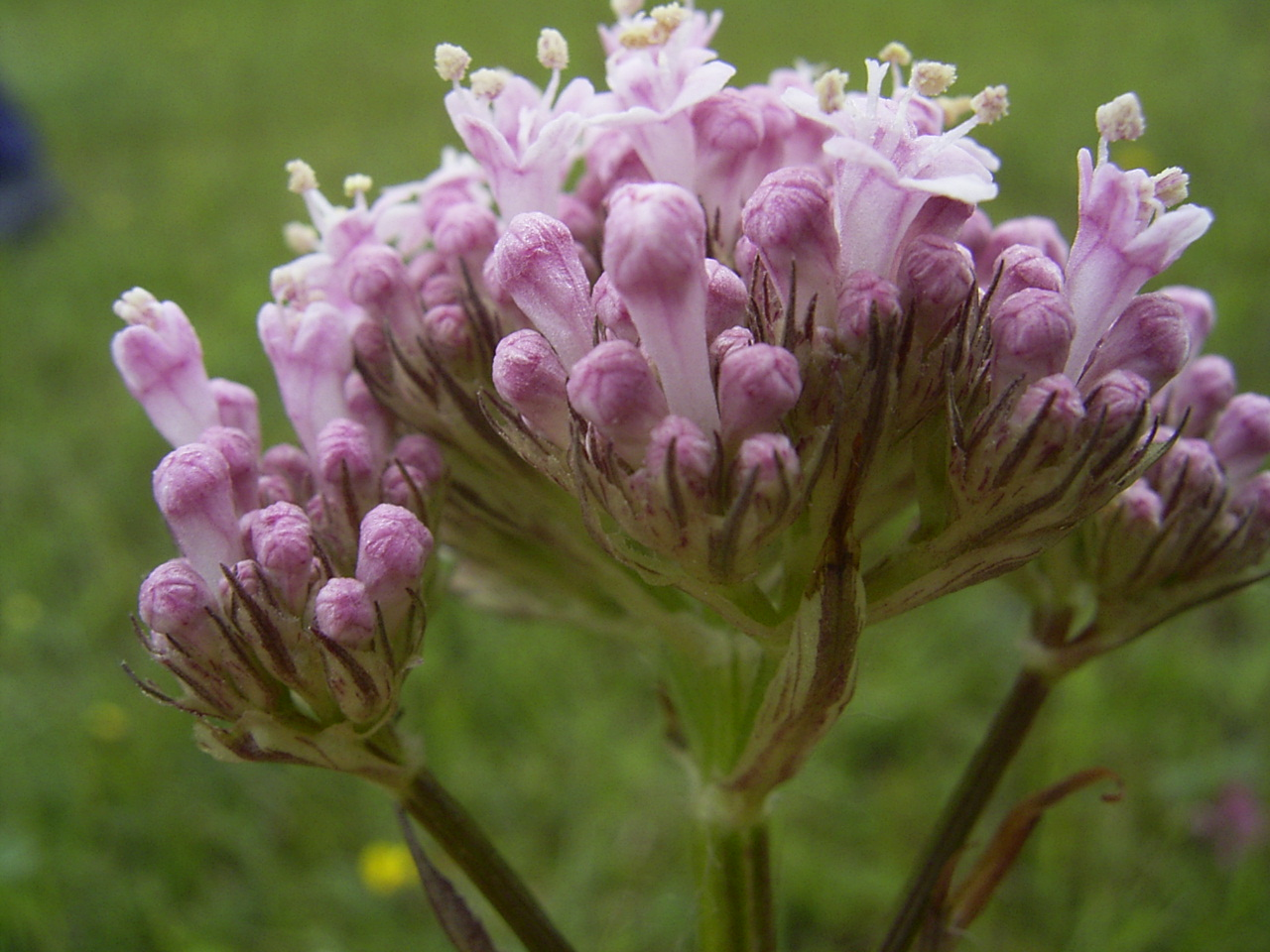
Marsh valerian

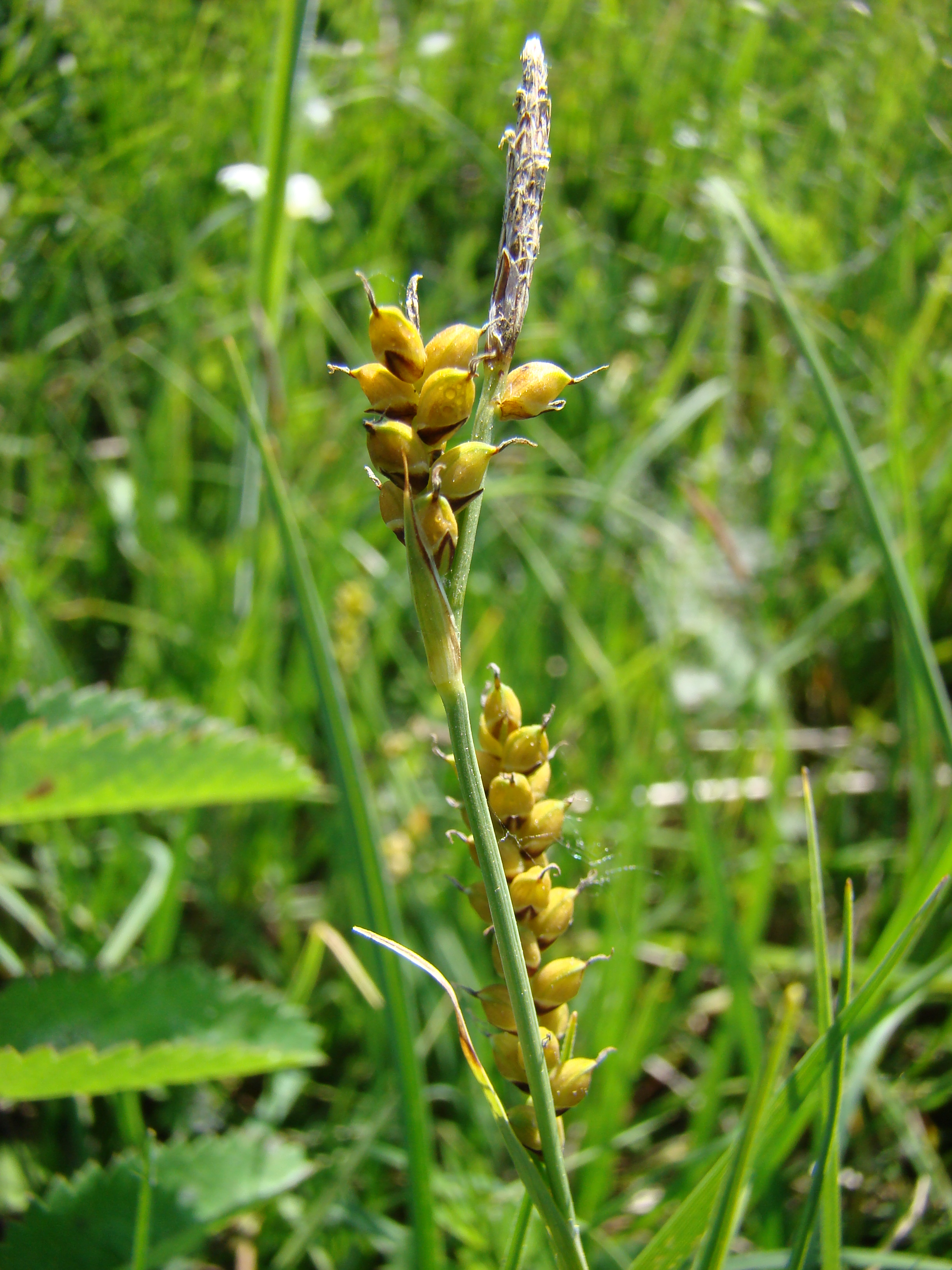
Carnation sedge

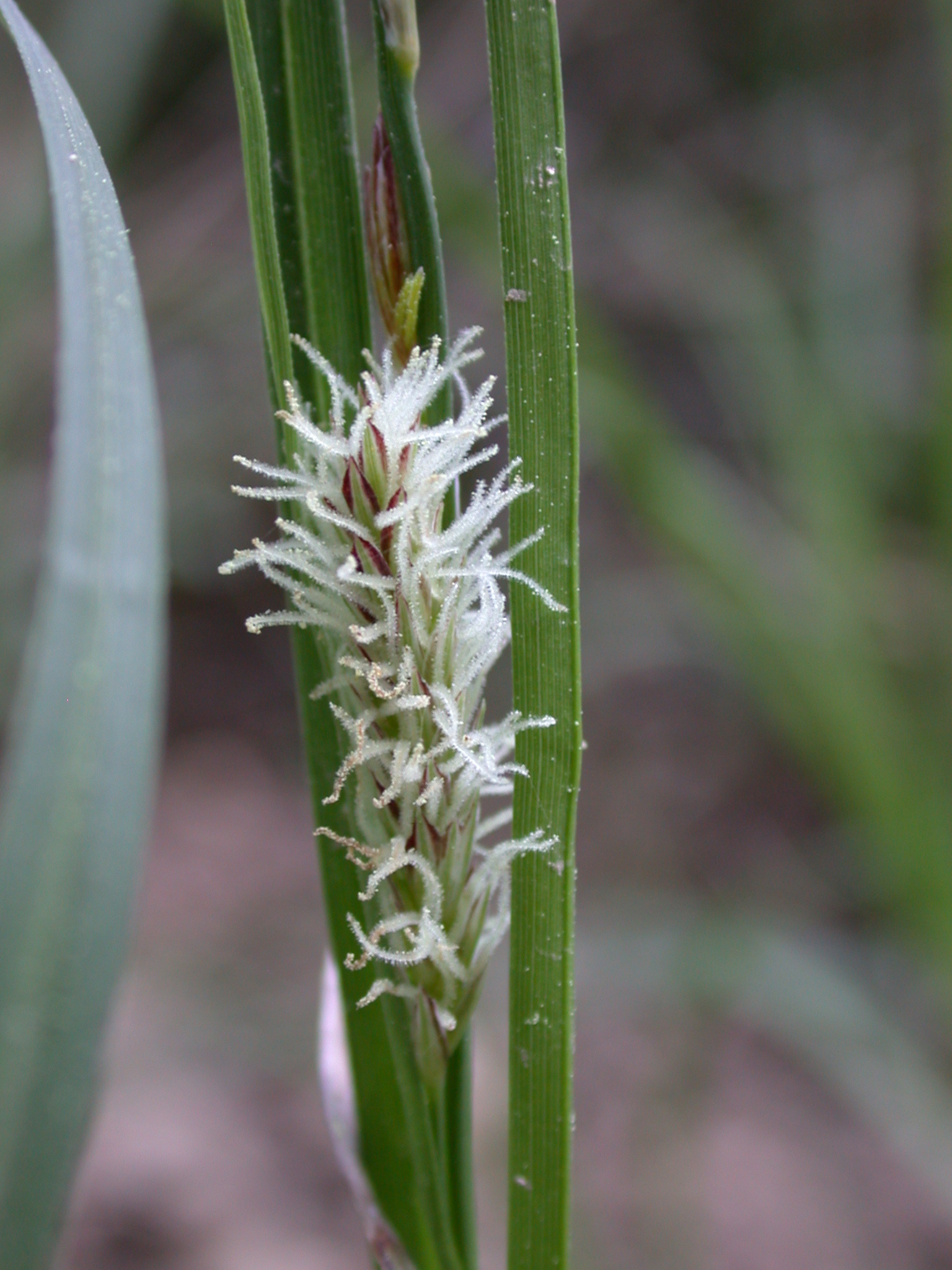
Glaucous sedge

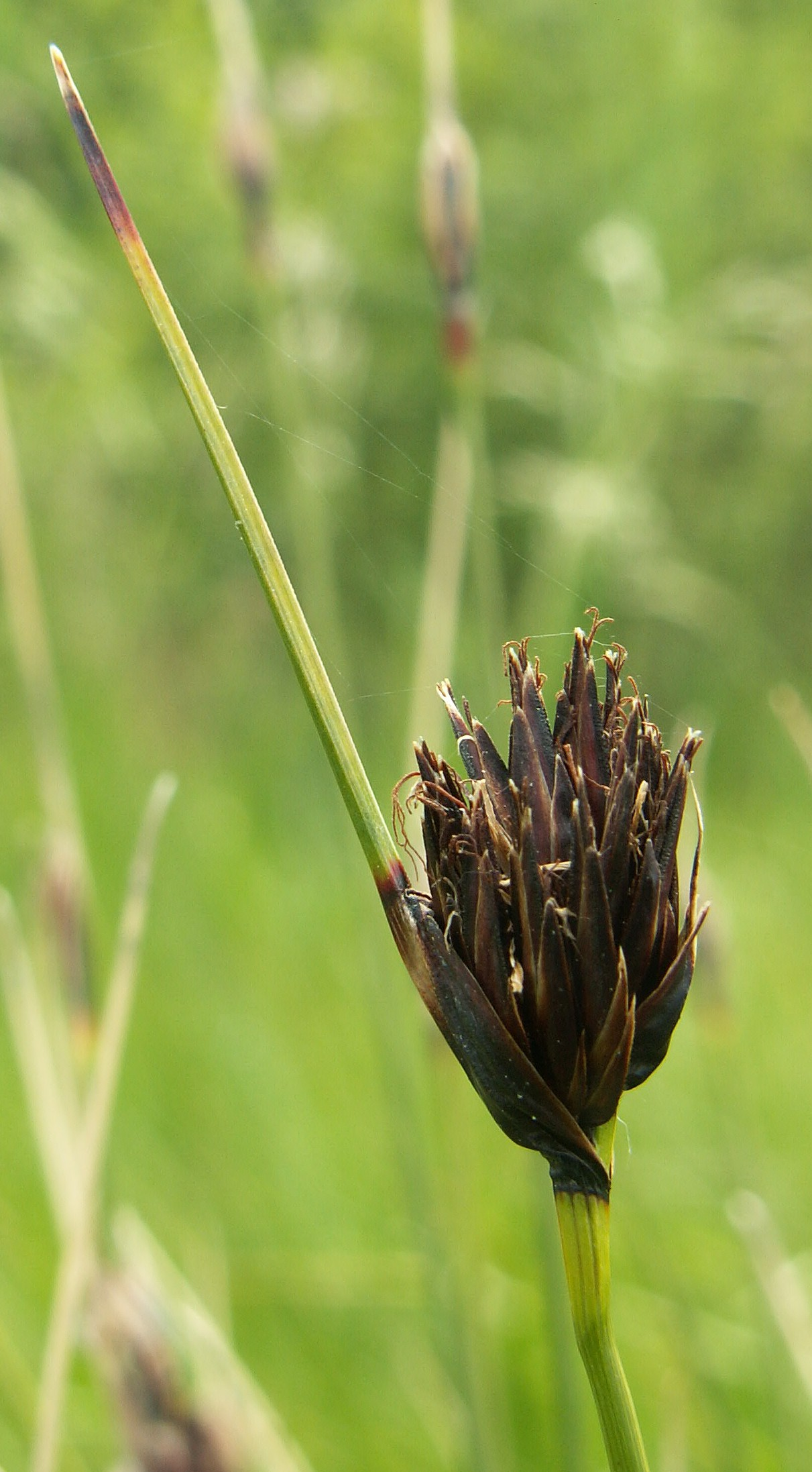
Black bogrush

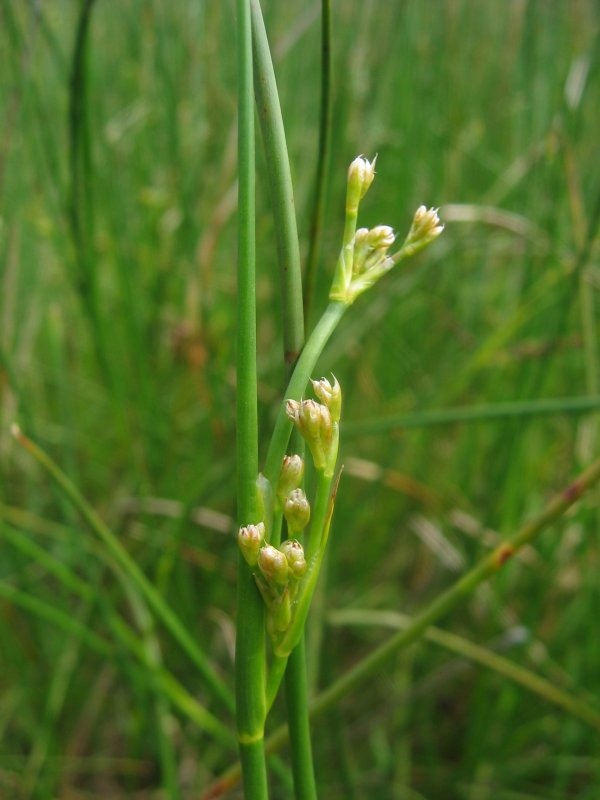
Blunt-flowered rush

On raised ground in the south of the site there is grassland with neutral (as opposed to calcareous) soil. Here is found bugle, great burnet. sneezewort, devil's bit scabious, pignut and creeping buttercup. These flowers grow among grasses such as tufted hair grass, Yorkshire fog and sweet vernal grass.

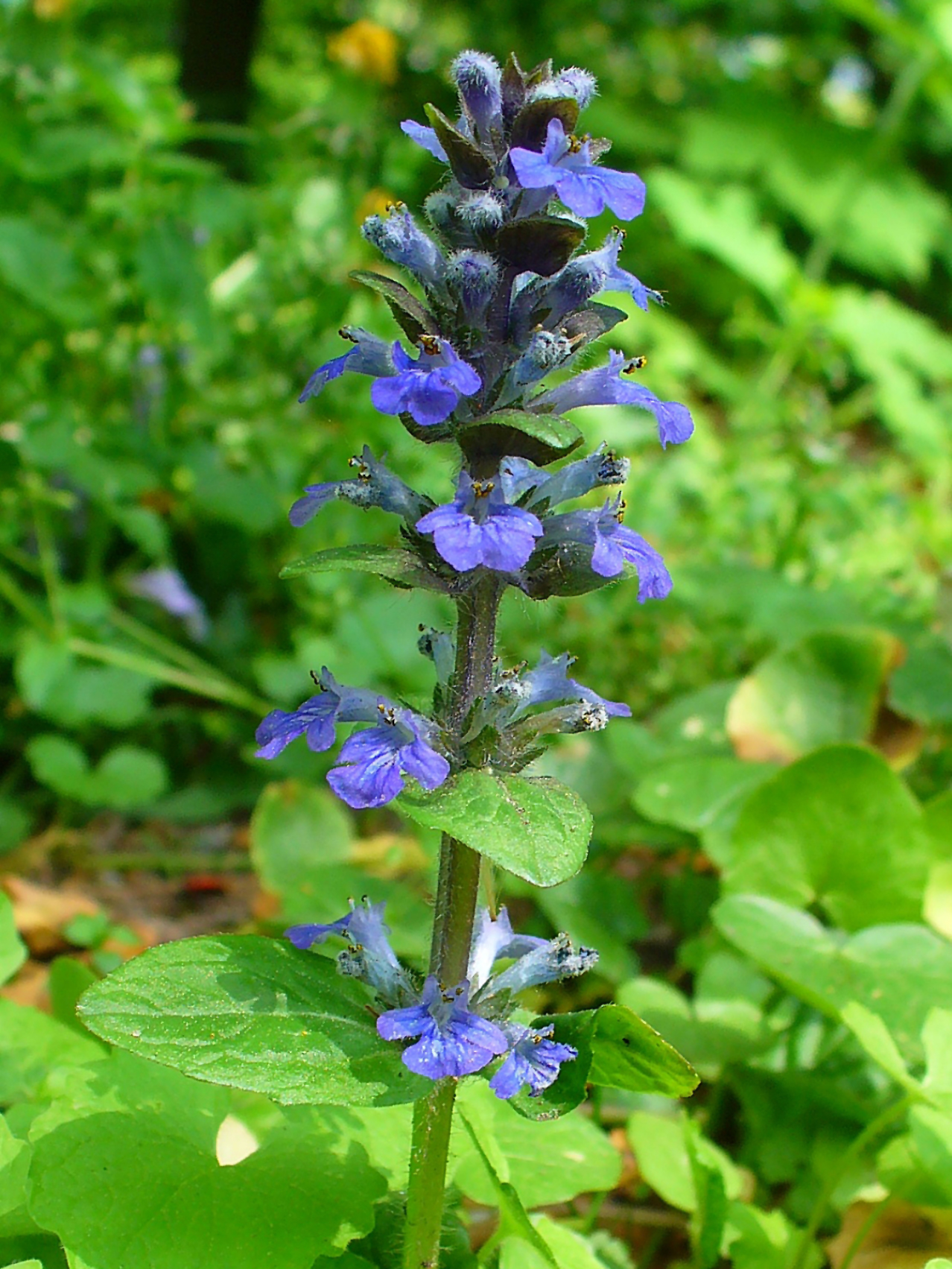
Bugle

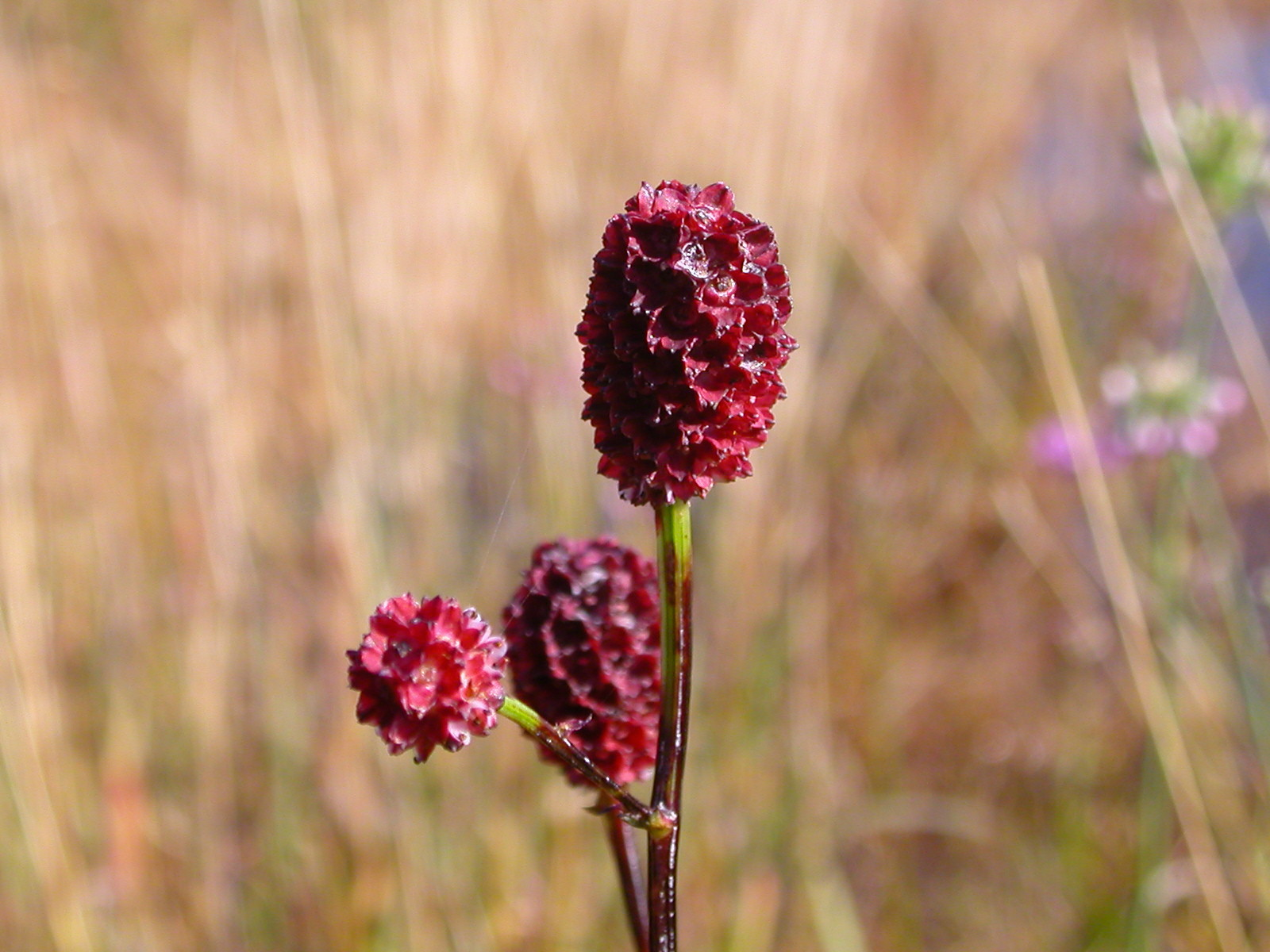
Great burnet

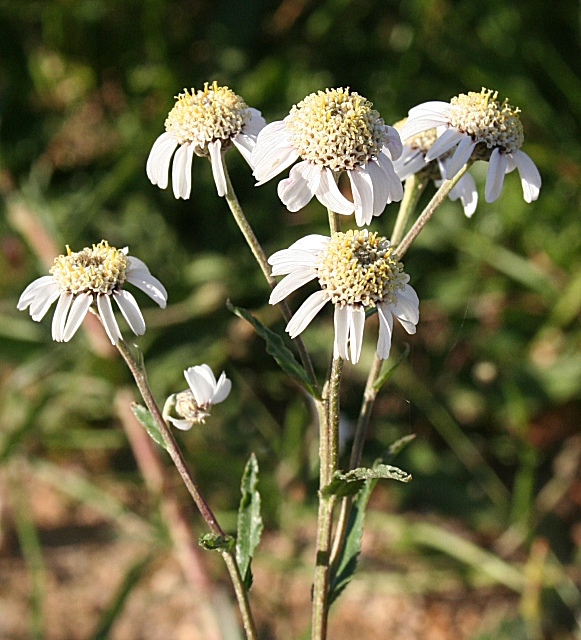
Sneezewort

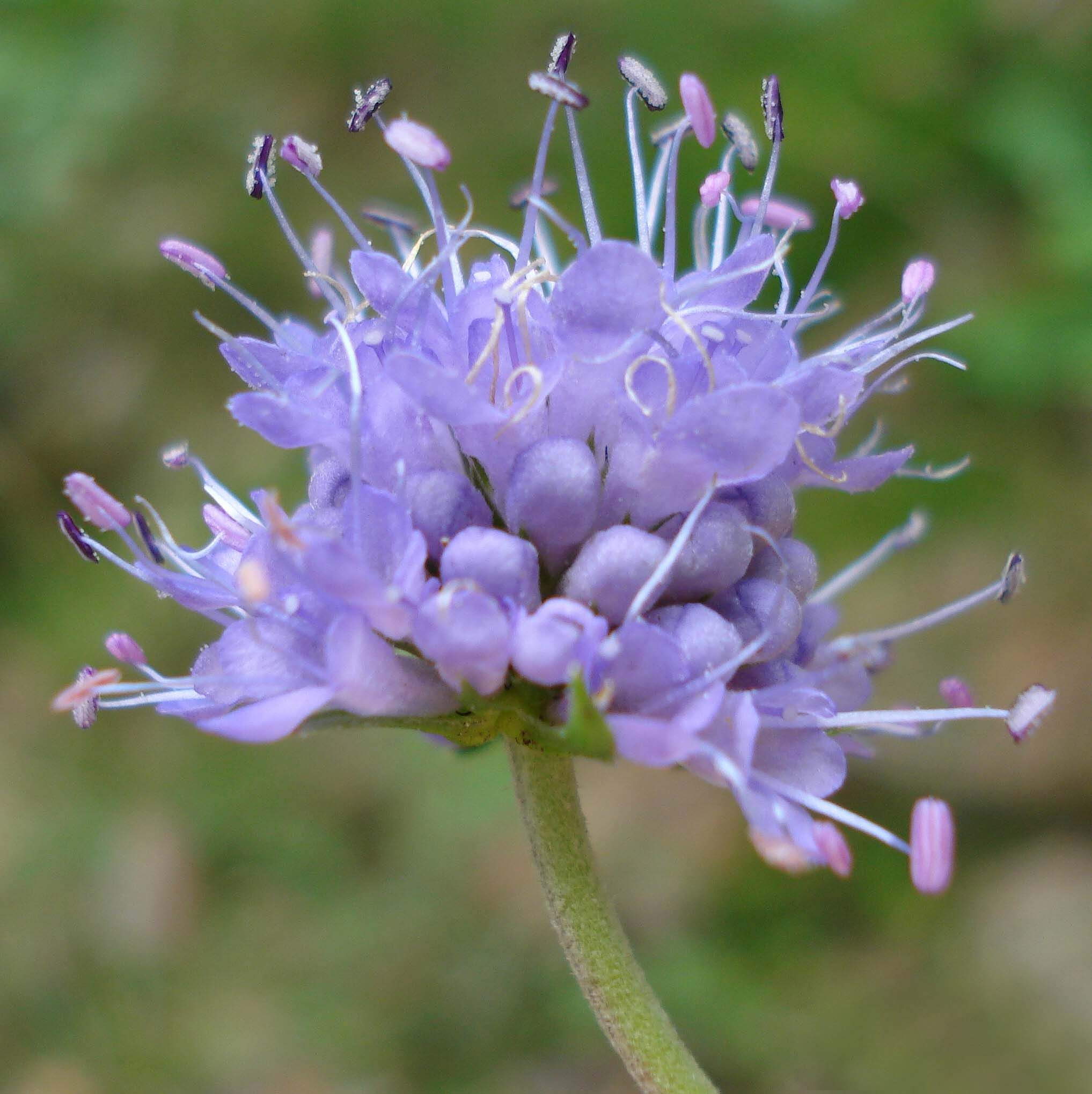
Devil's bit scabious

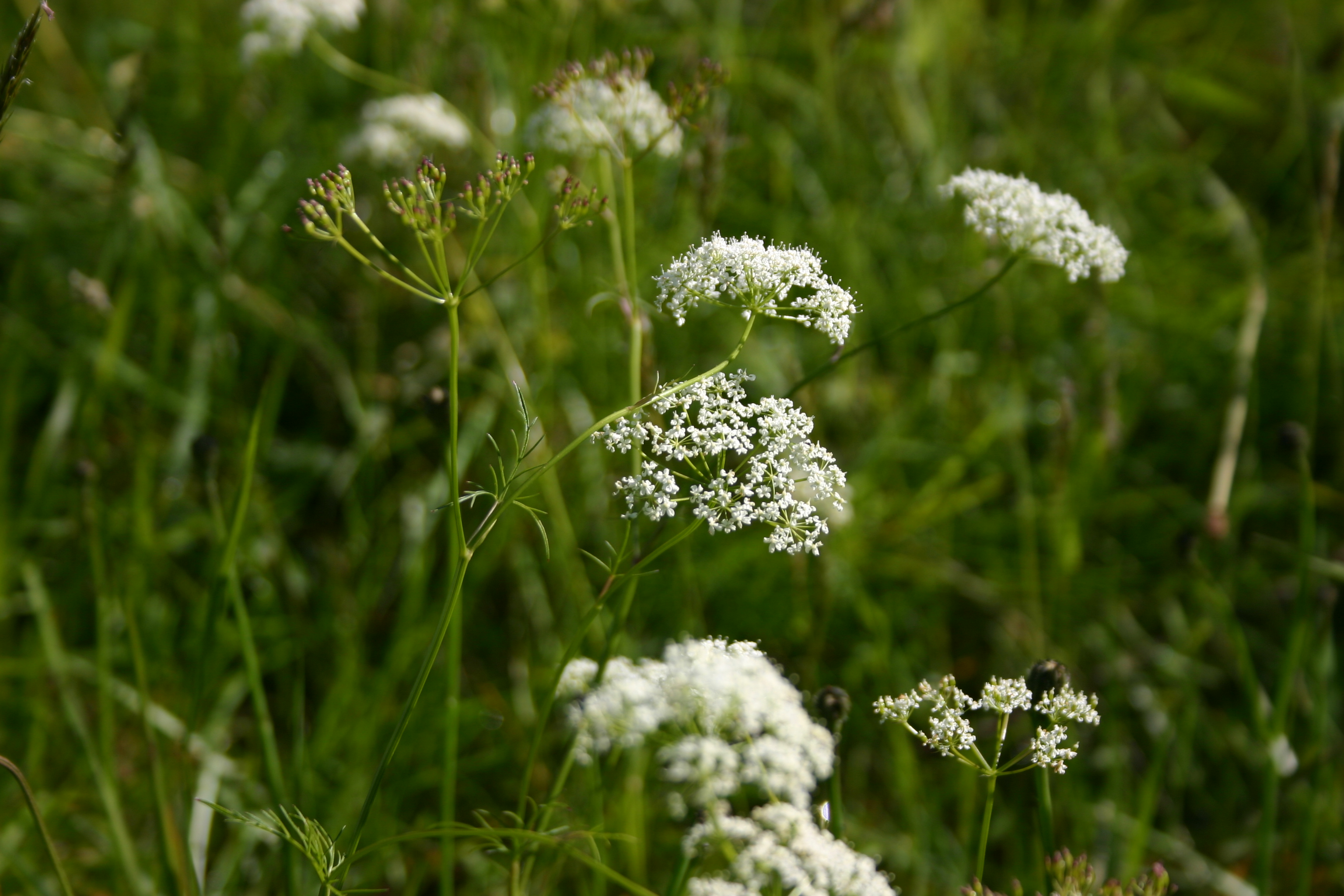
Pignut

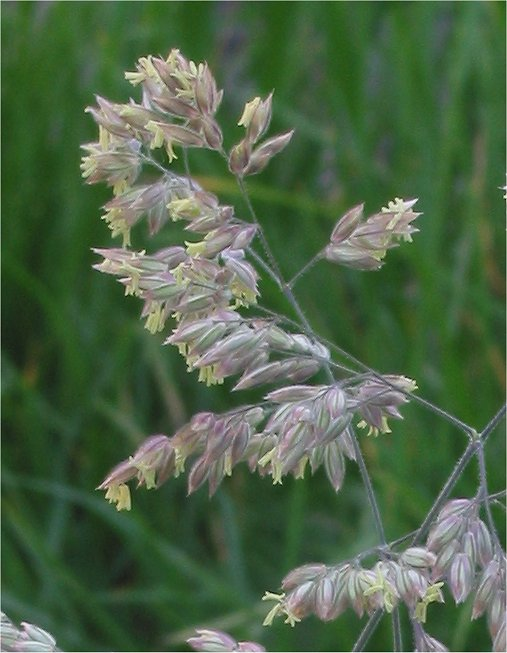
Yorkshire fog

There are three patches of deciduous woodland on the site. Under the trees in the dampest places are wild angelica and meadowsweet. On the slightly raised and drier ground can be found a number of plants including wood avens, red campion and dog's mercury. Guelder rose is frequent here. The trees include bay willow, crack willow, ash and alder.

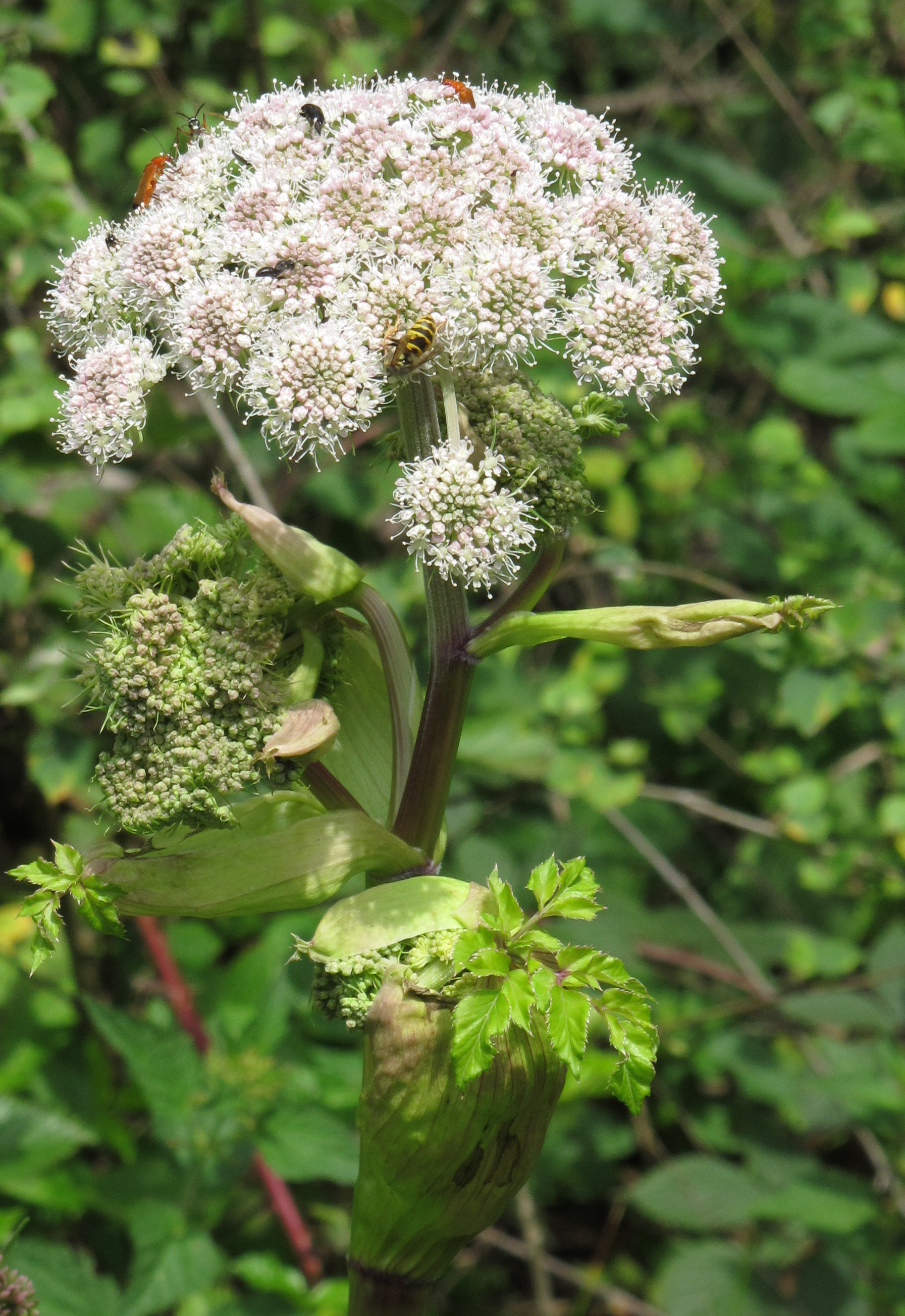
Wild angelica

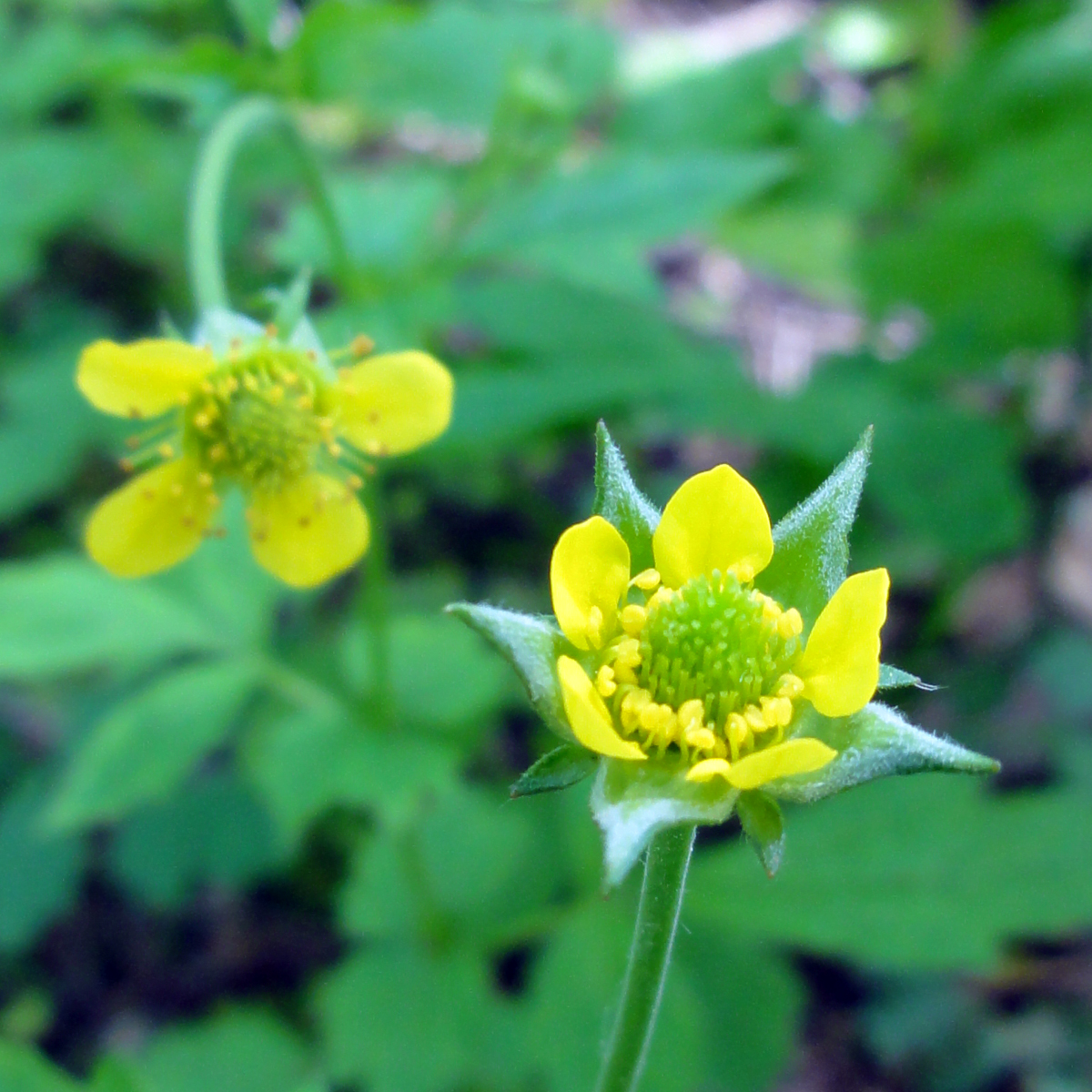
Wood avens

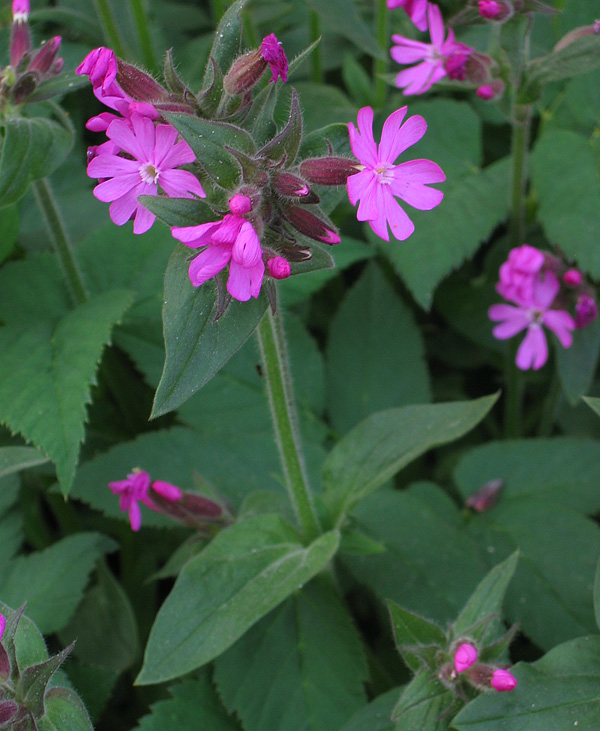
Red campion

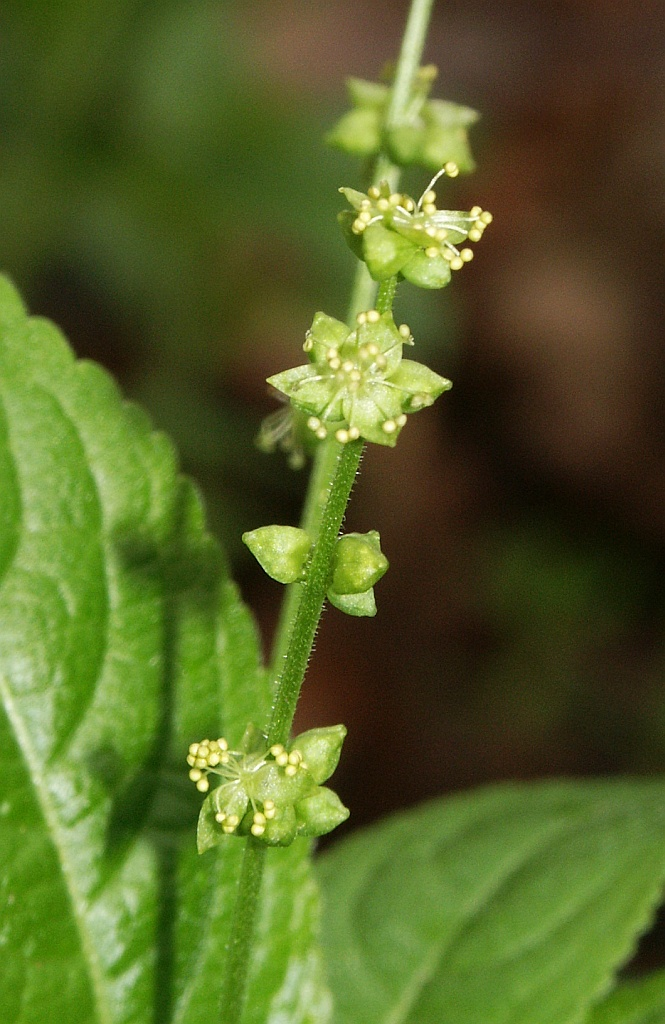
Dog's mercury

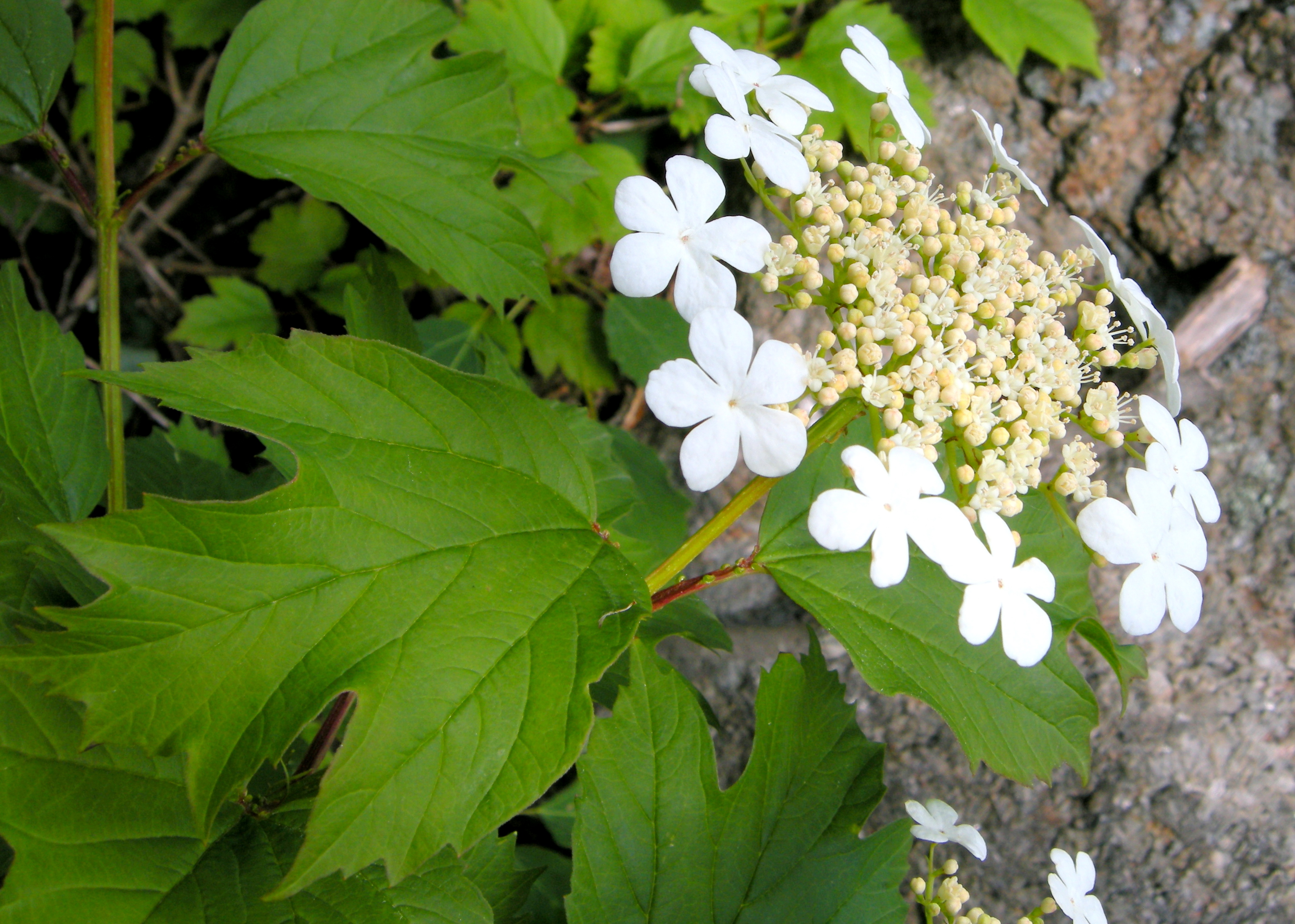
Guelder rose

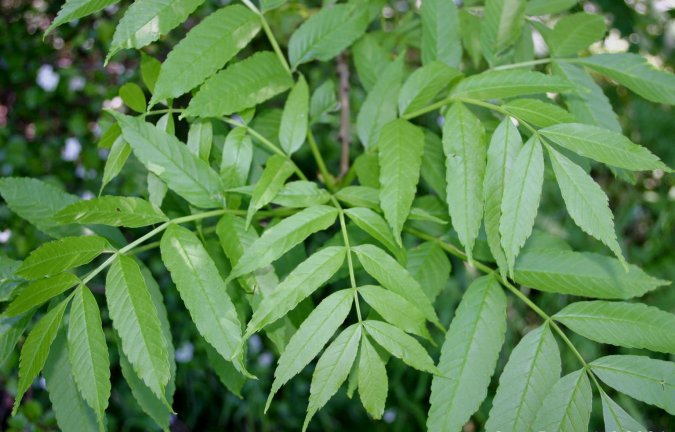
Ash

An important habitat here is the fen alongside the watercourses. Here are reed canary grass, reed sweet grass and the reed Phragmites australis.

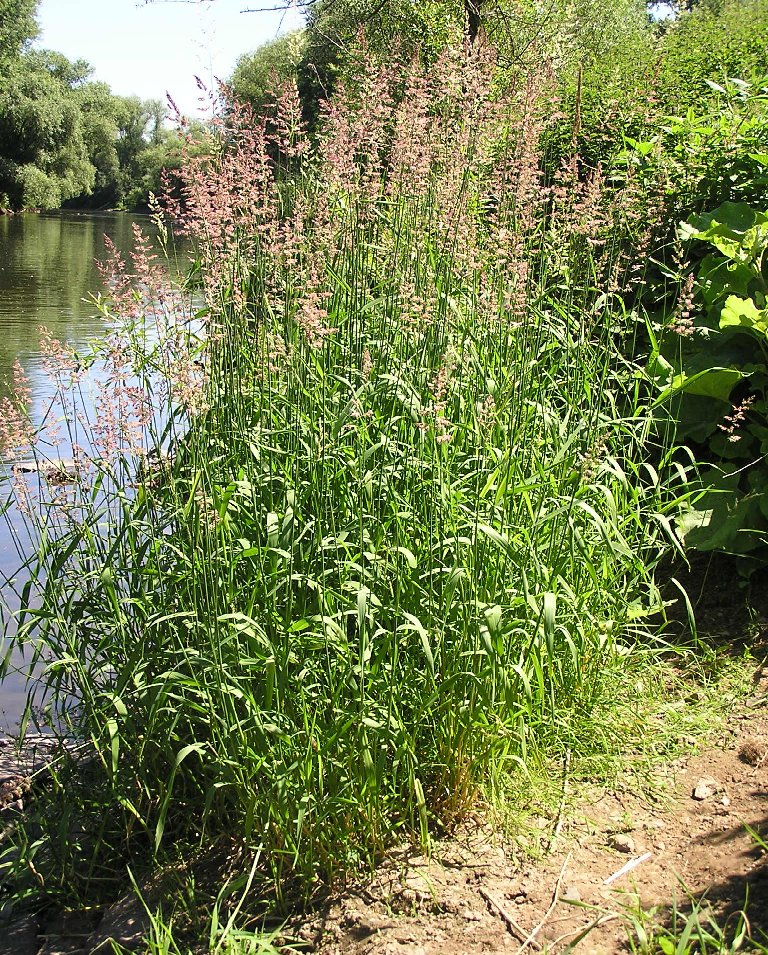
Reed canary grass

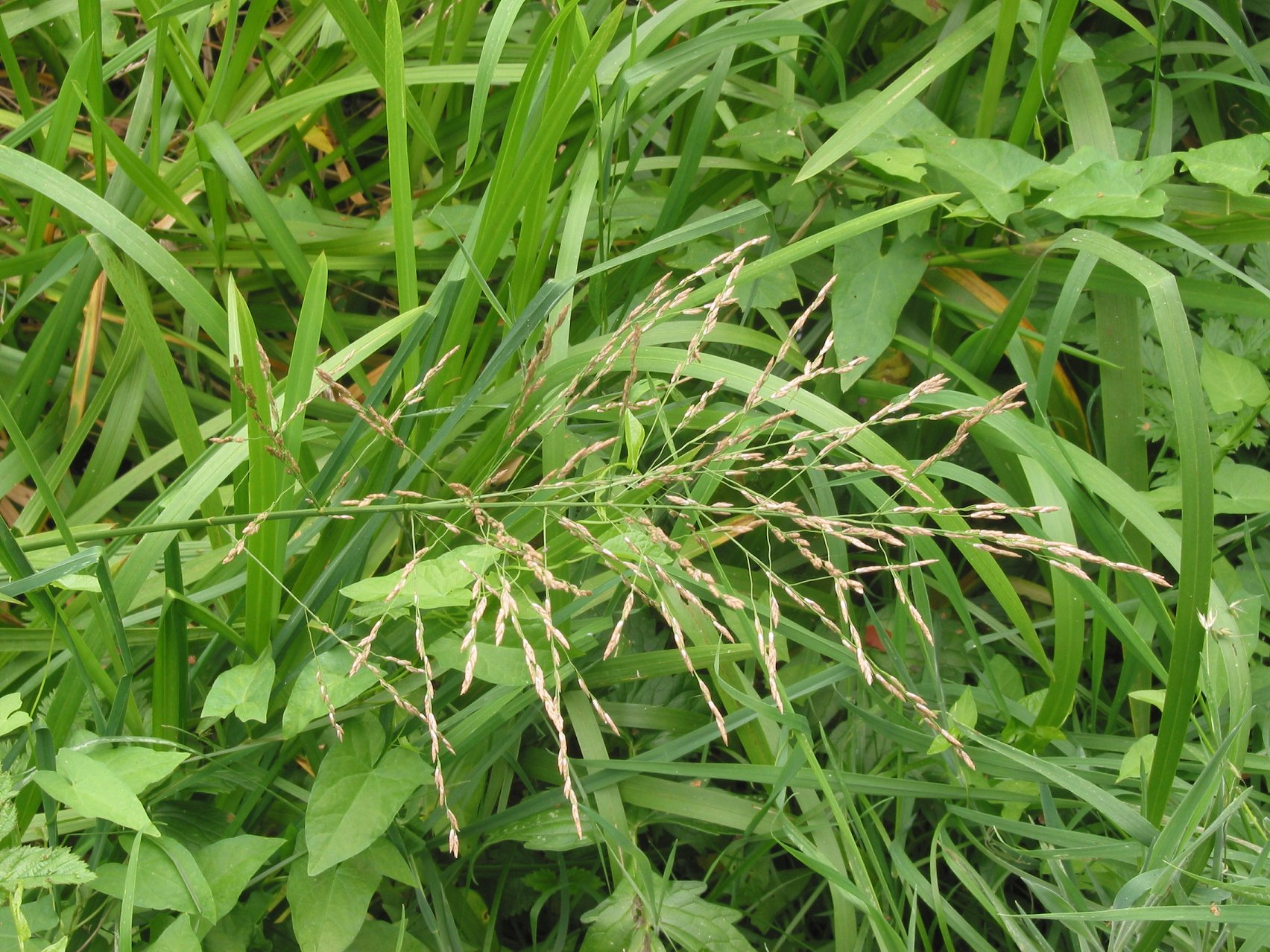
Reed sweet grass

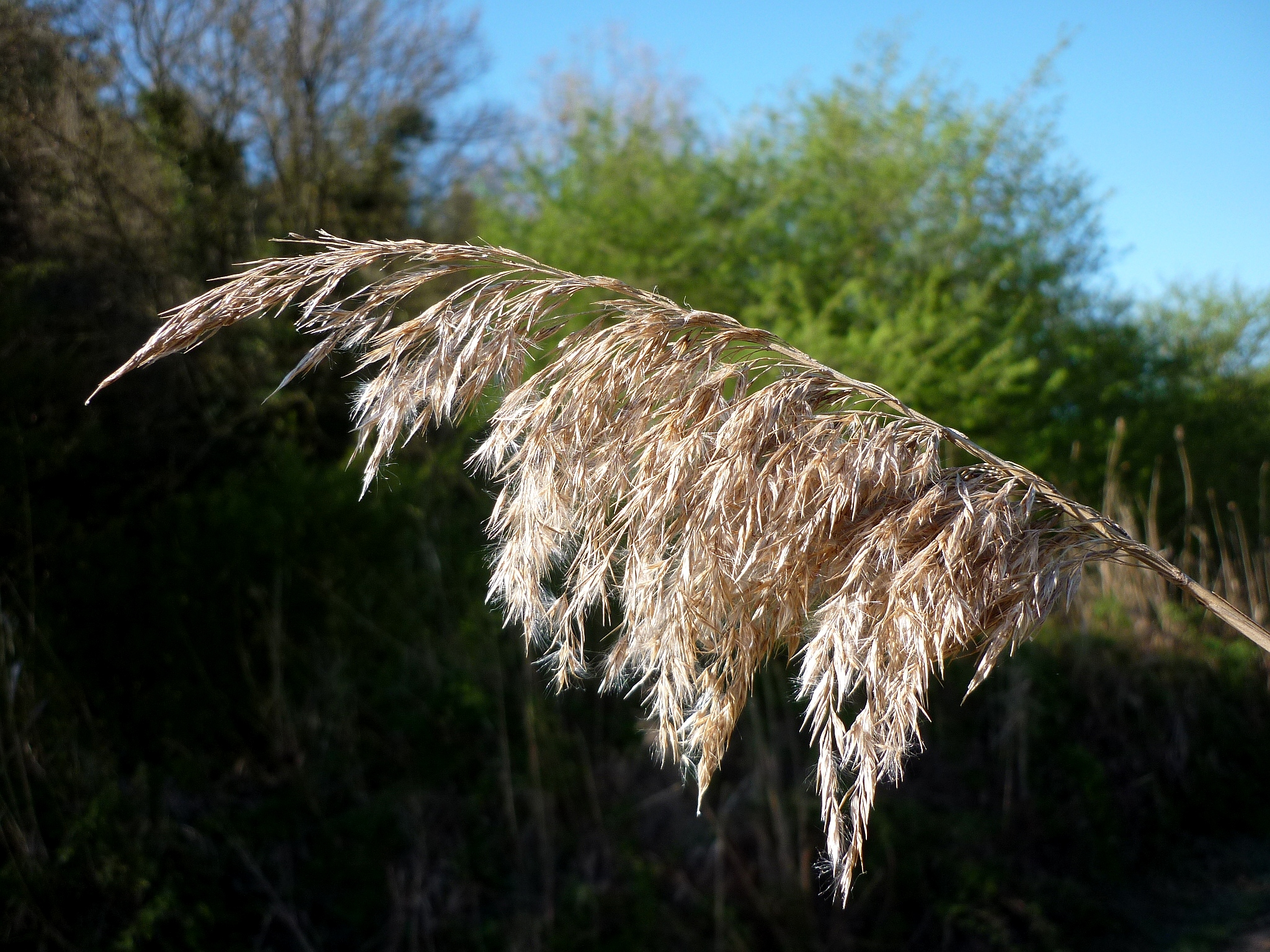
Phragmites australis

=== Fauna ===
Common snipe and curlew are among the waders which breed in the fen.

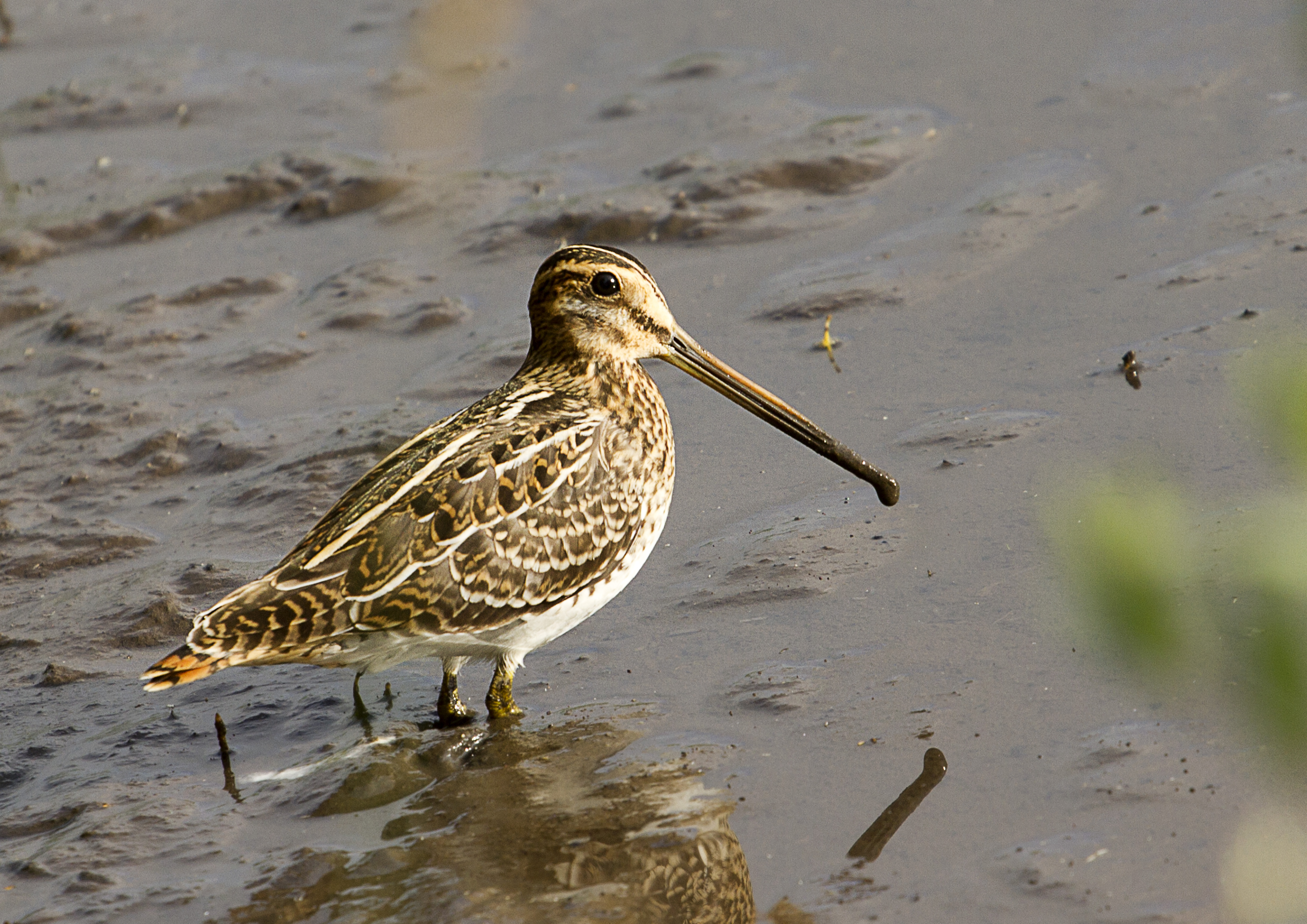
Common snipe

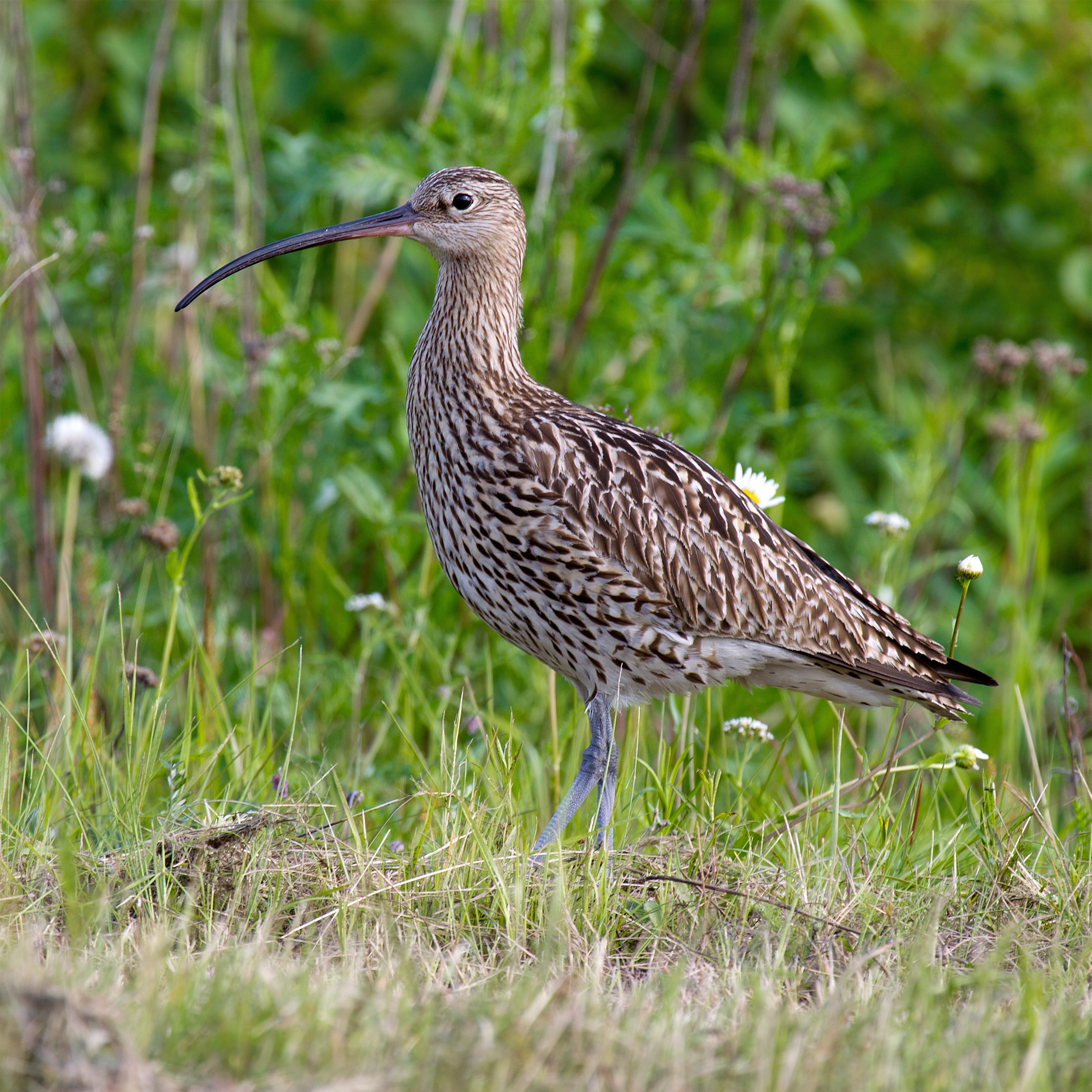
Curlew

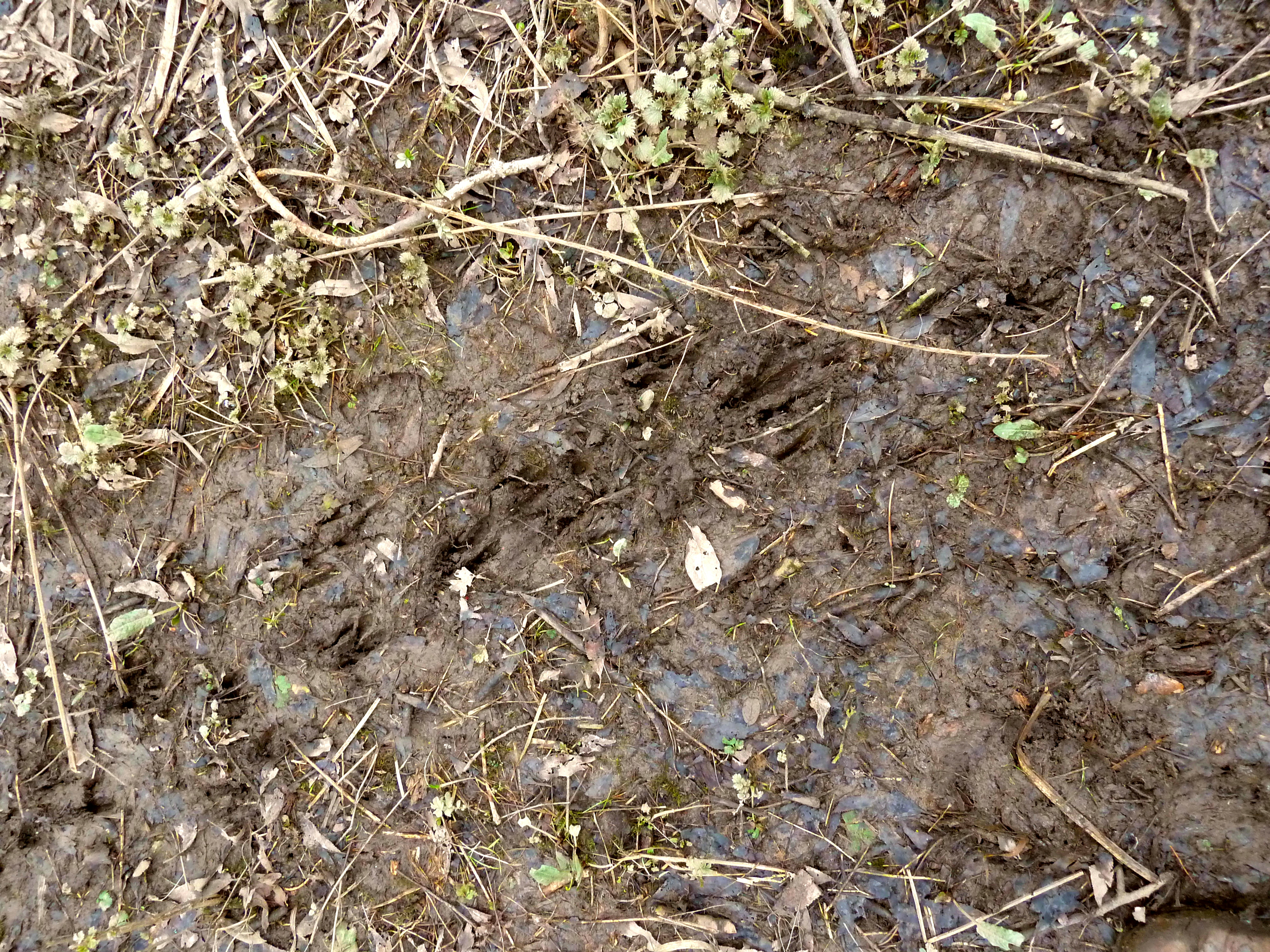
Roe deer tracks, at Bishop Monkton Ings

== Maintenance ==
Annual light grazing is required, by cattle, ponies or hill sheep, to maintain a rich and varied diversity of herbs and other biota on the grassland. The purpose of this is to prevent a build-up of tall grasses and dead vegetation, which in turn would inhibit diverse plant growth, and overshadow weaker plants. Grazing should occur between late spring and early autumn if there are no ground-nesting birds there. The size and function of existing drains should be maintained, and some scrub and hedge should be retained. Changes to drainage, and the use of fertiliser, herbicides and pesticides, are strongly discouraged because they would change the quality and diversity of the present plant and animal life.

== Development and risk assessment ==
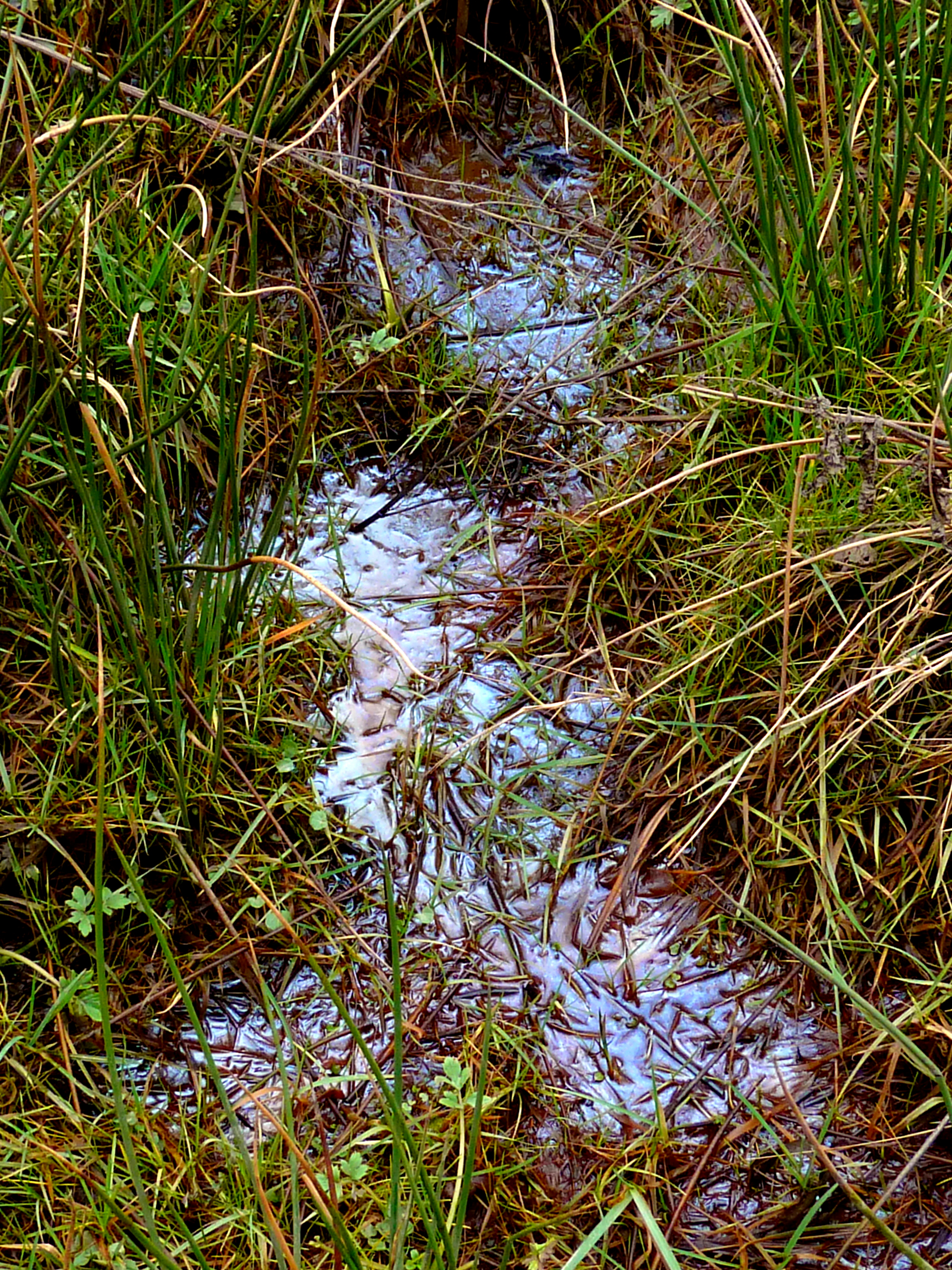
The bog water here has a natural oily sheen

Both units of fen, marsh and swamp were assessed by Natural England in 2011. The first unit was judged to be in favourable condition, with some hawthorn scrub clearance required, although this section passed the assessment due to a good diversity of species, and the grassland was in good condition. The second unit was judged "unfavourable but recovering", because hawthorn scrub was encroaching onto grassland and fen. The assessor found ragwort scattered across the site. No explanation is given for the mention in the assessment of ragwort, but it is possible that a balance had to be made between its situation as a controlled plant, with toxicity to cattle and ponies, and its advantages as a pollinator and ability to host certain insect larvae, such as that of the cinnabar moth. In the UK, the cinnabar moth is a priority species.

In October 2016, this site was assessed for any potential damaging effect of mining for minerals, for a period up to 2030. In 2016 the authorities were seeking more sites for sand and gravel quarries, besides the sites that were already being worked. In 2018 a permit was granted for a poultry farm next to Bishop Monkton Ings, with the requirement that the poultry and the Ings be separated from one another by trees and a fence.

== See also ==
Other SSSIs in the Harrogate region are: Brimham Rocks, Cow Myers, Farnham Mires, Hack Fall Wood, Hay-a-Park, Kirk Deighton Mar Field Fen, Quarry Moor, and Ripon Parks.
