= Mar Field Fen =

Site of Special Scientific Interest in North Yorkshire, England

- Site of Special Scientific Interest
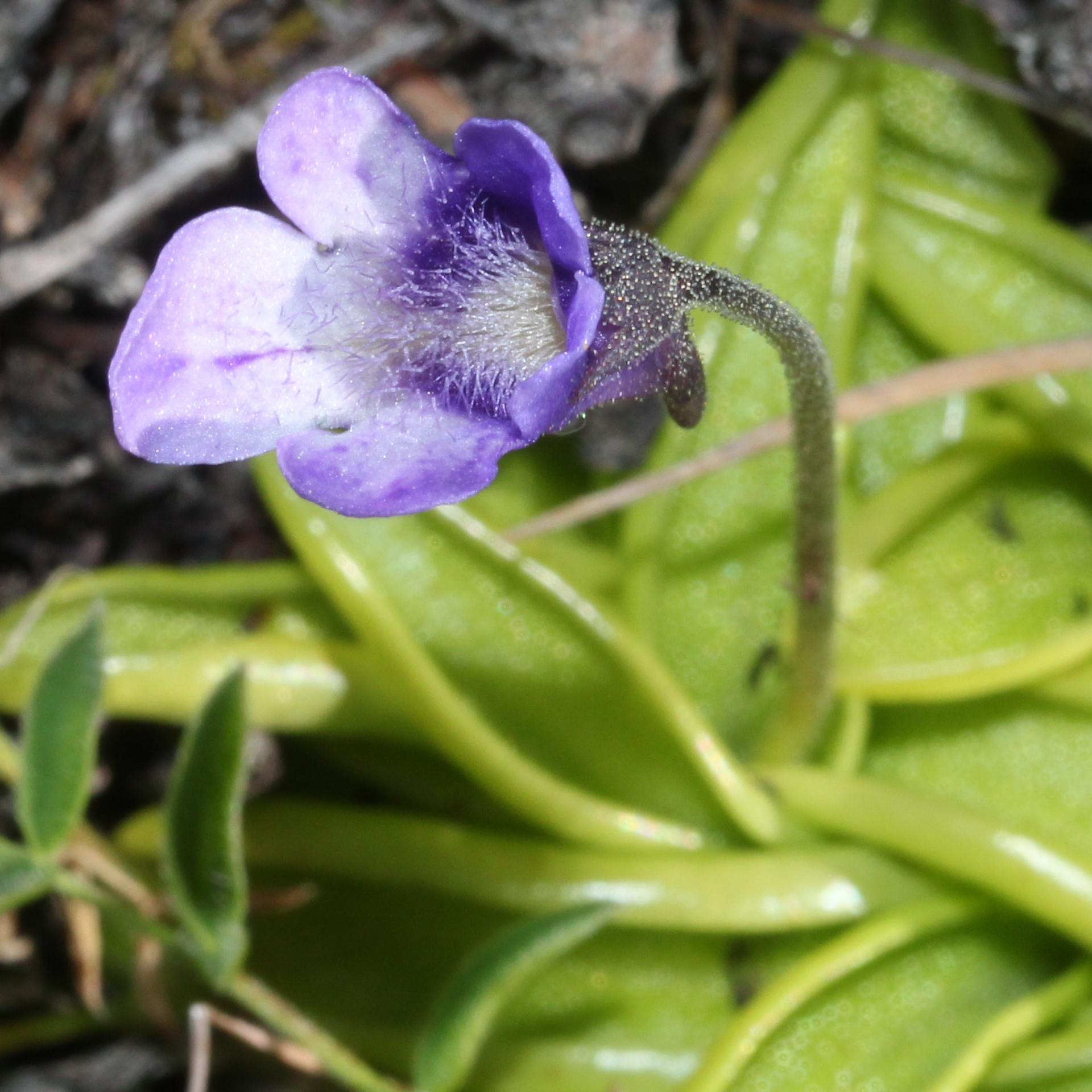
- Common butterwort grows at Mar Field Fen (Note: Unless otherwise stated, the photographs of flora in this article are for plant identification purposes only, and were not taken at this site)

- Location within North Yorkshire
- Location of Mar Field Fen.
- Area of search: North Yorkshire
- Grid reference: SE222819
- Coordinates: 54.2323°N 1.6609°W
- Interest: Biological
- Area: 8.8809 hectares (0.08881 km^{2}; 0.03429 sq mi)
- Notification date: 2 October 1988
- Location map: Magic Map (Defra)

Mar Field Fen is a Site of Special Scientific Interest, or SSSI, north of Masham, North Yorkshire, England, in a rural area known as Marfield. It is situated on land containing woodland carr, fen, spring-fed marshy grassland and drier calcareous grassland, between the River Ure to the east and Marfield Wetland nature reserve to the west. As "one of the best examples of fen habitat in the Vale of York," it is a protected habitat for a variety of plants, including the common butterwort, a carnivorous plant. There is no public access to this site.

== Site history ==
In the 19th century, the site was in hunting country, where the Bedale Hunt would run. The entrants for the annual Bedale Hunt steeplechase would gather in a field called Marfield, a drier place adjacent to the present SSSI site, before moving on to a field called Whitefield for the start of the race.

== Site location and designation ==
Mar Field Fen is a 8.8809 hectares (0.08881 km^{2}; 0.03429 sq mi) biological Site of Special Scientific Interest (SSSI), consisting of woodland carr, fen and calcareous meadow whose flush and spring fed soils support certain specialised vegetation. The site lies north of Masham, North Yorkshire, on the west bank of the River Ure. There are public footpaths to the east and west of the site, but no public access, vehicle access or facilities. The site was notified on 2 October 1988, being of interest for being "one of the best examples of fen habitat in the Vale of York."

Mar Field Fen SSSI is not to be confused with Marfield Wetlands nature reserve which contains lakes, and lies to the west of the SSSI. Unlike the SSSI, Marfield Wetlands has a car park, bird hides and public facilities.

== Significant site content ==
=== Flora ===
On the fen meadow are many species of herbaceous plants, including spotted orchid, common bistort, greater bird's foot trefoil, common valerian, marsh hawksbeard, wild angelica, ragged robin and meadowsweet. These grow beside or among the "locally uncommon" blunt-flowered rush and greater tussock-sedge. Other fen plants here include common reed (Phragmites australis), jointed rush, hairy sedge and lesser pond sedge. Within the site there is also a drier calcareous grassland with its own flora.

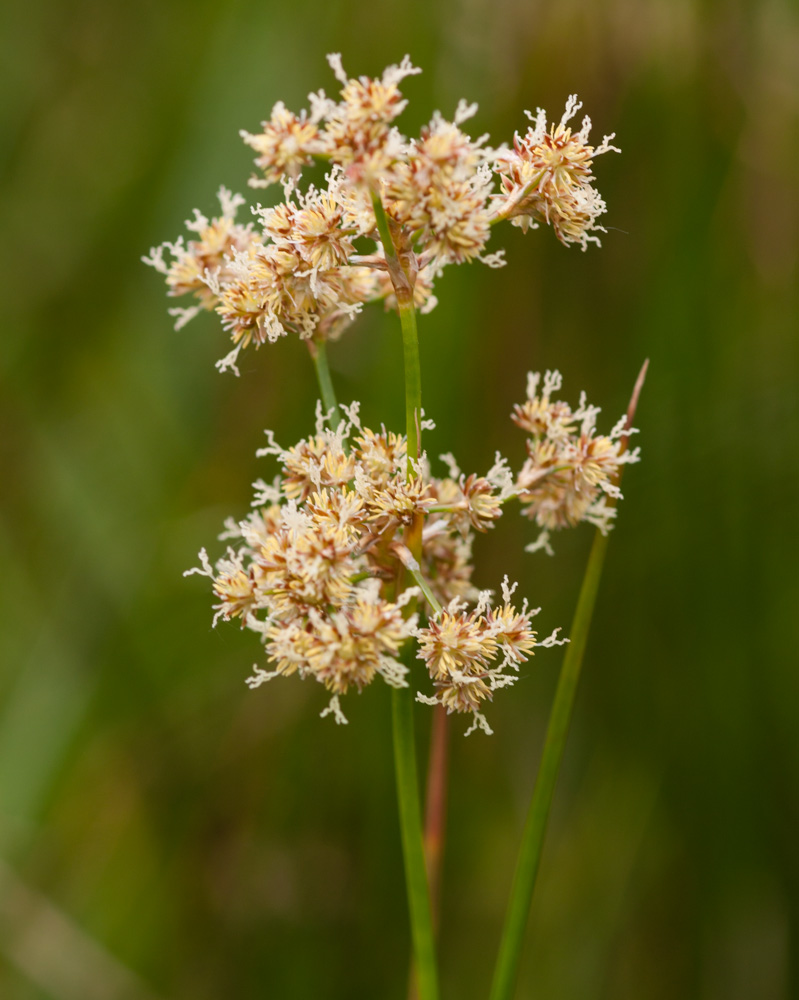
Blunt-flowered rush

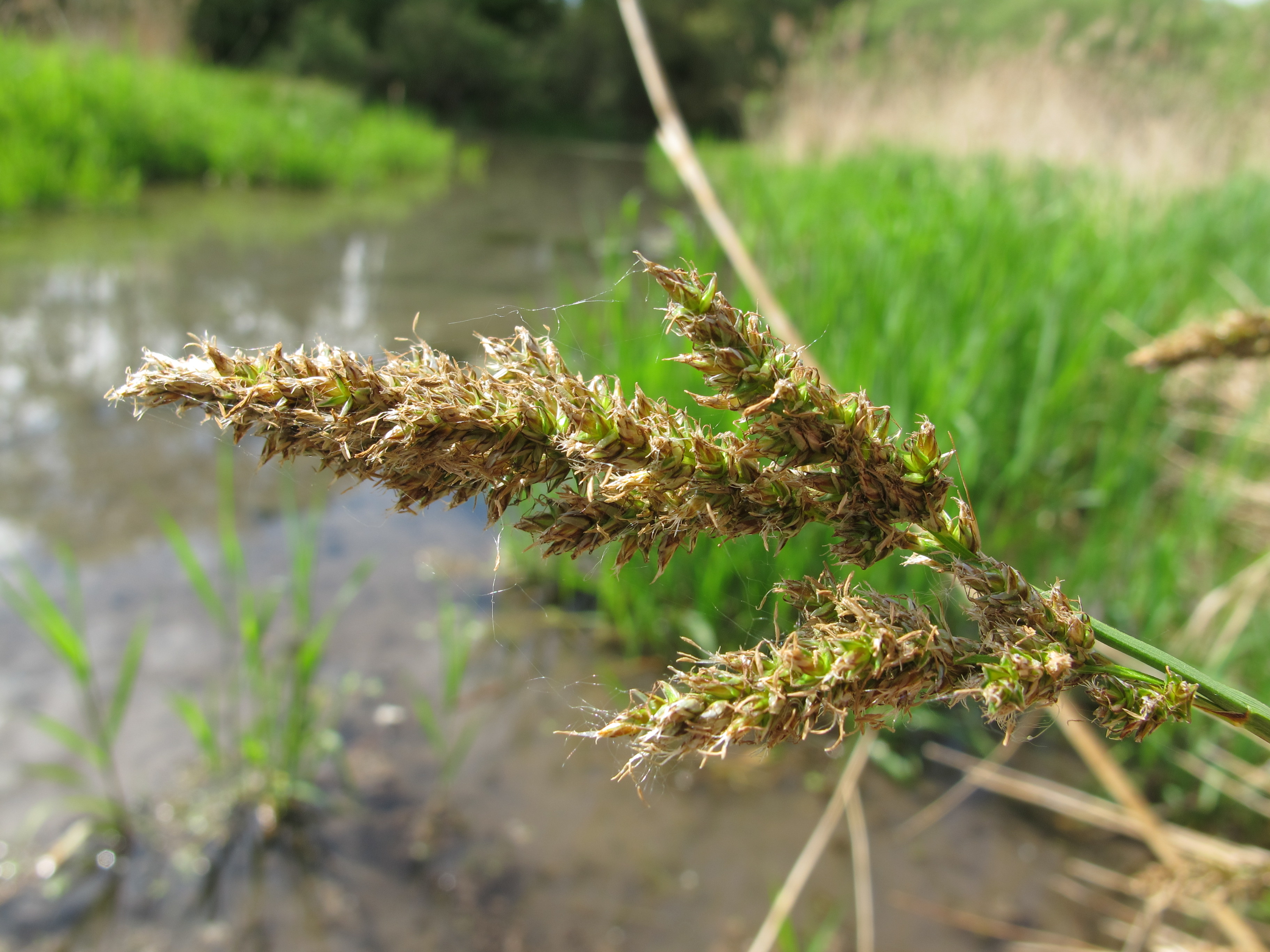
Greater tussock-sedge

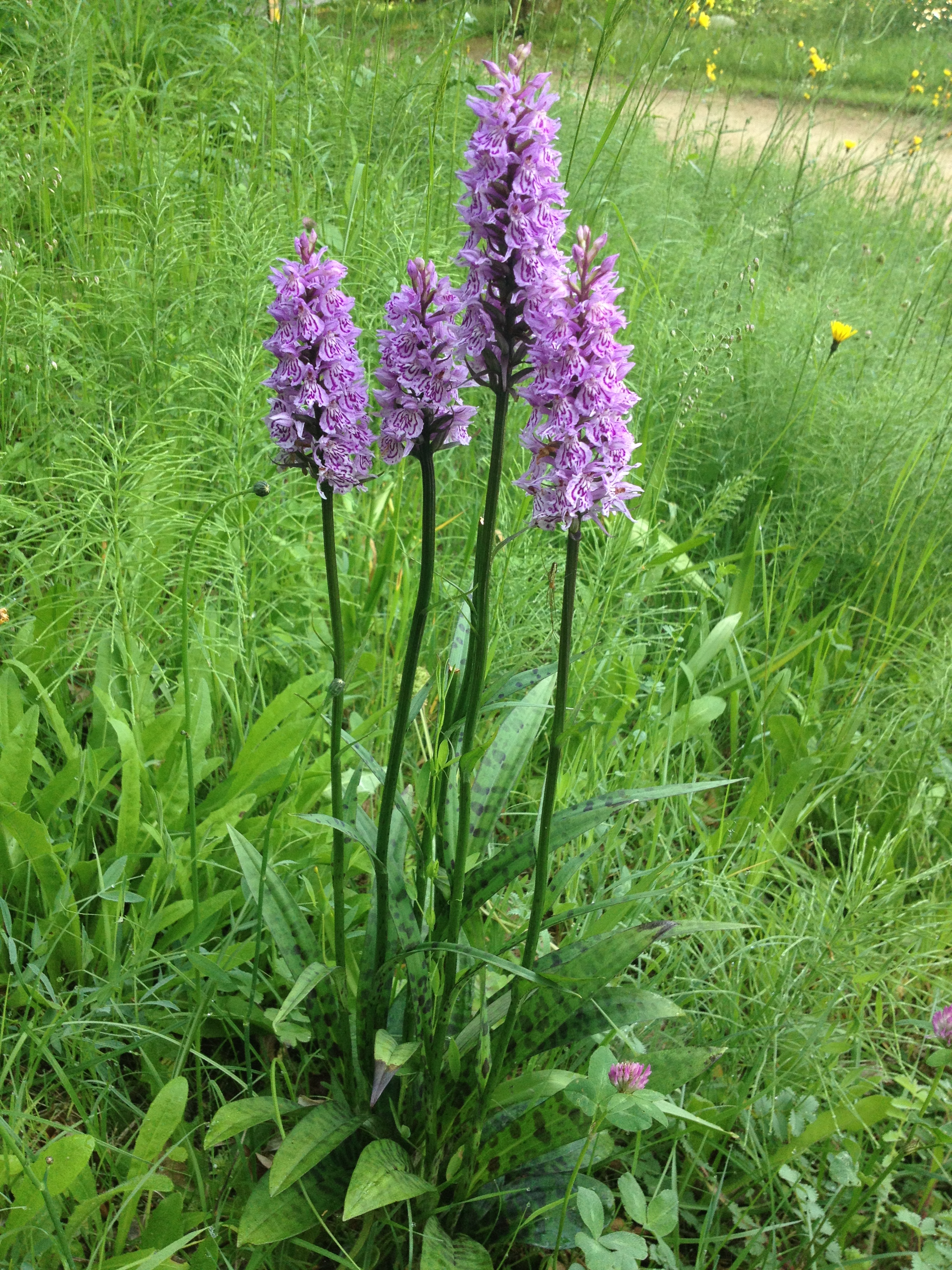
Spotted orchid

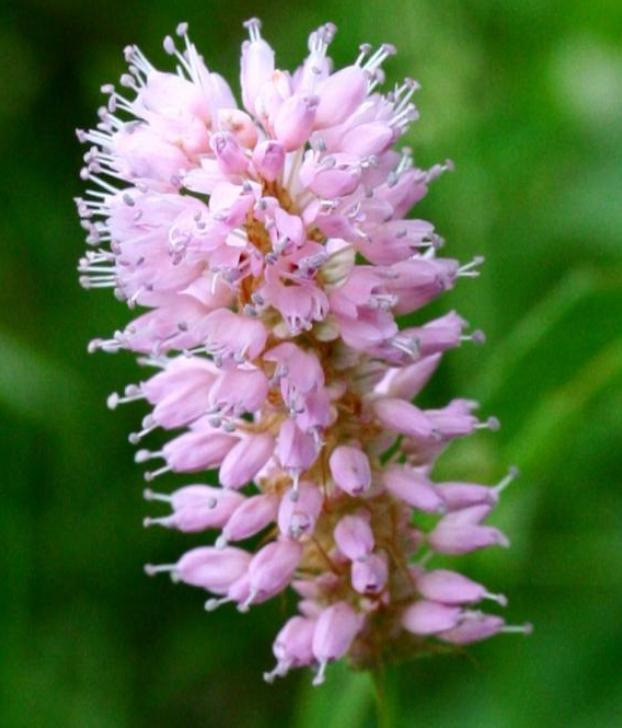
Common bistort

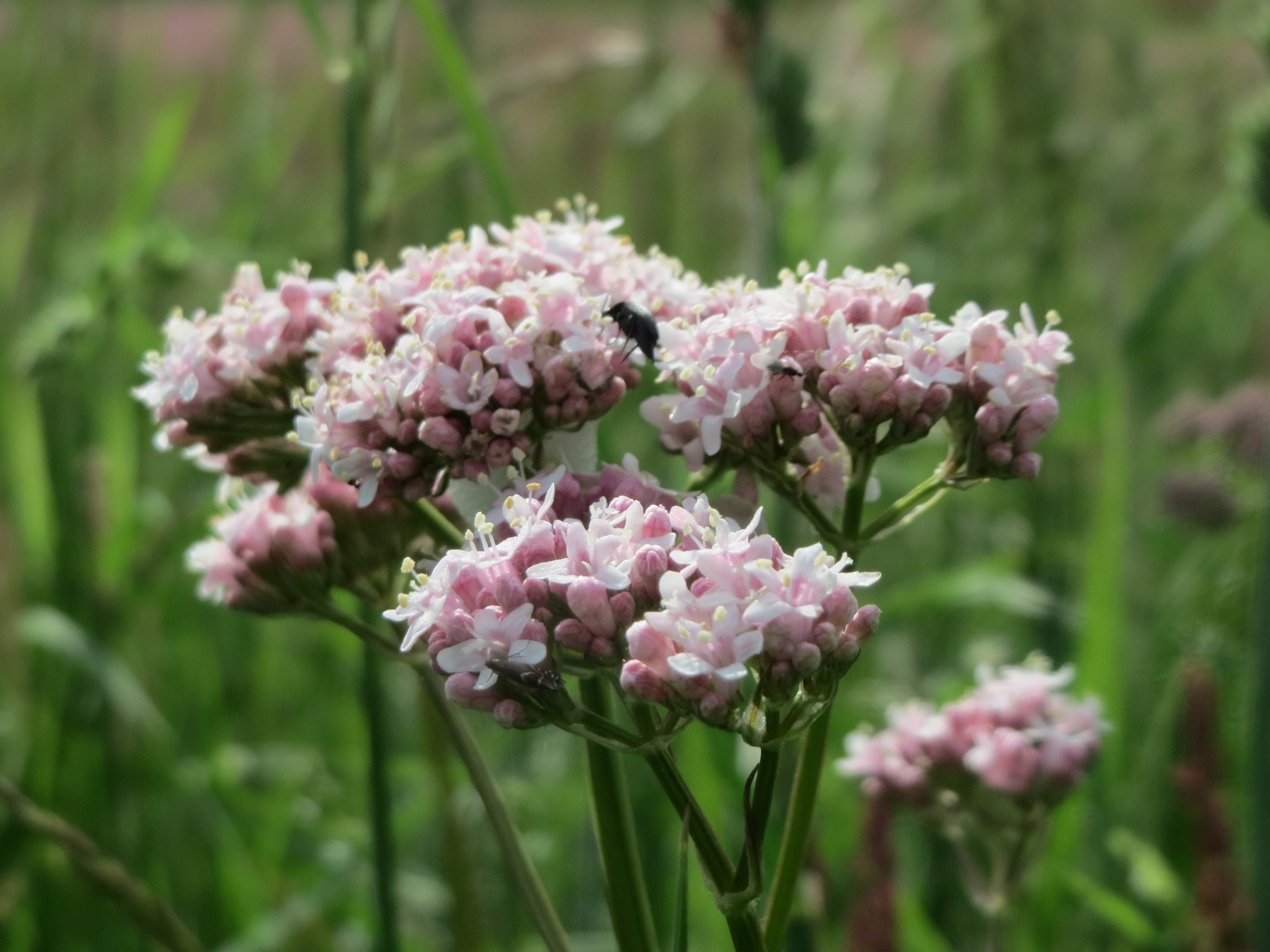
Common valerian

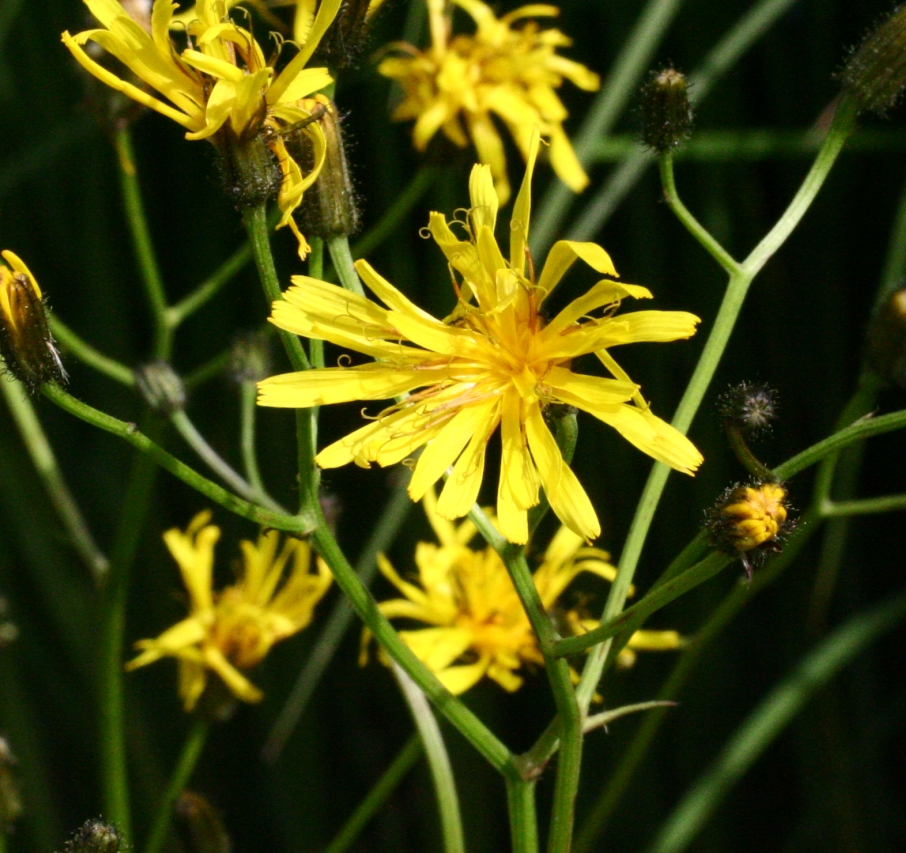
Marsh hawksbeard

At the north end of the site there is "flushed ground," or land with much seepage from the aquifer; some of its plants are "particularly scarce and localised." For example, there is the brown moss Drepanocladus revolvens and tussocks of purple moor-grass. There are also tussocks of bog rush, and on these tussocks are common butterwort and flea sedge. The fen spring-lines have their own special plants: broad-leaved cottongrass (Eriophorum latifolium) which is classed as "uncommon", bogbean, early marsh orchid, marsh valerian (Valeriana dioica), glaucous sedge, carnation sedge and long-stalked yellow sedge (Carex lepidocarpa).

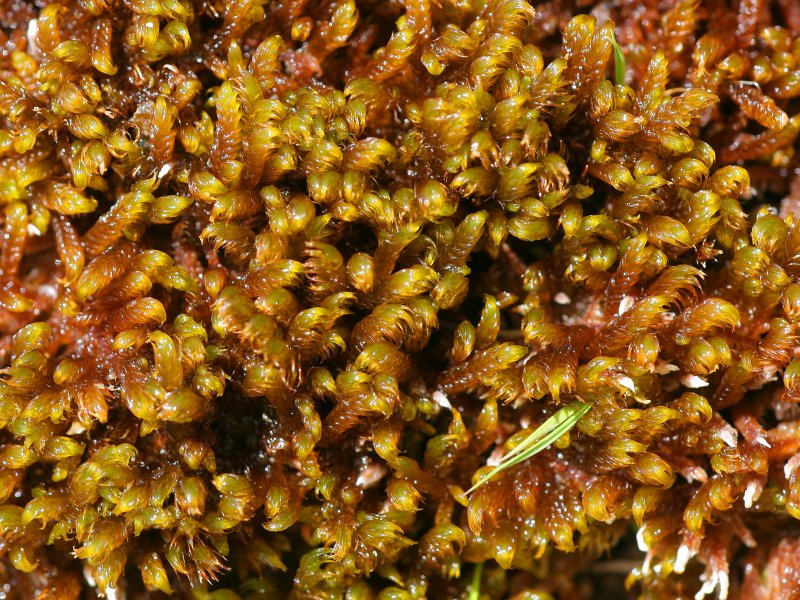
Brown moss Drepanocladus revolvens

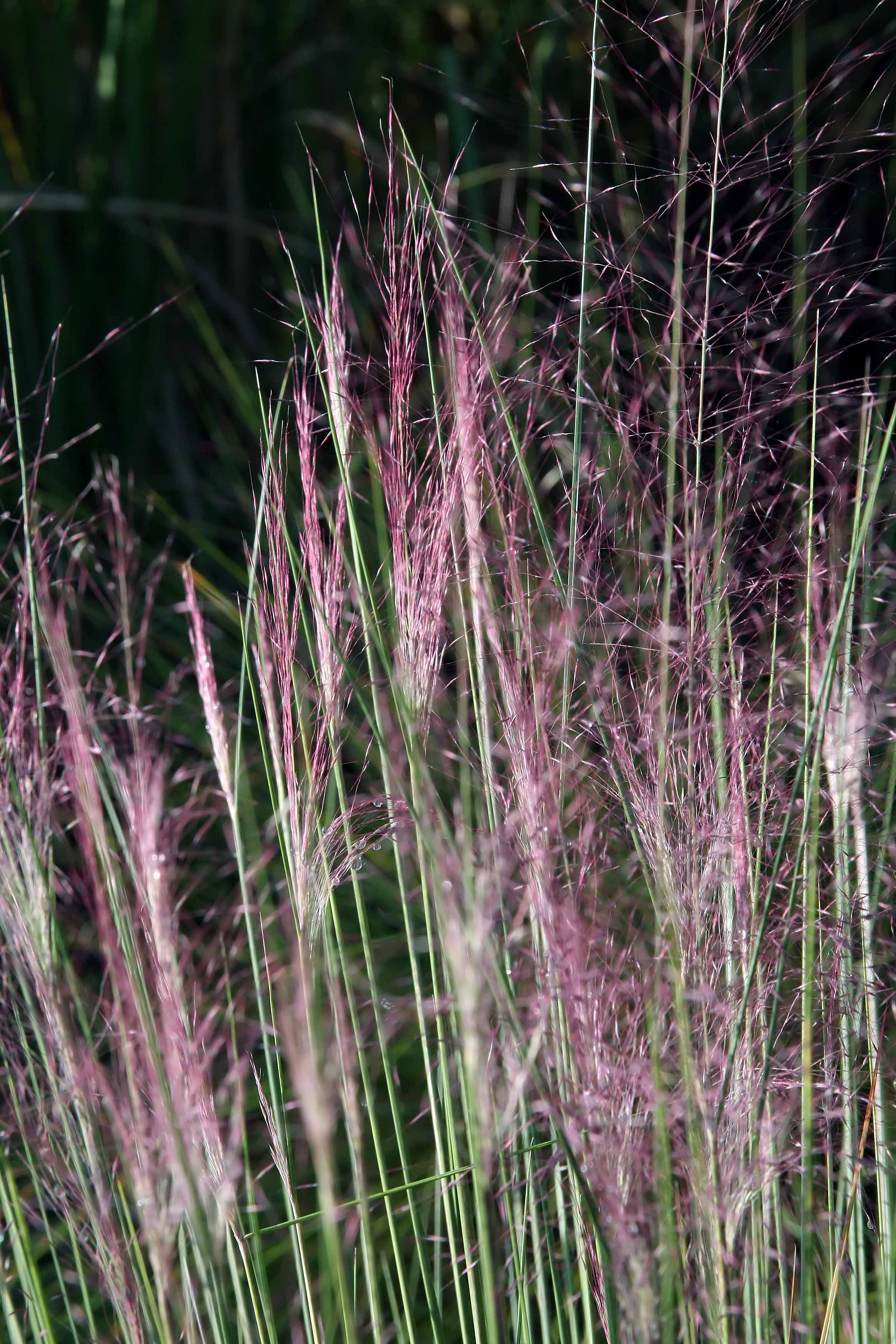
Purple moor-grass

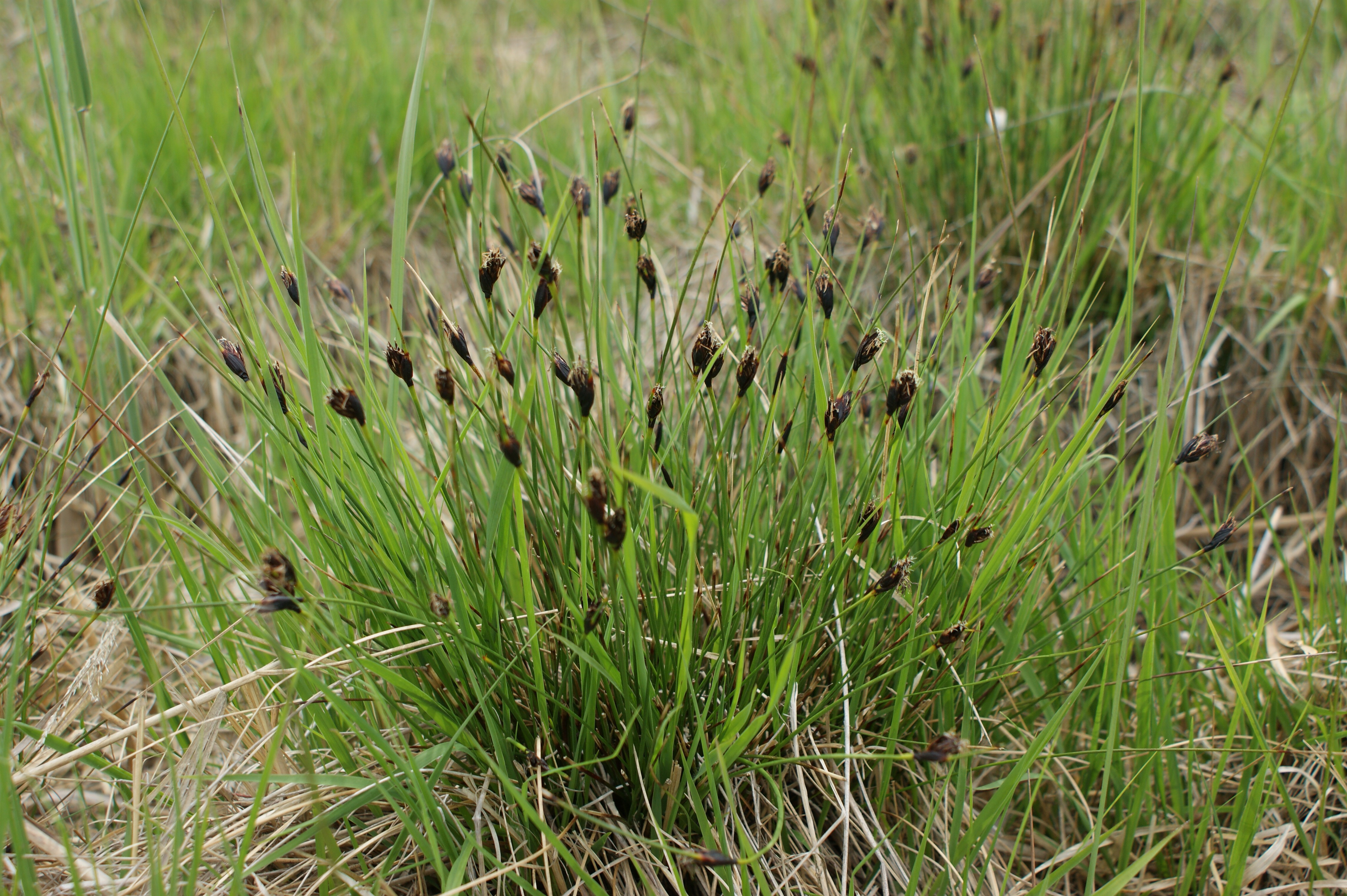
Bog rush

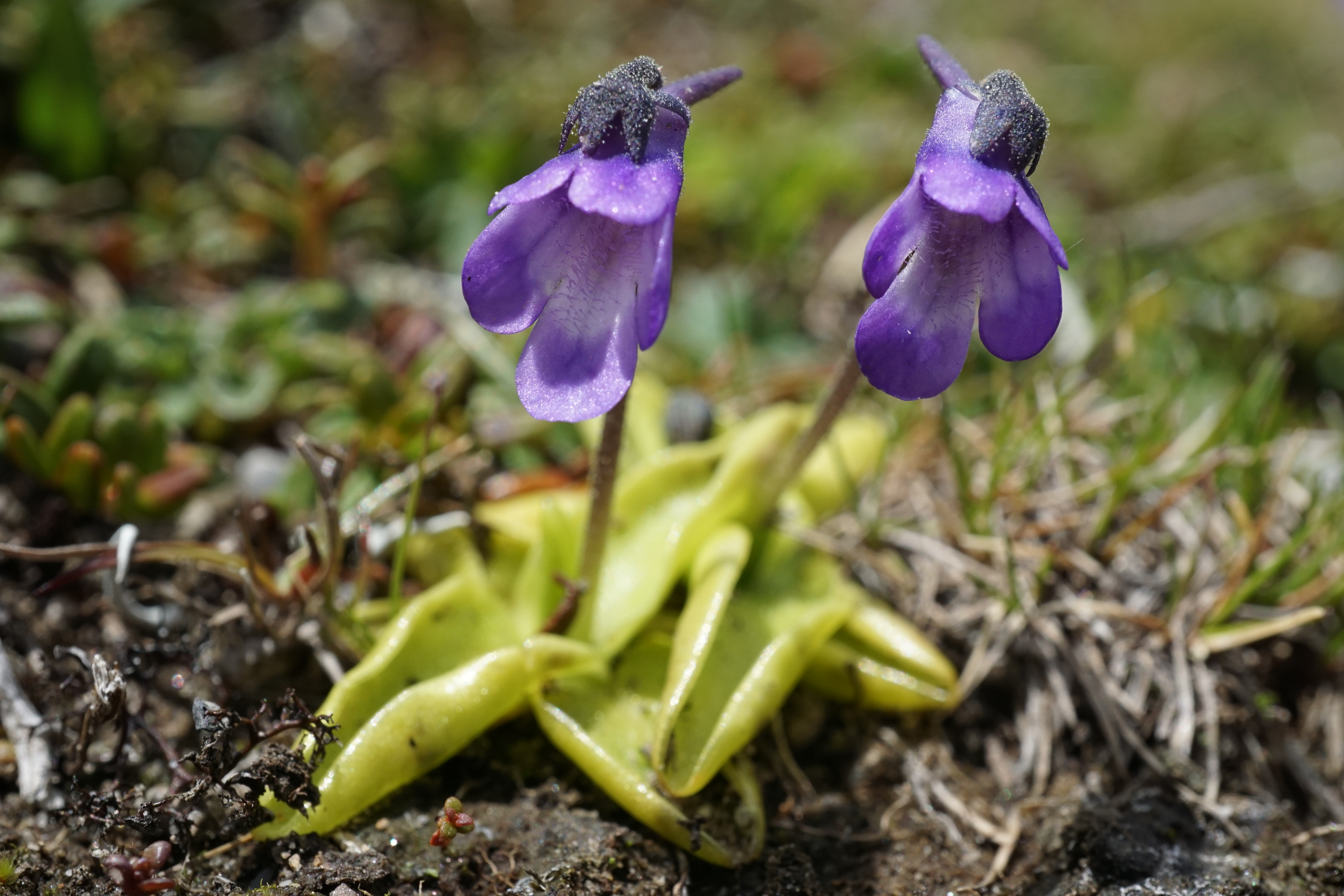
Common butterwort

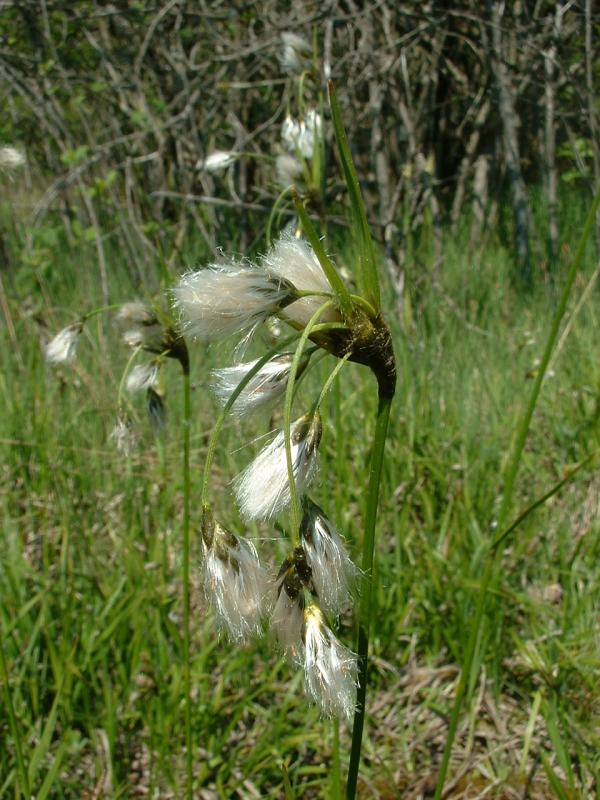
Broad-leaved cottongrass (Eriophorum latifolium)

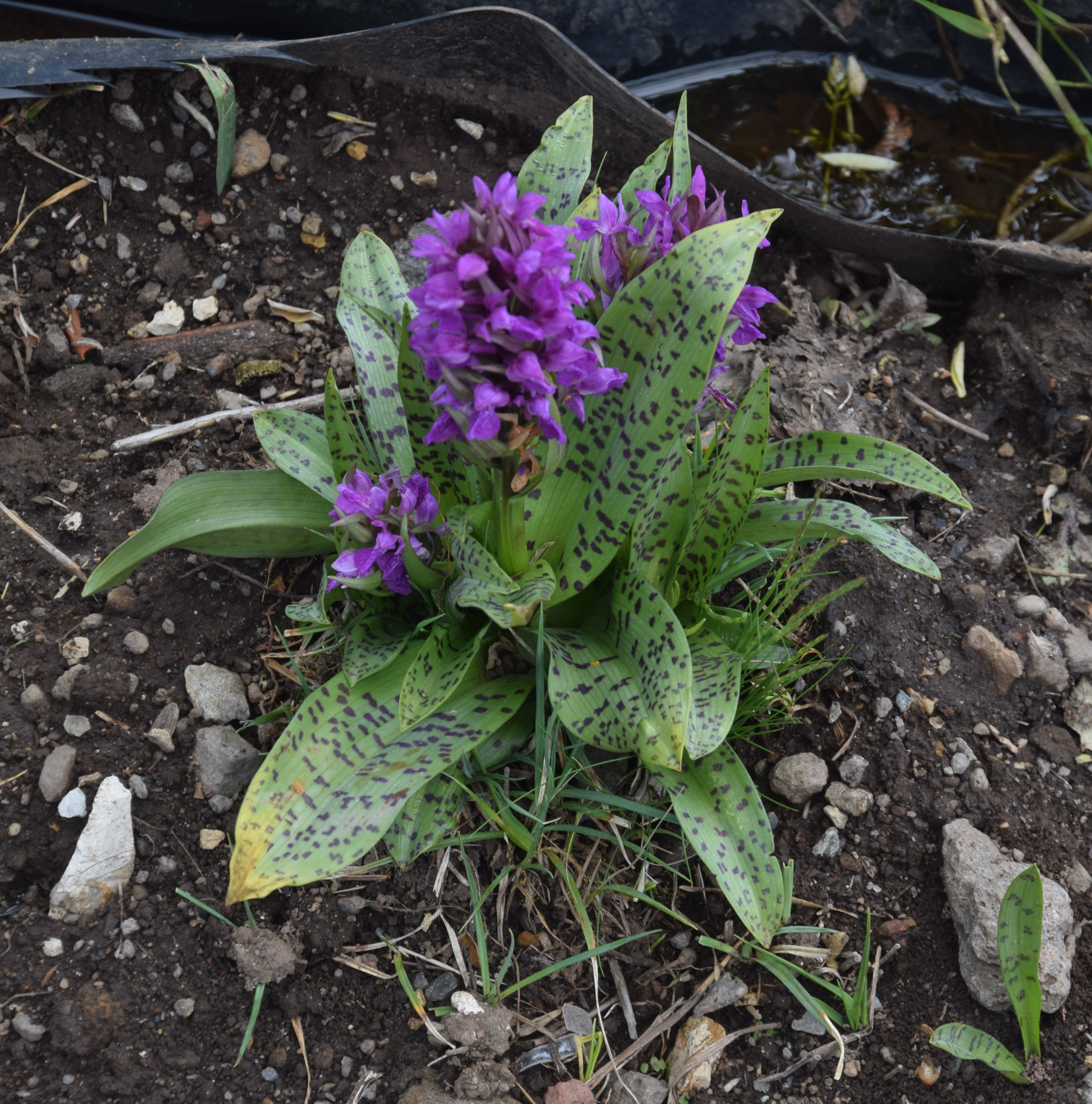
Early marsh orchid

Where the fen meadow and woodland carr meet, there is giant bellflower, marsh horsetail, hemp agrimony, yellow iris or flag, marsh marigold and meadowsweet. In drier places under the trees are: wood anemone, enchanter's nightshade and dog's mercury. Above them in the woodland understorey are guelder rose and grey willow or common sallow. The woodland carr itself has been partially planted with pine and poplar, but the remaining natural or original canopy is ash and alder.

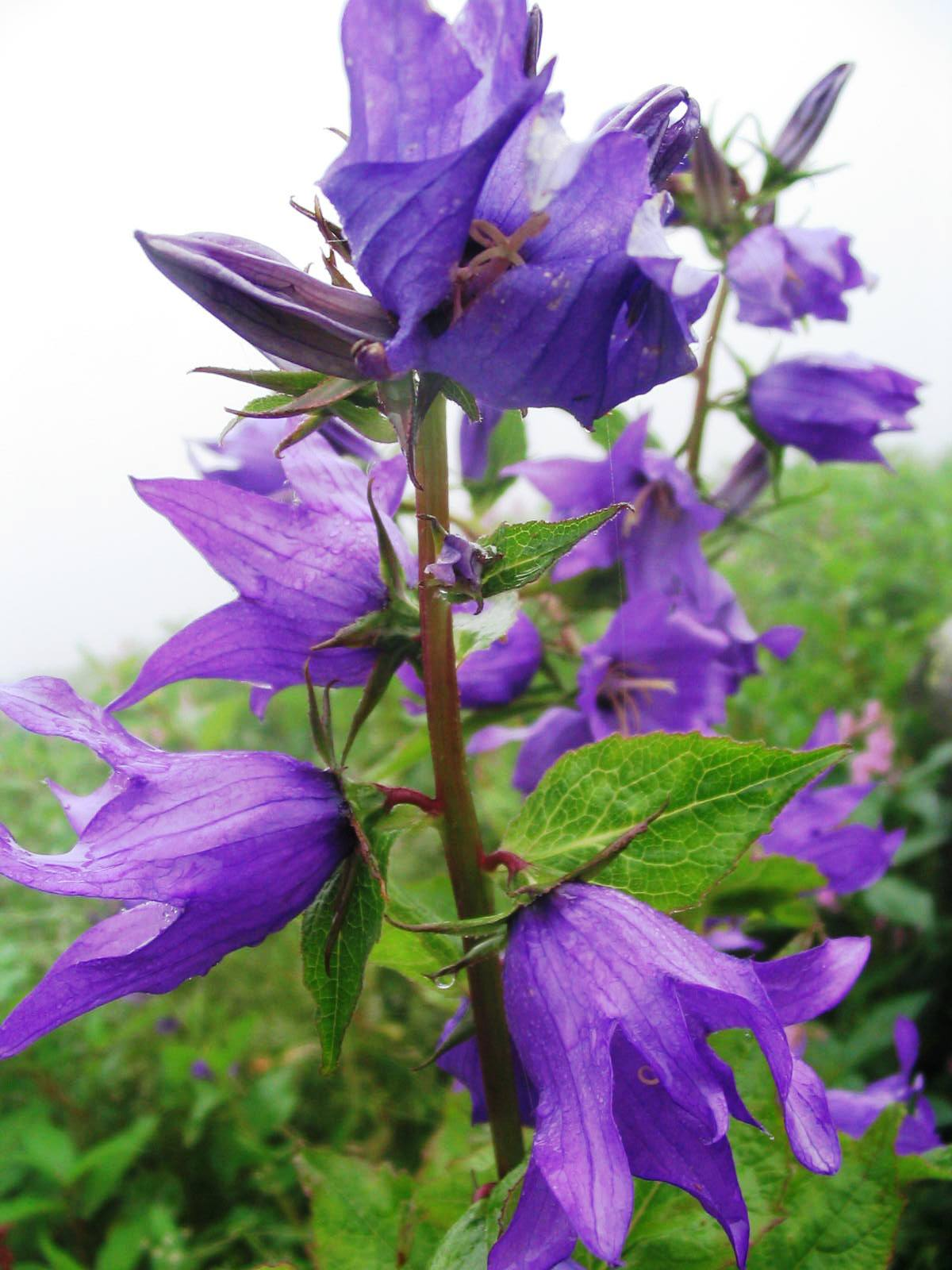
Giant bellflower

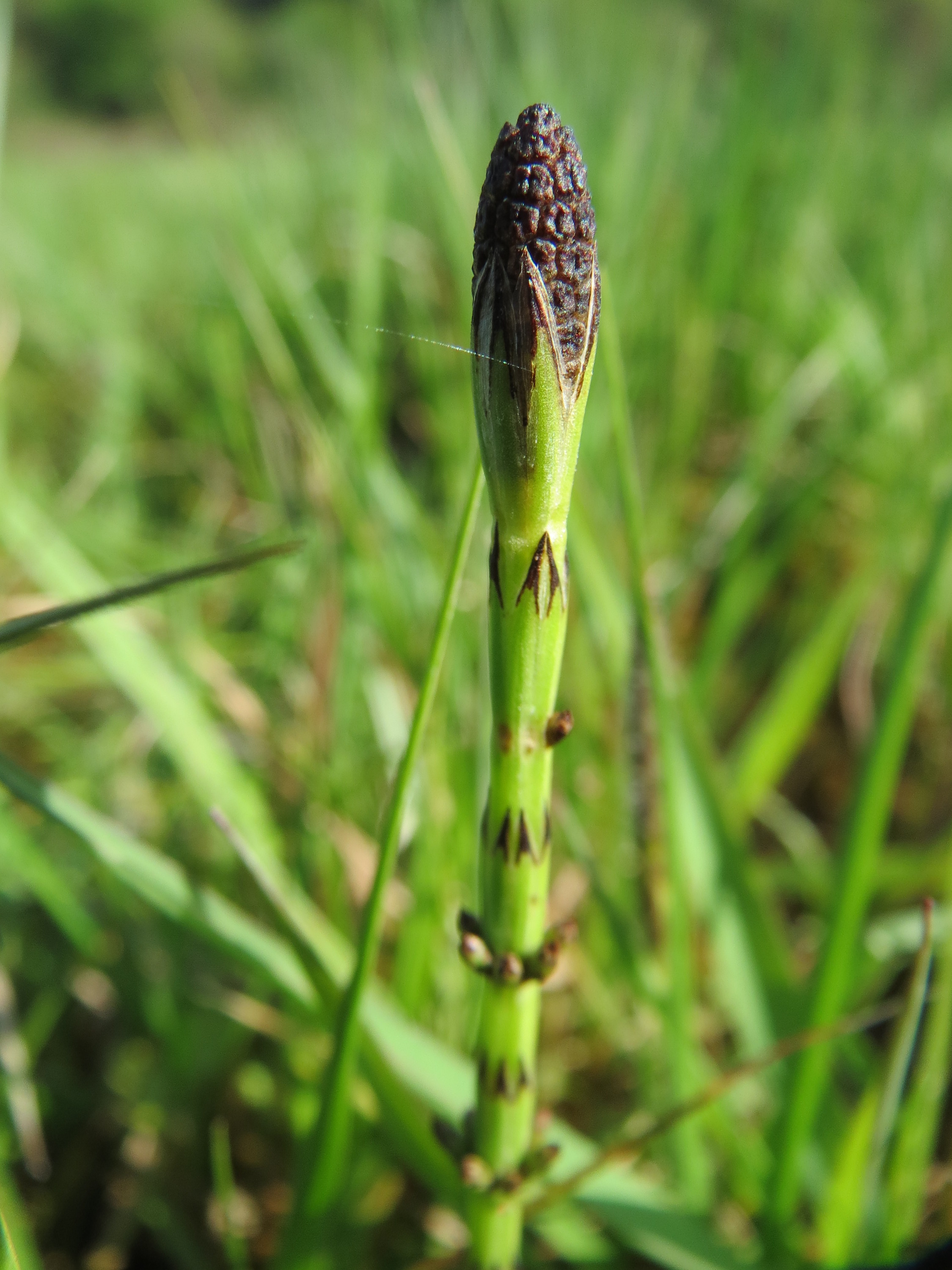
Marsh horsetail

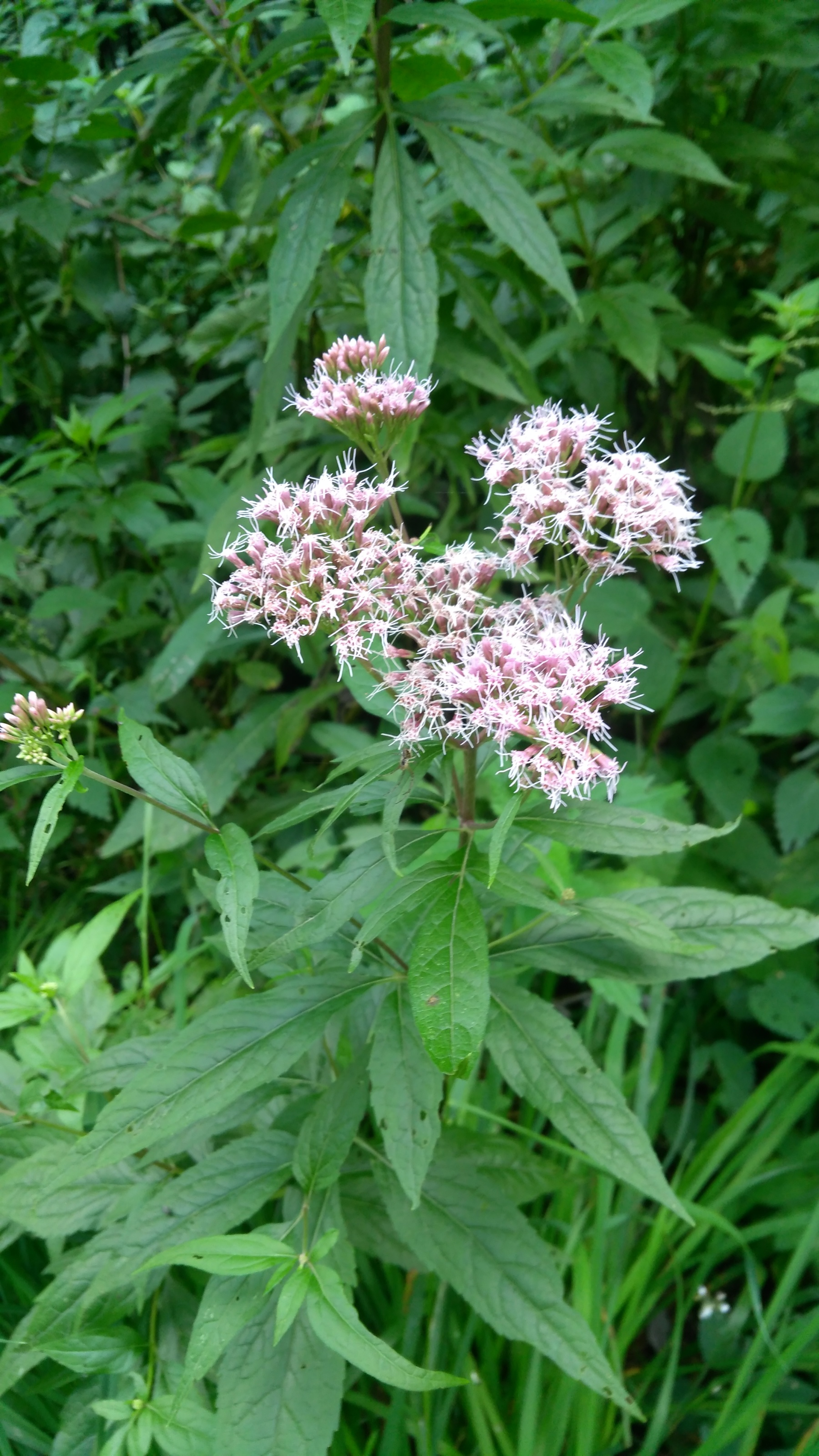
Hemp agrimony

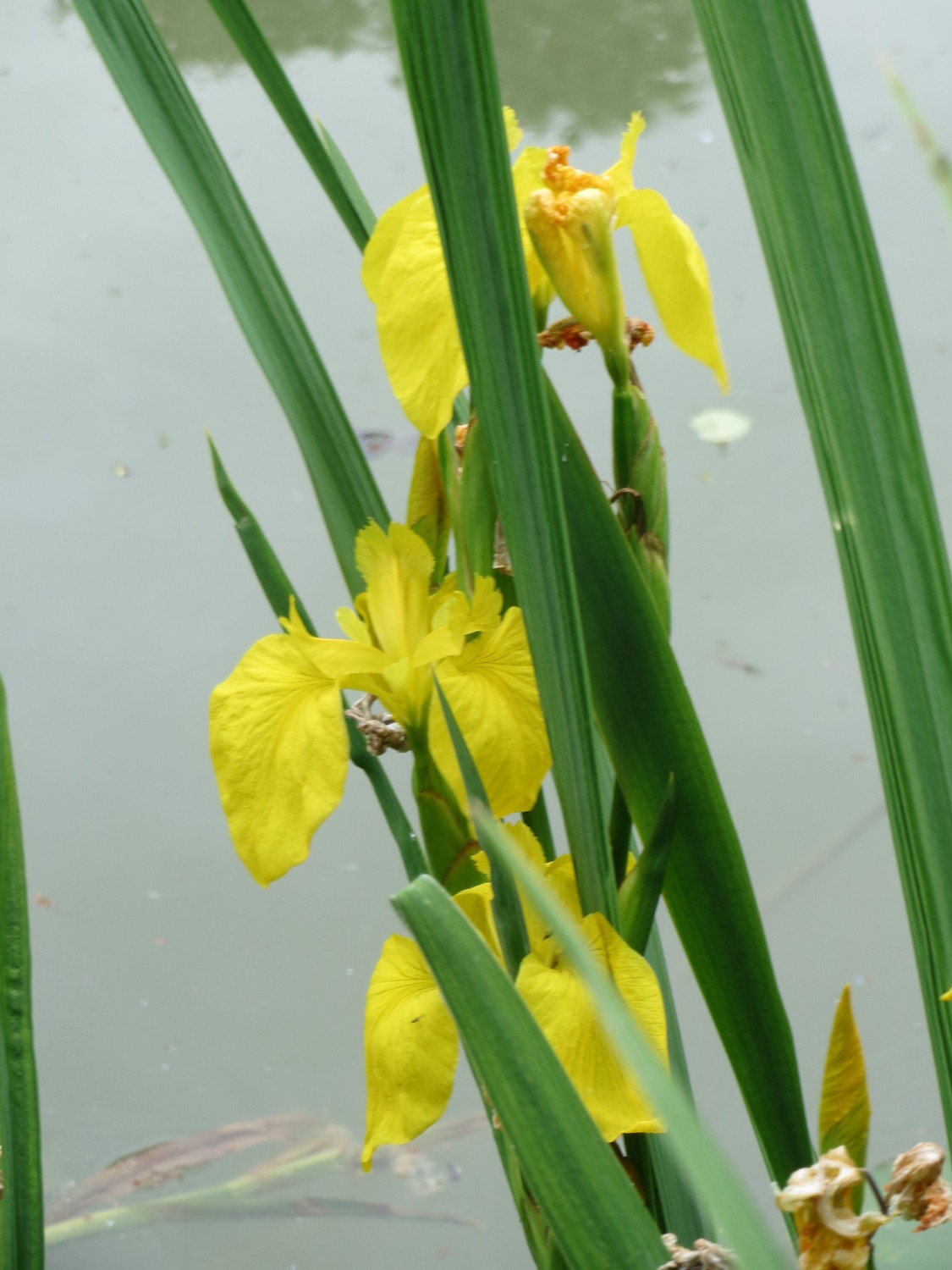
Yellow iris or flag

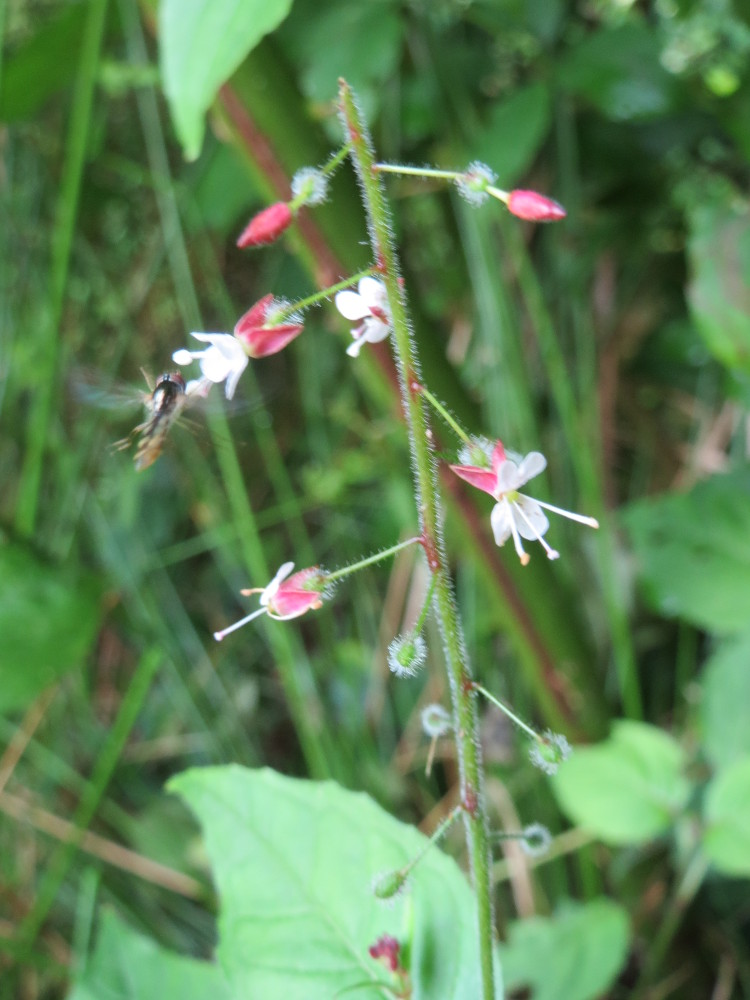
Enchanter's nightshade

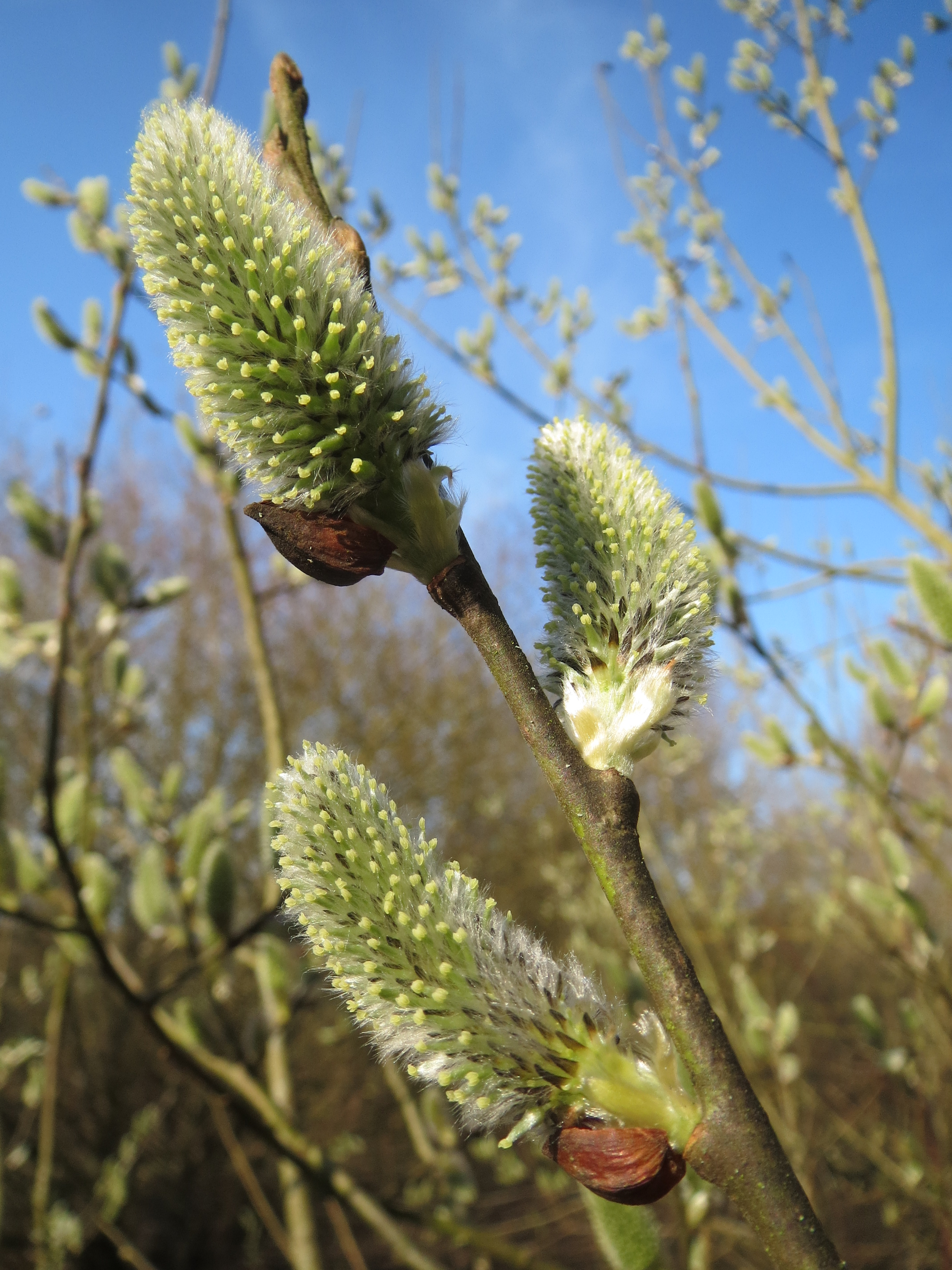
Grey willow or common sallow catkins

== Maintenance ==
In the woodland carr, minimum interference with natural growth and die-back is recommended, because fallen trees and regrowth will encourage the natural development of diverse habitats, such as glades, areas of young trees, and a mixture of light and shade, and shelter or exposure to wind. It may sometimes be necessary to cut back scrub if the woodland encroaches onto meadow, or to coppice trees to open up the area to light or to prevent trees from falling. Public access should be restricted to protect breeding wildlife or for the sake of public safety.

The flush and spring fen area should be protected from potential risk of commercial water abstraction which would deplete the aquifer, and from agricultural fertiliser or landfill pollution. All of these would disrupt the chemical balance in the aquifer and consequently in the soil, and that in turn would encourage rank grasses, and cause depletion of specialised fen plants. The quality of fen biodiversity should be monitored for signs of change. Light autumn grazing and trampling by cattle is beneficial, so long as the land is not enriched by cattle dung or feed. Moderate trampling may break down leaf litter and create scattered areas of bare soil which would encourage bryophytes and some invertebrates. Drains should not interfere with flushes and springs, nor should they cause any drying-out of land. At this particular site there is necessary incoming water from an adjacent quarry, and that should not be withheld, diverted or obstructed.

The calcareous meadow area requires more maintenance than the wood and fen. To prevent build-up of rank grasses, dead vegetation and scrub, light annual grazing and trampling by cattle is recommended. The aim is to "keep a relatively open sward without causing excessive poaching" and a varied habitat, including perhaps a controlled amount of scrub. Pesticides, herbicides and fertiliser are strongly discouraged. Rabbit damage is a problem on this site, and should be controlled where possible.

== Development and risk assessment ==
The site was assessed by Natural England in May and August 2012. The 3.1179 hectares (0.03118 km^{2}; 0.01204 sq mi) "broadleaved, mixed and yew woodland (lowland)" area was judged to be in favourable condition, having "good ground flora and regeneration." The 5.763 hectares (0.0576 km^{2}; 0.0223 sq mi) lowland fen, marsh and swamp area was judged "unfavourable and recovering," although no details were given.

Regarding future mining of limestone between 2025 and 2030, Gebdykes Quarry applied for a 25.8-hectare (64-acre) extension of the quarry across agricultural land. The potential effect on Mar Field Fen SSSI was considered in relation to that. North Yorkshire County Council confirmed that Mar Field Fen SSSI would be considered in any future local request for planning permission that might affect the site. North Yorkshire County Council's Minerals and Waste Joint Plan 2016–2030 took Mar Field Fen SSSI into consideration regarding possible effects of all potential local requirements for agricultural and commercial exploitation of land in the area. Yorkshire Water's drought plan for 2019 considered the potential permanent effect of water extraction on Mar Field Fen SSSI in the case of future drought and found it to be moderate and adverse.

== See also ==
Other SSSIs in the Ripon and Harrogate region are: Bishop Monkton Ings, Brimham Rocks, Cow Myers, Farnham Mires, Hack Fall Wood, Hay-a-Park, Quarry Moor, and Ripon Parks.
