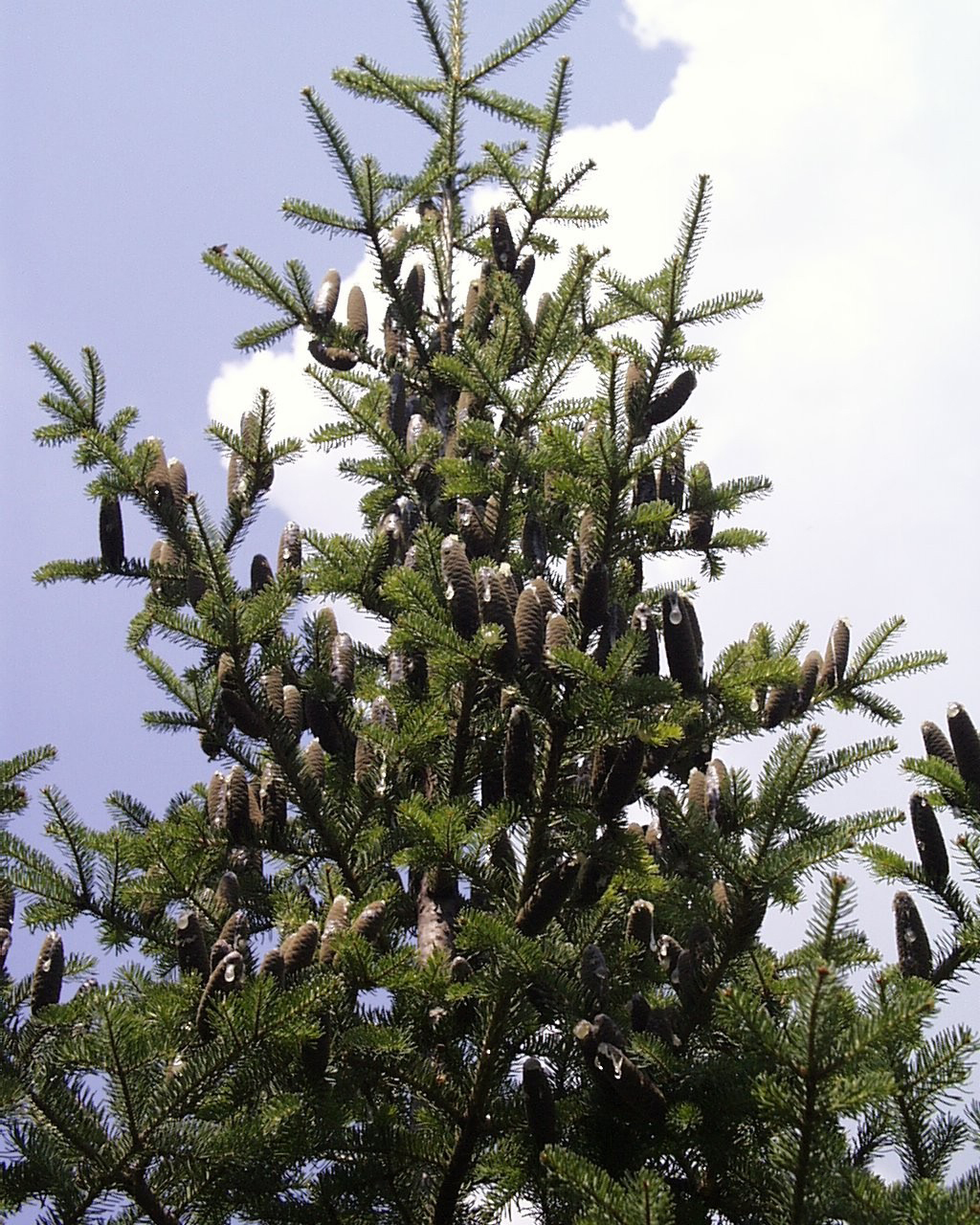
- Tree with cones

Conservation status
- Least Concern (IUCN 3.1)

Scientific classification
- Kingdom: Plantae
- Clade: Tracheophytes
- Clade: Gymnosperms
- Division: Pinophyta
- Class: Pinopsida
- Order: Pinales
- Family: Pinaceae
- Genus: Abies
- Species: A. balsamea

Binomial name
- Abies balsamea (L.) Mill.

Varieties
- Abies balsamea var. balsamea; Abies balsamea var. phanerolepis Fernald
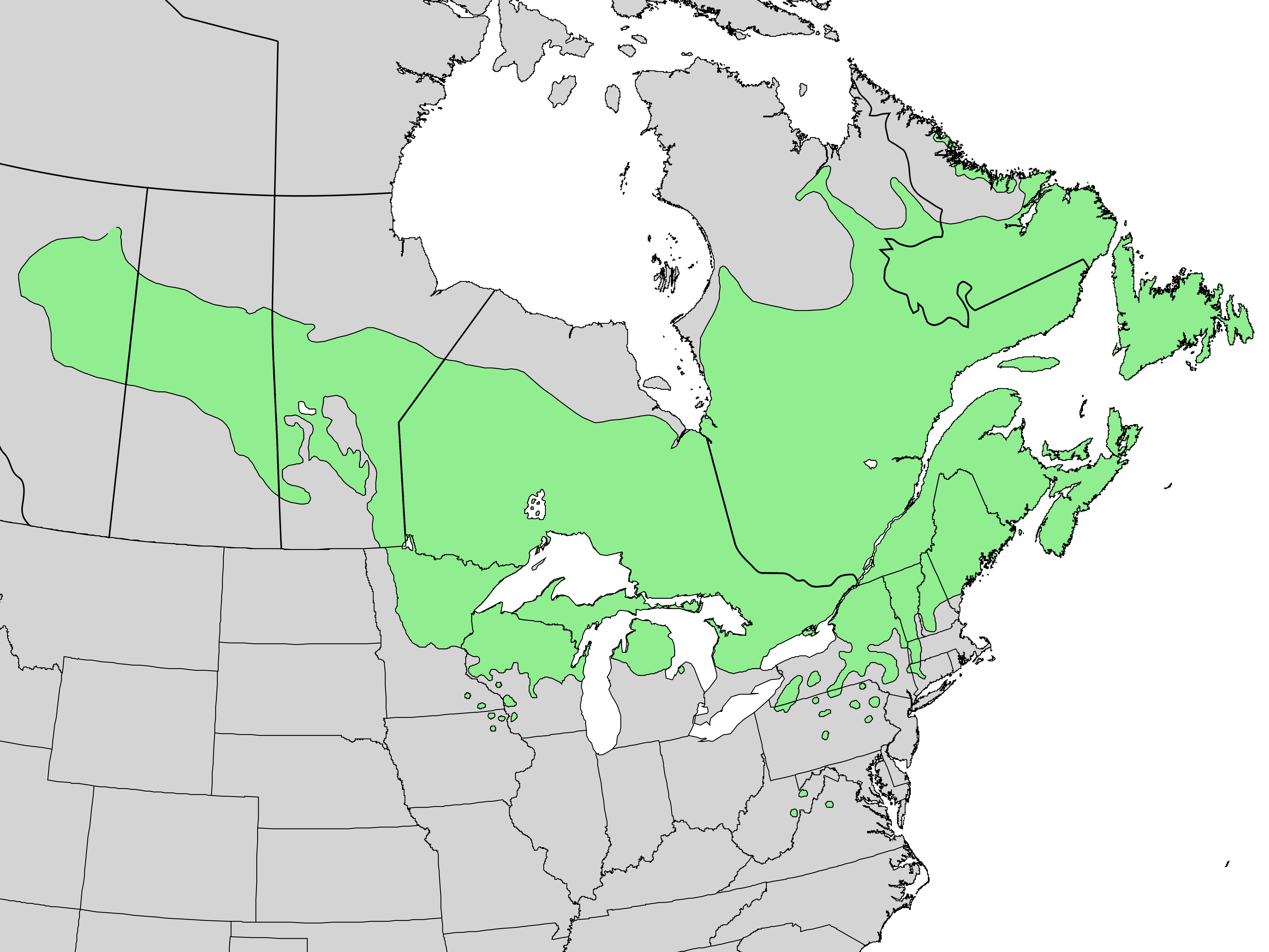
- Range

Synonyms
- Peuce balsamea (L.) Rich.; Picea balsamea (L.) Loudon; Pinus balsamea L.; Pinus taxifolia L.; synonyms of var. balsamea: Abies balsamea var. brachylepis Willk.; Abies balsamea f. hudsonia (Jacques) Fernald & Weath.; Abies balsamea var. hudsonia (Jacques) H.J.Veitch; Abies balsamea var. longifolia Loudon; Abies balsamea var. macrocarpa A.H.Kent; Abies balsamea f. nana (J.Nelson) Beissn.; Abies balsamea var. nana (J.Nelson) Carrière; Abies balsamifera Michx.; Abies fraseri var. hudsonia (Jacques) Carrière; Abies fraseri var. nana Lindl. & Gordon; Abies hudsonia Jacques; Abies minor Duhamel ex Gordon & Glend.; Picea aromatica Carrière; Picea balsamea var. longifolia Loudon; Picea balsamea var. nana J.Nelson; Picea fraseri var. hudsonia (Jacques) Knight & Perry; Picea hudsonia (Jacques) F.Scott; Pinus balsamea var. longifolia (Loudon) Endl.; synonyms of var. phanerolepis: Abies balsamea f. phanerolepis (Fernald) Rehder; Abies balsamea subsp. phanerolepis (Fernald) A.E.Murray; Abies intermedia Fulling; Abies phanerolepis (Fernald) T.S.Liu

= Abies balsamea =

Balsam fir

Species of conifer tree

Abies balsamea or balsam fir is a North American fir, native to most of eastern and central Canada (Newfoundland west to central Alberta) and the northeastern United States (Minnesota east to Maine, and south in the Appalachian Mountains to West Virginia).

== Description ==
Balsam fir is a small to medium-size evergreen tree typically 14–20 metres (46–66 ft) tall, occasionally reaching a height of 27 metres (89 ft). The narrow conic crown consists of dense, dark-green leaves. The bark on young trees is smooth, grey, and with resin blisters (which tend to spray when ruptured), becoming rough and fissured or scaly on old trees. The leaves are flat and needle-like, 15 to 30 mm (5/8 to 1 1/8 in) long, dark green above often with a small patch of stomata near the tip, and two white stomatal bands below, and a slightly notched tip. They are arranged spirally on the shoot, but with the leaf bases twisted so that the leaves appear to be in two more-or-less horizontal rows on either side of the shoot. The needles become shorter and thicker the higher they are on the tree. The seed cones are erect, 40 to 80 mm (1 1/2 to 3 1/4 in) long, dark purple, ripening brown and disintegrating to release the winged seeds in September.

=== Medicinal ===
For thousands of years Native Americans used balsam fir for medicinal and therapeutic purposes. The needles are eaten directly off the tree by many animals and humans. Higher content dosage is ingested in tea. Balsam fir contains vitamin C, which has been studied for its effects on bacterial and viral infections.

Balsam fir's essential oil and some of its compounds have shown efficacy against ticks.

=== Reproduction ===
The male reproductive organs generally develop more rapidly and appear sooner than the female organs. The male organs contain microsporangia which divide to form sporogenous tissue, composed of cells which become archesporial cells. These develop into microspores, or pollen-mother cells, once they are rounded and filled with starch grains. When the microspores undergo meiosis in the spring, four haploid microspores are produced which eventually become pollen grains. Once the male strobilus has matured the microsporangia are exposed at which point the pollen is released.

The female megasporangiate is larger than the male. It contains bracts and megasporophylls, each of which contains two ovules, arranged in a spiral. These then develop a nucellus in which a mother cell is formed. Meiosis occurs and a megaspore is produced as the first cell of the megagametophyte. As cell division takes place the nucleus of the megaspore thickens, and cell differentiation occurs to produce prothallial tissue containing an ovum. The remaining undifferentiated cells then form the endosperm.

When the male structure releases its pollen grains, some fall onto the female strobilus and reach the ovule. At this point the pollen tube begins to generate, and eventually the sperm and egg meet at which point fertilization occurs.

== Varieties ==
There are two varieties:

- Abies balsamea var. balsamea (balsam fir) – bracts subtending seed scales short, not visible on the closed cones. Most of the species' range.
- Abies balsamea var. phanerolepis (bracted balsam fir or Canaan fir) – bracts subtending seed scales longer, visible on the closed cone. The southeast of the species' range, from southernmost Quebec to West Virginia. The name Canaan fir derives from one of its native localities, the Canaan Valley in West Virginia. Some botanists regard this variety as a natural hybrid between balsam fir and Fraser fir (Abies fraseri), which occurs further south in the Appalachian mountains. This produces a slight change in color, making it appear similar to a true Fraser Fir.

== Ecology ==
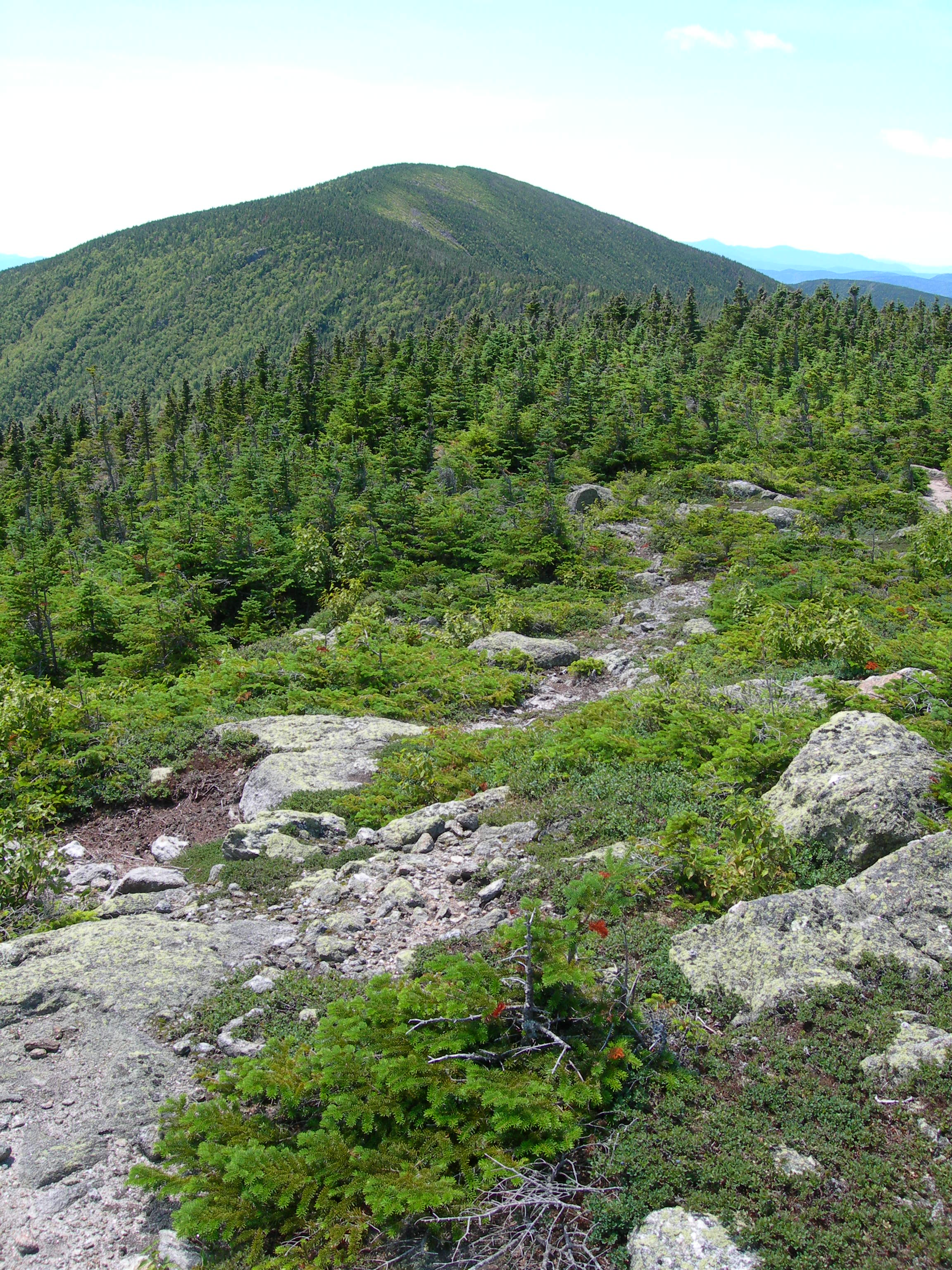
Balsam fir krummholz on Mount Hight, New Hampshire

Balsam firs are very shade tolerant, and tend to grow in cool climates, ideally with a mean annual temperature of 40 °F (4 °C), with consistent moisture at their roots. Low moisture and high temperature have been identified as important factors restricting its range. They typically grow in the following four forest types:

- Swamp – swamp forest types never completely dry out, so balsam firs have constant access to water. The ground is covered in sphagnum and other mosses. In swamps, balsam firs grow densely and slowly, and are slender.
- Flat – sometimes referred to as "dry swamps", these areas are better drained than swamps but still retain moisture well. Fern moss covers the ground and there is a possibility of ground rot. In flat areas balsam fir grows fast, tall, and large, mixed with red spruce.
- Hardwood slope – ground rot is common in this well-drained area, and leaf litter covers the forest floor. Balsam firs grow fast, tall, and large along with big hardwood trees such as yellow birch, sugar maple and beech.
- Mountain top – On mountain tops, stands of balsam fir occasionally develop fir waves. They often grow at an elevation of 760 to 1,520 m (2,500 to 5,000 ft) in pure strands, or in association with black spruce, white spruce, white birch, and trembling aspen. The development is similar to that in swamps with slow growth resulting in slender, short trees. Some of the low branches touch the ground, and may grow roots to produce an independent tree.

The foliage is browsed by moose and deer. The seeds are eaten by American red squirrels, grouse, and pine mice; the tree also provides food for crossbills and chickadees, as well as shelter for moose, snowshoe hares, white-tailed deer, ruffed grouse, and other small mammals and songbirds. The needles are eaten by some lepidopteran caterpillars, for example the Io moth (Automeris io).

Abies balsamea is one of the most cold-hardy trees known, surviving at temperatures as low as −45 °C (−49 °F) (USDA Hardiness Zone 2). Specimens even showed no ill effects when immersed in liquid nitrogen at −196 °C (−320.8 °F).

It is short-lived by conifer standards, the oldest specimen being 245 years old as of 1996. The tallest and widest specimen had a height of 31.7 metres (104 ft) and a DBH of 406 centimetres (160 in).

=== Conservation status ===
It is listed as endangered in Connecticut. This status applies to native populations only.

=== Pests ===
The balsam fir is the preferred main host of the eastern spruce budworm, which is a major destructive pest throughout the eastern United States and Canada. During cyclical population outbreaks, major defoliation of the balsam fir can occur, which may significantly reduce radial growth. This can kill the tree. An outbreak in Quebec in 1957 killed over 75% of balsam fir in some stands.

The needles of balsam fir can be infected by the fungus Delphinella balsameae.

Balsam fir is also the most susceptible tree in Eastern Canada to red heart rot, caused by the fungus Stereum sanguinolentum. This fungus causes the heartwood to decay and turn a red-brown colour, potentially killing the tree if the disease spreads sufficiently. This can be partially mitigated by avoiding bark damage when logging and mitigating sun scald by not thinning excessively.

== Cultivation ==
=== Christmas trees ===
Both varieties of the species are very popular as Christmas trees, particularly in the northeastern United States. Balsam firs cut for Christmas are typically grown on large plantations, not taken from the forest. The balsam fir is one of the greatest exports of Quebec and New England. It is celebrated for its rich green needles, natural conical shape, and needle retention after being cut, and it is notably the most fragrant of all Christmas tree varieties.

The balsam fir was used six times for the US Capitol Christmas Tree between 1964 and 2019.

=== Horticulture ===
Abies balsamea is also grown as an ornamental tree for parks and gardens. Very hardy down to −20 °C (−4 °F) or below, it requires a sheltered spot in full sun. The dwarf cultivar A. balsamea 'Hudson' (Hudson fir), grows to only 1 m (3.3 ft) tall by 1.5 m (4.9 ft) broad, and has distinctive blue-green foliage with pale undersides. It does not bear cones. It has gained the Royal Horticultural Society's Award of Garden Merit.

Other cultivars include:

- 'Angustata'
- 'Argentea'
- 'Brachylepis'
- 'Coerulea'
- 'Columnaris'
- 'Glauca'
- 'Globosa'
- 'Longifolia'
- 'Lutescens'
- 'Macrocarpa'
- 'Marginata'
- 'Nana'
- 'Nudicaulis'
- 'Paucifolia'
- 'Prostrata'
- 'Pyramidalis'
- 'Variegata'
- 'Versicolor'

== Other uses ==
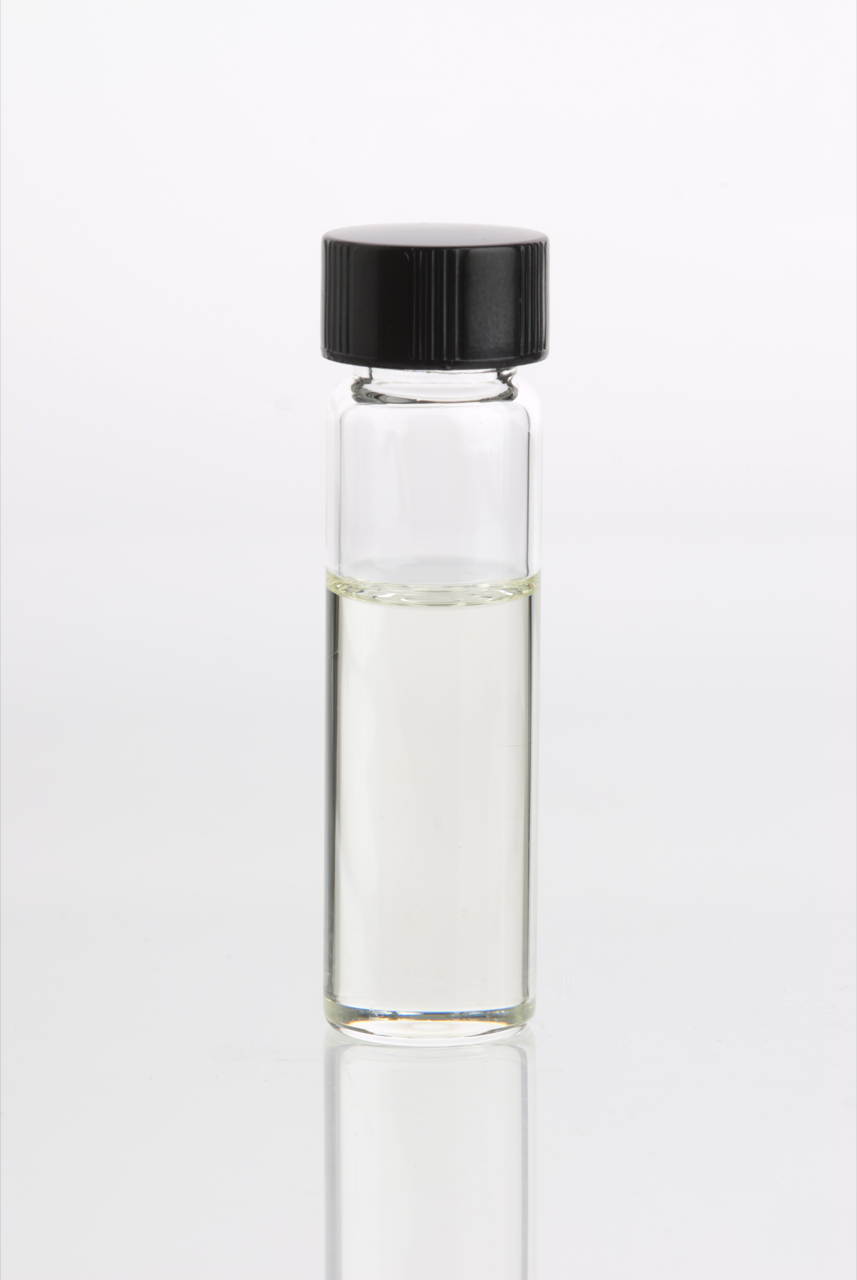
Balsam fir essential oil in clear glass vial

The resin is used to produce Canada balsam, and was traditionally used as a cold remedy and as a glue for glasses, optical instrument components, and for preparing permanent mounts of microscope specimens. Given its use as a traditional remedy and the relatively high ascorbic acid content of its needles, historian Jacques Mathieu has argued that the balsam fir was the "aneda" that cured scurvy during the second expedition into Canada of Jacques Cartier. The wood is milled for framing lumber (part of SPF lumber), siding and pulped for paper manufacture. Balsam fir oil is an EPA approved nontoxic rodent repellent. The balsam fir is also used as an air freshener and as incense.

=== Native American ethnobotany ===
Native Americans use it for a variety of medicinal purposes.

The Abenaki use the gum for slight itches and as an antiseptic ointment. They stuff the leaves, needles, and wood into pillows as a panacea.

The Algonquin people of Quebec apply a poultice of the gum to open sores, insect bites, boils and infections, use the needles as a sudatory for women after childbirth and for other purposes, use the roots for heart disease, use the needles to make a laxative tea, and use the needles for making poultices.

The Atikamekw chew the sap as a cold remedy, and use the boughs as mats for the tent floor.

The Cree use the pitch for menstrual irregularity, and take an infusion of the bark and sometimes the wood for coughs. They use the pitch and grease as an ointment for scabies and boils. They apply a poultice of pitch applied to cuts. They also use a decoction of pitch and sturgeon oil used for tuberculosis, and take an infusion of bark for tuberculosis. They also use the boughs to make brush shelters and use the wood to make paddles.

The Haudenosaunee use a steam from a decoction of branches as a bath for rheumatism and parturition, and ingest a decoction of the plant for rheumatism. They take a compound decoction for colds and coughs, sometimes mixing it with alcohol. They apply a compound decoction of the plant for cuts, sprains, bruises and sores. They apply a poultice of the gum and dried beaver kidneys for cancer. They also take a compound decoction in the early stages of tuberculosis, and they use the plant for bedwetting and gonorrhea.

The Innu people grate the inner bark and eat it to benefit their diet.

The Menominee use the inner bark as a seasoner for medicines, take an infusion of the inner bark for chest pain, and use the liquid balsam pressed from the trunk for colds and pulmonary troubles. They also use the inner bark as a poultice for unspecified illnesses. They also apply gum from plant blisters to sores.

The Miꞌkmaq use a poultice of inner bark for an unspecified purpose, use the buds, cones and inner bark for diarrhea, use the gum for burns, colds, fractures, sores and wounds, use the cones for colic, and use the buds as a laxative. They also use the bark used for gonorrhea and buds used as a laxative. They use the boughs to make beds, use the bark to make a beverage, and use the wood for kindling and fuel.

The Ojibwe melt the gum on warm stones and inhale the fumes for headache. They also use a decoction of the root as an herbal steam for rheumatic joints. They also combine the gum with bear's grease and use it as an ointment for hair. They use the needle-like leaves in as part of ceremony involving the sweat bath, and use the gum for colds and inhale the leaf smoke for colds. They use the plant as a cough medicine. The gum is used for sores and a compound containing leaves is used as wash. The liquid balsam from bark blisters is used for sore eyes. They boil the resin twice and add it to suet or fat to make a canoe pitch. The bark gum is taken for chest soreness from colds, applied to cuts and sores, and decoction of the bark is used to induce sweating. The bark gum is also taken for gonorrhea.

The Penobscot smear the sap over sores, burns, and cuts.

The Potawatomi use the needles to make pillows, believing that the aroma prevented one from getting a cold. They also use the balsam gum as a salve for sores, and take an infusion of the bark for tuberculosis and other internal afflictions.

The Wolastoqiyik use the juice of the plant as a laxative, use the pitch in medicines, and use an infusion of the bark, sometimes mixed with spruce and tamarack bark, for gonorrhea. They use the needles and branches as pillows and bedding, the roots as thread, and use the pitch to waterproof seams in canoes.

== Tree emblem ==
Balsam fir is the provincial tree of New Brunswick.

== See also ==
- Balsam of Peru
- Fraser fir

== Gallery ==
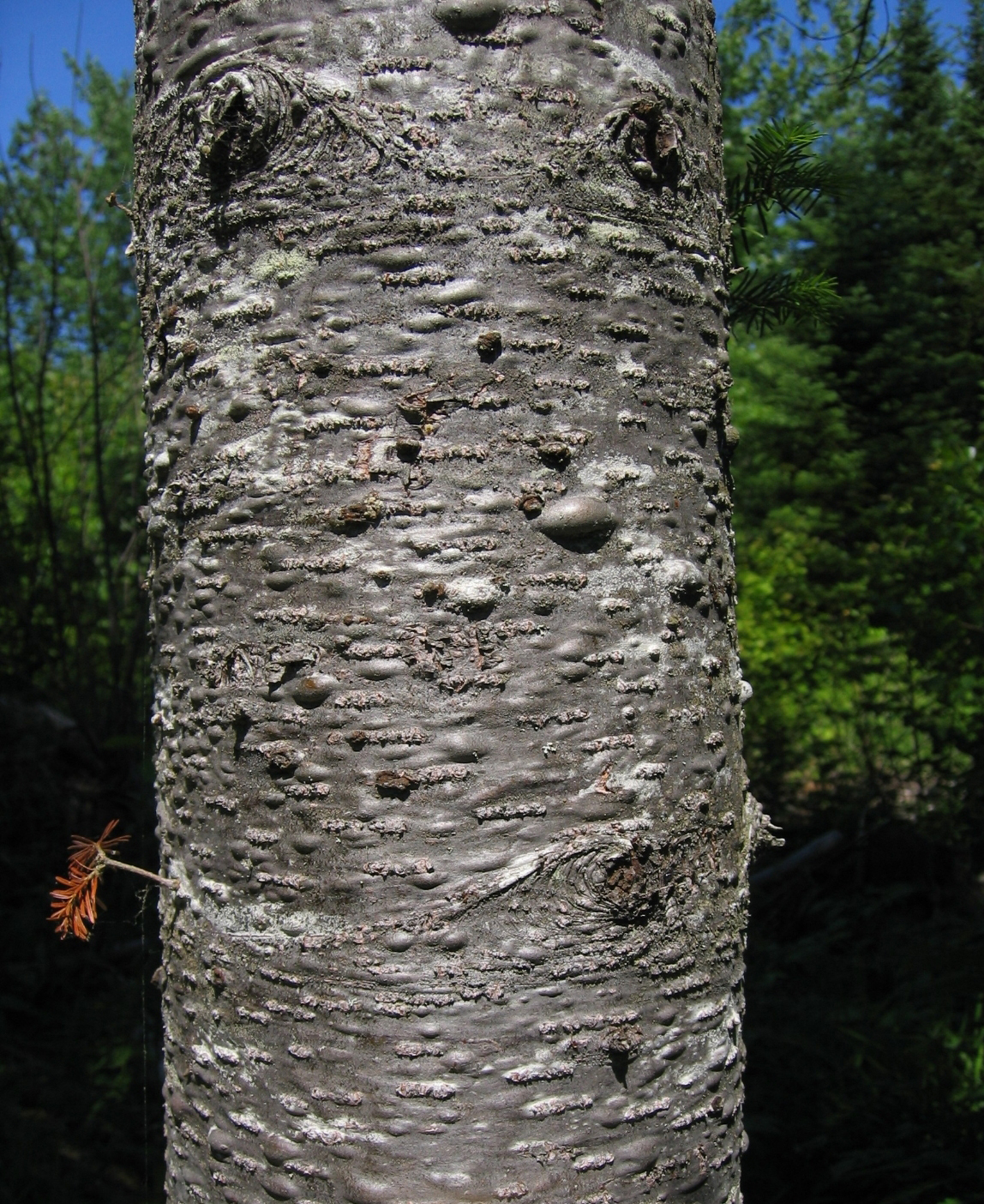
Bark

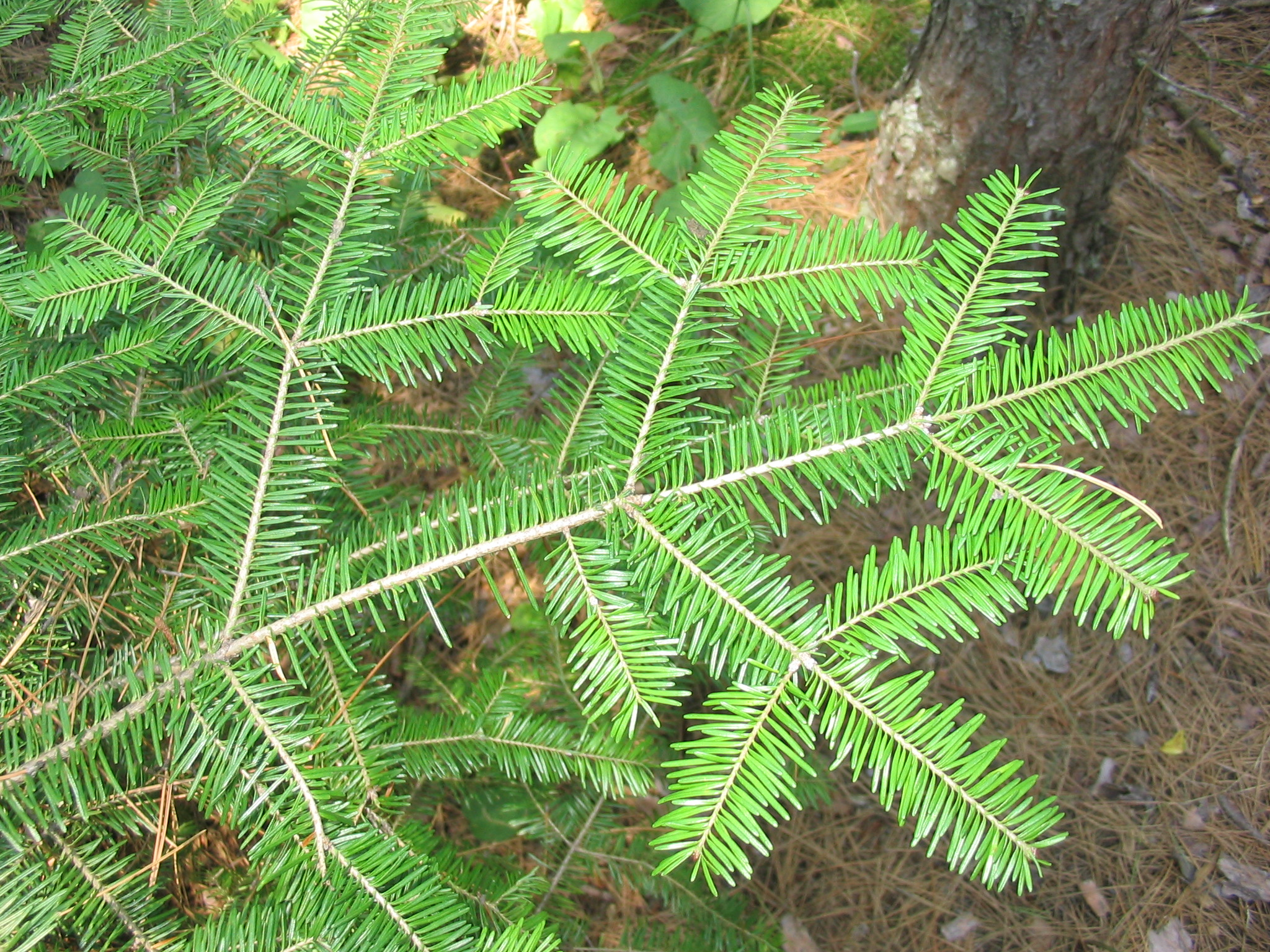
Leaves (needles) on symmetrical branchlets

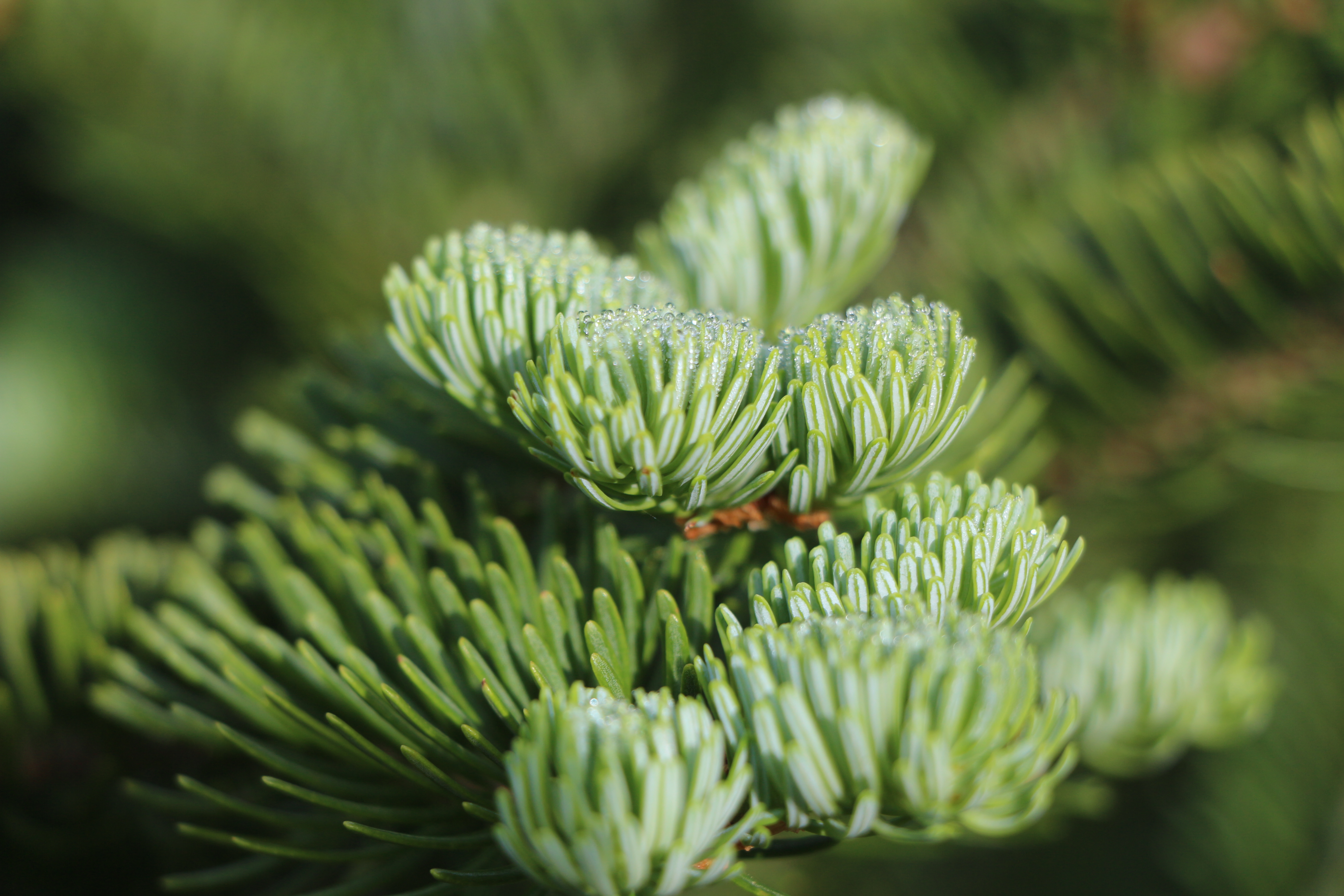
Closeup of thickly leaved branchlets

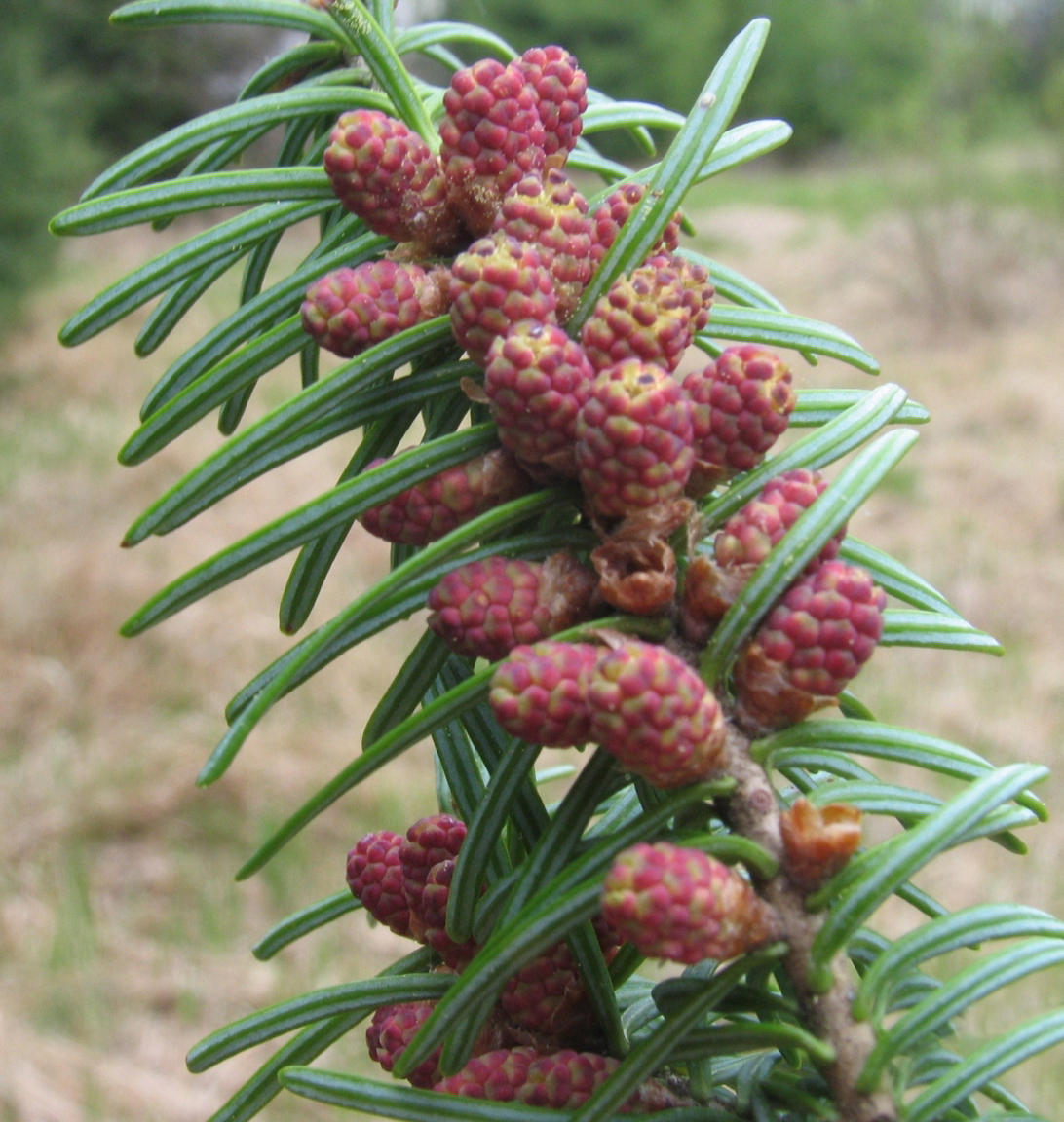
Pollen cones

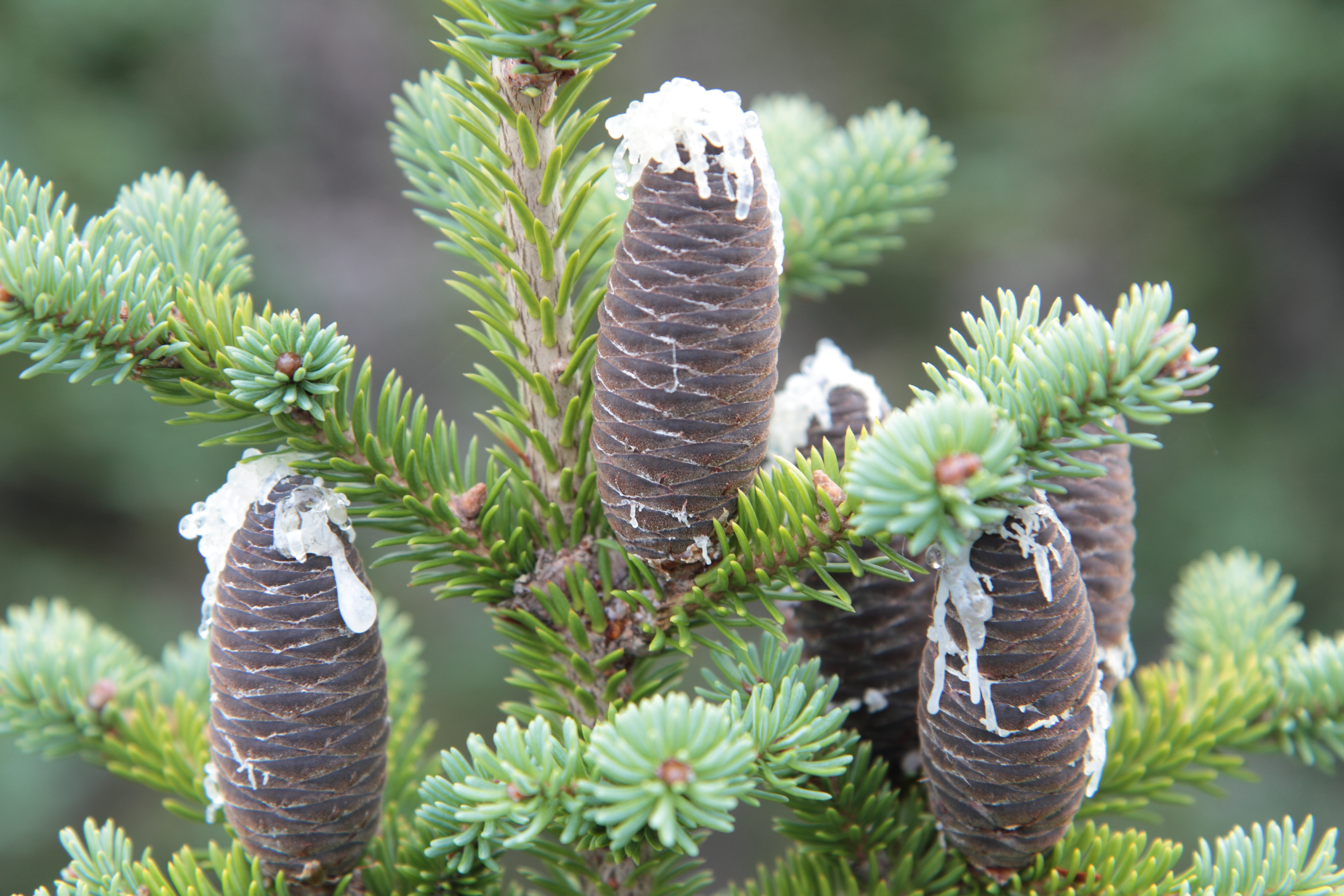
Seed cones with resin oozing out in the Mingan Archipelago, Quebec
