= Fern moss =

Fern moss may refer to several varieties of moss that produce feathery fronds and can form a moss carpet across grass or bare patches of ground:

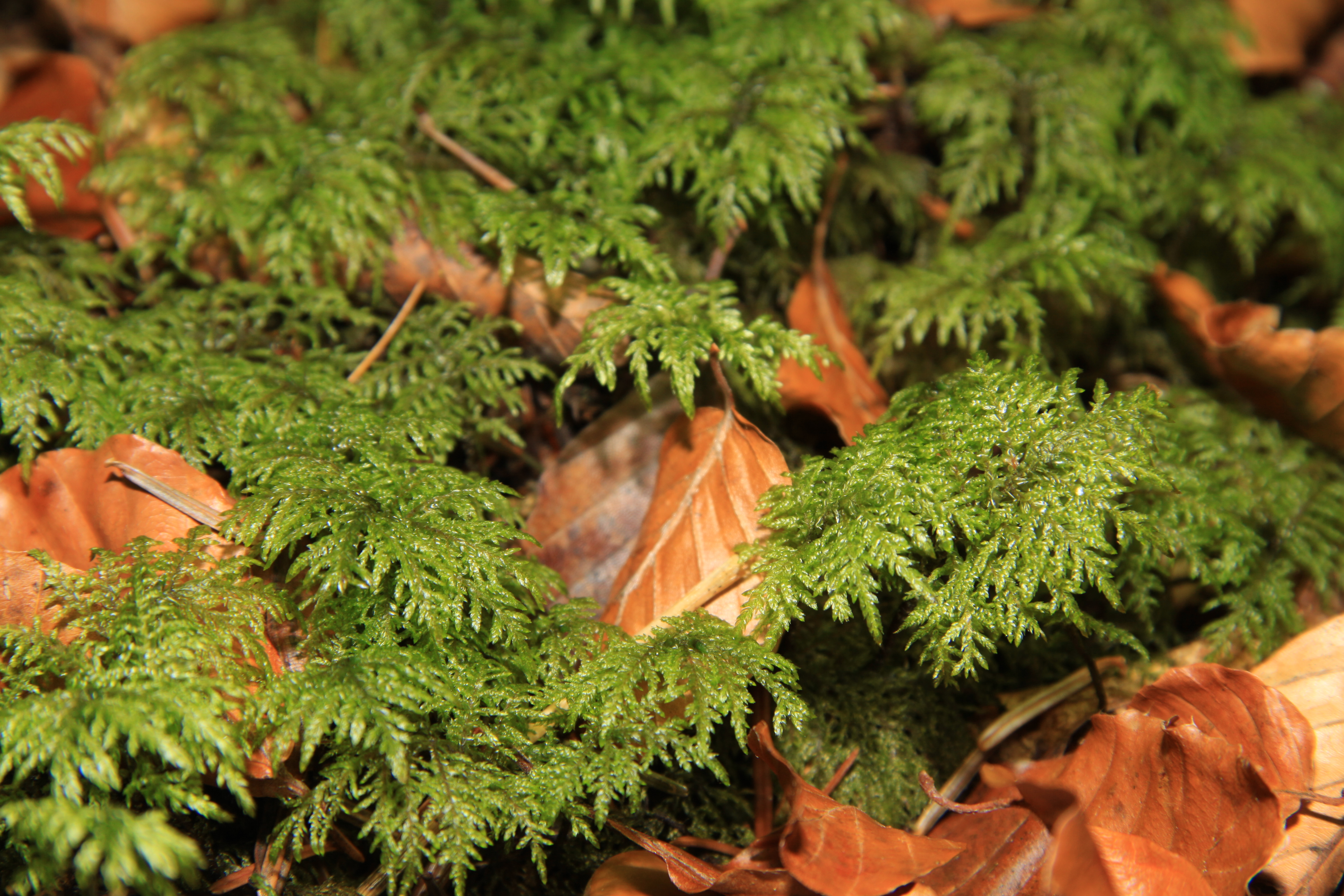
Hylocomium splendens

- Fissidens bryoides – lesser fern moss
- Hylocomium splendens or Hylocomium proliferum – mountain fern moss
- Thuidium species including:
  - Thuidium abietinum – wiry fern moss
  - Thuidium delicatulum – common fern moss
  - Thuidium recognitum – hook-leaf fern moss

Possibly also:

- Drepanocladus species including:
  - Drepanocladus fluitans
  - Drepanocladus uncinatus
