= Cow Myers (wetland) =

Site of Special Scientific Interest in North Yorkshire, England

- Site of Special Scientific Interest
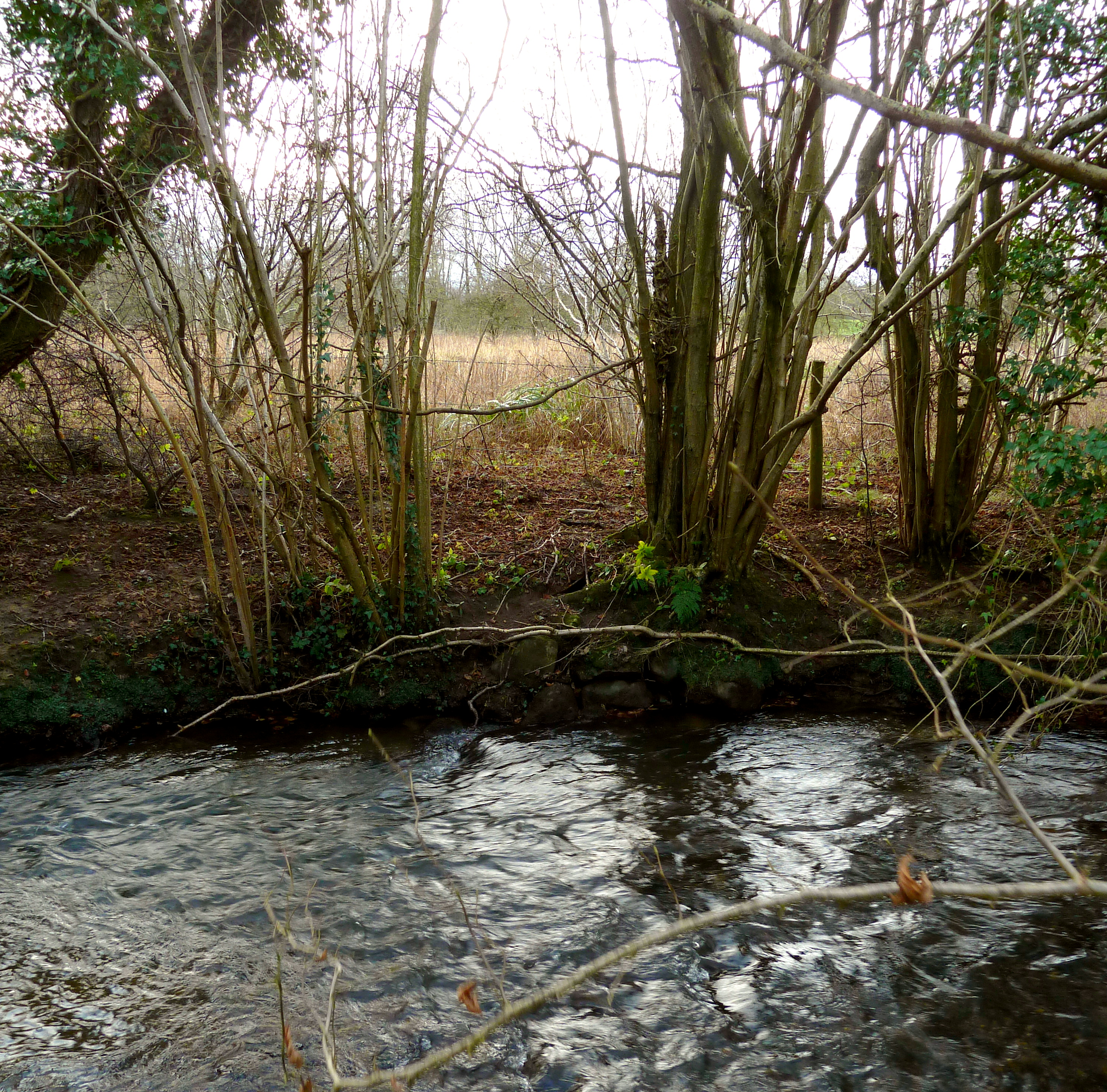
- Kex Beck, with Carr Myers fen in the background

- Location within North Yorkshire
- Location of Cow Myers.
- Area of search: North Yorkshire
- Grid reference: SE270729
- Coordinates: 54.1512°N 1.5881°W
- Interest: Biological
- Area: 15.2791 hectares (0.1528 km^{2}; 0.05899 sq mi)
- Notification date: 26 January 1984
- Location map: Magic Map (Defra)

Cow Myers is a Site of Special Scientific Interest (SSSI) located in the Nidderdale Area of Outstanding Natural Beauty (AONB), near Ripon, North Yorkshire, England. The site was designated in 1984 for its fen and alder carr habitat, which supports a diversity of wetland plant life. Of particular interest are the bird's eye primrose (Primula farinosa) which is scarce in Yorkshire, and early marsh orchid. There is no public access to this site, no vehicular access, and no public facilities.

== Site history ==
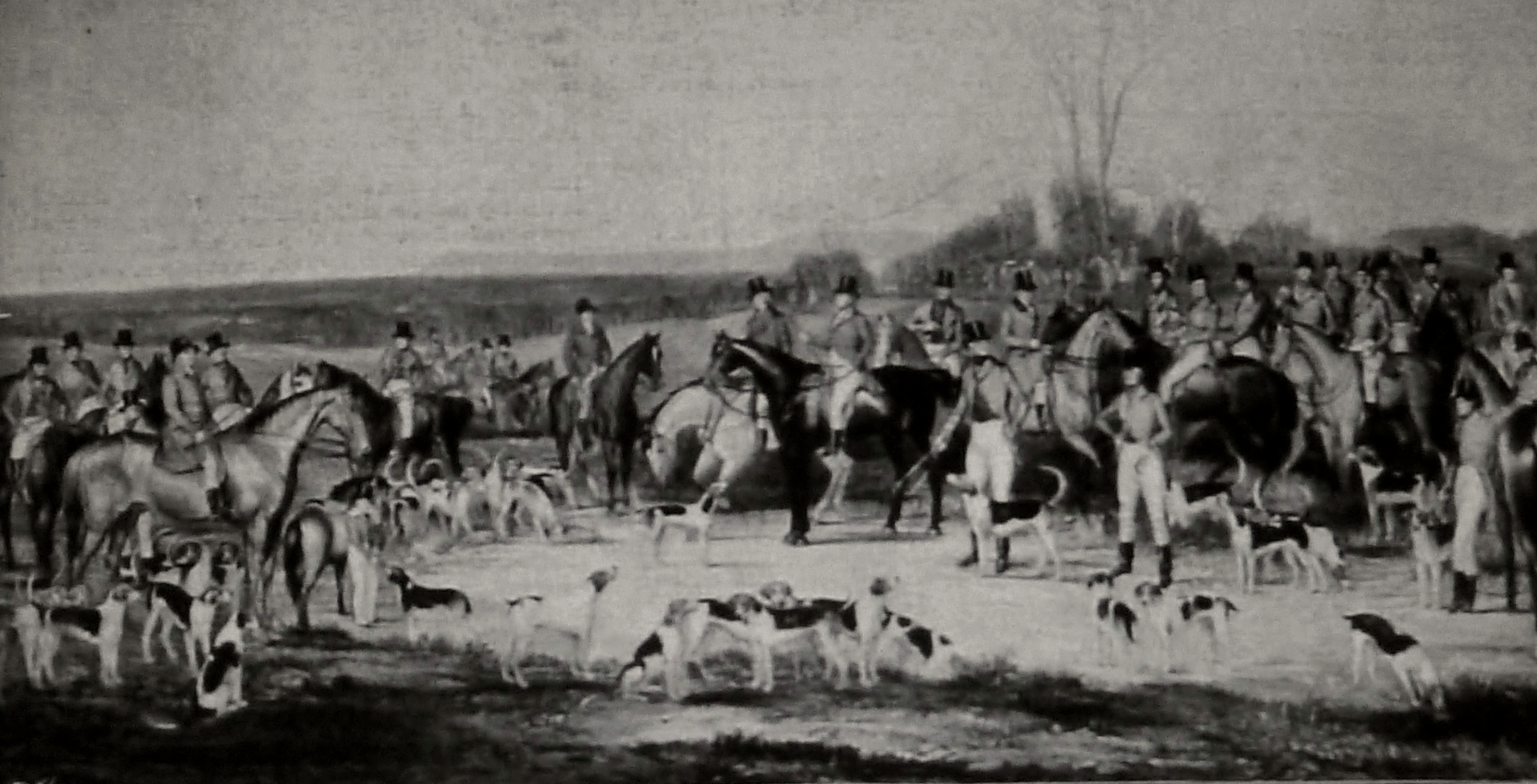
Bedale Hunt, 1842

In the 19th and early 20th centuries, Cow Myers was in foxhunting country, where the Bedale Hunt would run.

=== Witch of the Woods House ===
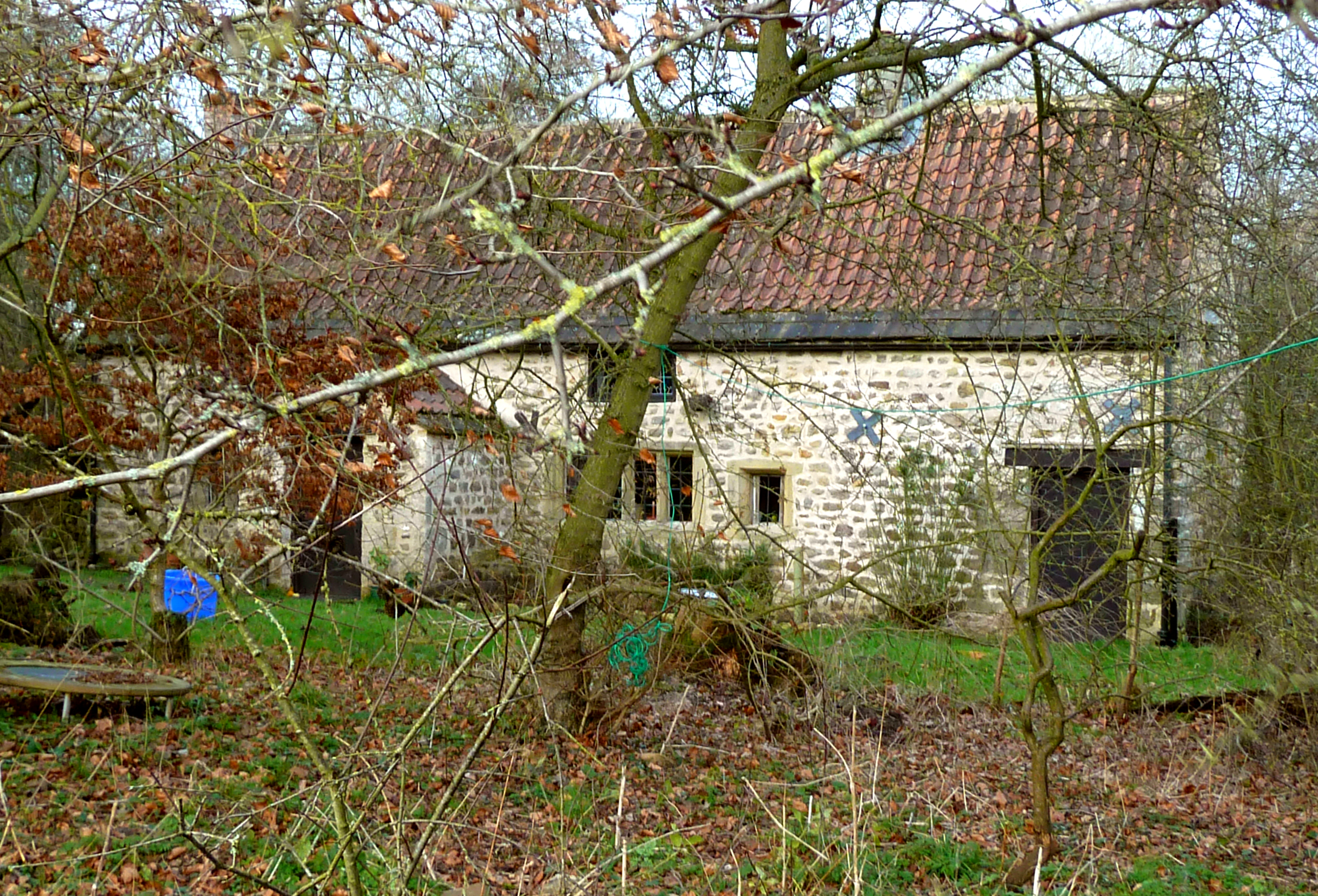
Witch of the Woods House, near Cow Myers SSSI

This 17th century listed building is not within the SSSI boundary, but may have been historically associated with its land, being the nearest surviving dwelling to the north entrance. George Wells moved into it in 1717, having inherited it from his father Henry Wells of Cowmyers farmhouse or hamlet. It is not known when or how the house acquired its name. The inside of the building is no longer divided into rooms, and the house and its grounds are not accessible to the public.

== Site location and designation ==
Cow Myers is a 15.2791 hectares (0.1528 km^{2}; 0.05899 sq mi) biological Site of Special Scientific Interest (SSSI). There is no public access to this site, no vehicle access, and no public facilities. Its level and marshy land surrounds Kex Beck, where it flows between Ellington Banks and the hamlet of Cow Myers, north west of Ripon, North Yorkshire. It is part of the Nidderdale Area of Outstanding Natural Beauty (AONB), and it is also a Site of Importance for Nature Conservation (SINC). The site is fed by springs, and is surrounded by alder carr. The marshy centre contains fen with "species-rich flushes."

Cow Myers was notified as an SSSI on 26 January 1984, for its variety of natural wetland habitats, and the diversity of plant species supported there.

== Significant site content ==
Note: Unless otherwise indicated, the flora and fauna images in this article are for identification purposes only, and the photographs were not taken at this site.

=== Flora ===
The site contains various wetland habitats, with some flora preferring particular areas. The dominant tree, in the surrounding "broadleaved, mixed and yew woodland" and carr, is black alder. The common species across the site is Phragmites australis or common reed. Where the stream runs close to the carr, there is giant fescue, globe flower and marsh hawksbeard.

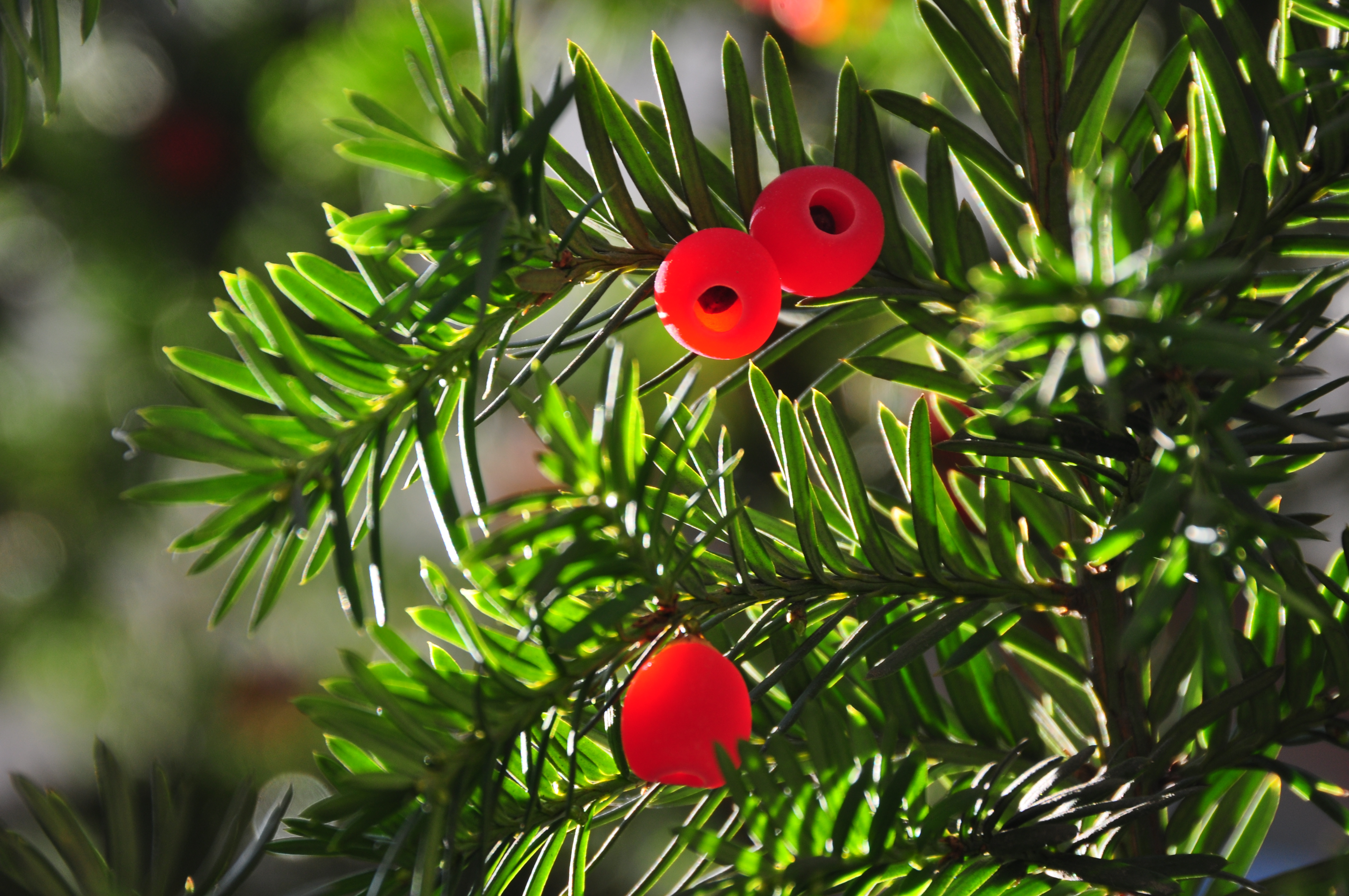
Yew

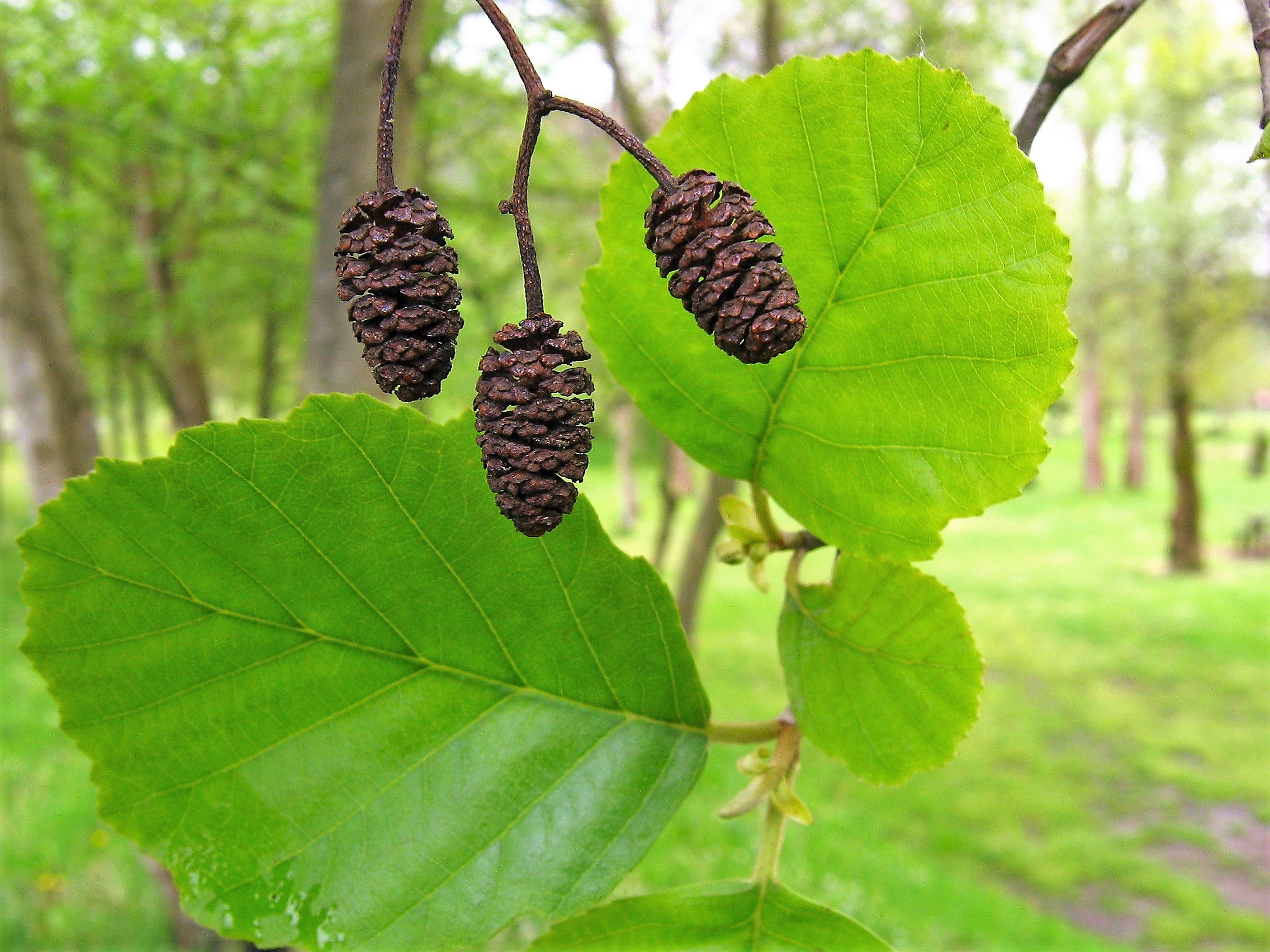
Black alder

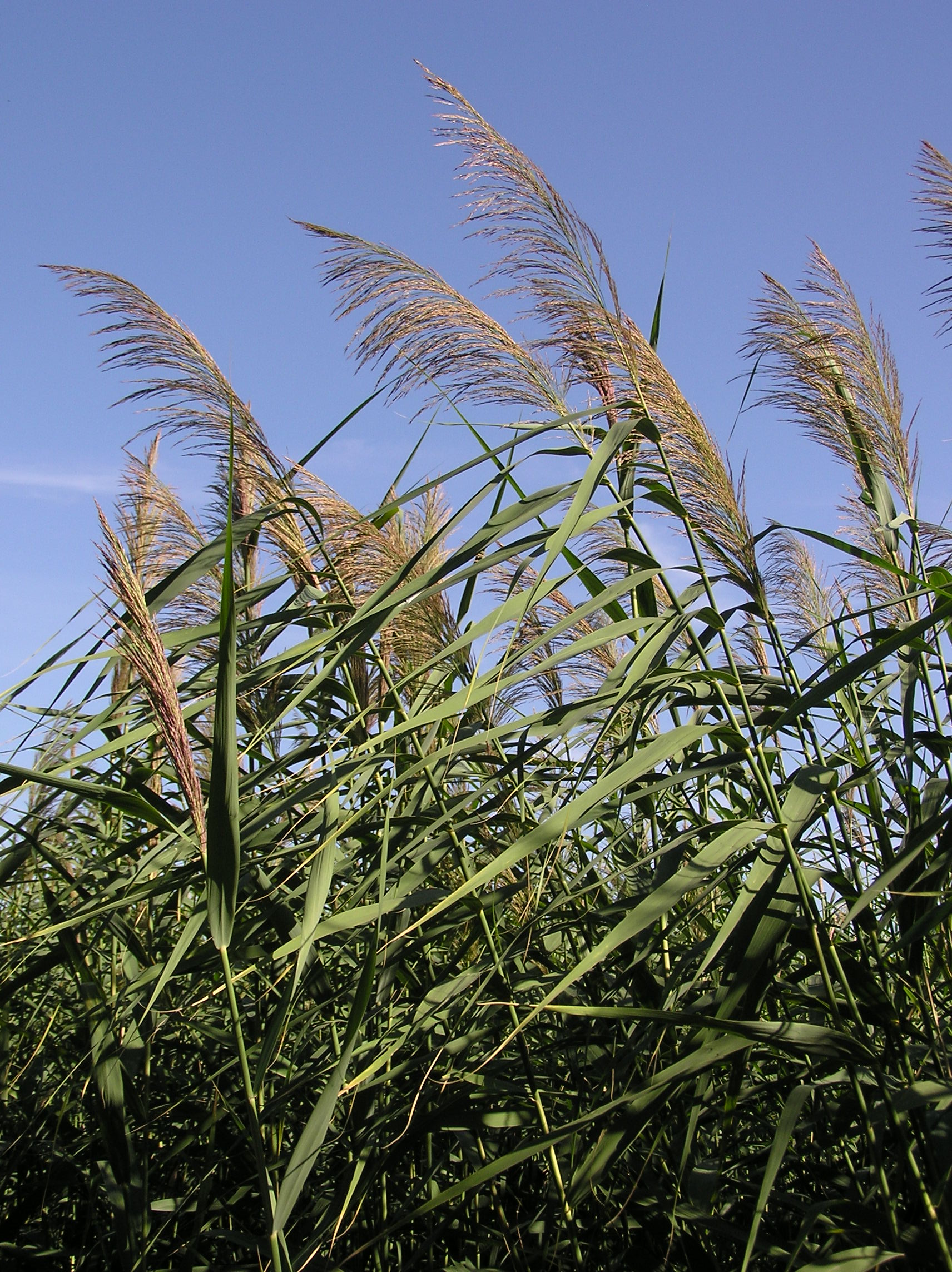
Common reed

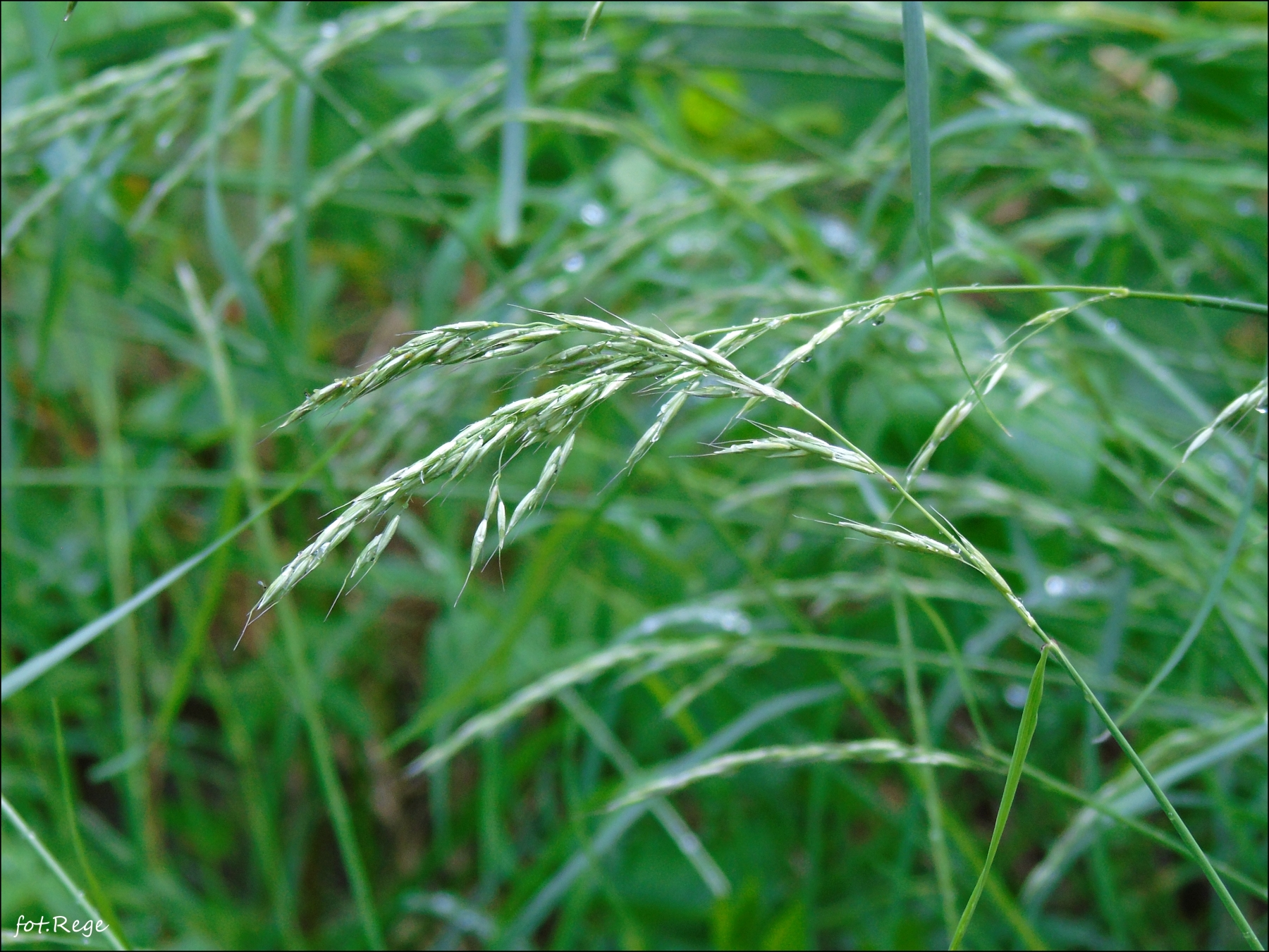
Giant fescue

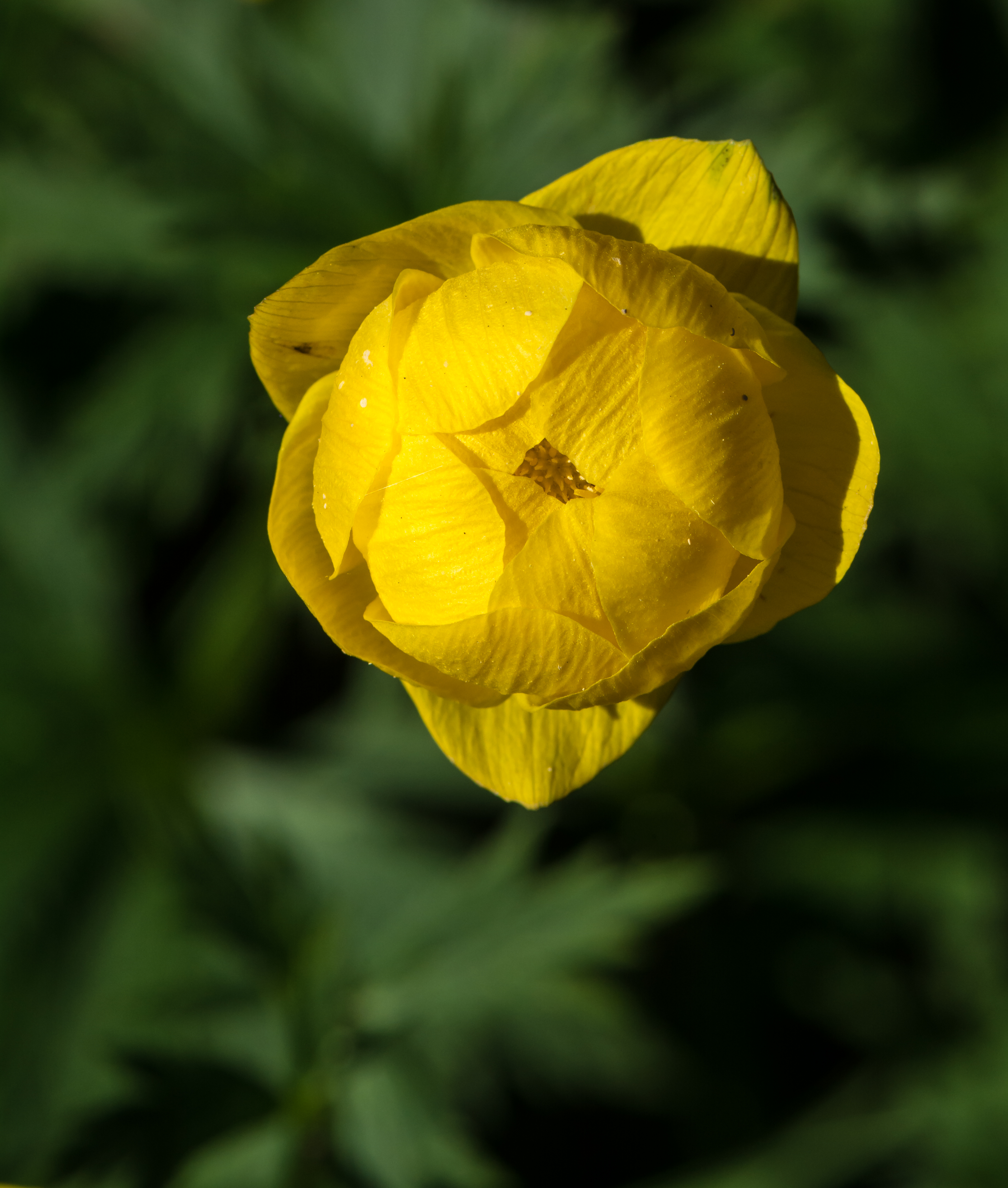
Globe flower

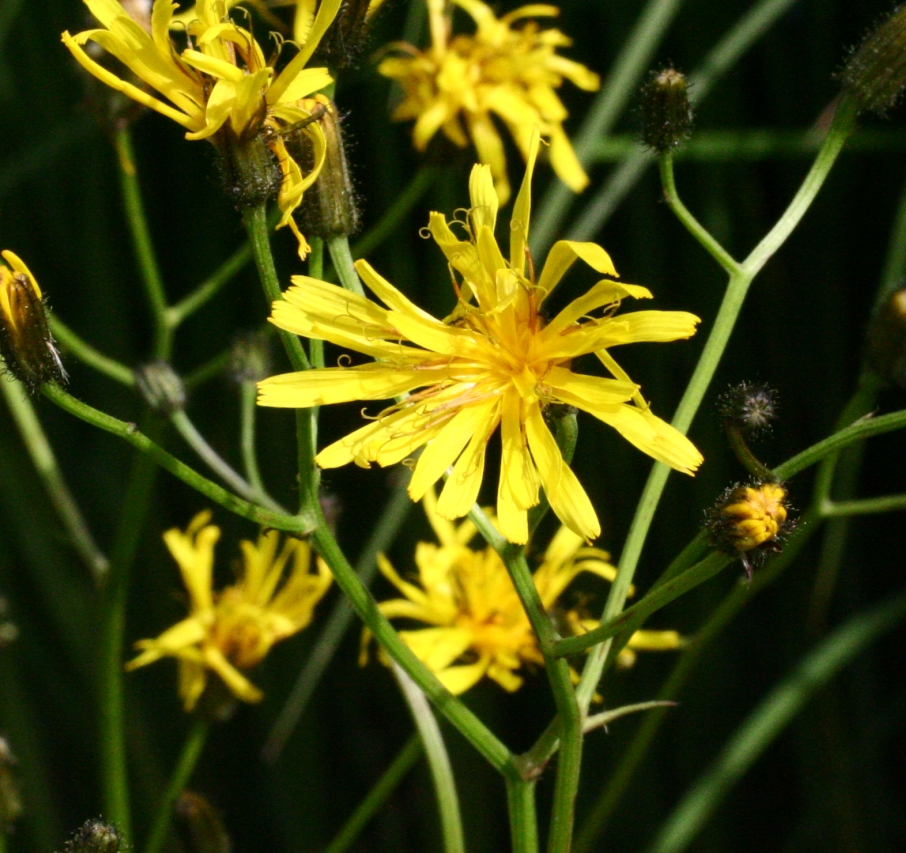
Marsh hawksbeard

There is a clearing inside the encircling carr, and the fen here is populated by blunt-flowered rush. In the flushes within the fen there is a lot of marsh arrow grass and Carex lepidocarpa or long-stalked yellow sedge. Among these grow bird's eye primrose, early marsh orchid and butterwort. The bird's eye primrose is scarce in England, growing mostly in the north-west of the country. It is rarer in Yorkshire.

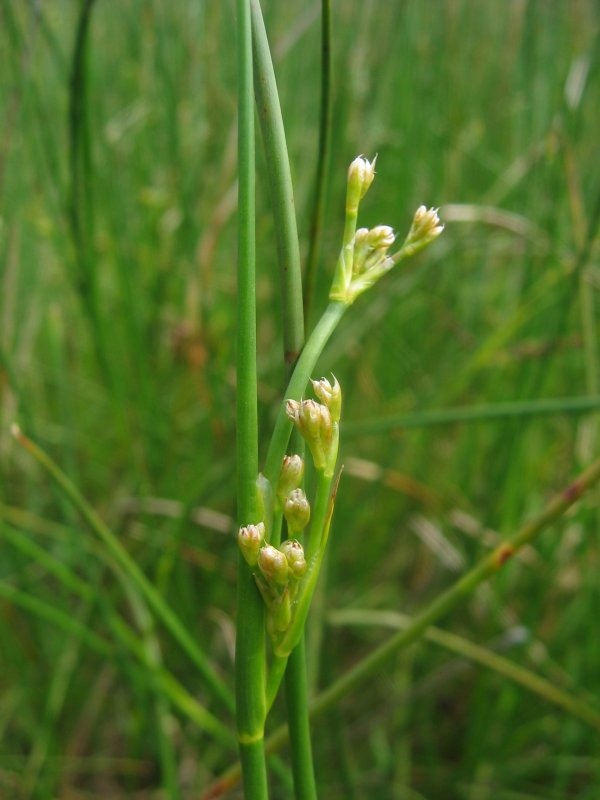
Blunt-flowered rush

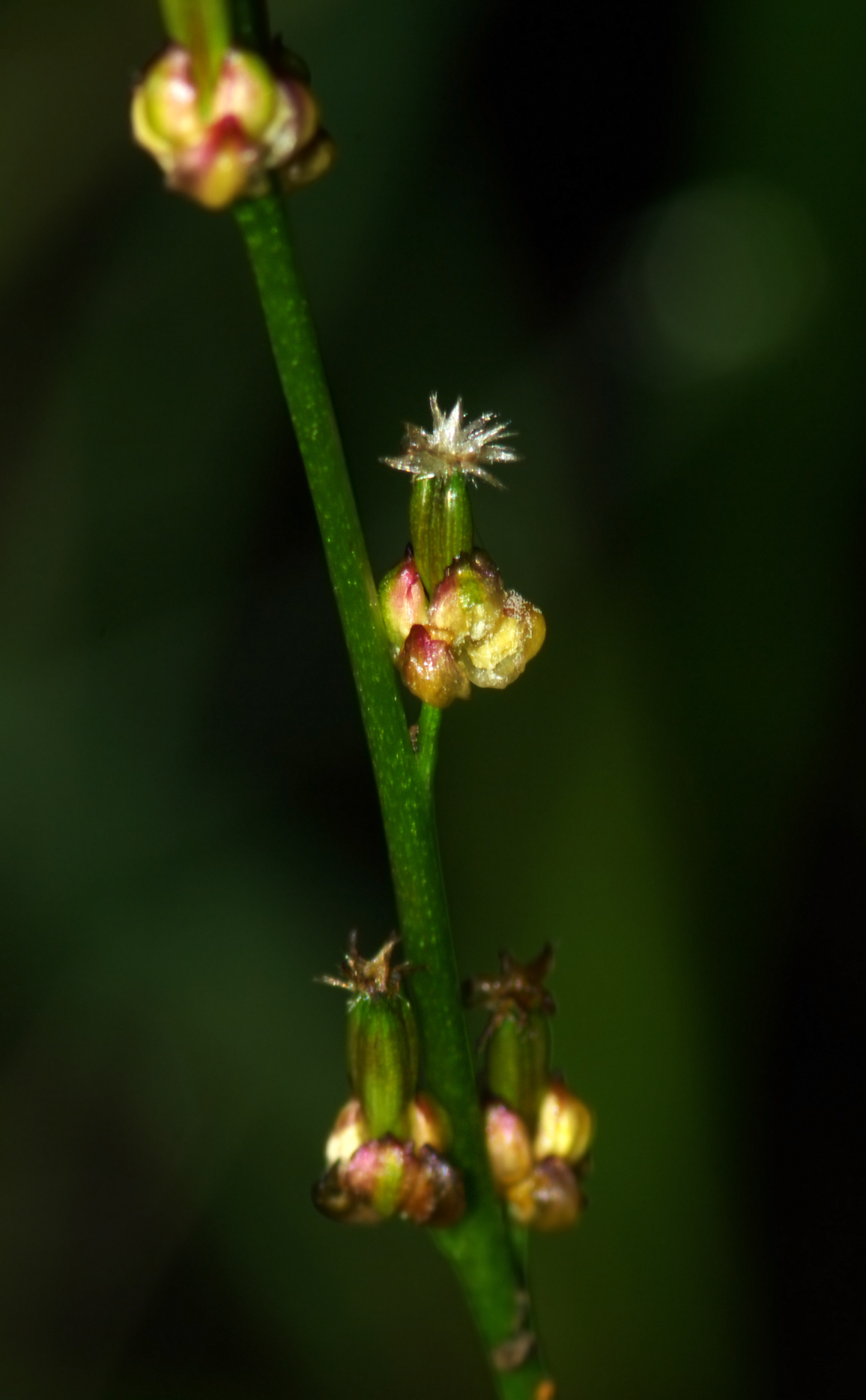
Marsh arrow grass

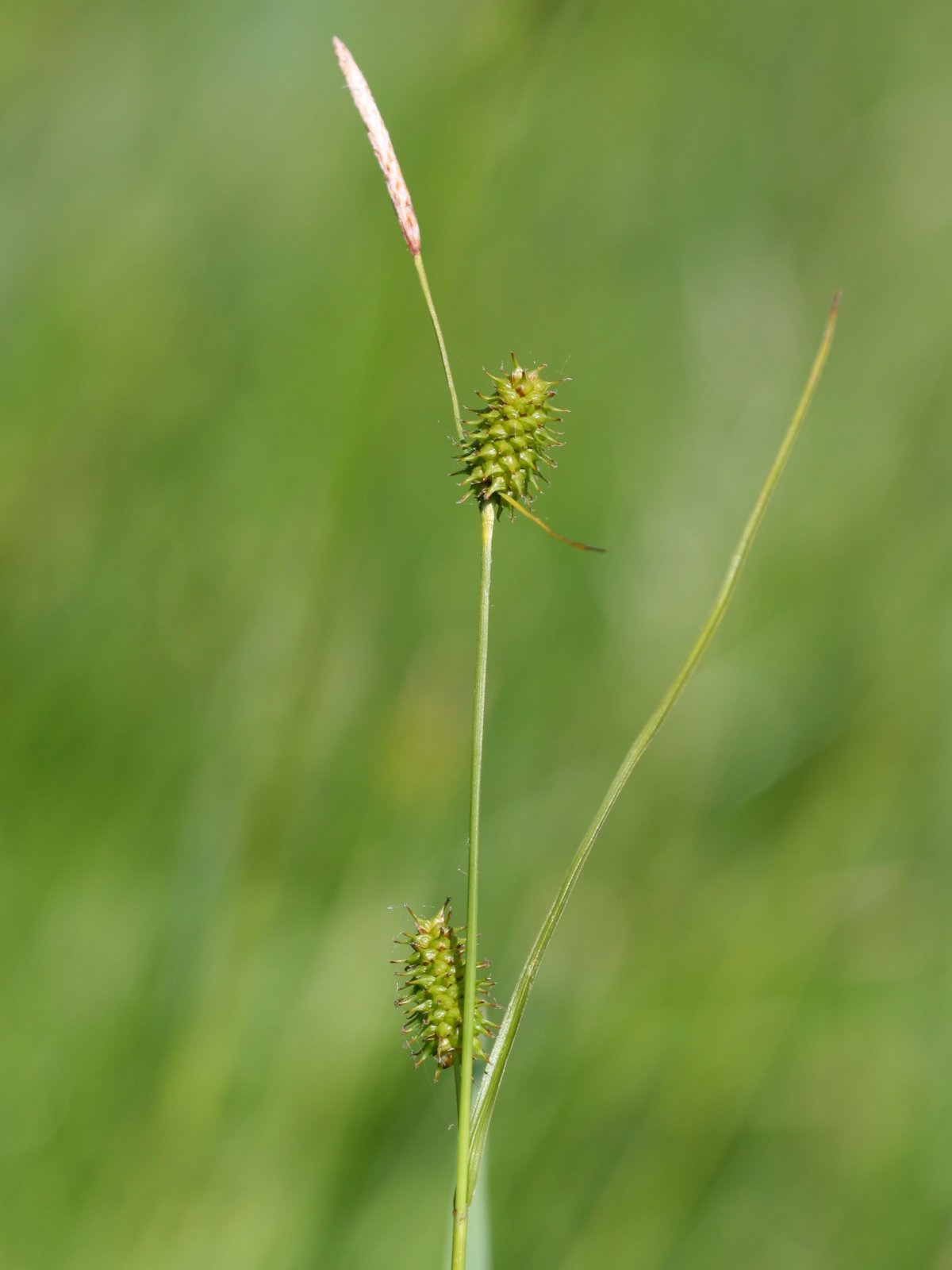
long-stalked yellow sedge

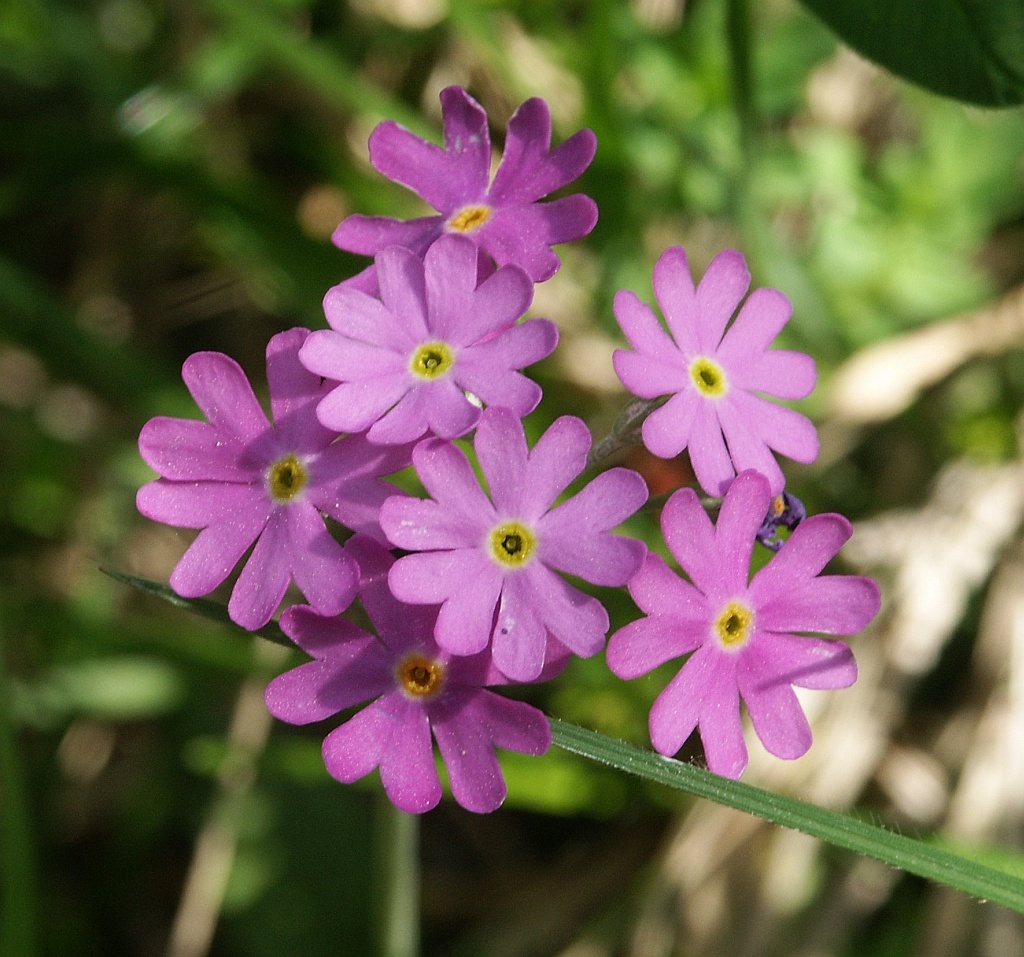
bird's eye primrose

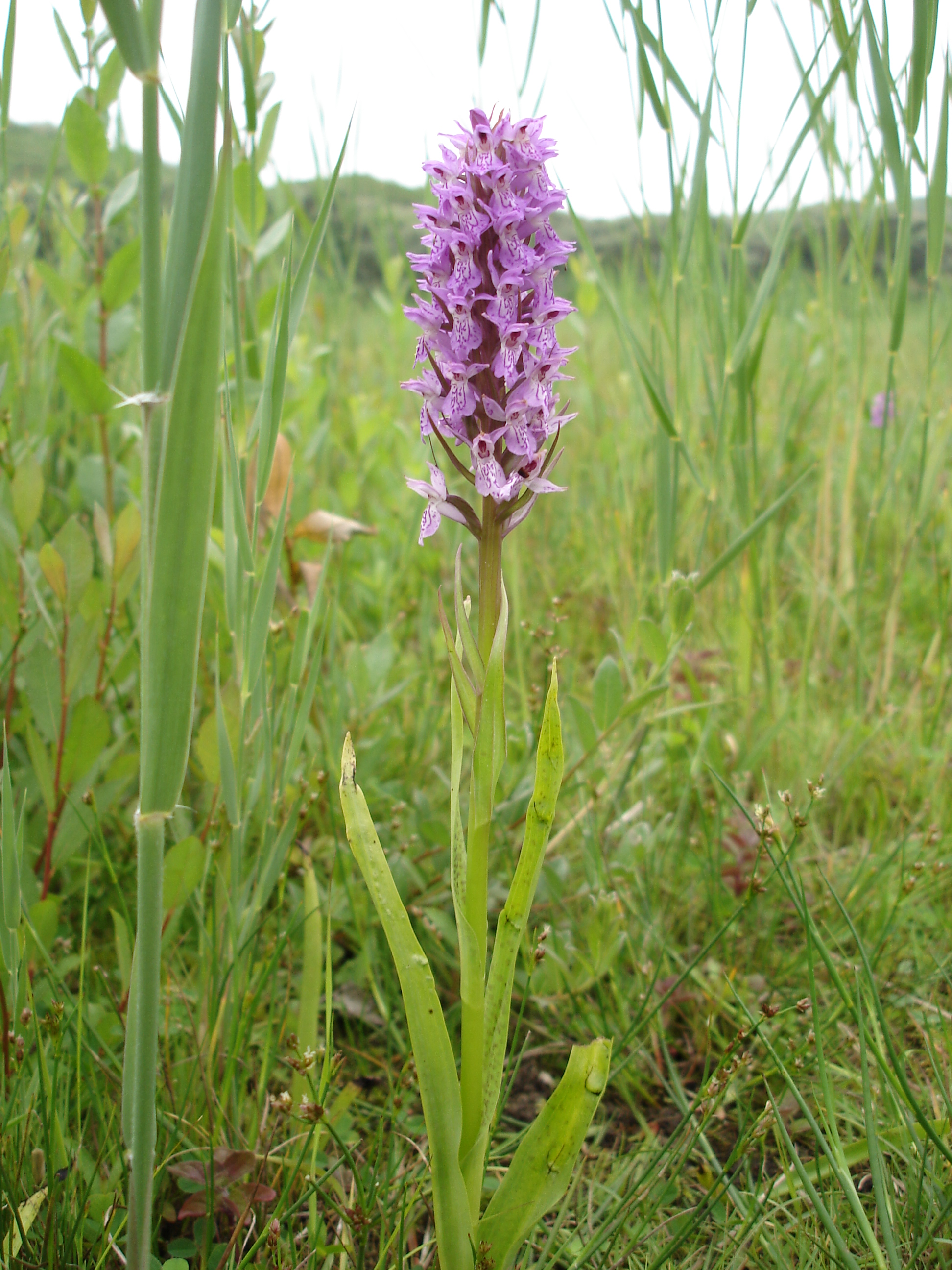
Early marsh orchid

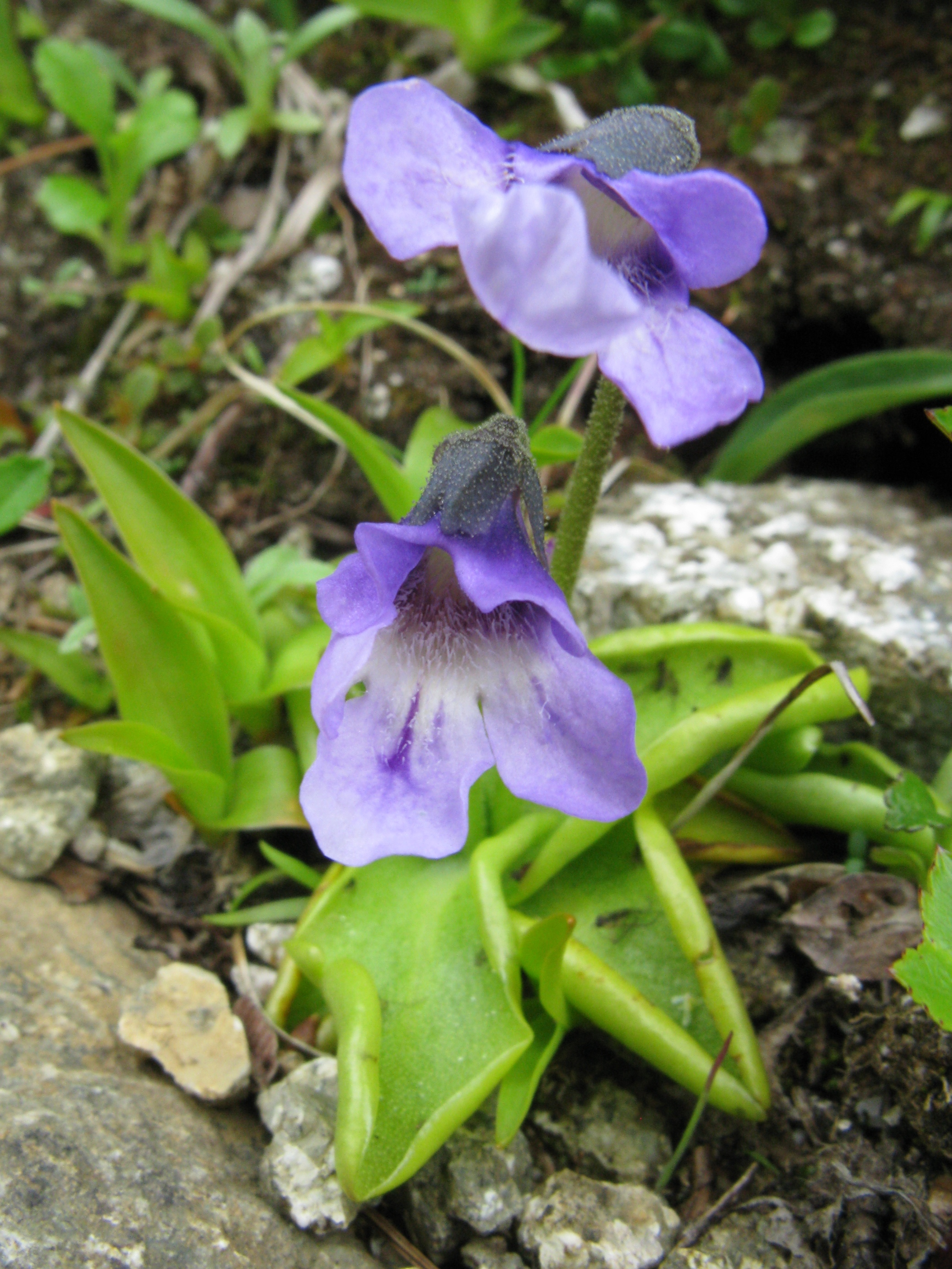
Butterwort

The more waterlogged patches contain greater reedmace alongside purple moorgrass. The site contains one patch of cross-leaved heath which can be seen among bog moss hummocks.

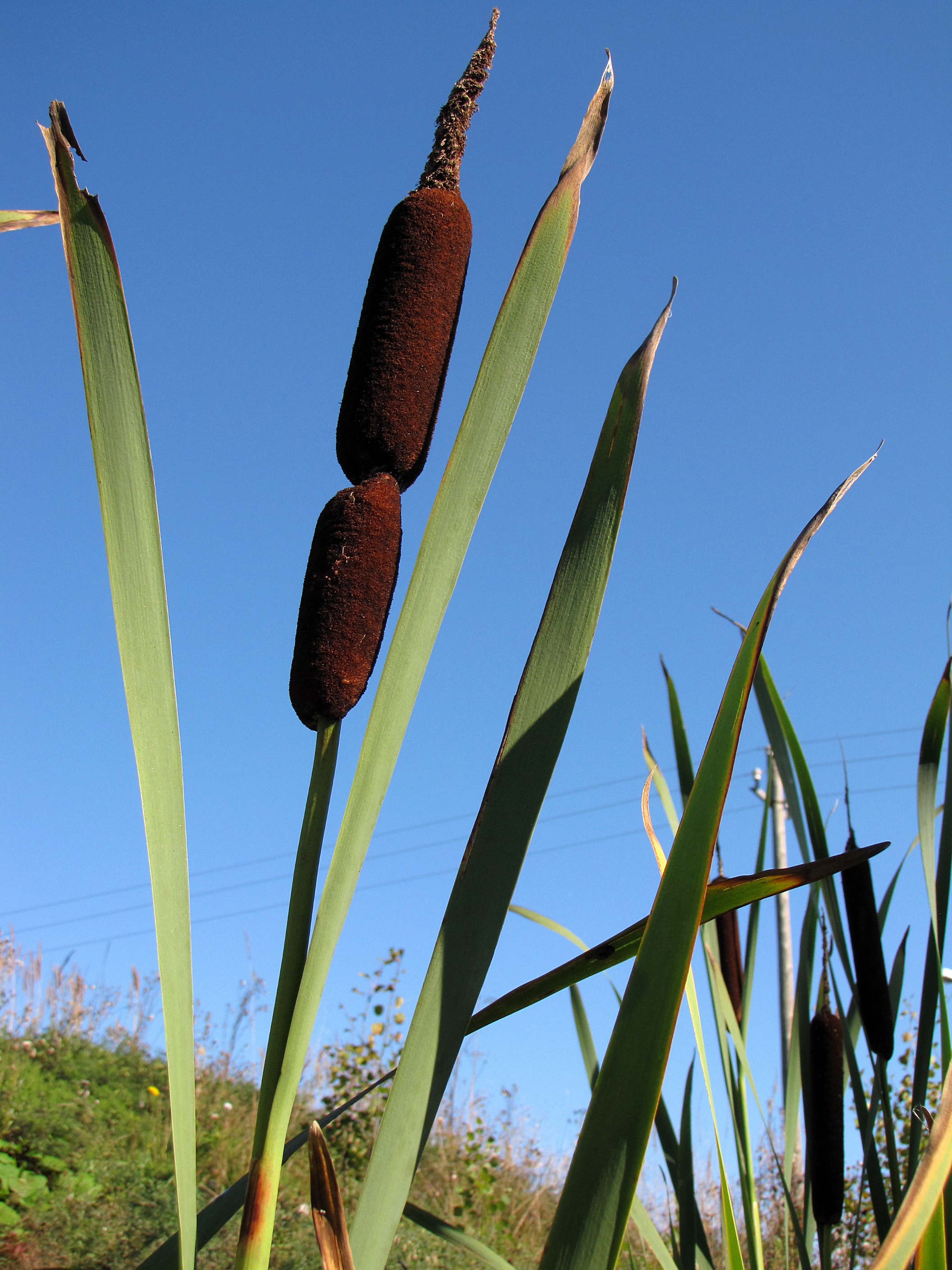
Greater reedmace

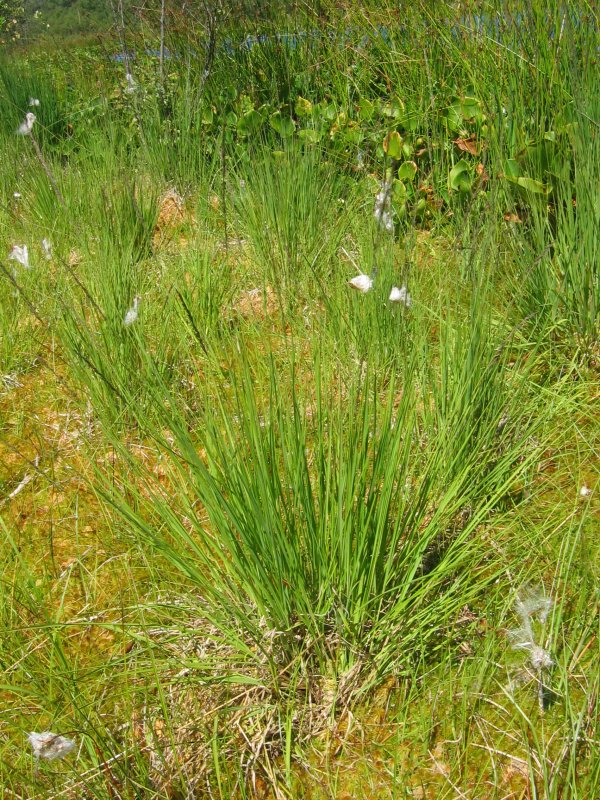
Purple moorgrass

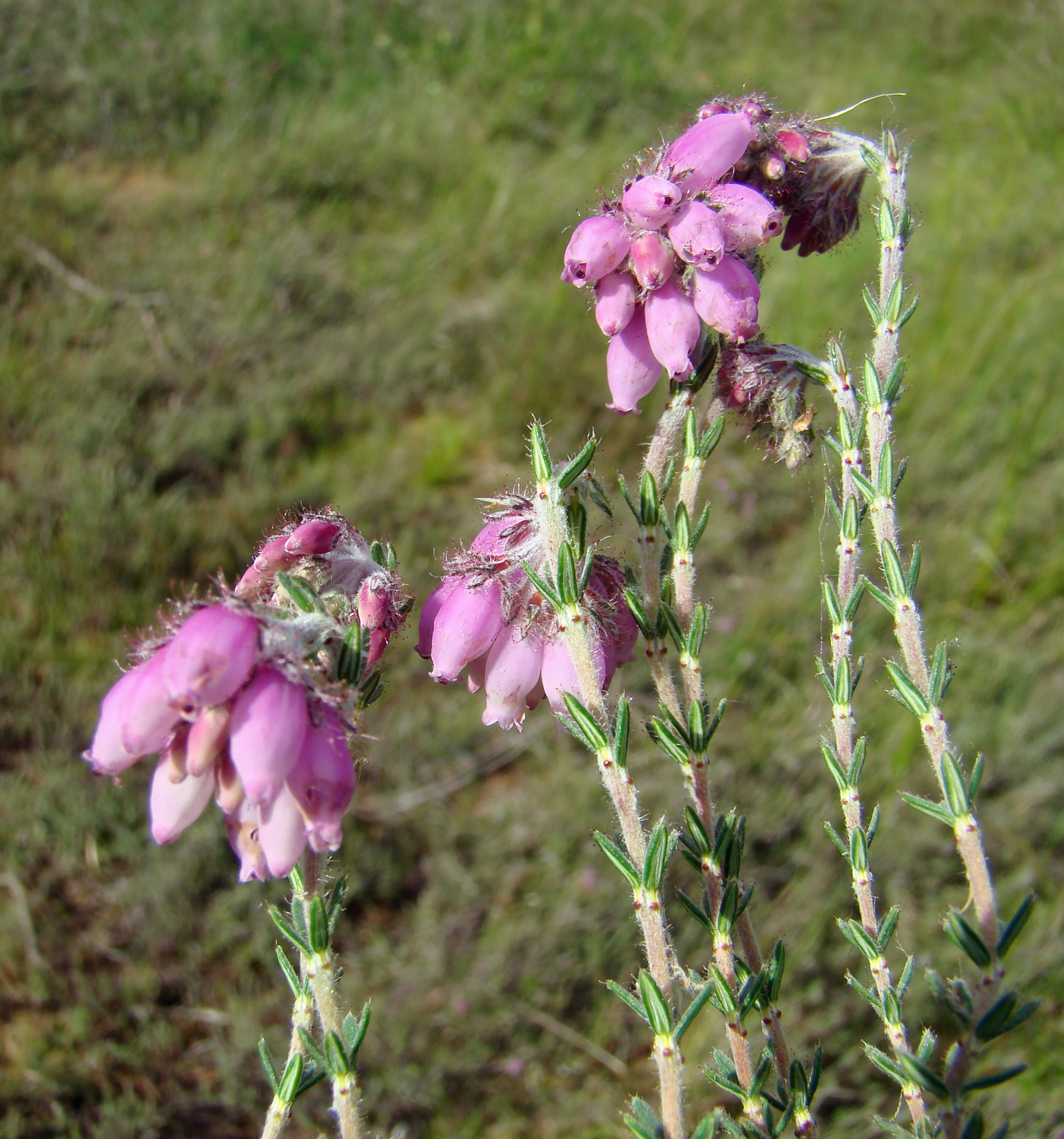
Cross-leaved heath

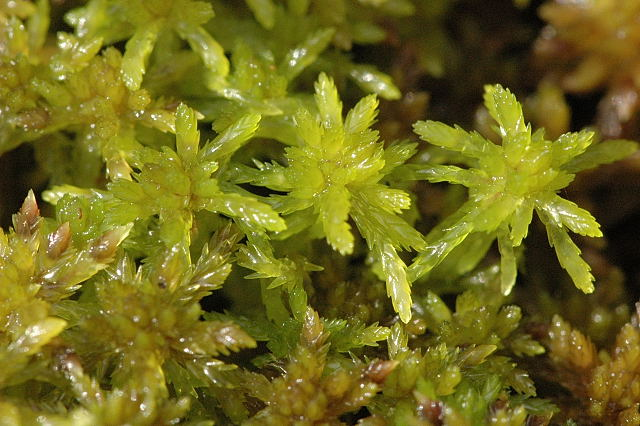
Bog moss

Over 100 plant species, including the abovementioned, were seen by the Harrogate and District Naturalists' Society in May 2019, including bog pimpernel, enchanter's nightshade, twayblade, ragged robin, yellow pimpernel, Pedicularis palustris or marsh lousewort, Valeriana dioica or marsh valerian, and early dog violet. On that day the Society also reported 35 bryophyte species.

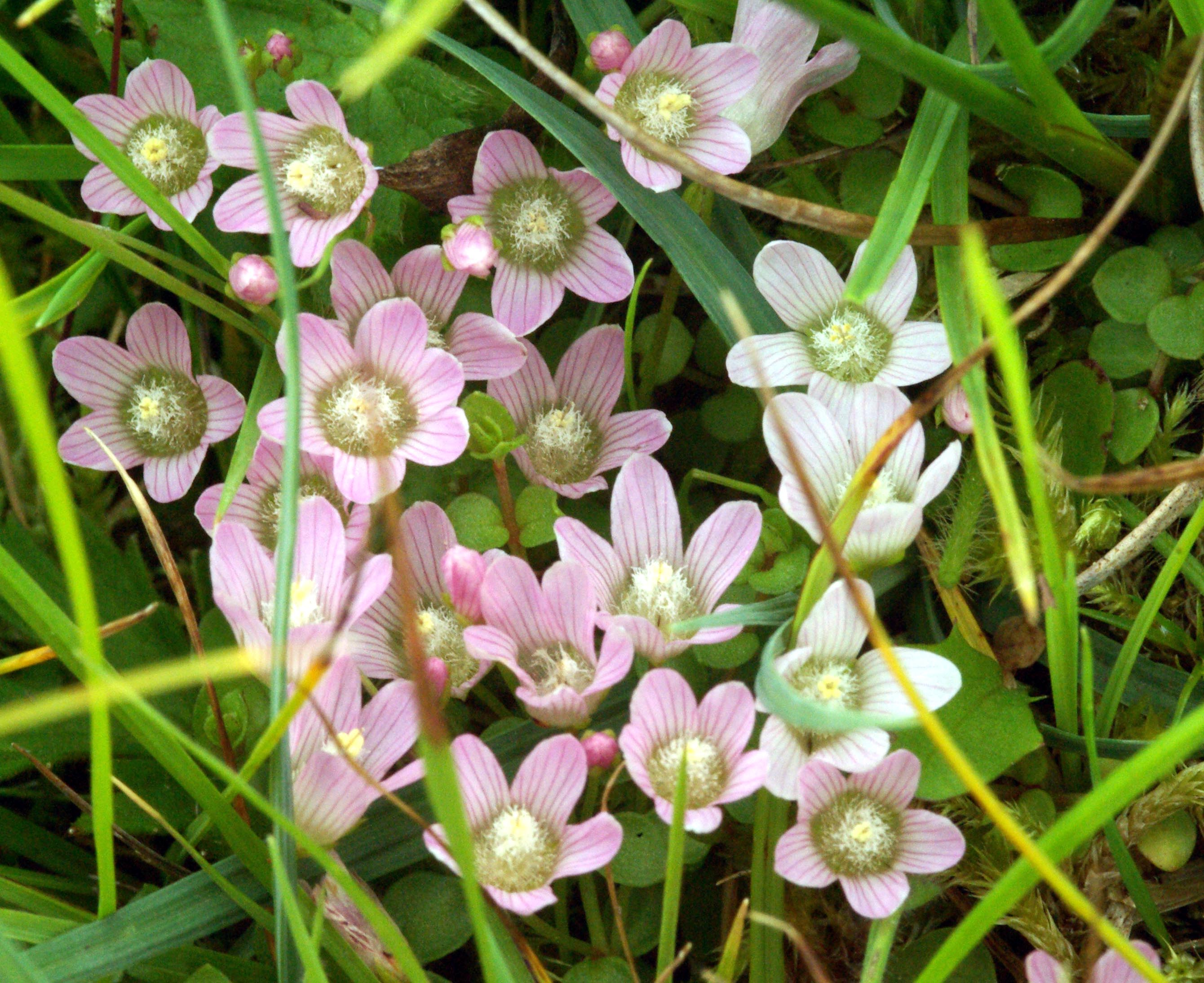
bog pimpernel

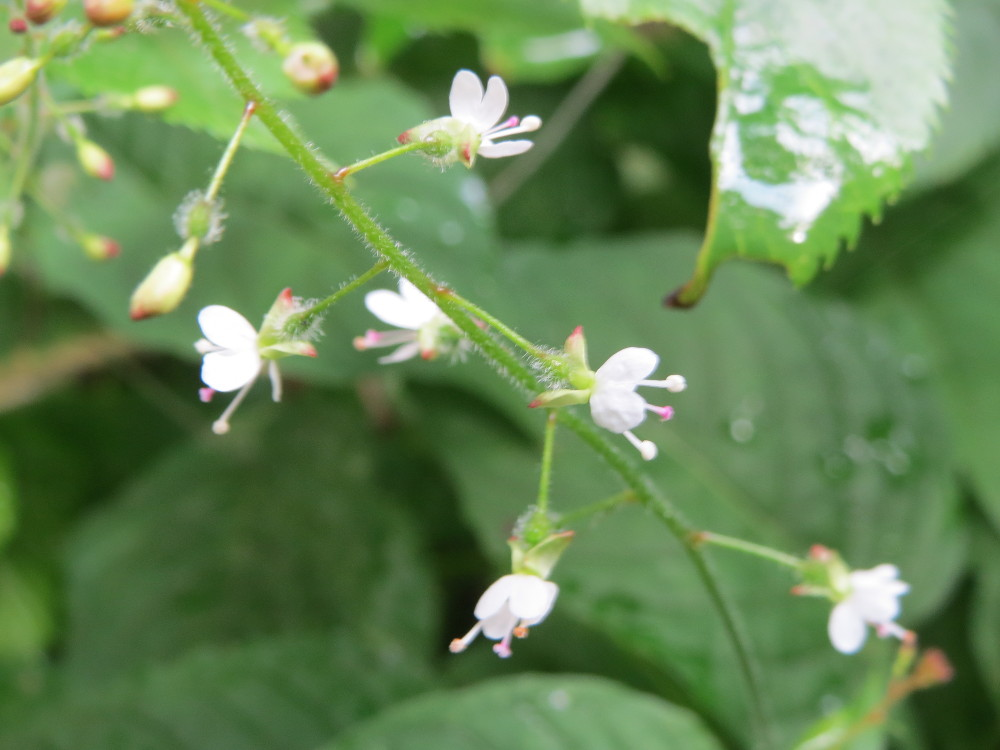
enchanter's nightshade

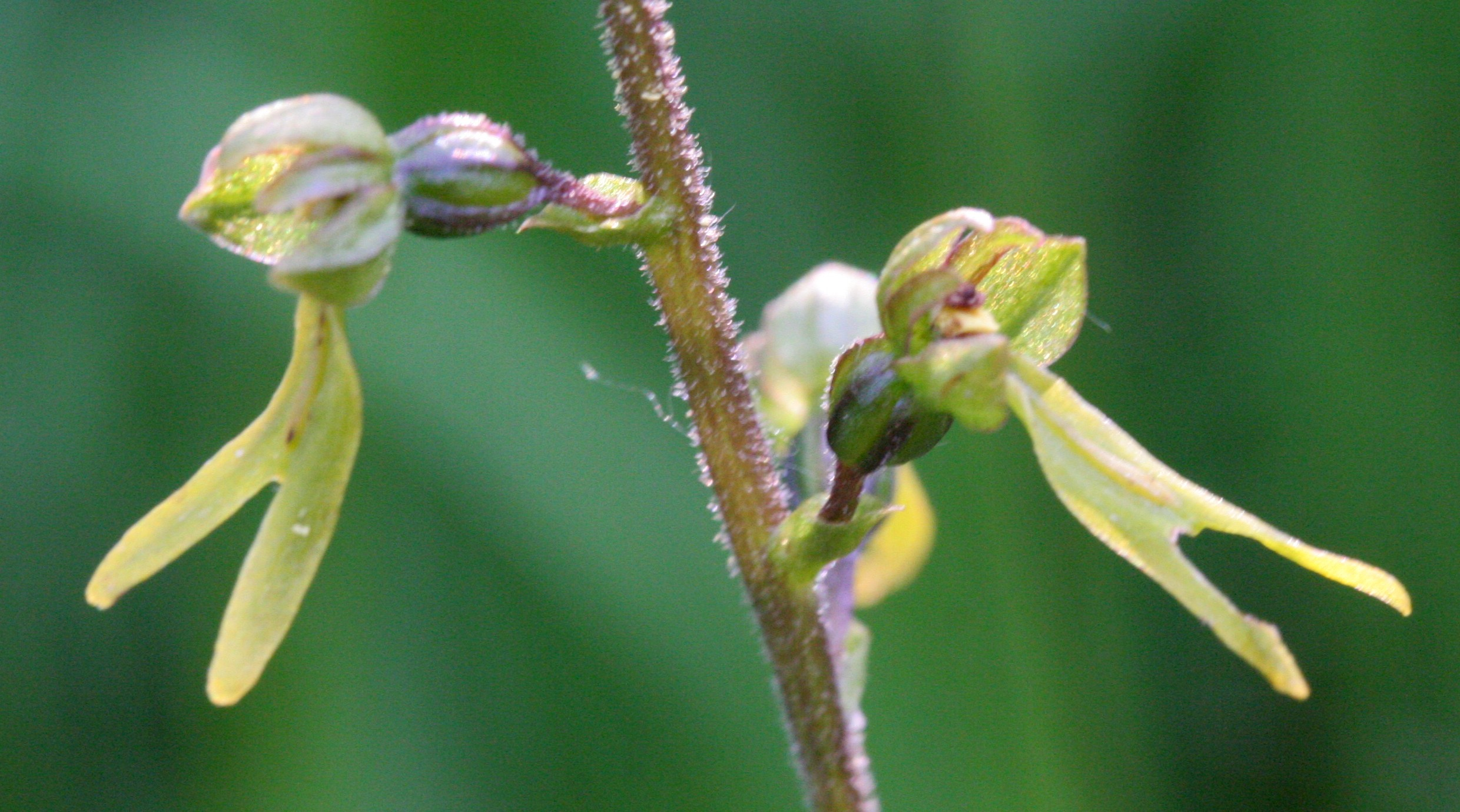
twayblade

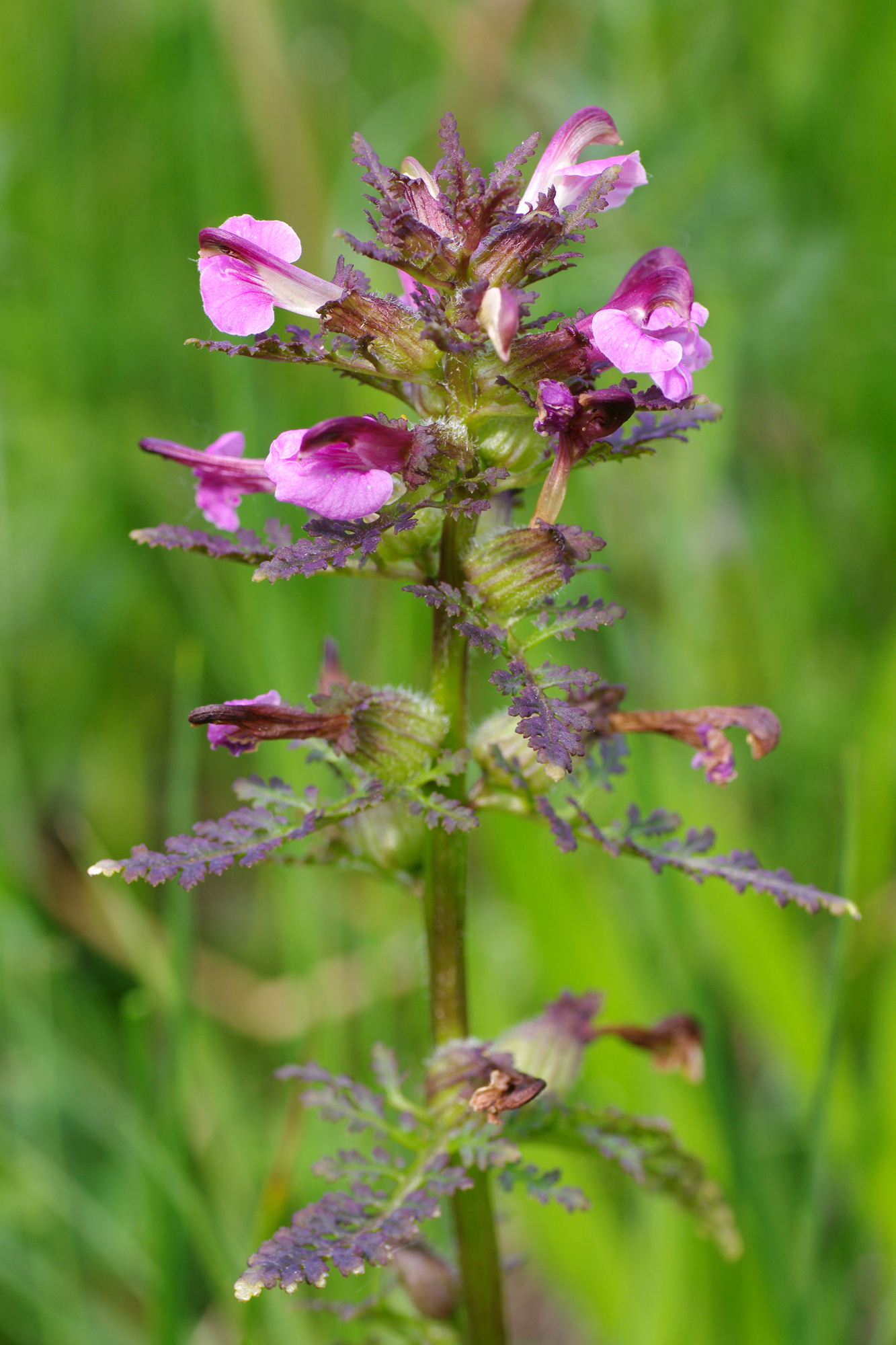
Pedicularis palustris or marsh lousewort

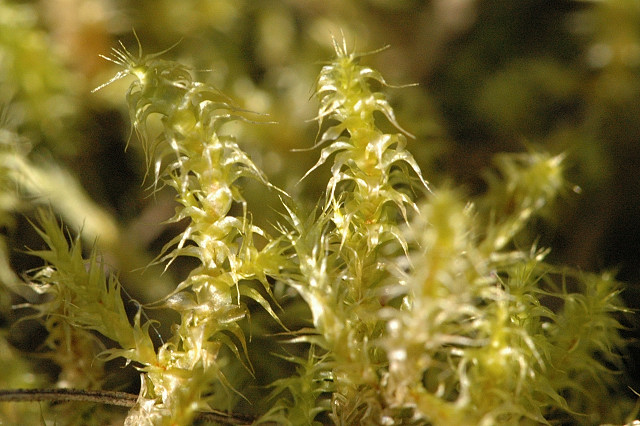
Bryophyte Rhytidiadelphus squarrosus

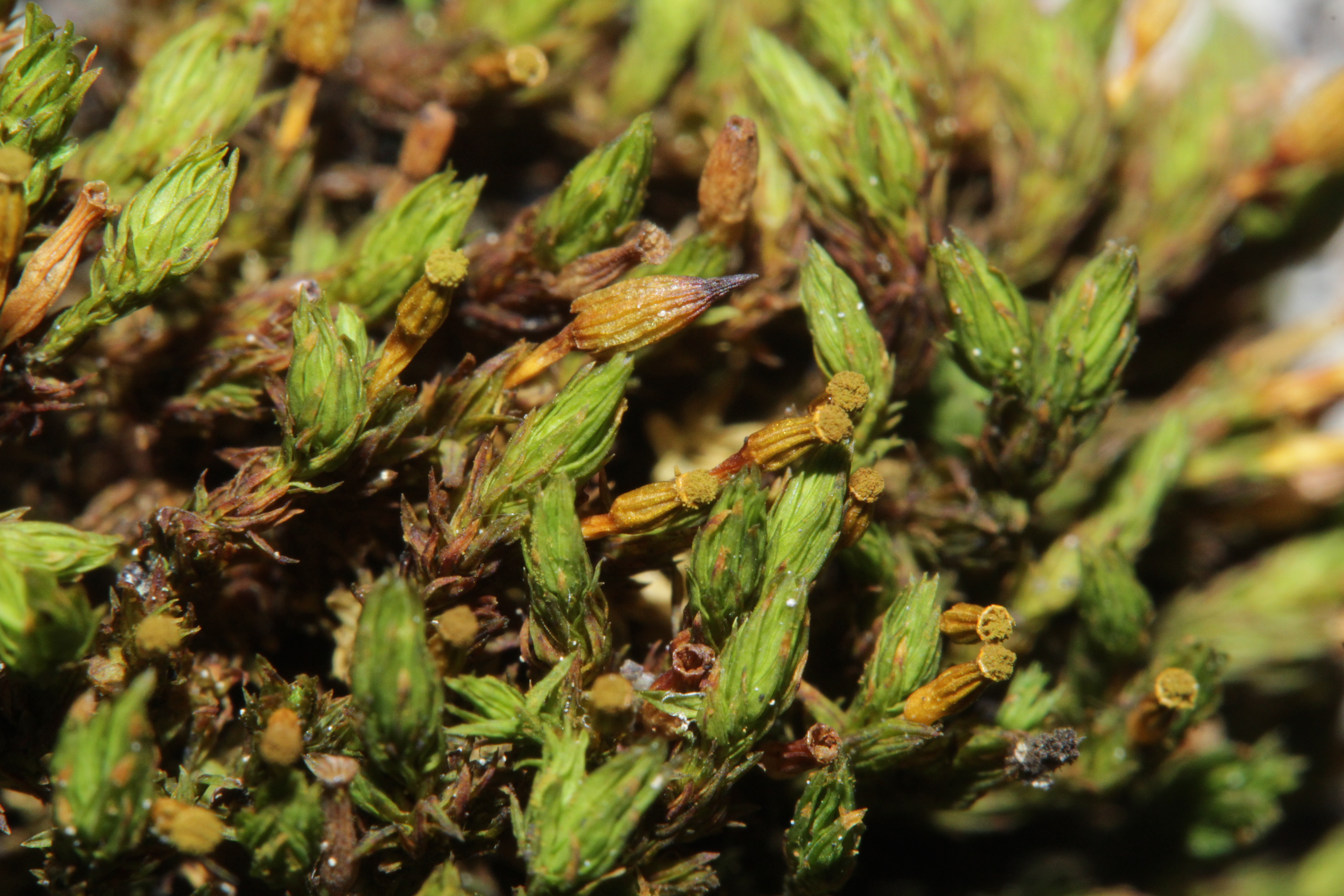
Bryophyte Orthotrichum stramineum

=== Fauna ===
The Roe deer, red fox and brown hare are present at Cow Myers.

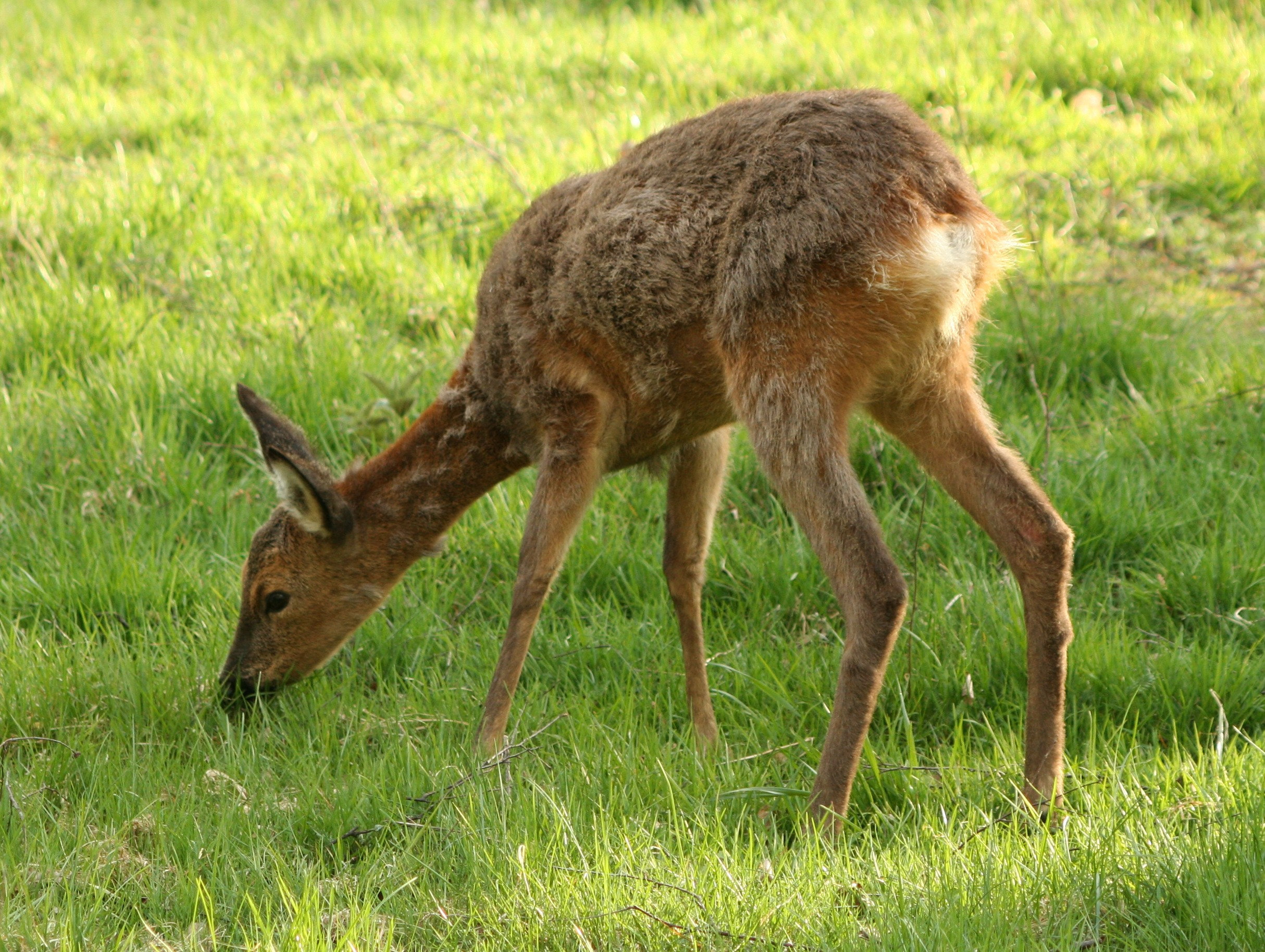
Roe deer

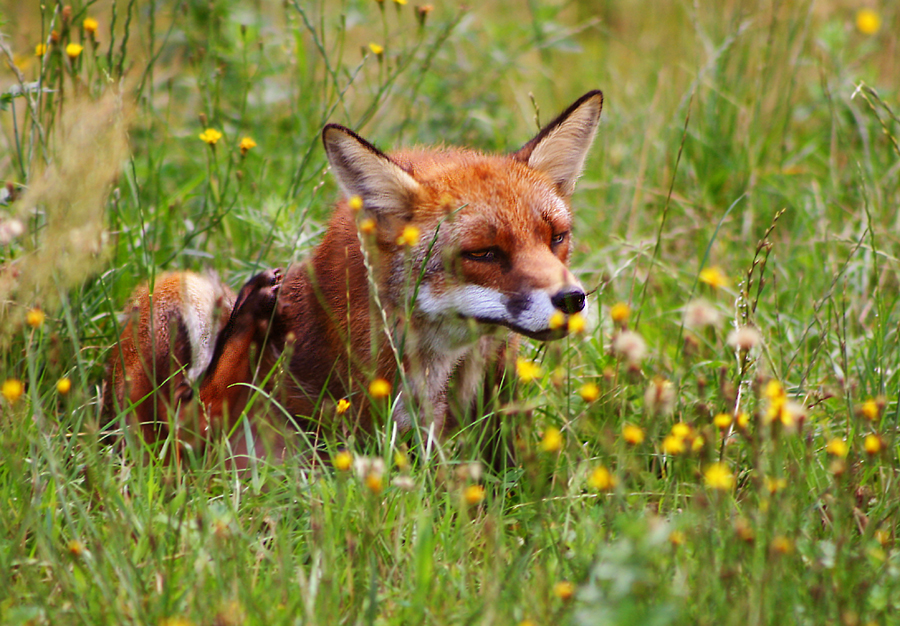
Red fox

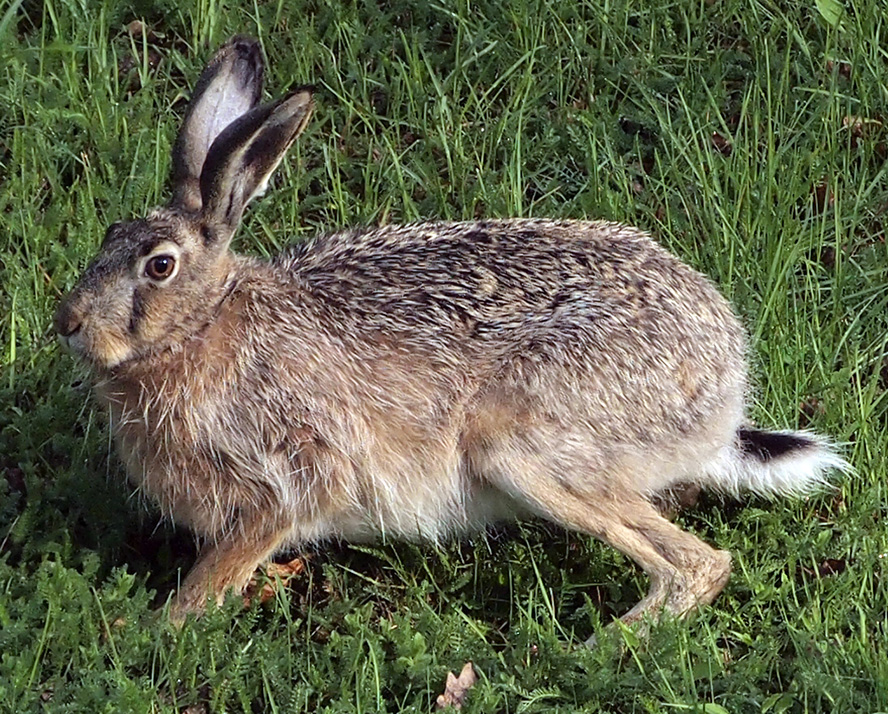
Brown hare

== Maintenance ==
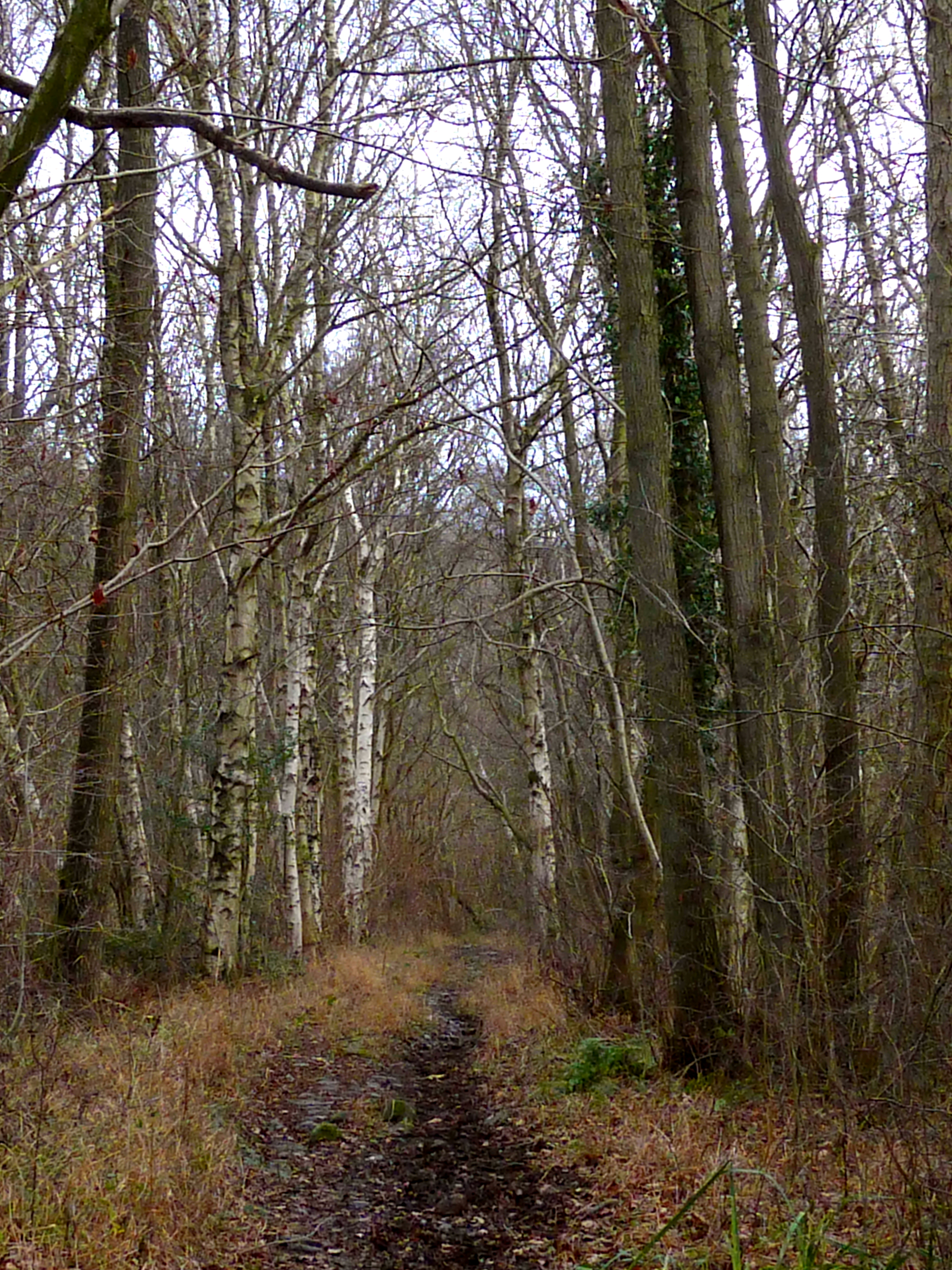
A deer path through silver birches at Carr Myers

In the flush and spring fen, the underground aquifers which waterlog this site contain particular minerals, and it is the combination of the minerals and water levels which affects the diversity of plant life here. Thus the aquifers must be protected from agricultural and commercial water abstraction, and from industrial contamination such as pollution and fertiliser. Light grazing by cattle is recommended to keep the springs clear, and light, seasonal trampling of the fen by cattle is considered an advantage. However enrichment of soil by cowpats and animal feed is discouraged, because the protected fen plants require poor soil.

Regarding the lowland wet woodland, or carr, the recommendation is for minimum disturbance. This allows trees to mature, fall, and create clearings, while maintaining the delicate balance of fragile soils. Clearings permit a variation of wind, sun and shadow, promoting growth of a variety of understorey plants. It might sometimes be necessary to clear vegetation, or even coppice some trees, to maintain areas of light in the carr. Natural England suggests that public access near deep pools and potentially falling trees should be restricted.

Cow Myers is located in the Nidderdale Area of Outstanding Natural Beauty, and sometimes the organisation's volunteers are brought in to assist with maintenance.

== Development and risk assessment ==
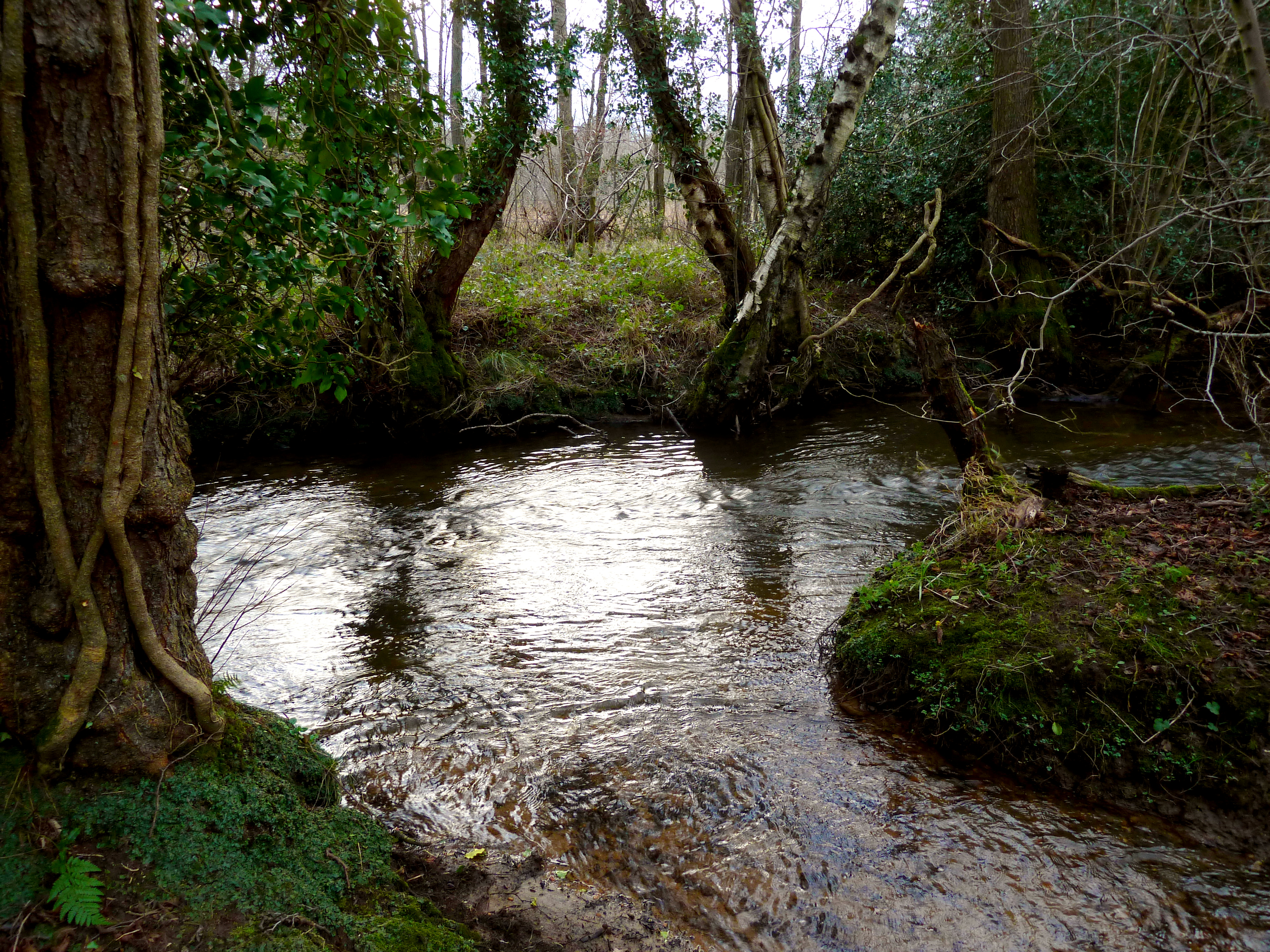
Kex Beck, which runs through Carr Myers

The site was last officially assessed in September and October, 2012. It was judged that Area One, 2.9549 hectares (0.02955 km^{2}; 0.01141 sq mi) of "broadleaved mixed and yew woodland (lowland)," was in favourable condition. Area Two, 7.1664 hectares (0.07166 km^{2}; 0.02767 sq mi) of "lowland fen, marsh and swamp," was in unfavourable and recovering condition. Some parts of Area Two were in favourable condition with diverse flora including bird's eye primrose, however the fen areas needed more horse and cattle grazing to prevent scrub from encroaching. Area Three, 5.1578 hectares (0.05158 km^{2}; 0.01991 sq mi) of "lowland broadleaved, mixed and yew woodland," was judged favourable, although encroachment of Himalayan balsam was noted.

In 2004, Cow Myers was considered for the Ripon Flood Defence Scheme, by the Agriculture and Wetlands Technical Group, as a flood management area. This would potentially have had an effect on water levels and retention of biodiversity. In 2014 it was noted by the Environment Agency that chemicals from slug pellets, possibly originating in agriculture further upstream, were contaminating the water at Cow Myers. In an undated document from North Yorkshire County Council's Minerals and Waste Plan, the effect on neighbouring SSSIs including Cow Myers was considered.

== See also ==
Other SSSIs near Harrogate are as follows: Bishop Monkton Ings, Brimham Rocks, Farnham Mires, Hack Fall Wood, Hay-a-Park, Kirk Deighton Mar Field Fen, Quarry Moor, and Ripon Parks.
