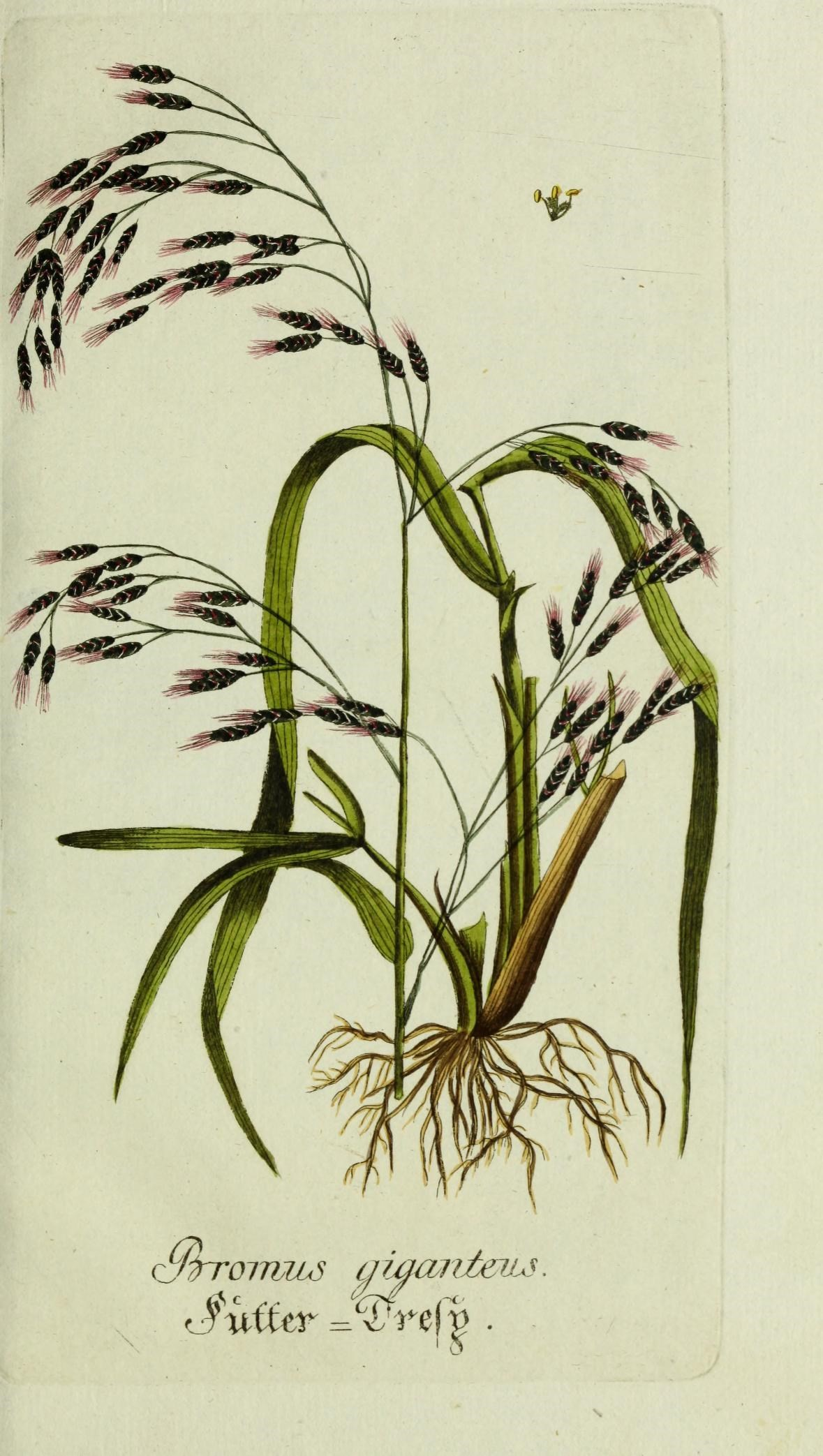

Scientific classification
- Kingdom: Plantae
- Clade: Embryophytes
- Clade: Tracheophytes
- Clade: Spermatophytes
- Clade: Angiosperms
- Clade: Monocots
- Clade: Commelinids
- Order: Poales
- Family: Poaceae
- Subfamily: Pooideae
- Genus: Lolium
- Species: L. giganteum

Binomial name
- Lolium giganteum (L.) Darbysh.

= Lolium giganteum =

Giant fescue

Species of grass

Lolium giganteum, giant fescue, is a woodland grass that grows on neutral to base-rich soils, often near streams or other damp places. It is native to Europe and much of Asia and has been introduced to parts of North America.

Most publications have used the names Festuca gigantea or, more recently, Schedonorus giganteus for this species, but DNA studies appear to have settled a long debate that it should be included within the genus Lolium instead.

== Description ==
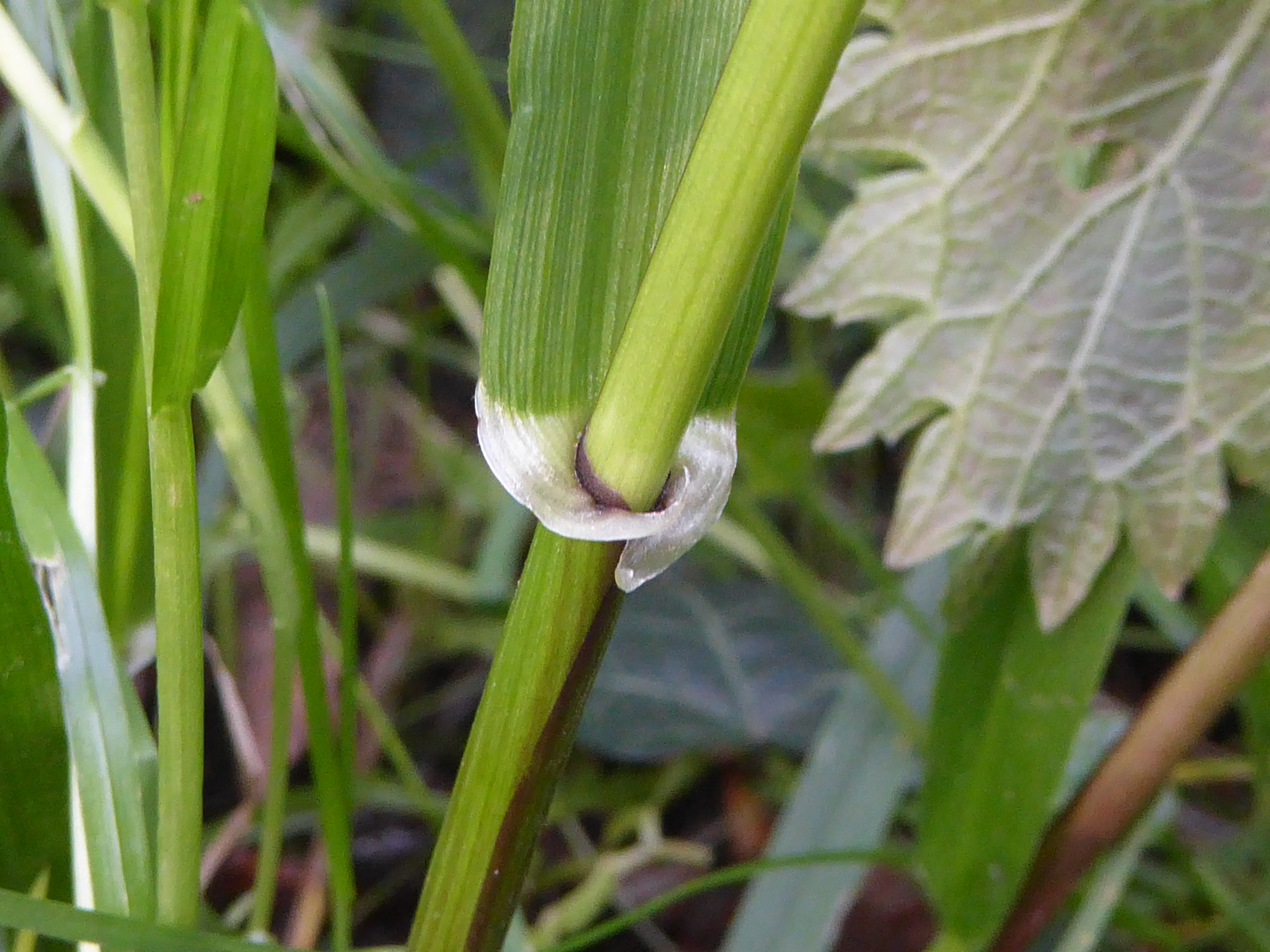
Ligule and auricles of giant fescue, showing the purple colouration

Giant fescue is a loosely tufted perennial with erect to spreading hollow flowering stems up to about 1.4 m (4 ft) tall (exceptionally up to 165 cm), with purple nodes. They are quite hairless (glabrous), including the leaf sheaths. At the top of the sheath is a short (2 mm) ligule and pointed auricles that can wrap around the stem. The leaf blade is flat, up to about 15 mm wide, and glabrous. The tillers (non-flowering stems) are typically shorter but otherwise similar to the culms.

Flowering typically occurs in late summer, from mid-July until early September, with a loose, nodding open panicle about 40 cm (18 inches) long. The branches are normally in pairs with long stalks below the numerous (up to about 16) spikelet. Each spikelet is 10-17 mm long and has between 4 and 8 bisexual florets and two short, unequal glumes. The lower glume typically has only 1 nerve whereas the upper one has 3. The lemmas have long (up to 22 mm) awns arising from the back just below the tip. Each floret has 3 stamens with anthers about 3 mm long. The fruit is a nut or caryopsis with the seed tightly enclosed by the hardened lemma and palea.

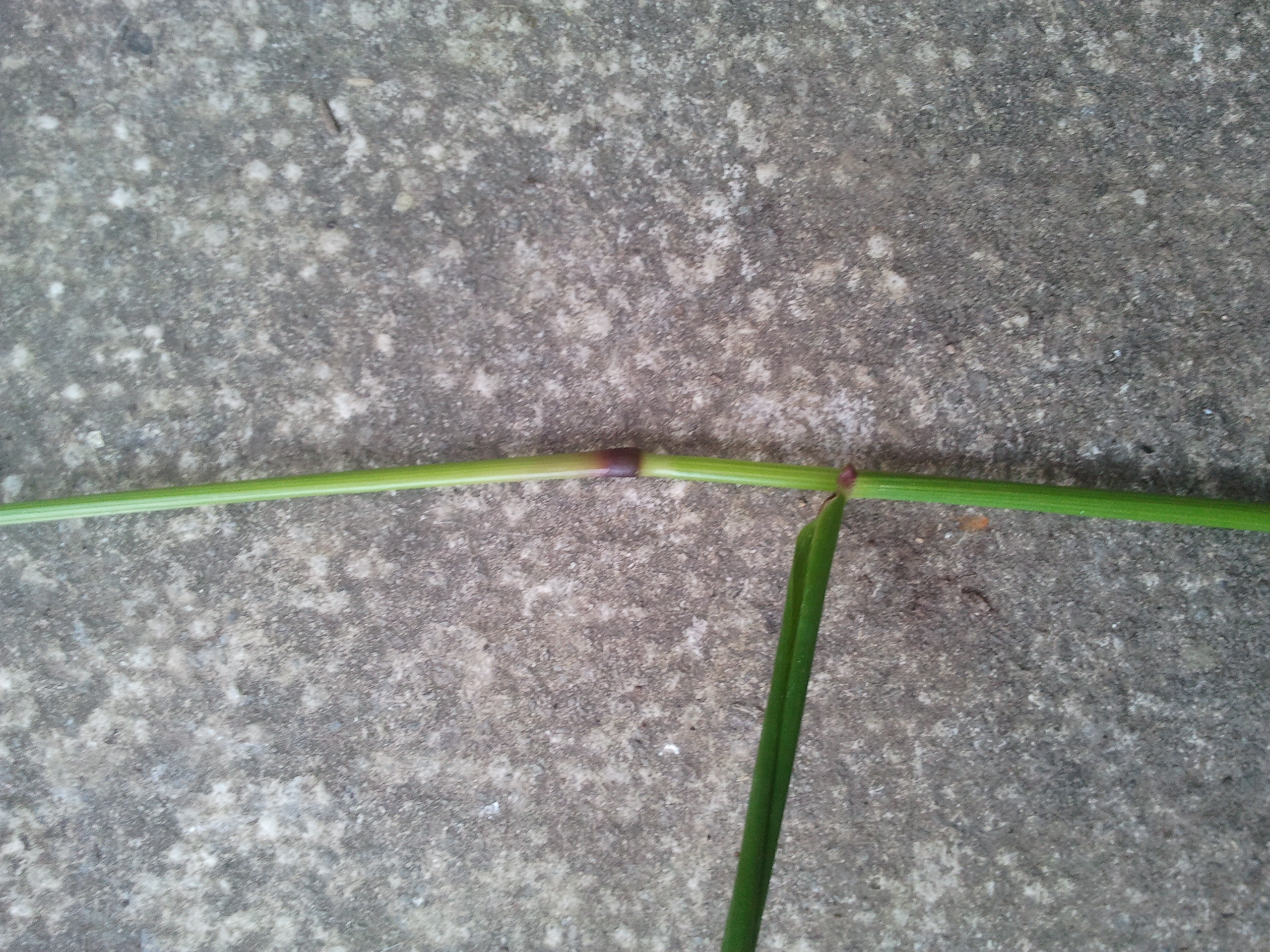
The nodes are usually bright purple

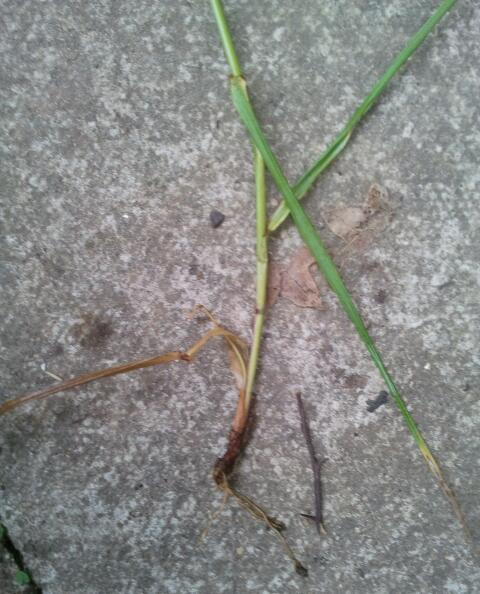
base of the plant

== Taxonomy ==
This species was originally included within the genus Festuca, owing to the similarity of the flowers and inflorescences. However, there has been much debate since 1898 about its relationship to the genus Lolium, largely because of hybridization with Lolium perenne (species in separate genera are far less likely to form hybrids than those within the same genus). Recent DNA studies have shown that it should indeed be considered a ryegrass (Lolium) rather than a fescue (Festuca) because these species are more closely related to each other, despite the fact that ryegrasses have inflorescences of spikes rather than racemes.

Its chromosome number is 2n = 42.

Giant fescue produces fertile hybrids with perennial ryegrass and Italian ryegrass, hence the confusion with its phylogeny and identification.

== Habitat and ecology ==
It is a common plant found especially on heavy, neutral and calcareous soils, in woodland, hedge banks and shady places. It is said to grow best in moist woods.

== Nutrition value ==
Cattle and horses will readily eat its abundant foliage.

== Similar species ==
Festuca altissima is similar but is found in rocky woods, has spikelets which droop much more but are half as long, and ligules 3mm long.
