= Butterbur (disambiguation) =

Butterbur is the common name of several plants in the genus Petasites.

Butterbur may also refer to:

- Barliman Butterbur, a character in The Lord of the Rings
- Hydraecia petasitis or butterbur, a species of moth in the family Noctuidae

== Plants ==
- Petasites albus or white butterbur, a flowering plant species in the daisy family, Asteraceae
- Petasites fragrans, an ornamental flowering plant in the daisy family, Asteraceae
- Petasites hybridus, a herbaceous perennial flowering plant in the daisy family Asteraceae, native to Europe and northern Asia and used as an herbal remedy for migraines.
- Petasites spurius, a flowering plant of the genus Petasites of the family Asteraceae

== See also ==
- Coltsfoot (disambiguation)
