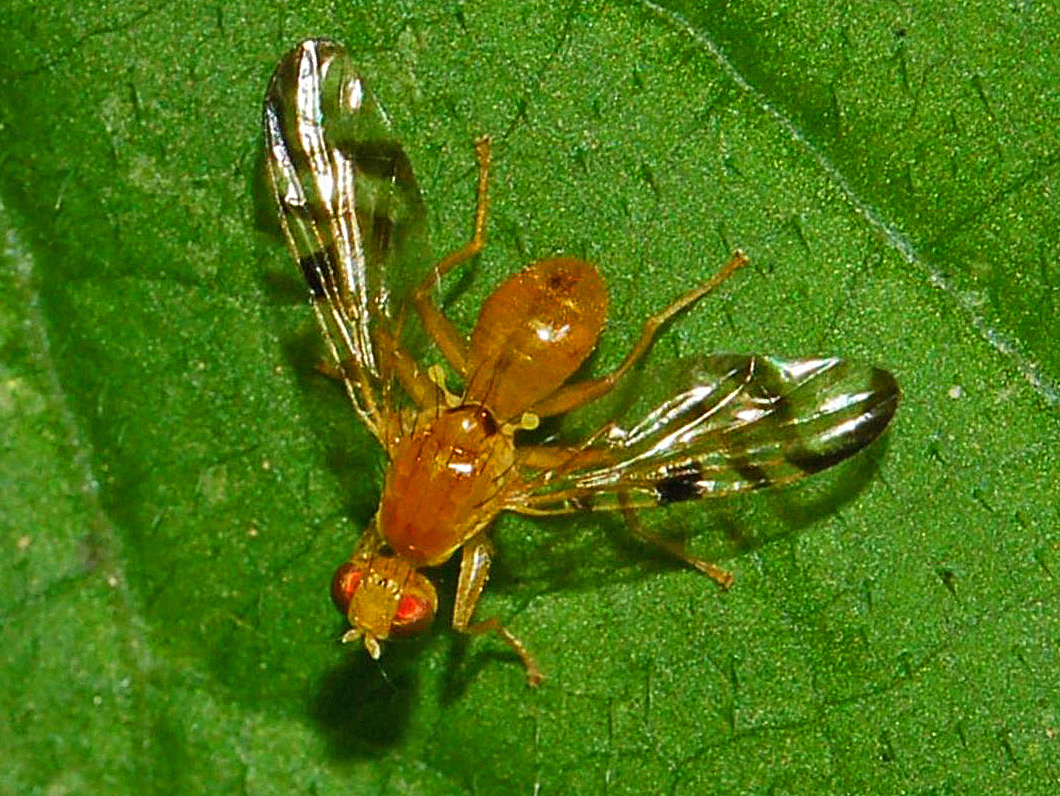
- Acidia cognata. Dorsal view

Scientific classification
- Kingdom: Animalia
- Phylum: Arthropoda
- Clade: Pancrustacea
- Class: Insecta
- Order: Diptera
- Family: Tephritidae
- Genus: Acidia
- Species: A. cognata

Binomial name
- Acidia cognata (Wiedemann, 1817)

Synonyms
- Tephritis cognata Wiedemann, 1817

= Acidia cognata =

Species of fly

Acidia cognata is a species of fly in the family Tephritidae.

== Distribution ==
This species can be found in most of Europe, including Great Britain, Ireland, the Netherlands, Belgium, Albania, Austria, Bulgaria, Czech Republic, Denmark, Finland, France, Germany, Hungary, Italy, Lithuania, Norway, Poland, Romania, Russia, Slovakia, Sweden, Switzerland, UkraineAnd Brazil. @

== Habitat ==
These flies mainly occur in meadows and spruce forest edges.

== Description ==
Acidia cognata is a relatively large species, the body length reaching 6.5–7.0 millimetres (0.26–0.28 in), while the wing length reaches 4.9–6.9 millimetres (0.19–0.27 in). It has a golden orange-brown body. The head is pale yellow-white, with bright red eyes and a dull stripe on the forehead. The wings are markedly colored and shows five dark grey or brownish bands, which are interconnected. The first bandage begins at the base of the wings, while the fifth band lies on the wing tip.

== Biology ==
Adults flies from May until early October. Larvae are oligophagous leaf miners of a variety of plants in the family Asteraceae, mainly feeding from August until October on Arctium lappa, Petasites fragrans, Petasites albus, Petasites hybridus, Petasites paradoxus, Petasites spurius, Homogyne alpine and Tussilago farfara. Pupation occurs externally, in the soil.

== Gallery ==
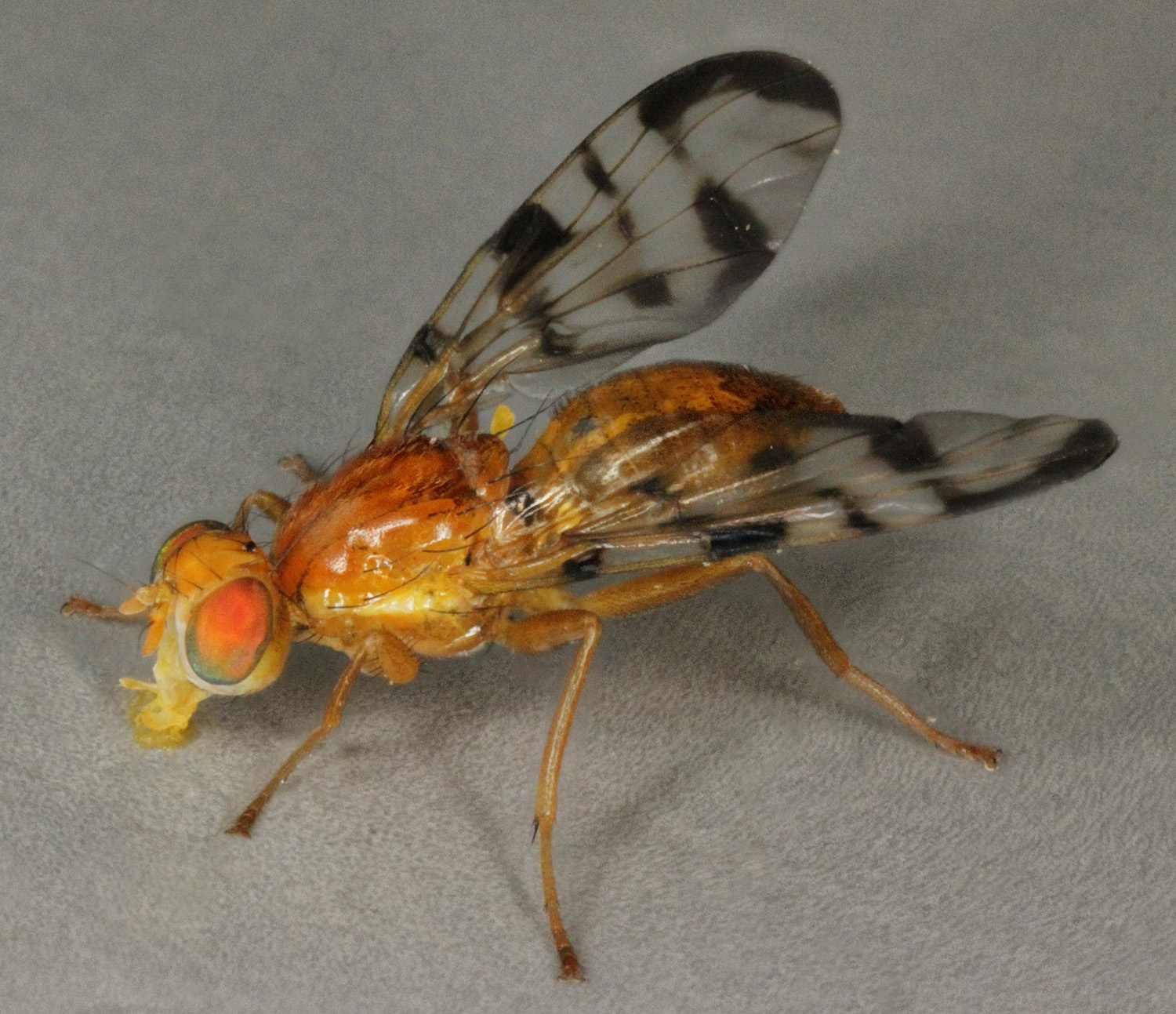
Acidia cognata. Side vies

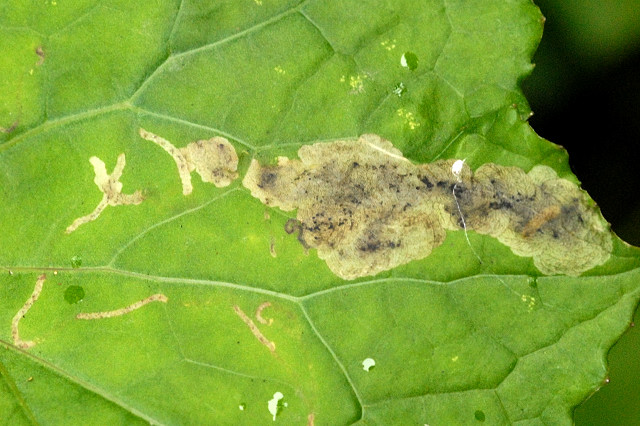
Leaf mine caused by Acidia cognata

Video clip
