= Ze339 =

Brand of herbal extracts

Ze339 brand herbal extracts are taken from the leaves of a unique variety (Petzell) of the butterbur (Petasites hybridus) plant. Petzell is grown on GAP-managed farms in Europe.

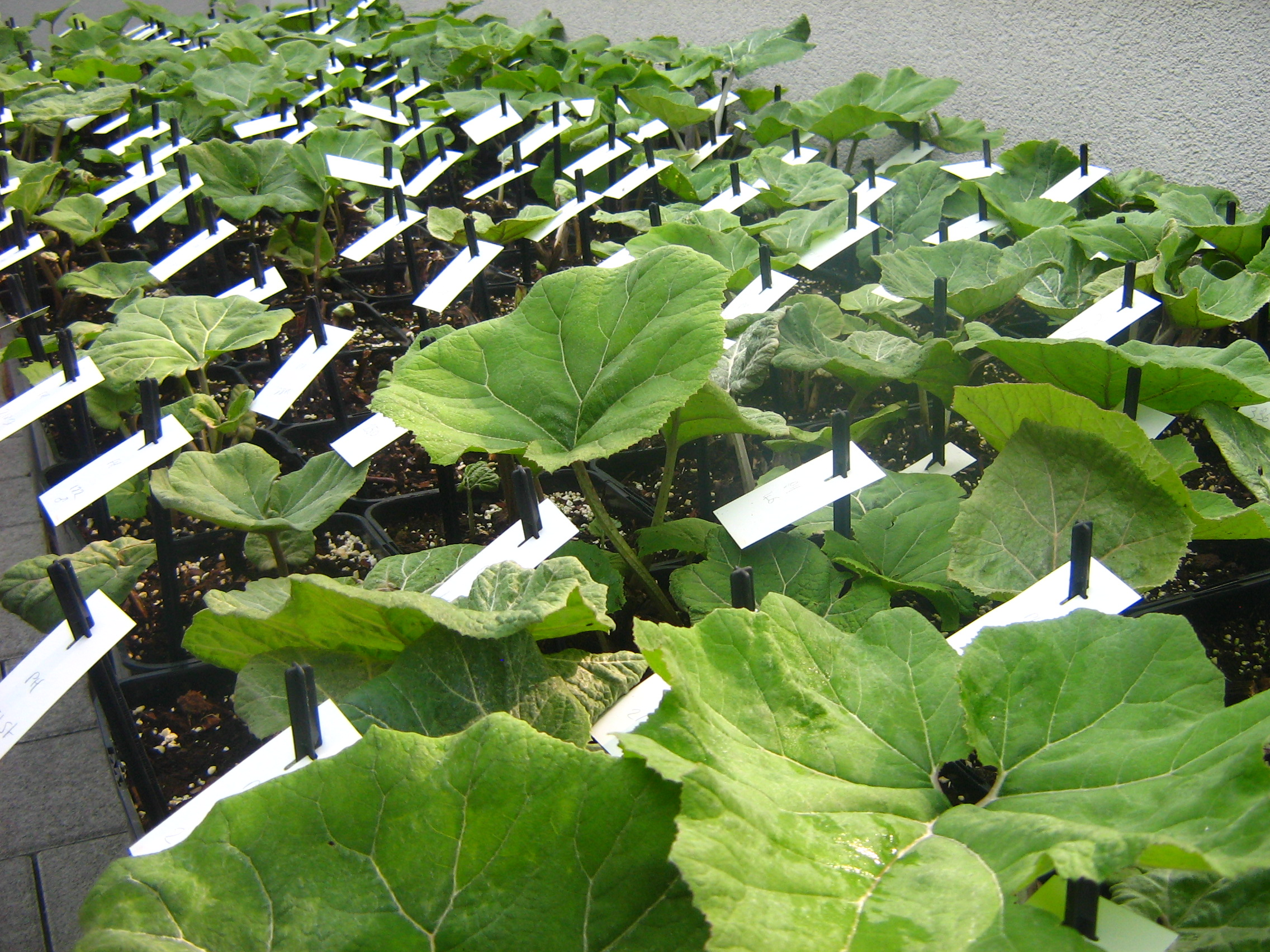
Petzell plants prepared for planting

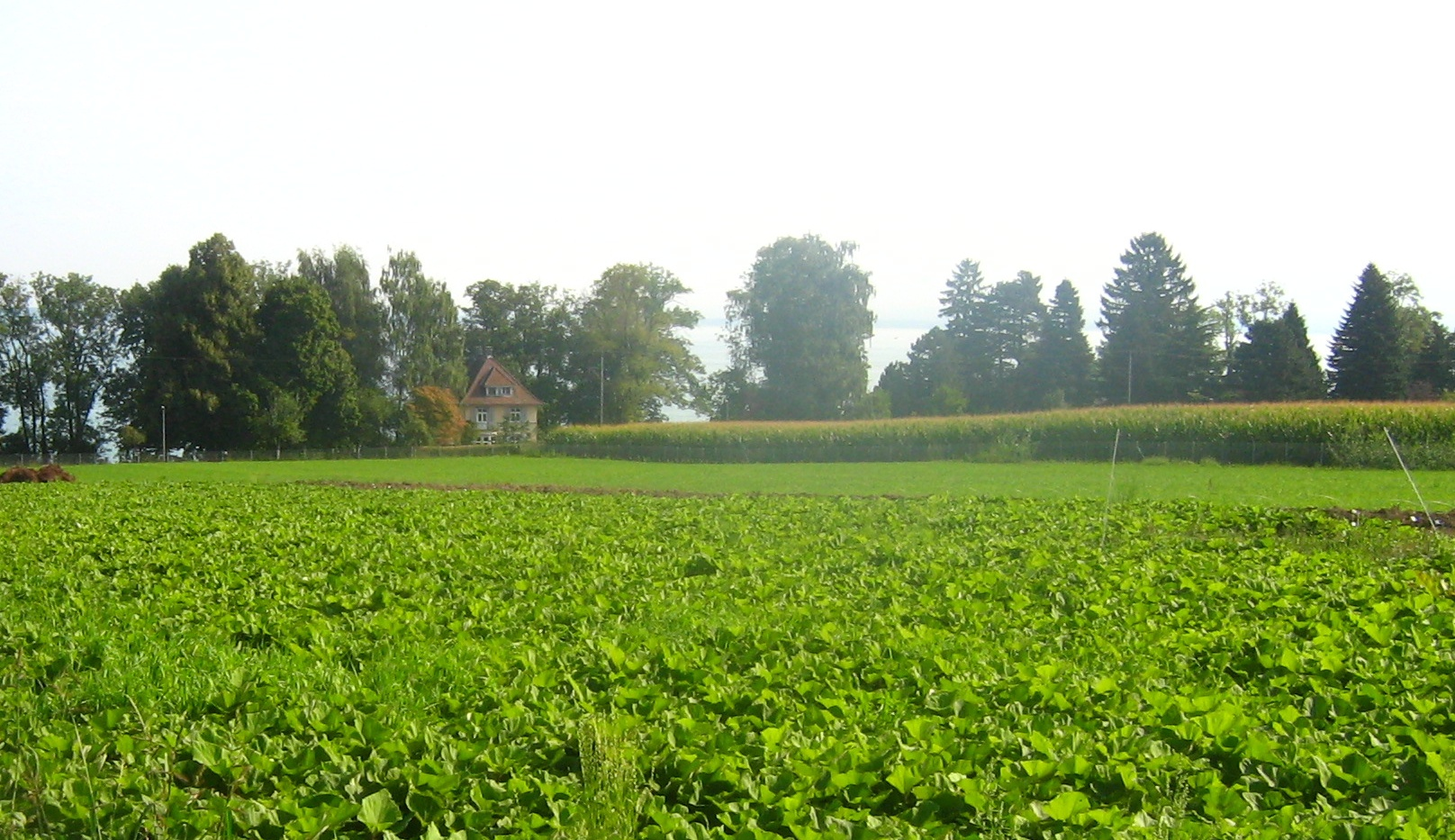
Field of Petasites hybridus growing on a Swiss farm

== Availability ==
In Switzerland, South Korea and Brazil, tablets containing Ze339 brand herbal extracts are marketed under the brand name Tesalin. Ze339 is marketed in the US as Zarbee's Naturals Seasonal Relief.

== Seasonal allergic rhinitis ==
Ze339 is indicated for seasonal allergic rhinitis (hay fever). The ingredient has been evaluated in placebo-controlled, double-blind clinical studies. Ze339 was shown to be as effective as the antihistamines cetirizine and fexofenadine. Against desloratadine, an improved version of loratadine, Ze339 had better efficacy in relieving congestion and other allergy symptoms. In these studies, Ze339 was shown to be less sedating than cetirizine and fexofenadine.

== Pharmacology ==
Ze339 brand extract is not an antihistamine and represents a symptomatic treatment with very different properties. In-vitro studies show that petasins in Ze339 brand extract inhibit leukotriene biosynthesis and block degranulation in activated mast cells and eosinophils.
