= Coltsfoot =

Coltsfoot is the common name for several plants in the family Asteraceae:

- Homogyne alpina, a plant species native to Europe
- Petasites, a plant genus native to Europe, Asia, and North America
- Tussilago farfara, a plant species native to Europe and parts of Asia and Africa

== See also ==
- Butterbur (disambiguation)
- Coltsfoot Green, a small hamlet in Suffolk, England
- Coltsfoot Rock, a confectionery product
