= Hypenidium roborowskii =

Scientific classification
- Kingdom: Animalia
- Phylum: Arthropoda
- Class: Insecta
- Order: Diptera
- Family: Tephritidae
- Subfamily: Tephritinae
- Tribe: Noeetini
- Genus: Hypenidium
- Species: H. roborowskii

Binomial name
- Hypenidium roborowskii (Becker, 1908)

Synonyms
- Hemilea roborowskii Becker, 1908

Species of fly

Hypenidium roborowskii is a species of tephritid or fruit flies in the genus Acidogona of the family Tephritidae.

== Distribution ==
Caucasus, Central Asia, Afghanistan, China.
