= Scrobipalpula tussilaginis =

Scientific classification
- Kingdom: Animalia
- Phylum: Arthropoda
- Clade: Pancrustacea
- Class: Insecta
- Order: Lepidoptera
- Family: Gelechiidae
- Genus: Scrobipalpula
- Species: S. tussilaginis

Binomial name
- Scrobipalpula tussilaginis (Stainton, 1867)

Synonyms
- Gelechia tussilaginis Stainton, 1867; Lita tussilaginella Heinemann, 1870; Gelechia hofmanella Frey, 1870; Xystophora retusella Rebel, 1891

Species of moth

Scrobipalpula tussilaginis is a moth in the family Gelechiidae. The original publication for the name (as Gelechia tussilaginis) appears to be by Stainton in 1867, but it is sometimes attributed to Frey. It is found in Great Britain, Sweden, the Netherlands, France, Germany, Denmark, Austria, Switzerland, Italy, Poland, the Czech Republic, Slovakia, Slovenia, Hungary, Romania, the North Macedonia, Greece, Ukraine and Russia.

The wingspan is 12–14 mm. Adults are on wing from June to July and again from August to September in two generations per year.

The larvae feed on Petasites albus, Petasites hybridus and Tussilago farfara. They mine the leaves of their host plant.
