= Isopetasin =

- Isopetasin representation

Names
- IUPAC name (1R, 2R, 8aR)-7-Isopropy lidene-1 8a-dimethyl-6-oxo-1,2,3,4,6,7,8,8a-octahydro-2-naphthalenyl (2Z)-2-methyl-2-butenoate
- Systematic IUPAC name 2-BUTENOIC ACID, 2-METHYL-, (1R,2R,8AR)-1,2,3,4,6,7,8,8A-OCTAHYDRO-1,8A-DIMETHYL-7-(1-METHYLETHYLIDENE)-6-OXO-2-NAPHTHALENYL ESTER, (2Z)-

Identifiers
CAS Number	469-26-1
3D model (JSmol)	Interactive image
ChEMBL	ChEMBL3291074
UNII	D5LUE47SS6
- InChI: InChI=1S/C20H28O3/c1-7-13(4)19(22)23-18-9-8-15-10-17(21)16(12(2)3)11-20(15,6)14(18)5/h7,10,14,18H,8-9,11H2,1-6H3/b13-7-/t14-,18+,20+/m0/s1
- SMILES: C/C=C(/C)\C(=O)O[C@@H]1CCC2=CC(=O)C(=C(C)C)C[C@@]2([C@H]1C)C

Properties
Chemical formula	C_{20}H_{28}O_{3}
Molar mass	316.441 g·mol^{−1}
Melting point	89–91 °C (192–196 °F; 362–364 K)
Solubility in water	Moderately soluble
Solubility	Highly soluble in organic solvents such as ethanol.
Dipole moment	Nonpolar molecule

Related compounds
Related compounds	S-Isopetasin
- Except where otherwise noted, data are given for materials in their standard state (at 25 °C [77 °F], 100 kPa). Infobox references

Isopetasin is a bioactive sesquiterpene found in Petasite plants belonging to the terpenoid family. Isopetasin is suggested to have anti-inflammatory, analgesic and antispasmodic properties. These contribute to the medicinal effects of Petasites extracts, commonly used to treat migraines, allergies, asthma and respiratory disorders.

== Extraction ==
The extraction and isolation of petasin derivatives from Petasites hybridus presents challenges for obtaining high-purity compounds with high yields. Compounds from P. hybridus are traditionally isolated using chromatographic techniques, such as preparative thin-layer chromatography or semi-preparative HPLC. Liquid-liquid chromatography (LLC) is another separative method for natural products separation increasingly used. As this method is not efficient to dissociate isopetasin from other compounds such as petasin and neopetasin, a second step using preparative HPLC is therefore necessary to achieve its isolation. The techniques for identifying isolated compounds are liquid chromatography with high-resolution tandem mass spectrometry (LC-HRMS/MS) and nuclear magnetic resonance (NMR). Isopetasin is usually obtained with a purity of 95%.

== Synthesis ==
Synthesizing isopetasin is challenging because of its complex structure and the need for precise control of its shape. Over time, scientists have explored different ways to make this molecule more efficiently.

The first total synthesis of isopetasin was reported in 1996 and involved a complex 15-step process requiring precise control over stereochemistry. One of the most critical steps is an enzymatic resolution that ensured the correct configuration of three chiral centers, essential for the molecule's biological activity. The synthesis starts with an expensive precursor and relies on multiple transformations, including oxidation, reduction, and cyclization reactions, to build the bicyclic core of isopetasin. Key reactions such as Robinson annulation and aldol condensation are used to establish the rigid sesquiterpenoid structure. However, this method has significant drawbacks: it is lengthy, required costly reagents, and has a low overall yield due to material loss in purification steps. These constraints make large-scale production impractical and limit the synthesis of isopetasin in research laboratories.

Although the first synthesis method provided important insights, its complexity and low yield led to the development of a quicker and more efficient approach.

Instead of using expensive precursors, this new approach starts with carvone, a readily available and inexpensive terpenoid. The process begins with a catalytic allylic oxidation, followed by a stereoselective conjugate addition, which simplifies the formation of the bicyclic core while maintaining stereochemical control. Additional steps, including aldol cyclization and selective alkylation, further refine the molecular structure. By eliminating the need for enzymatic resolution and optimizing reaction conditions, this method improves yield, lowers production costs, and makes large-scale synthesis more practical.

== Potential medicinal applications ==
=== Application in migraine treatment ===
Butterbur (Petasites hybridus) has been used for centuries in Northern Eurasia and America for fever, respiratory disease, and spasm treatment. Its extract was recently observed for migraine prevention due primarily to petasin and isopetasin, the active constituents. However, petasin is unstable and spontaneously converts to isopetasin, and thus standardization is unavoidable.

Several hypotheses have been put forward to elucidate the anti-migraine effects of petasin and isopetasin. These compounds inhibit enzymes such as phospholipase A2, lipoxygenase, and cyclooxygenase-2 (COX-2), leading to a reduction in inflammatory mediators like leukotrienes and prostaglandins, particularly PGE2, which are implicated in migraine inflammation. Additionally, petasins influence L-type high-voltage calcium channels, which play a role in pain modulation. They also exhibit antimuscarinic activity and inhibit the release of calcitonin gene-related peptide (CGRP), a part in the onset of migraine attacks.

In vivo tests on mice, rats, and human native and recombinant systems revealed that isopetasin activates TRPA1 channels of sensory neurons preferentially with a contribution to desensitization of nociceptor and without activation of TRPV1 or TRPV4 channels. TRPA1 and TRPV1 ion channels, which are located in nociceptive sensory neurons, are involved in pain sensation and are important because they allow the passage of Ca^{2+} ions. They are drug targets. Mustard oil activation of TRPA1 and capsaicin activation of TRPV1 lead to the release of CGRP from dura mater and trigeminal ganglion but Petasites hybridus inhibits these ion channels, reducing CGRP release in meningeal afferents during migraine attacks.

Like parthenolide, isopetasin induces desensitization of peptidergic primary sensory neurons, either specifically targeting the TRPA1 channel or extending to other TRP channel activators and non-TRP depolarizing agents. The shift from homologous to heterologous desensitization appears to depend on the concentration and duration of isopetasin exposure.

The ability of isopetasin to inhibit neurogenic inflammation beyond the trigeminal innervation may explain its effectiveness in inflammatory conditions like arthritis and allergic rhinitis.

Clinical studies have demonstrated that butterbur extracts containing isopetasine can reduce migraine frequency by up to 50%, offering effectiveness comparable to conventional treatments like beta-blockers but with fewer side effects. However, it is essential to ensure the use of purified, PA-free extracts, as raw butterbur contains pyrrolizidine alkaloids (PAs), which can be toxic to the liver.

=== Application in cancer treatment ===
Isopetasin and S-isopetasin, can address the problem of resistance to anti-cancer drugs, notably by targeting P-glycoprotein (P-gp). This protein, encoded by the ABCB1 gene, belongs to the ABC family of transporters and is found in the plasma membranes of many cells. Its role is to limit the intracellular accumulation of various drugs by expelling them, which contributes to the drug resistance observed in cancer cells.

Studies have shown that isopetasine and S-isopetasine bind to specific amino acids of the P-gp protein, thereby disrupting its function. Their mode of action is similar to that of verapamil, a first-generation P-gp inhibitor. These molecules appear to have two main effects: they increase the accumulation of anti-cancer drugs in resistant cells, and they activate the P-gp ATPase enzyme, responsible for converting ATP into ADP. As drug expulsion by P-gp requires energy from ATP, this activation disrupts the process, reducing P-gp's ability to reject these drugs. In addition, P-gp dysfunction can cause stress in the mitochondria, leading to increased ATP production and reactive oxygen species (ROS). These excess ROS can trigger cell death (apoptosis) in tumor cells. Thus, isopetasin and S-isopetasin could induce cancer cell death by oxidative stress, reinforcing their therapeutic potential. This dual action, as both P-gp inhibitors and cancer cell toxicants, makes these compounds interesting candidates for treating treatment-resistant cancers.

=== Application to reduce the inflammatory and allergic effects ===
Isopetasin also appears to inhibit the production of cysteinyl-leukotrienes (cysteinyl-LT), powerful mediators generated by eosinophilic cells. Eosinophils play a crucial role in inflammation and in aggravating the symptoms of allergic diseases by amplifying the inflammatory response, notably through the production of cytokines, chemokines and other lipid mediators.
