= Hypenidium graecum =

Scientific classification
- Kingdom: Animalia
- Phylum: Arthropoda
- Class: Insecta
- Order: Diptera
- Family: Tephritidae
- Subfamily: Tephritinae
- Tribe: Noeetini
- Genus: Hypenidium
- Species: H. graecum

Binomial name
- Hypenidium graecum Loew, 1862

Synonyms
- Hemilea novakii Strobl, 1893; Acidia pulchella Tavares, 1902; Stephanaciura bipartita Séguy, 1930

Species of fly

Hypenidium graecum is a species of tephritid or fruit flies in the genus Acidogona of the family Tephritidae.

== Distribution ==
Spain, Portugal, Morocco, Hungary, Bosnia, Greece, Ukraine, Israel.
