= Noeta =

Noeta may refer to:

- noeta (singular 'noetos'), a Greek word in philosophy referring to the realm of intelligible realm and aspects of it and of mind/nous: noumena, noesis, noema, noosphere, noology/noetics, etc.
- Noeeta or Noeta, a genus of fruit fly
