= Trigonochorium oculatum =

Scientific classification
- Kingdom: Animalia
- Phylum: Arthropoda
- Class: Insecta
- Order: Diptera
- Family: Tephritidae
- Subfamily: Tephritinae
- Tribe: Noeetini
- Genus: Trigonochorium
- Species: T. oculatum

Binomial name
- Trigonochorium oculatum Becker, 1913

Species of fly

Trigonochorium oculatum is a species of tephritid or fruit flies in the genus Trigonochorium of the family Tephritidae.

== Distribution ==
Iran.
