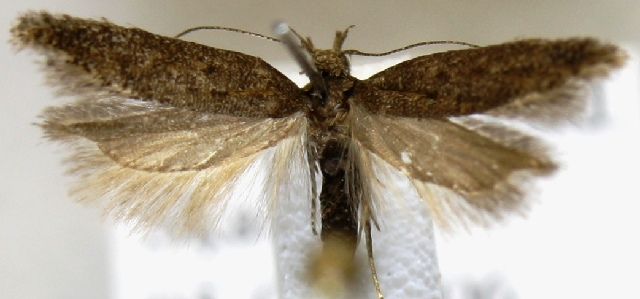

Scientific classification
- Kingdom: Animalia
- Phylum: Arthropoda
- Clade: Pancrustacea
- Class: Insecta
- Order: Lepidoptera
- Family: Gelechiidae
- Genus: Scrobipalpa
- Species: S. pauperella

Binomial name
- Scrobipalpa pauperella (Heinemann, 1870)

Synonyms
- Lita pauperella Heinemann, 1870; Scrobipalpa (Euscrobipalpa) klimeschi Povolný, 1967

= Scrobipalpa pauperella =

Species of moth

Scrobipalpa pauperella is a moth in the family Gelechiidae. It was described by Hermann von Heinemann in 1870. It is found in Great Britain, Luxembourg, Spain, France, Germany, Austria, Switzerland, Italy, the Czech Republic, Slovakia, Poland, Hungary, Romania, Ukraine, Belarus, Estonia, Latvia, Russia, Sweden, Finland, Afghanistan, Transbaikal and China (Gansu, Inner Mongolia, Ningxia).

The wingspan is 10–13 mm (0.39–0.51 in).

The larvae feed on Centaurea scabiosa, Petasites albus, Serratula tinctoria Cirsium palustre and Cirsium helenioides. They mine the leaves of their host plant. The mine on Cirsium is thought to resemble the mines of Scrobipalpa acuminatella. The larvae are probably stem borers on Centaurea.
