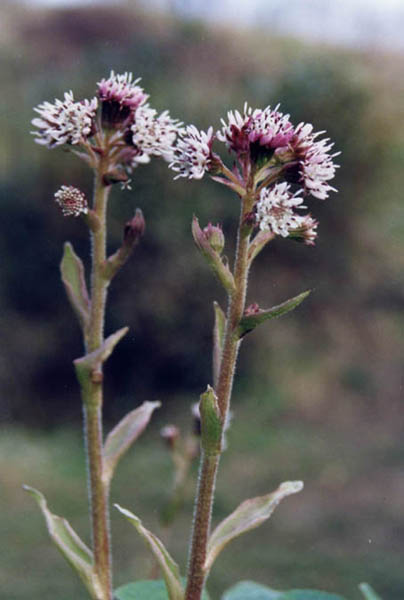

Scientific classification
- Kingdom: Plantae
- Clade: Embryophytes
- Clade: Tracheophytes
- Clade: Angiosperms
- Clade: Eudicots
- Clade: Asterids
- Order: Asterales
- Family: Asteraceae
- Genus: Petasites
- Species: P. pyrenaicus

Binomial name
- Petasites pyrenaicus (Loefl.) G.López

Synonyms
- Petasites fragrans C.Presl; Tussilago fragrans Vill.

= Petasites pyrenaicus =

Winter heliotrope

Species of flowering plant in the daisy family

Petasites pyrenaicus, the winter heliotrope, is a medicinal and ornamental flowering plant in the family Asteraceae.

== Description ==
This perennial grows from deep rhizomes. The leaves are large, suborbicular and up to 20 cm across and stalked with small regular teeth. The species is dioecious, male and female flowers being borne on separate plants. The erect flower-heads grow in short racemes on stems up to 25 cm long with a few scale-leaves. The florets are pinkish-mauve and appear in December in Ireland and from January to March in Great Britain. The flowers have a vanilla-like scent. Other species to be found in Ireland and Great Britain: Petasites hybridus (L.) P.Gaertner, B. Meyer & Scherb, Petasites albus (L.) Gaertner. and Petasites japonicus (Siebold & Zucc.) Maxim.

== Distribution ==
Petasites pyrenaicus is native to the Mediterranean region of Europe, including Italy, Sicily, Sardinia and north Africa. It was introduced to Great Britain in 1806 where it has become naturalized. It was recorded in the wild by at least 1835 in Middlesex It is also introduced and naturalized in Ireland. Female plants are unknown in the British Isles. The male plant is grown as an ornamental in gardens and some churchyards, and was well established by the start of the 20th century.

== Ecology ==
Common on shady roadside banks. The underground rhizomes allow it to spread and its large leaves can shade out other plants. It is considered an invasive plant but can be controlled by cultivation or weedkiller.
