= Acidogona melanura =

Scientific classification
- Kingdom: Animalia
- Phylum: Arthropoda
- Class: Insecta
- Order: Diptera
- Family: Tephritidae
- Subfamily: Tephritinae
- Tribe: Noeetini
- Genus: Acidogona
- Species: A. melanura

Binomial name
- Acidogona melanura Loew, 1873

Synonyms
- Trypeta melanura Loew, 1873; Acidogona melaneura Curran, 1934

Species of fly

Acidogona melanura is a species of tephritid or fruit flies in the genus Acidogona of the family Tephritidae.

== Distribution ==
Canada, United States.
