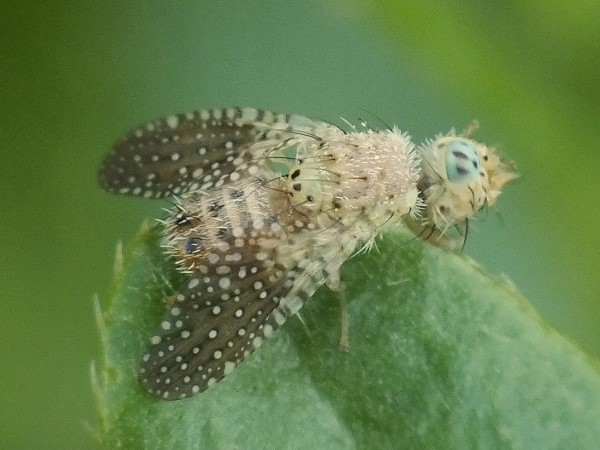

Scientific classification
- Kingdom: Animalia
- Phylum: Arthropoda
- Class: Insecta
- Order: Diptera
- Family: Tephritidae
- Subfamily: Tephritinae
- Tribe: Noeetini
- Genus: Paracanthella
- Species: P. pavonina

Binomial name
- Paracanthella pavonina (Portschinsky, 1875)

Synonyms
- Carphotricha pavonina Portschinsky, 1875)

= Paracanthella pavonina =

Species of fly

Paracanthella pavonina is a species of tephritid or fruit flies in the family Tephritidae.

== Distribution ==
From Bulgaria and Russia (West Siberia) to Central Asia.
