= Jamesomyia geminata =

Scientific classification
- Kingdom: Animalia
- Phylum: Arthropoda
- Class: Insecta
- Order: Diptera
- Family: Tephritidae
- Subfamily: Tephritinae
- Tribe: Noeetini
- Genus: Jamesomyia
- Species: J. geminata

Binomial name
- Jamesomyia geminata (Loew, 1862)

Synonyms
- Trypeta geminata Loew, 1862)

Species of fly

Jamesomyia geminata is a species of tephritid or fruit flies in the genus Jamesomyia of the family Tephritidae.

== Distribution ==
Canada & United States.
