= Ensina decisa =

Scientific classification
- Kingdom: Animalia
- Phylum: Arthropoda
- Class: Insecta
- Order: Diptera
- Family: Tephritidae
- Subfamily: Tephritinae
- Tribe: Noeetini
- Genus: Ensina
- Species: E. decisa

Binomial name
- Ensina decisa Wollaston, 1858

Species of fly

Ensina decisa is a species of tephritid or fruit flies in the genus Ensina of the family Tephritidae.

== Distribution ==
Madeira, Canary Islands.
