= Noeeta crepidis =

Scientific classification
- Kingdom: Animalia
- Phylum: Arthropoda
- Class: Insecta
- Order: Diptera
- Family: Tephritidae
- Subfamily: Tephritinae
- Tribe: Noeetini
- Genus: Noeeta
- Species: N. crepidis

Binomial name
- Noeeta crepidis Hering, 1936

Species of fly

Noeeta crepidis is a species of tephritid or fruit flies in the genus Noeeta of the family Tephritidae.

== Distribution ==
Germany, Austria, Hungary, Ukraine, Southwest Russia.
