= Noeeta alini =

Scientific classification
- Kingdom: Animalia
- Phylum: Arthropoda
- Class: Insecta
- Order: Diptera
- Family: Tephritidae
- Subfamily: Tephritinae
- Tribe: Noeetini
- Genus: Noeeta
- Species: N. alini

Binomial name
- Noeeta alini (Hering, 1951)

Synonyms
- Pseudonoeeta alini Hering, 1951

Species of fly

Noeeta alini is a species of tephritid or fruit flies in the genus Noeeta of the family Tephritidae.

== Distribution ==
China.
