= Noeeta hemiradiata =

Scientific classification
- Kingdom: Animalia
- Phylum: Arthropoda
- Class: Insecta
- Order: Diptera
- Family: Tephritidae
- Subfamily: Tephritinae
- Tribe: Noeetini
- Genus: Noeeta
- Species: N. hemiradiata

Binomial name
- Noeeta hemiradiata Dirlbek & Dirlbek, 1991

Species of fly

Noeeta hemiradiata is a species of tephritid or fruit flies in the genus Noeeta of the family Tephritidae.

== Distribution ==
Spain.
