= Paracanthella marginemaculata =

Scientific classification
- Kingdom: Animalia
- Phylum: Arthropoda
- Class: Insecta
- Order: Diptera
- Family: Tephritidae
- Subfamily: Tephritinae
- Tribe: Noeetini
- Genus: Paracanthella
- Species: P. marginemaculata

Binomial name
- Paracanthella marginemaculata (Macquart, 1851)

Synonyms
- Acinia marginemaculata Macquart, 1851)

Species of fly

Paracanthella marginemaculata is a species of tephritid or fruit flies in the genus Paracanthella of the family Tephritidae.

== Distribution ==
Asia.
