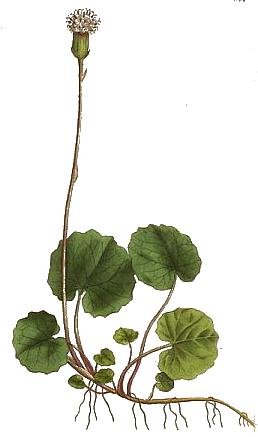

Scientific classification
- Kingdom: Plantae
- Clade: Tracheophytes
- Clade: Angiosperms
- Clade: Eudicots
- Clade: Asterids
- Order: Asterales
- Family: Asteraceae
- Genus: Homogyne
- Species: H. alpina

Binomial name
- Homogyne alpina (L.) Cass.

Synonyms
- Tussilago alpina L.

= Homogyne alpina =

Species of flowering plant

Homogyne alpina, the Alpine coltsfoot or purple colt's-foot, is a rhizomatous herb in the family Asteraceae, which is often used as an ornamental plant. The plant has purple-red flowers, and it is usually associated with the gall flies Ensina sonchi and Acidia cognata.

Homogyne alpina is a perennial plant that reaches a height of 10 to 40 centimeters. The rhizome is creeping woolly and scaly. The stem is erect, reddish brown and often single head. It is hairy silvery-woolly, bare later and usually has 2 leaves on small scales. The leaves are all basal, long-stalked, leathery, coarse and glossy dark green, the underside is lighter. The leaf blade is heart-kidney-shaped.

The flower heads have a diameter up to 15 mm. The bracts are in a single row, crowded and hairy brown-red woolly at the base. The flowers are purple.

== Distribution ==
Homogyne alpina grows in the mountains of South Central Europe at altitudes from 500 to 3 000 meters. The species grows on moist, humus-rich, mossy soil in coniferous forests, bushes and dwarf-shrub heath. In the U.K., it is known from a single location in Angus, Scotland. It is uncertain whether the plant is native or introduced.

== Similar species ==
The felt-like Homogyne discolor is characterized by the under side white, felty leaves.
