= Acidogona dichromata =

Scientific classification
- Kingdom: Animalia
- Phylum: Arthropoda
- Class: Insecta
- Order: Diptera
- Family: Tephritidae
- Subfamily: Tephritinae
- Tribe: Noeetini
- Genus: Acidogona
- Species: A. dichromata

Binomial name
- Acidogona dichromata Snow, 1894

Synonyms
- Xenochaeta dichromata Snow, 1894; Eutreta aurantiaca Doane, 1899

Species of fly

Acidogona dichromata is a species of tephritid or fruit flies in the genus Acidogona of the family Tephritidae.

== Distribution ==
Canada, United States.
