= Noeeta strigilata =

Scientific classification
- Kingdom: Animalia
- Phylum: Arthropoda
- Class: Insecta
- Order: Diptera
- Family: Tephritidae
- Subfamily: Tephritinae
- Tribe: Noeetini
- Genus: Noeeta
- Species: N. strigilata

Binomial name
- Noeeta strigilata (Loew, 1855)

Synonyms
- Trypeta strigilata Loew, 1855

Species of fly

Noeeta strigilata is a species of tephritid or fruit flies in the genus Noeeta of the family Tephritidae.

== Distribution ==
Greece.
