= Ensina brevior =

Scientific classification
- Kingdom: Animalia
- Phylum: Arthropoda
- Clade: Pancrustacea
- Class: Insecta
- Order: Diptera
- Family: Tephritidae
- Subfamily: Tephritinae
- Tribe: Noeetini
- Genus: Ensina
- Species: E. brevior

Binomial name
- Ensina brevior (Hennig, 1940)

Synonyms
- Protensina brevior Hennig, 1940

Species of fly

Ensina brevior is a species of tephritid or fruit flies in the genus Ensina of the family Tephritidae.

== Distribution ==
Peru.
