= Acidogona pendula =

Scientific classification
- Kingdom: Animalia
- Phylum: Arthropoda
- Class: Insecta
- Order: Diptera
- Family: Tephritidae
- Subfamily: Tephritinae
- Tribe: Noeetini
- Genus: Acidogona
- Species: A. pendula

Binomial name
- Acidogona pendula Norrbom, 2010

Species of fly

Acidogona pendula is a species of tephritid or fruit flies in the genus Acidogona of the family Tephritidae.

== Distribution ==
Guatemala.
