= Butter dock =

Butter dock is an ambiguous term for certain plants, based on a misunderstanding of other common names of these. It can mean:

- Petasites hybridus, where it is derived from "Butterfly Dock".
- Rumex obtusifolius, where it may be derived from "Bitter Dock" but is also associated with the historic use of broad-leaf dock to wrap and preserve butter.
