= Paracanthella guttata =

Scientific classification
- Kingdom: Animalia
- Phylum: Arthropoda
- Class: Insecta
- Order: Diptera
- Family: Tephritidae
- Subfamily: Tephritinae
- Tribe: Noeetini
- Genus: Paracanthella
- Species: P. guttata

Binomial name
- Paracanthella guttata Chen, 1938

Species of fly

Paracanthella guttata is a species of tephritid or fruit flies in the genus Paracanthella of the family Tephritidae.

== Distribution ==
Mongolia & China.
