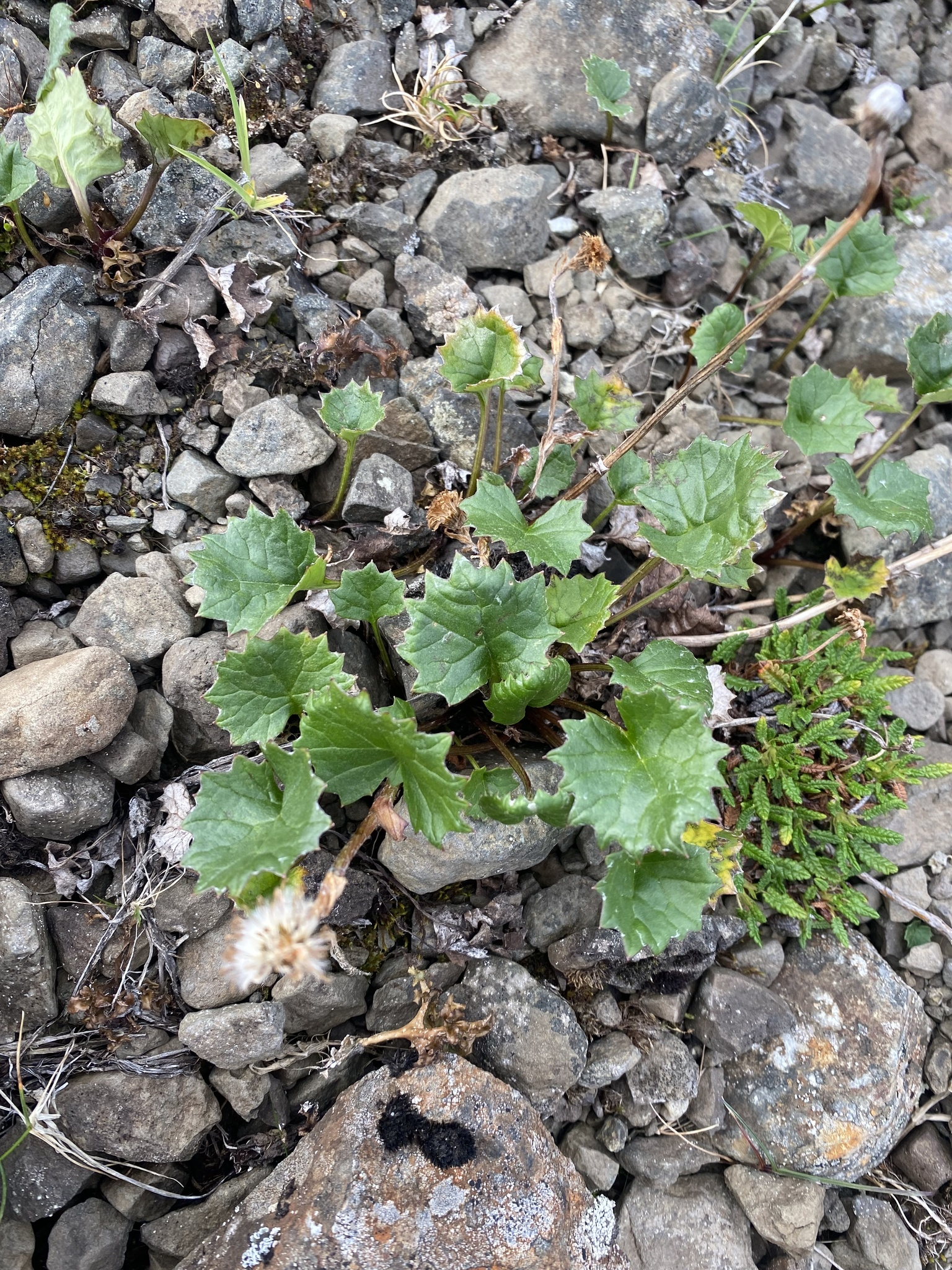

Scientific classification
- Kingdom: Plantae
- Clade: Tracheophytes
- Clade: Angiosperms
- Clade: Eudicots
- Clade: Asterids
- Order: Asterales
- Family: Asteraceae
- Genus: Endocellion
- Species: E. glaciale

Binomial name
- Endocellion glaciale (Ledeb.) Toman

Synonyms
- Nardosmia billingsiana Fisch. ex Herder; Nardosmia glacialis Ledeb.; Petasites glacialis (Ledeb.) Polunin

= Endocellion glaciale =

Species of plant

Endocellion glaciale is a species of flowering plant in the family Asteraceae, native from central Siberia to the northern Russian Far East. It was first described by Carl Friedrich von Ledebour in 1845 as Nardosmia glacialis.
