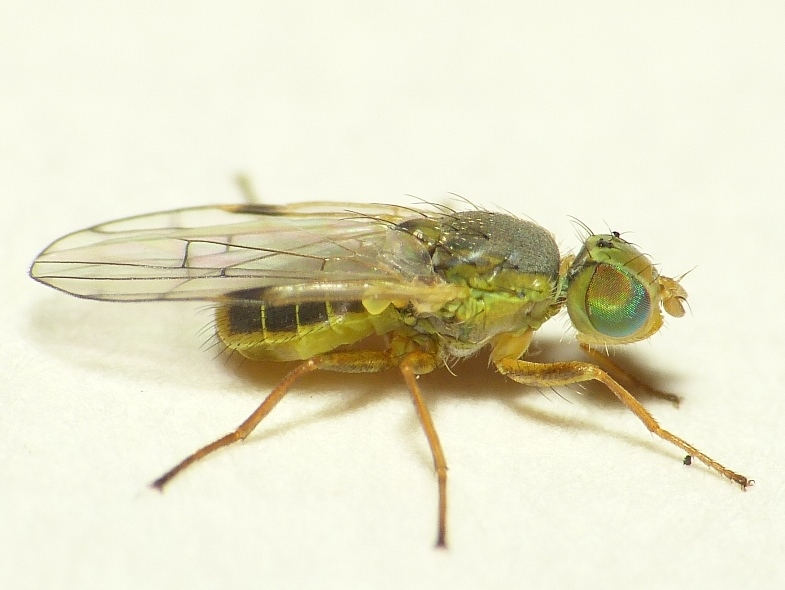
- Ensina sonchi Netherlands

Scientific classification
- Kingdom: Animalia
- Phylum: Arthropoda
- Class: Insecta
- Order: Diptera
- Family: Tephritidae
- Subfamily: Tephritinae
- Tribe: Noeetini
- Genus: Ensina; Robineau-Desvoidy, 1830

Type species
- Trypeta scorzonerae Robineau-Desvoidy, 1830

Synonyms
- Platensina Enderlein, 1911; Tephrostola Bezzi, 1913; Protensina Hendel, 1914; Protensina Hendel, 1914; Platensia Shinji, 1940

= Ensina =

Genus of fly

Ensina is a genus of the family Tephritidae, better known as fruit flies.

== Species ==
- Ensina azorica Frey, 1945
- Ensina brevior (Hennig, 1940)
- Ensina decisa Wollaston, 1858
- Ensina longiceps (Hendel, 1914)
- Ensina sonchi (Linnaeus, 1767)
