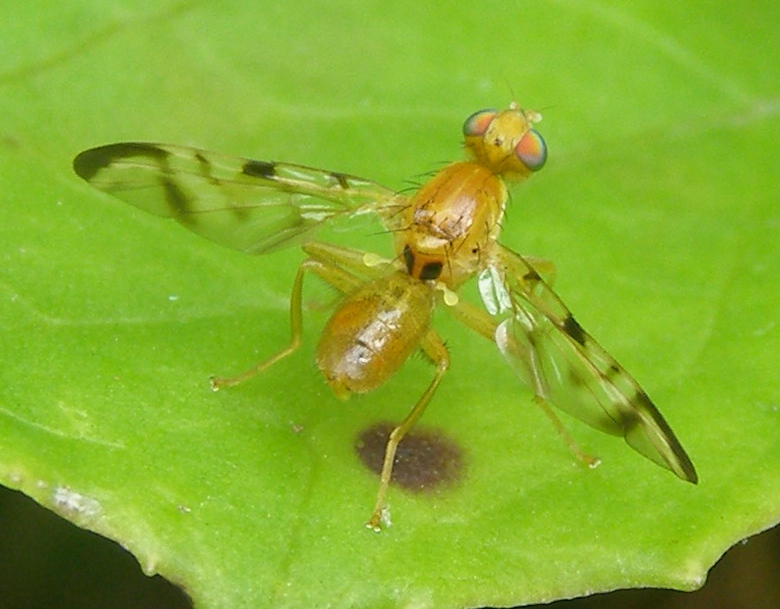
- Acidia cognata

Scientific classification
- Domain: Eukaryota
- Kingdom: Animalia
- Phylum: Arthropoda
- Class: Insecta
- Order: Diptera
- Family: Tephritidae
- Subfamily: Trypetinae
- Tribe: Trypetini
- Genus: Acidia; Robineau-Desvoidy, 1830

= Acidia =

Genus of flies

Acidia is a small genus of flies in the family Tephritidae. It formerly contained many species, but by some authors has since been restricted to two.

== List of species ==
- Acidia cognata (Wiedemann, 1817)
- Acidia japonica Shiraki, 1933
