= Noeeta pupillata =

Scientific classification
- Kingdom: Animalia
- Phylum: Arthropoda
- Class: Insecta
- Order: Diptera
- Family: Tephritidae
- Subfamily: Tephritinae
- Tribe: Noeetini
- Genus: Noeeta
- Species: N. pupillata

Binomial name
- Noeeta pupillata (Fallén, 1814)

Synonyms
- Noeeta brunicosa Robineau-Desvoidy, 1830; Noeeta flavipes Robineau-Desvoidy, 1830; Tephritis lineata Macquart, 1835; Tephritis pupillata Fallén, 1814; Tephritis pupillata Fallén, 1820; Trypeta pardalina Meigen, 1826

Species of fly

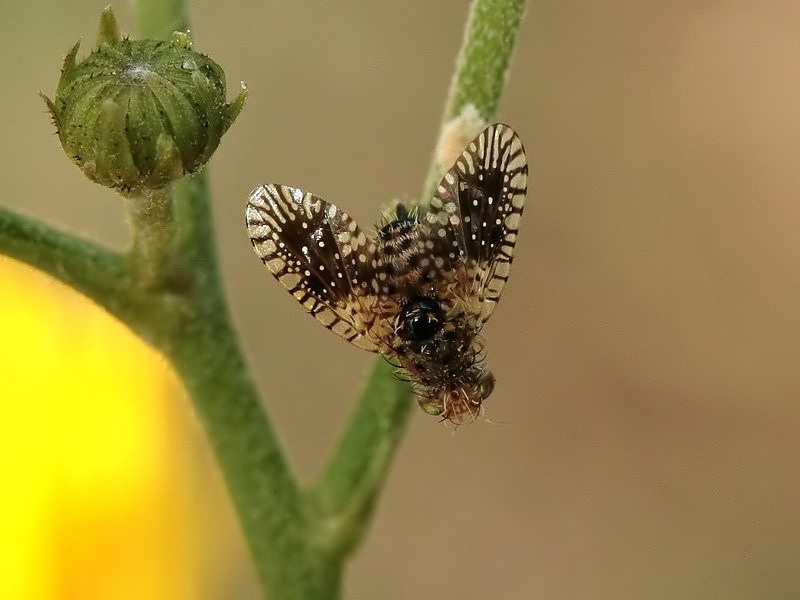
Noeeta pupillata female in the Netherlands

Noeeta pupillata is a species of tephritid or fruit flies in the genus Noeeta of the family Tephritidae.

== Distribution ==
Europe & East Siberia South to central Europe, Ukraine, Caucasus & Mongolia.
