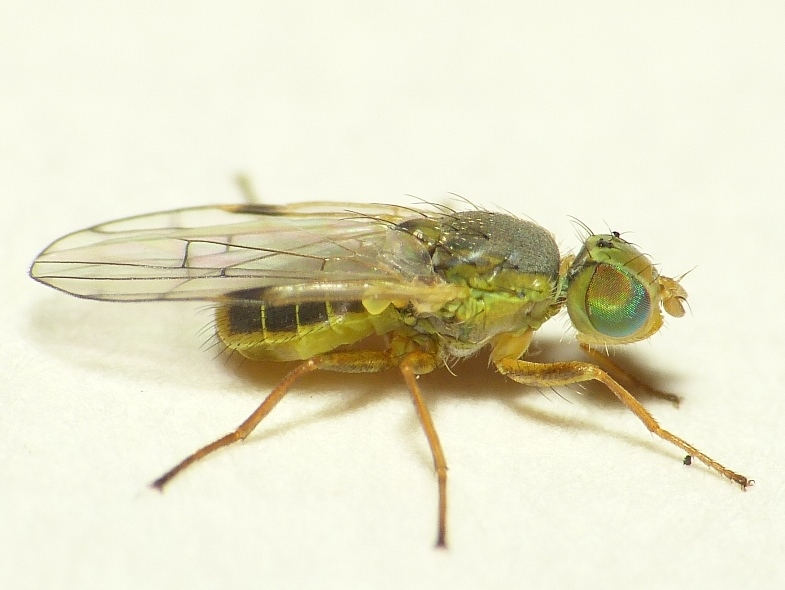
- Ensina sonchi Netherlands

Scientific classification
- Kingdom: Animalia
- Phylum: Arthropoda
- Class: Insecta
- Order: Diptera
- Family: Tephritidae
- Subfamily: Tephritinae
- Tribe: Noeetini
- Genus: Ensina
- Species: E. sonchi

Binomial name
- Ensina sonchi (Linnaeus, 1767)

Synonyms
- Musca subcutanea Linnaeus, 1764; Musca sonchi Linnaeus, 1767; Tephritis sonchi Fallén, 1814; Tephritis sonchi Fallén, 1820; Trypeta obsoleta Wiedemann, 1826; Ensina chrysanthemi Robineau-Desvoidy, 1830; Ensina doronici Robineau-Desvoidy, 1830; Ensina herbarum Robineau-Desvoidy, 1830; Ensina linariae Robineau-Desvoidy, 1830; Ensina pratensis Robineau-Desvoidy, 1830; Ensina scorzonerae Robineau-Desvoidy, 1830; Tephritis asteris Haliday, 1838; Ensina lacteipennis Hendel, 1915; Tephritis mandschurica Hering, 1953; Ensina lactaepennis Shiraki, 1968

= Ensina sonchi =

Species of fly

Ensina sonchi is a species of fly in the family Tephritidae, the gall flies. It is found in the Palearctic. The head is light yellow head. Greenish body with yellow villae. The disc of the mesonotum is blackish. Black mesophragm. The legs and halteres are dirty yellow. Wings vitreous or opaline. Abdomen black: tergites tightly yellow at posterior margin with black villi; rufous sternites; Macrochaetes yellowish. Oviscapte black, apex and sides rufous, with fine, yellowish villi. -Long. : 3-3.5 mm. The larvae feed on the flower heads of Asteraceae (Chondrilla juncea, Cirsium arvense, Cirsium vulgare, Hieracium umbellatum, Hypochaeris radicata Sonchus arvensis, Taraxacum officinale ....).

== Distribution ==
United Kingdom & Scandinavia South to North Africa, East to Japan; introduced to Ethiopia, Taiwan, Philippines, Hawaii.
