= Paracanthella =

Scientific classification
- Domain: Eukaryota
- Kingdom: Animalia
- Phylum: Arthropoda
- Class: Insecta
- Order: Diptera
- Family: Tephritidae
- Subfamily: Tephritinae
- Tribe: Noeetini
- Genus: Paracanthella; Hendel, 1927

Type species
- Carphotricha pavonina Portschinsky, 1875

Genus of flies

Paracanthella is a genus of tephritid or fruit flies in the family Tephritidae.

== Species ==
- Paracanthella guttata Chen, 1938
- Paracanthella marginemaculata (Macquart, 1851)
- Paracanthella pavonina (Portschinsky, 1875)
