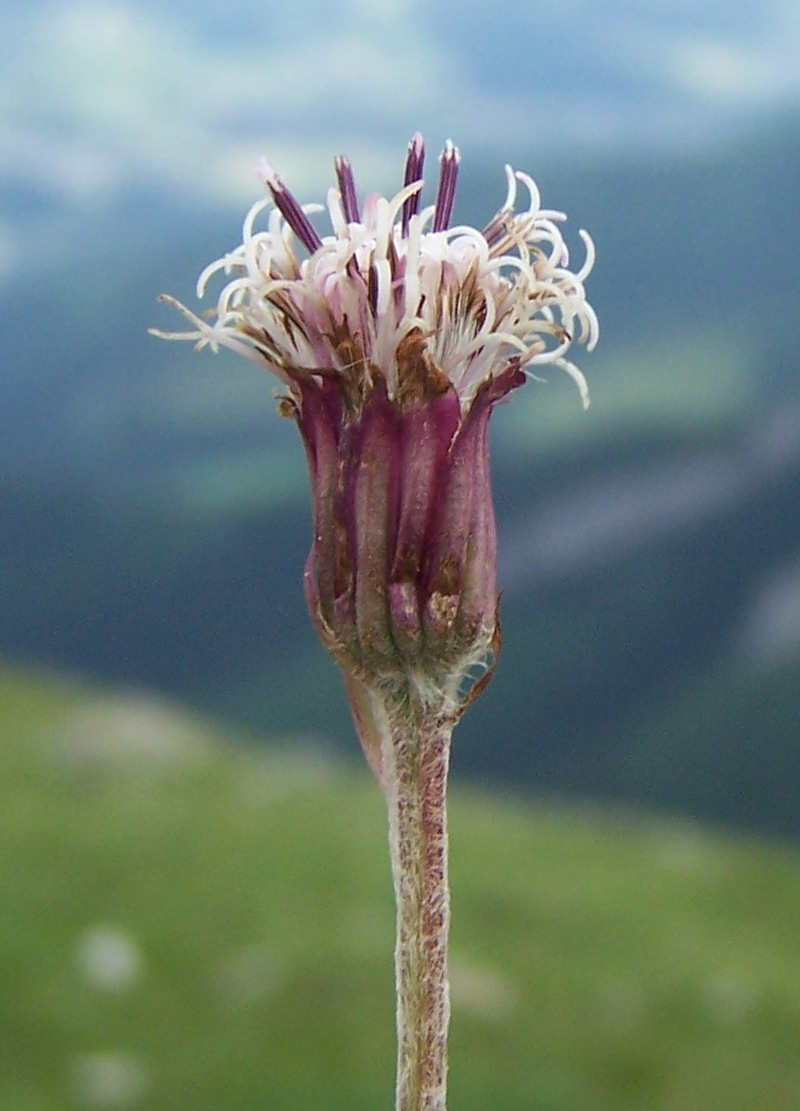
- Homogyne alpina

Scientific classification
- Kingdom: Plantae
- Clade: Embryophytes
- Clade: Tracheophytes
- Clade: Angiosperms
- Clade: Eudicots
- Clade: Asterids
- Order: Asterales
- Family: Asteraceae
- Subfamily: Asteroideae
- Tribe: Senecioneae
- Genus: Homogyne; Cass.

= Homogyne =

Genus of flowering plants

Homogyne is a genus of flowering plants in the daisy family, Asteraceae.

Species

- Homogyne alpina - Europe from Britain + Portugal to Ukraine
- Homogyne ausserdorferi - Austria
- Homogyne discolor - Italy, Austria, Germany, Croatia, Slovenia, Bosnia-Herzegovina
- Homogyne montana - Alps
- Homogyne sylvestris - Italy, Austria, Croatia, Slovenia
