= Hypenidium =

Scientific classification
- Domain: Eukaryota
- Kingdom: Animalia
- Phylum: Arthropoda
- Class: Insecta
- Order: Diptera
- Family: Tephritidae
- Subfamily: Tephritinae
- Tribe: Noeetini
- Genus: Hypenidium; Loew, 1862

Type species
- Hypenidium graecum Loew, 1862

Synonyms
- Stephanaciura Séguy, 1930

Genus of flies

Hypenidium is a genus of tephritid or fruit flies in the family Tephritidae.

== Species ==
- Hypenidium graecum Loew, 1862
- Hypenidium roborowskii (Becker, 1908)
