= Trigonochorium =

Scientific classification
- Domain: Eukaryota
- Kingdom: Animalia
- Phylum: Arthropoda
- Class: Insecta
- Order: Diptera
- Family: Tephritidae
- Subfamily: Tephritinae
- Tribe: Noeetini
- Genus: Trigonochorium

Type species
- Trigonochorium oculatum Becker, 1913

Genus of flies

Trigonochorium is a genus of tephritid or fruit flies in the family Tephritidae.

== Species ==
- Trigonochorium oculatum Becker, 1913
