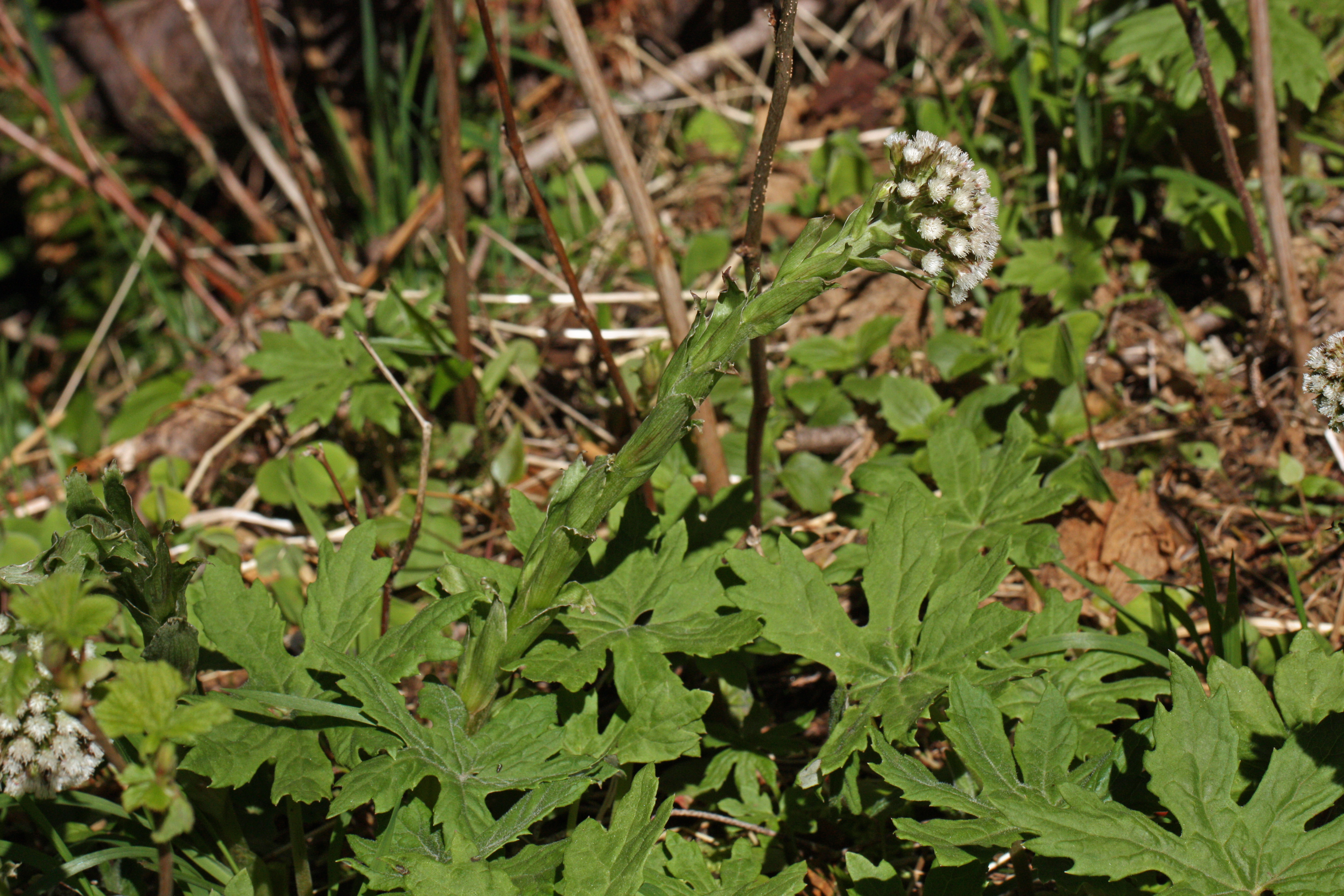
- Arctic sweet coltsfoot

Conservation status
- Secure (NatureServe)

Scientific classification
- Kingdom: Plantae
- Clade: Embryophytes
- Clade: Tracheophytes
- Clade: Spermatophytes
- Clade: Angiosperms
- Clade: Eudicots
- Clade: Asterids
- Order: Asterales
- Family: Asteraceae
- Genus: Petasites
- Species: P. frigidus

Binomial name
- Petasites frigidus (L.) Fr.

Synonyms
- Nardosmia angulosa Kuprian.; Nardosmia angulosa Cass.; Nardosmia arctica (A.E.Porsild) Á.Löve & D.Löve; Nardosmia frigida (L.) Hook.; Nardosmia nivalis (B.D.Greene) Jurtzev; Nardosmia palmata (Aiton) Hook.; Nardosmia sagittata (Banks ex Pursh) Hook.; Nardosmia vitifolia (Greene) Á.Löve & D.Löve* P. alaskanus Rydb.; Petasites arcticus A.E.Porsild; Petasites corymbosus (R.Br.) Rydb.; Petasites dentata Blank.; Petasites gracilis Britton; Petasites hookerianus (Nutt.) Rydb.; Petasites hyperboreus Rydb.; Petasites nivalis Greene; Petasites palmatus (Aiton) A.Gray; Petasites sagittatus (Banks ex Pursh) A.Gray; Petasites speciosus (Nutt.) Piper; Petasites trigonophylla Greene; Petasites × vitifolius Greene; Petasites warrenii H.St.John; Tussilago palmata Aiton; Tussilago frigida L.; Tussilago sagittata Pursh

= Petasites frigidus =

Species of flowering plant in the daisy family

Petasites frigidus, the Arctic sweet coltsfoot or Arctic butterbur, is a species of flowering plant in the family Asteraceae. It is native to Arctic to cool temperate regions of the Northern Hemisphere in northern Europe, northern Asia and northern North America.

It is a herbaceous perennial plant producing flowering stems in early spring, and large leaves through the summer. The upright flowering stems are 10–20 cm (4–8 in) tall, and bear only 5–12 inflorescences, yellowish-white to pink in colour. The leaves are rounded, 15–20 cm (6–8 in) broad, with a deeply cleft base and shallowly lobed margin, and rise directly from the underground rootstock. The underside of the leaves is covered with matted, woolly fuzz. It grows in moist shaded ground, preferring stream banks and seeping ground of cut-banks.

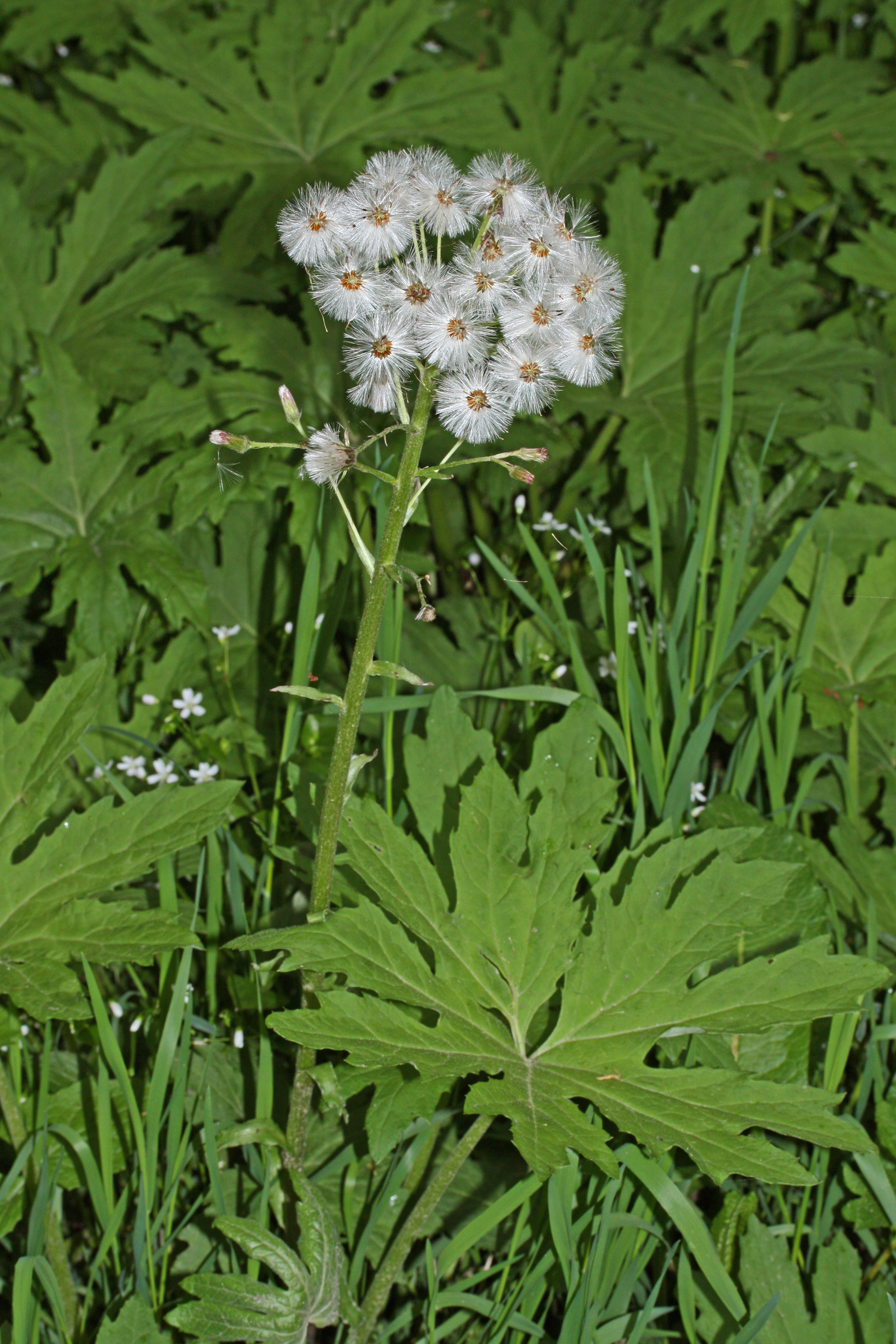
Petasites frigidus var. palmatus fruit and leaves

While there is some disagreement, some sources identify five varieties of P. frigidus:

- Petasites frigidus var. frigidus
- Petasites frigidus var. nivalis, sometimes referred to as P. nivalis or P. hyperboreus. This variety is common at subalpine and alpine elevations.
- Petasites frigidus var. palmatus, sometimes referred to as P. palmatus, palmate coltsfoot, or western coltsfoot; mâl-ē-mē’ (Konkow language); or tä-tä-tē’; pē’-wē is the root.
- Petasites frigidus var. sagittatus, arrowleaf sweet coltsfoot.
- Petasites frigidus var. vitifolius

== Uses ==
The leaf stalks and flower stems (with flowers) are edible, and can be used as a vegetable dish. A salt-substitute can also be made by drying and then burning the leaves. This black, powdery substance will provide a salty taste. However, given the high likelihood of the presence of toxic unsaturated, diester pyrrolizidine alkaloids in this species, consumption should be very limited.
