= Jamesomyia =

Scientific classification
- Domain: Eukaryota
- Kingdom: Animalia
- Phylum: Arthropoda
- Class: Insecta
- Order: Diptera
- Family: Tephritidae
- Subfamily: Tephritinae
- Tribe: Noeetini
- Genus: Jamesomyia; Quisenberry, 1949

Type species
- Trypeta geminata Loew, 1862

Genus of flies

Jamesomyia is a genus of tephritid or fruit flies in the family Tephritidae.

== Species ==
- Jamesomyia geminata (Loew, 1862)
