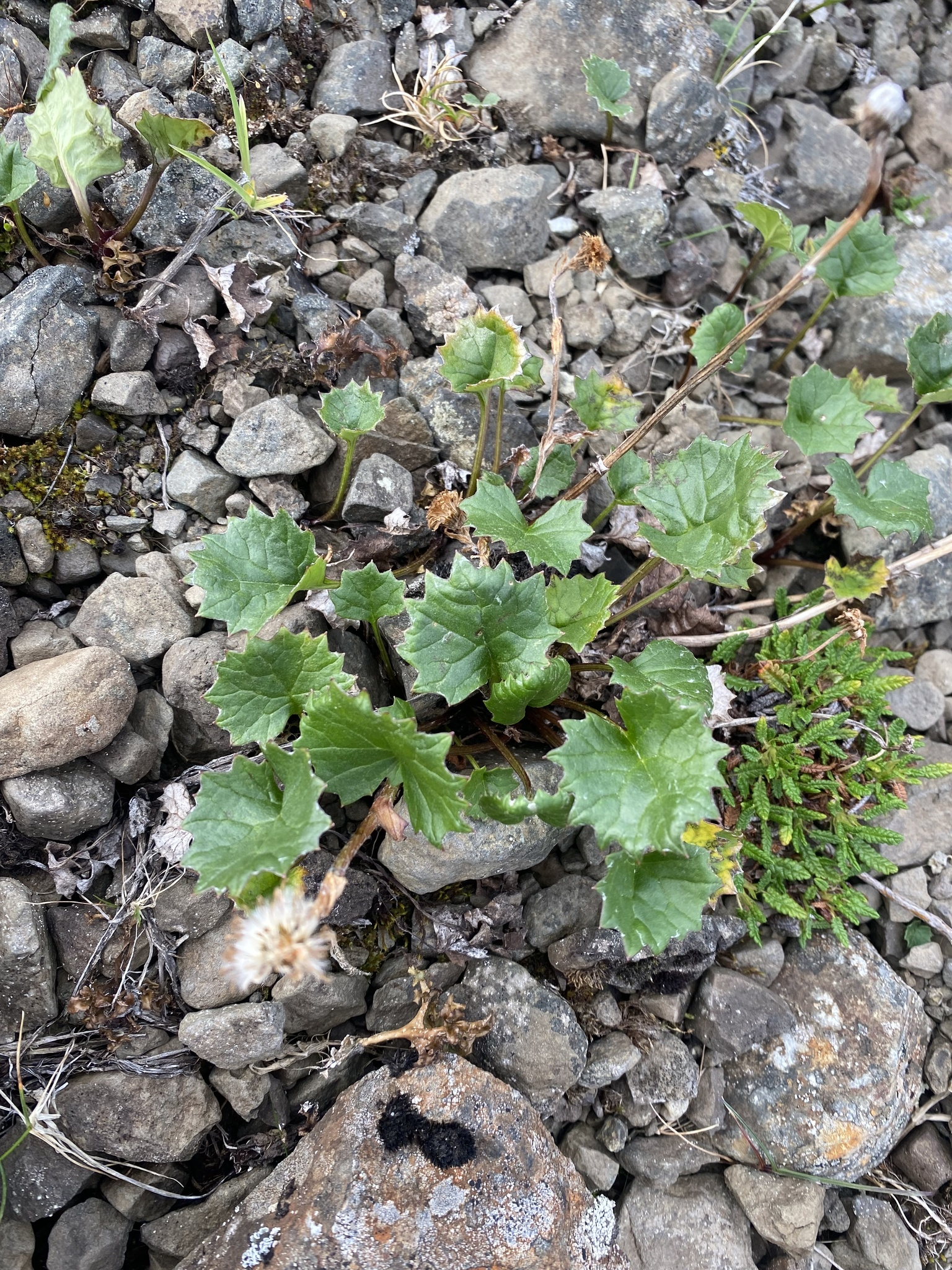
- Endocellion glaciale

Scientific classification
- Kingdom: Plantae
- Clade: Tracheophytes
- Clade: Angiosperms
- Clade: Eudicots
- Clade: Asterids
- Order: Asterales
- Family: Asteraceae
- Tribe: Senecioneae
- Genus: Endocellion; Turcz. ex Herder

Synonyms
- Petasites sect. Endocellion (Turcz. ex Herder) Barkalov

= Endocellion =

Monotypic flowering plant genus in the daisy family

Endocellion is a small genus of flowering plants in the daisy family Asteraceae.

== Species ==
As of June 2023, Plants of the World Online accepted two species:

- Endocellion glaciale (Ledeb.) Toman – central Siberia to the northern Russian Far East
- Endocellion sibiricum (J.F.Gmel.) Toman – northern European Russia to the Russian Far East
