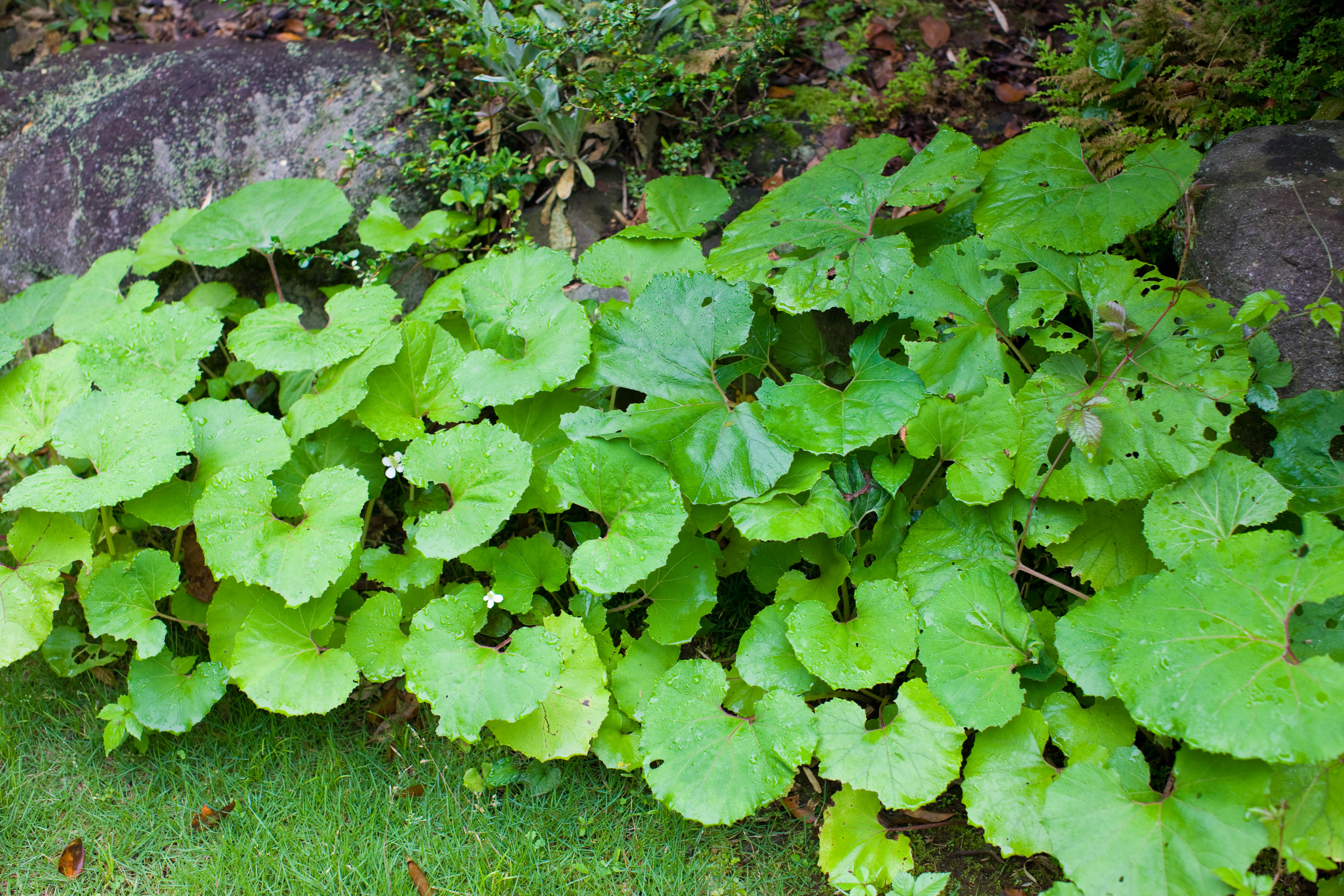
- Adult fuki
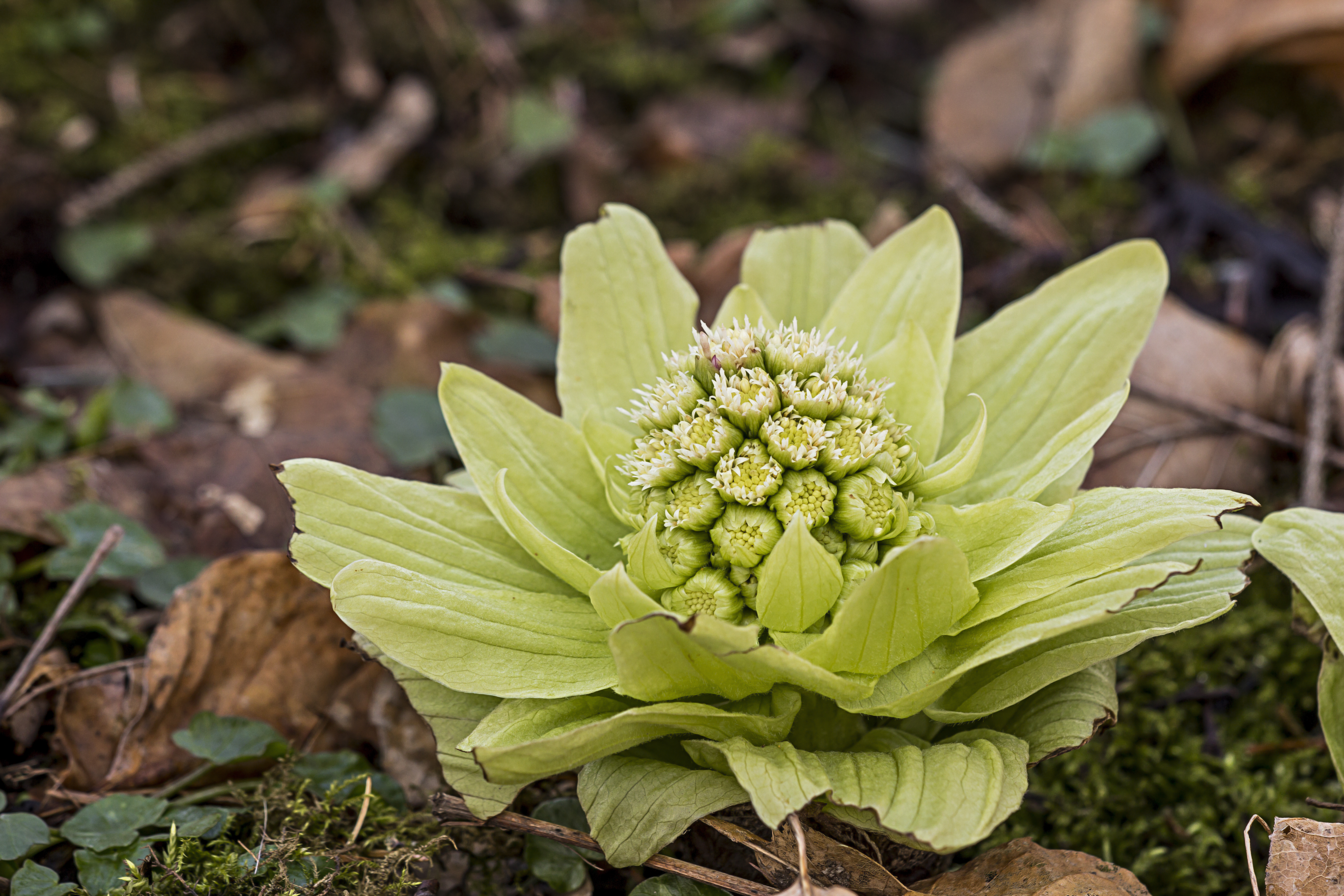
- Fuki shoot

Scientific classification
- Kingdom: Plantae
- Clade: Embryophytes
- Clade: Tracheophytes
- Clade: Angiosperms
- Clade: Eudicots
- Clade: Asterids
- Order: Asterales
- Family: Asteraceae
- Genus: Petasites
- Species: P. japonicus

Binomial name
- Petasites japonicus (Siebold & Zucc.) Maxim.

= Petasites japonicus =

Giant butterbur

Species of flowering plant in the daisy family

Butterbur (fuki), raw
Nutritional value per 100 g (3.5 oz)
- Energy: 59 kJ (14 kcal)
- Carbohydrates: 3.61 g
- Fat: 0.04 g
- Protein: 0.39 g
Vitamins and minerals
Vitamins	Quantity %DV^{†}
Thiamine (B1)	2% 0.02 mg
Riboflavin (B2)	2% 0.02 mg
Niacin (B3)	1% 0.2 mg
Pantothenic acid (B5)	1% 0.032 mg
Vitamin B6	6% 0.096 mg
Folate (B9)	3% 10 μg
Vitamin C	35% 31.5 mg
Minerals	Quantity %DV^{†}
Calcium	8% 103 mg
Iron	1% 0.1 mg
Magnesium	3% 13 mg
Manganese	12% 0.274 mg
Phosphorus	1% 12 mg
Potassium	22% 655 mg
Sodium	0% 7 mg
Zinc	1% 0.16 mg
- Link to USDA Database entry
- ^{†}Percentages estimated using US recommendations for adults, except for potassium, which is estimated based on expert recommendation from the National Academies.

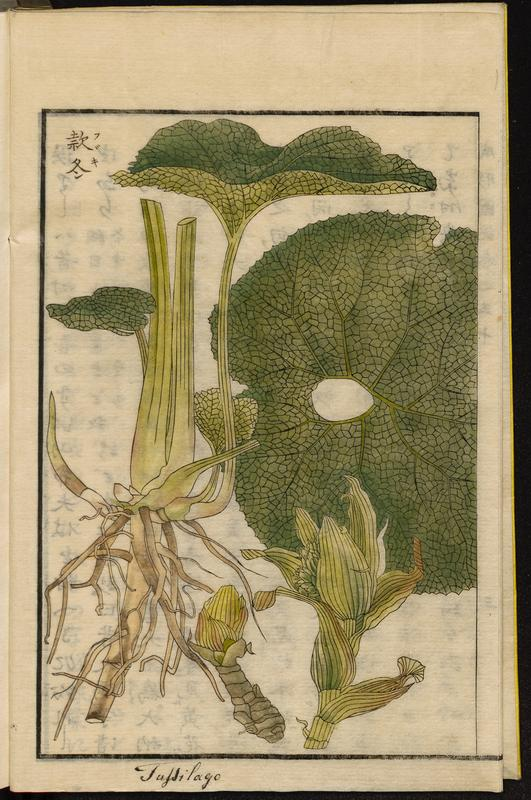
Petasites japonicus, illustration from the Japanese agricultural encyclopedia Seikei Zusetsu (1804)

Petasites japonicus, also known as butterbur, giant butterbur, great butterbur, fuki and sweet-coltsfoot, is an herbaceous perennial plant in the family Asteraceae. It is native to China, Japan, Korea and Sakhalin and introduced in Europe and North America. It was introduced to southern British Columbia in Canada by Japanese migrants.

It is dioecious, with male and female flowers produced on separate individuals. Occasionally, morphologically hermaphroditic (but functionally sterile) flowers exist.

== Culinary usage ==
The traditional preparation method for this vegetable involves pre-treating with ash or baking soda and soaking in water to remove harshness (astringency), which is a technique known as aku-nuki (灰汁抜き; literally "harshness removal"). The shoot can be chopped and stir fried with miso to make fuki-miso which is eaten as a relish thinly spread over hot rice at meals. The bulb-like shoots are also picked fresh and fried as tempura. In Korea, it is steamed or boiled and then pressed to remove water. Sesame oil or perilla oil is added in order to make namul.

== Toxicity ==
Like other Petasites species, fuki contains pyrrolizidine alkaloids (PAs) which have been associated with cumulative damage to the liver and tumor formation. It also contains the carcinogenic PA petasitenine. The concentration of hepatotoxic PAs can be reduced to a concentration below detection limits with a proper extraction process. Since many alkaloids are bitter, traditional methods of preparation may have evolved to remove them.

== Animal studies ==
Certain extracts of Petasites japonicus have found to be anti-inflammatory in a study of asthma in mice. Additional studies in mice suggest the plant may contain blood plasma and hepatic lipid-lowering and antioxidant compounds.

== Folklore ==
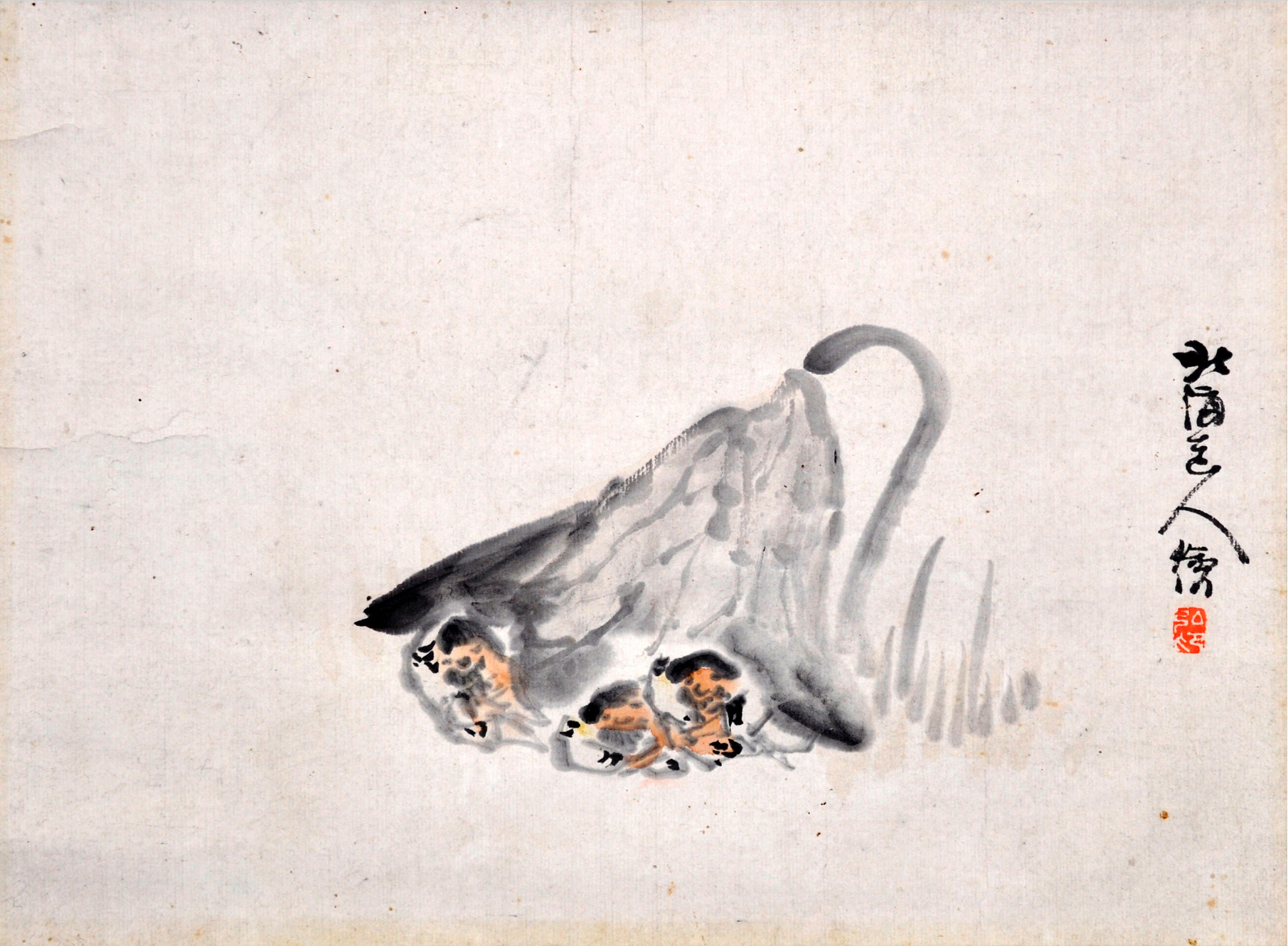
"Koroppokuru Beneath a Butterbur" by Matsuura Takeshiro (Hakodate City Museum)

The Ainu people refer to the previous inhabitants of Ezo as the Korpokkur or "people who dwelt below ground"; the name can also be interpreted as "people beneath the fuki", and so they are popularly associated with fuki leaves in art and mythology. More fantastic depictions of the Korpokkur portray them as tiny, fairy-like creatures small enough to use the leaves as roofs or umbrellas.
