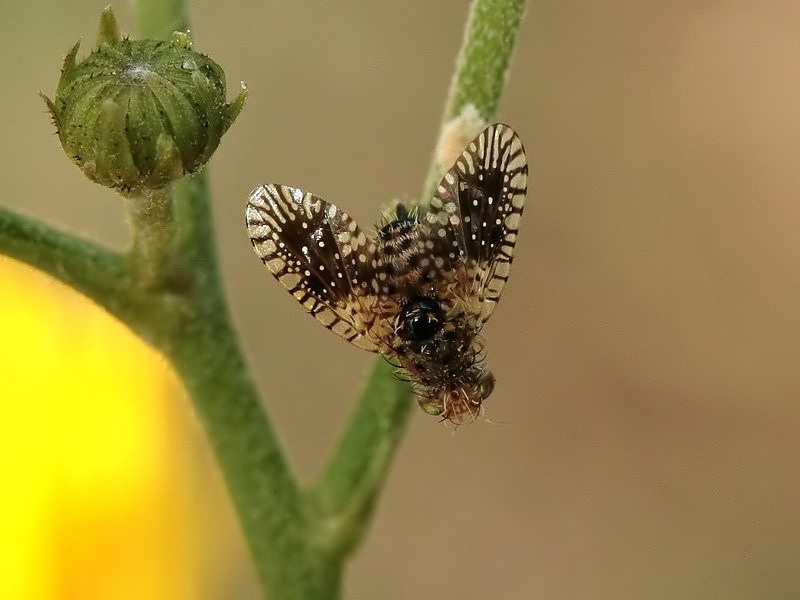
- Noeeta pupillata

Scientific classification
- Domain: Eukaryota
- Kingdom: Animalia
- Phylum: Arthropoda
- Class: Insecta
- Order: Diptera
- Family: Tephritidae
- Subfamily: Tephritinae
- Tribe: Noeetini
- Genus: Noeeta; Robineau-Desvoidy, 1830

Type species
- Noeeta flavipes Robineau-Desvoidy, 1830

Synonyms
- Oplocheta Rondani, 1856; Carphotricha Loew, 1862; Hoplocheta Rondani, 1870; Carpotricha Rondani, 1870; Hoplogaster Hendel, 1914; Pseudonoeeta Hering, 1942; Noeta Persson, 1958

= Noeeta =

Genus of flies

Noeeta is a genus of tephritid or fruit flies in the family Tephritidae.

== Species ==
- Noeeta alini (Hering, 1951)
- Noeeta bisetosa Merz, 1992
- Noeeta crepidis Hering, 1936
- Noeeta hemiradiata Dirlbek & Dirlbek, 1991
- Noeeta pupillata (Fallén, 1814)
- Noeeta sinica Chen, 1938
- Noeeta strigilata (Loew, 1855)
