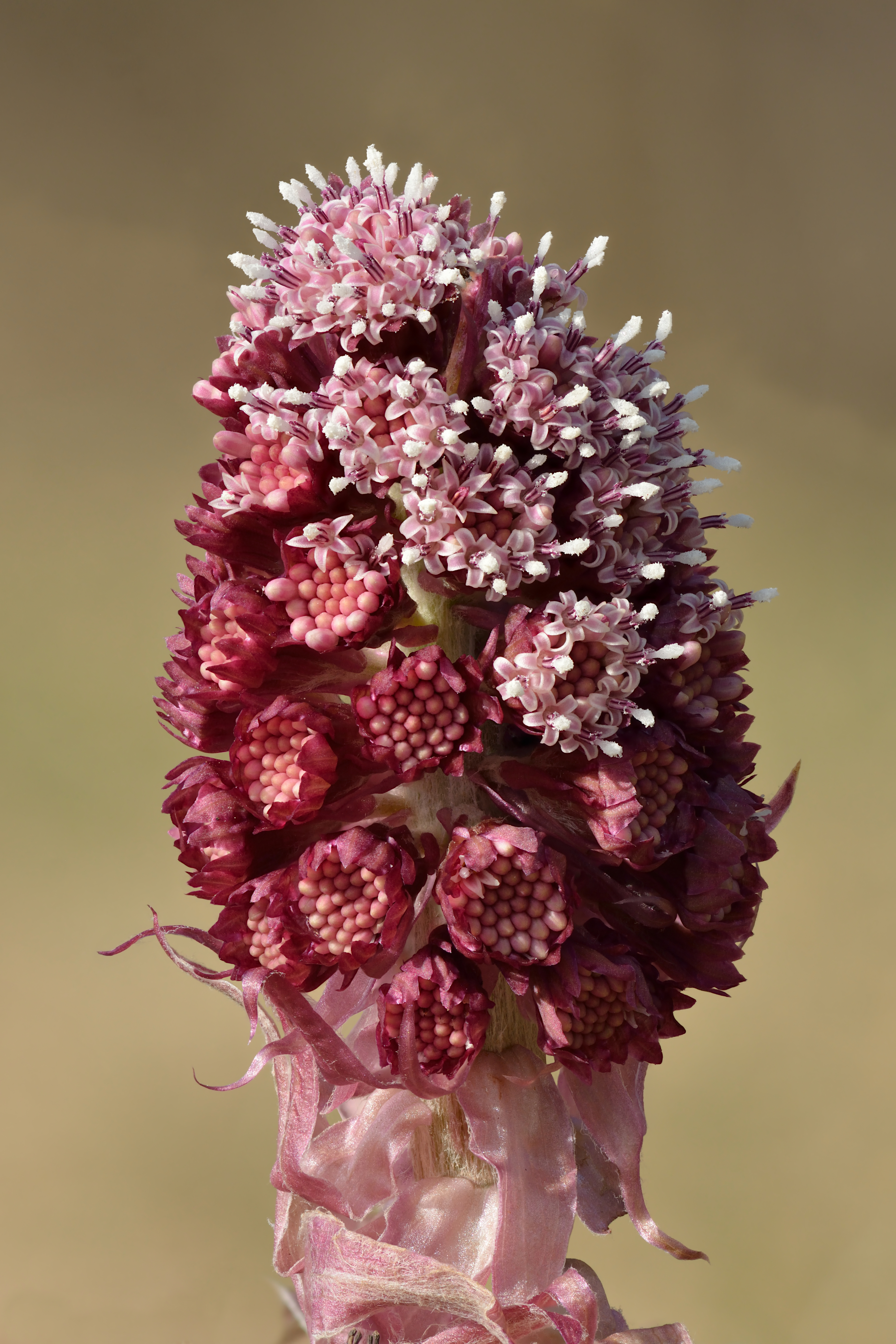
- Petasites hybridus

Scientific classification
- Kingdom: Plantae
- Clade: Tracheophytes
- Clade: Angiosperms
- Clade: Eudicots
- Clade: Asterids
- Order: Asterales
- Family: Asteraceae
- Subfamily: Asteroideae
- Tribe: Senecioneae
- Genus: Petasites; Mill.

Synonyms
- Nardosmia Cass.; Petasitis Mill.

= Petasites =

Genus of flowering plants in the daisy family

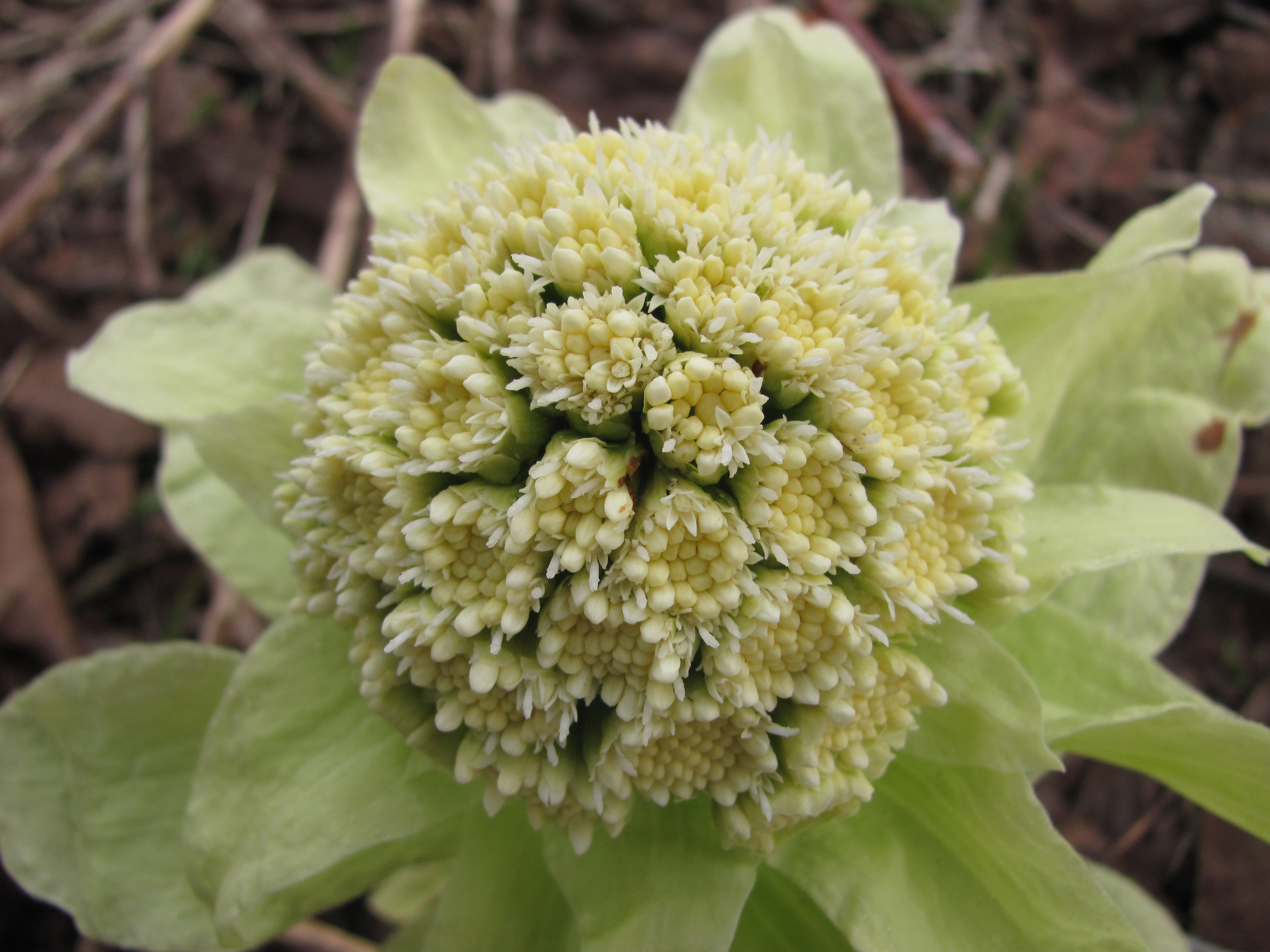
Petasites japonicus

Petasites is a genus of flowering plants in the sunflower family, Asteraceae, that are commonly referred to as butterburs and coltsfoots. They are perennial plants with thick, creeping underground rhizomes and large rhubarb-like leaves during the growing season. Most species are native to Asia or southern Europe.

== Taxonomy ==
The genus name is derived from the Greek word πέτασος petasos, from the plant's broad leaves resembling a wide-brimmed hat.

== Species ==
Accepted species

- Petasites albus – white butterbur – Europe, Algeria, Turkey, Caucasus, India
- Petasites fominii – Republic of Georgia
- Petasites formosanus – Taiwan
- Petasites frigidus – Arctic butterbur or Arctic sweet coltsfoot – Scandinavia, Mongolia, Canada, northern USA
- Petasites hybridus – common butterbur – Europe, Mediterranean
- Petasites japonicus – giant butterbur, fuki – China, Japan, Korea
- Petasites kablikianus – southeastern Europe from Poland to Albania
- Petasites kamengicus – Arunachal Pradesh
- Petasites paradoxus – central + southwestern Europe from Spain to Poland
- Petasites pyrenaicus syn. Petasites fragrans - winter heliotrope - from Azores to Ireland + Tunisia
- Petasites radiatus – Mongolia
- Petasites rubellus – Mongolia, Manchuria, Korea
- Petasites sibiricus – Siberia
- Petasites spurius – Europe, Siberia, Caucasus, Central Asia
- Petasites tatewakianus – Siberia, Russian Far East, northeastern China
- Petasites tricholobus – China, Vietnam, Himalayas
- Petasites versipilus – Sichuan, Yunnan

Species of hybrid origin

- Petasites × vitifolius

Species formerly included

Petasites glacialis (Ledeb.) Polunin - Endocellion glaciale (Ledeb.) Toman

== Characteristics ==
The short spikes of flowers are produced just before the leaves in late winter (e.g. Petasites fragrans) or spring, emerging with only a few elongated basal bracts and are usually green, flesh coloured or dull white depending on the species. It is dioecious, with male and female flowers borne on separate plants.

Butterbur can be found in parts of Asia such as Korea, China, and Japan, as well as Europe and North America. They prefer moist environments such as riverbanks, marshes and ditches.

Petasites is closely related to the genera Tussilago and Senecio.

== Medicinal uses ==
Butterbur has been used for over 2000 years to treat a variety of ailments including fever, lung disease, spasms, and pain. Currently, butterbur extract is used for migraine prevention and treatment of allergic rhinitis, which have the most evidence for its effectiveness.

=== Migraine ===
Some butterbur species contain the chemicals petasin and isopetasin which are believed to have potential benefits in treating migraines. High concentrations of petasin occur in both butterbur root and leaves, with the leaves containing lower levels of the toxic chemical. Butterbur extracts have been reported to be effective in reducing frequency and severity of migraine headaches. Several double-blind studies have shown that high doses of Petasites hybridus extract, containing petasin and/or isopetasin, are effective both in preventing and in relieving migraine, with the best results in groups taking the higher dose of the supplement. Although mainly well tolerated, the adverse effects of butterbur reported in clinical trials include mainly gastrointestinal problems, such as nausea, flatulence, and belching. In 2015, the American Academy of Neurology withdrew its original endorsement of butterbur due to safety concerns. However, the Canadian Headache Society still recommends its use in migraine prevention for a selected number of patients based on their clinical features and co-existing disorders.

=== Hay fever or allergic rhinitis ===
Additionally, a study showed butterbur extract to be an effective treatment for hay fever without the sedative effect of the antihistamine cetirizine, if taken four times daily. Butterbur was also shown to be comparably effective as fexofenadine when compared to placebo for reducing symptoms of allergic rhinitis.

== Risks ==
Butterbur extracts may contain harmful components called pyrrolizidine alkaloids if the preparations are not carefully and fully purified. The concentration of the toxic alkaloids is often highest in the rhizomes and lowest in the leaves, and may vary depending on where the plants are grown. These chemicals are toxic to the liver and may cause cancers. Thus, due to the potential for contamination, taking butterbur supplements is not recommended during pregnancy or breastfeeding. Some sources say it is safe practice to consume butterbur extract that has been prepared by a reputable laboratory. Other sources say no butterbur product is safe: "The cases of liver toxicity appear to have occurred with extracts of butterbur where the pyrrolizidine alkaloids had been removed and only small amounts remained. There is some evidence that other constituents found in butterbur such as the sesquiterpene constituents for example petasin may be implicated in the liver toxicity".

Long-term health effects and interaction of butterbur with other drugs have not been well documented. However, it can theoretically interact with certain blood pressure and heart medications, as well as with drugs that can induce a liver enzyme called CYP3A4 (i.e. St. John's wort, carbamazepine, phenytoin, rifampin); this interaction can potentially lead to increased concentration of the toxic alkaloids.
