= Petasin =

Names
- IUPAC name 8-Oxo-7α-eremophila-9,11-dien-3α-yl (2Z)-2-methylbut-2-enoate
- Systematic IUPAC name (1R,2R,7S,8aR)-1,8a-Dimethyl-6-oxo-7-(prop-1-en-2-yl)-1,2,3,4,6,7,8,8a-octahydronaphthalen-2-yl (2Z)-2-methylbut-2-enoate
- Other names Petasol butenoate; O-Angeloylsencathenone

Identifiers
CAS Number	26577-85-5
3D model (JSmol)	Interactive image
ChEBI	CHEBI:8030
ChemSpider	4444859
PubChem CID	5281526
UNII	9Z0Q32J0QC
- InChI: InChI=1S/C20H28O3/c1-7-13(4)19(22)23-18-9-8-15-10-17(21)16(12(2)3)11-20(15,6)14(18)5/h7,10,14,16,18H,2,8-9,11H2,1,3-6H3/b13-7-/t14-,16-,18+,20+/m0/s1 Key: ISTBXSFGFOYLTM-NZEDGPFZSA-N; InChI=1/C20H28O3/c1-7-13(4)19(22)23-18-9-8-15-10-17(21)16(12(2)3)11-20(15,6)14(18)5/h7,10,14,16,18H,2,8-9,11H2,1,3-6H3/b13-7-/t14-,16-,18+,20+/m0/s1 Key: ISTBXSFGFOYLTM-NZEDGPFZBZ
- SMILES: O=C2/C=C1/CC[C@@H](OC(=O)\C(=C/C)C)[C@@H]([C@]1(C[C@H]2\C(=C)C)C)C

Properties
Chemical formula	C_{20}H_{28}O_{3}
Molar mass	316.441 g·mol^{−1}
- Except where otherwise noted, data are given for materials in their standard state (at 25 °C [77 °F], 100 kPa). Infobox references

Petasin is a natural chemical compound found in plants of the genus Petasites. Chemically, it is classified as a sesquiterpene and is the ester of petasol and angelic acid.

Petasin is believed to be responsible, at least in part, for the anti-inflammatory effects of common butterbur (Petasites hybridus) extracts.

A 2021 study reported that petasin can inhibit tumor growth and metastasis in an animal model of cancer.
