= Acidogona =

Scientific classification
- Domain: Eukaryota
- Kingdom: Animalia
- Phylum: Arthropoda
- Class: Insecta
- Order: Diptera
- Family: Tephritidae
- Subfamily: Tephritinae
- Tribe: Noeetini
- Genus: Acidogona; Loew, 1873

Type species
- Trypeta melanura Loew, 1873

Synonyms
- Acidigona Loew, 1873; Xenochaeta Snow, 1894

Genus of flies

Acidogona is a genus of tephritid or fruit flies in the family Tephritidae.

== Species ==
- Acidogona dichromata (Snow, 1894)
- Acidogona melanura (Loew, 1873)
- Acidogona pendula Norrbom, 2010
- Acidogona stecki Norrbom, 2010
