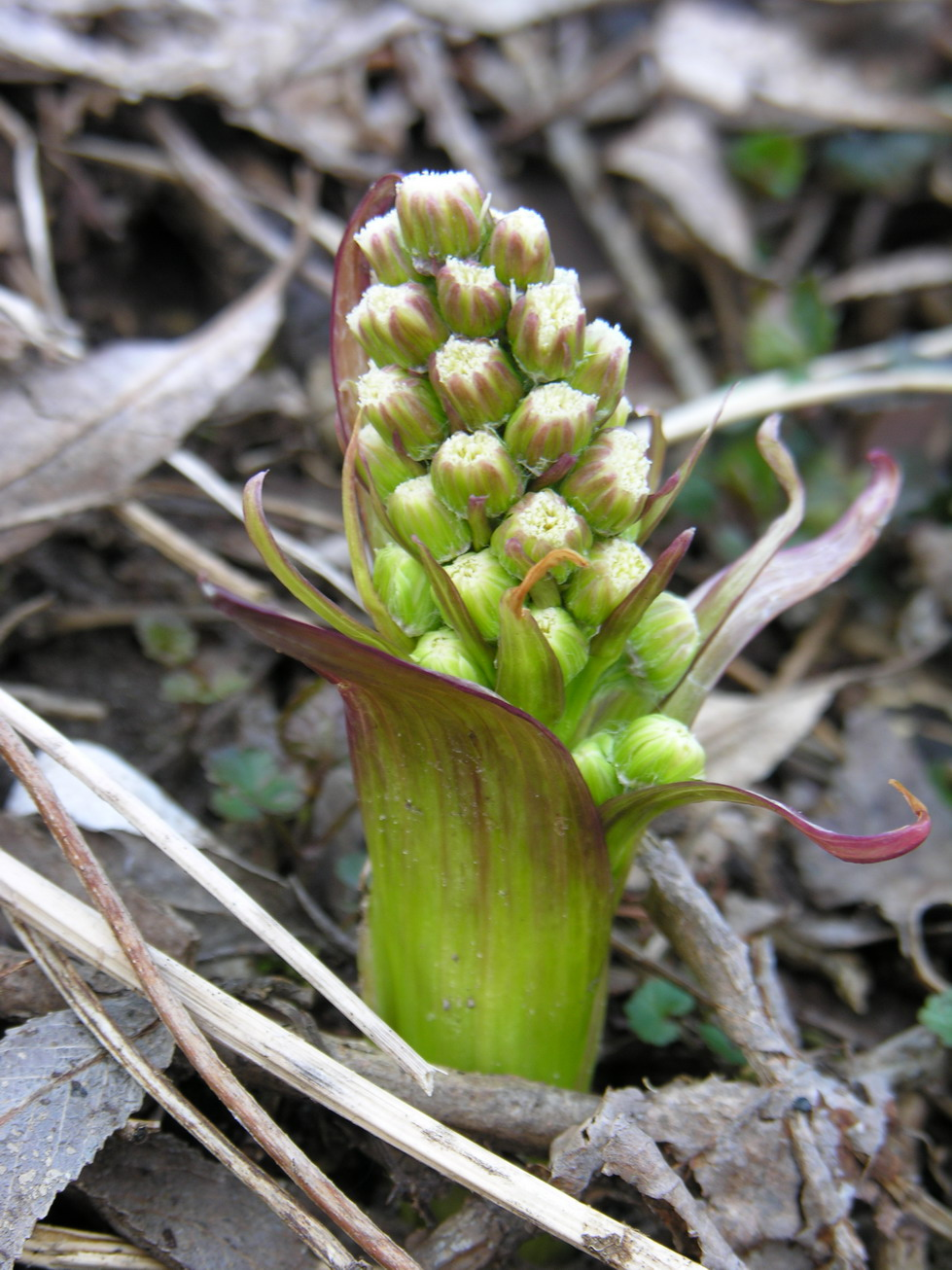

Scientific classification
- Kingdom: Plantae
- Clade: Embryophytes
- Clade: Tracheophytes
- Clade: Angiosperms
- Clade: Eudicots
- Clade: Asterids
- Order: Asterales
- Family: Asteraceae
- Genus: Petasites
- Species: P. spurius

Binomial name
- Petasites spurius Rchb.f.

= Petasites spurius =

Species of flowering plant in the daisy family

Petasites spurius is a species of flowering plant in the family Asteraceae.

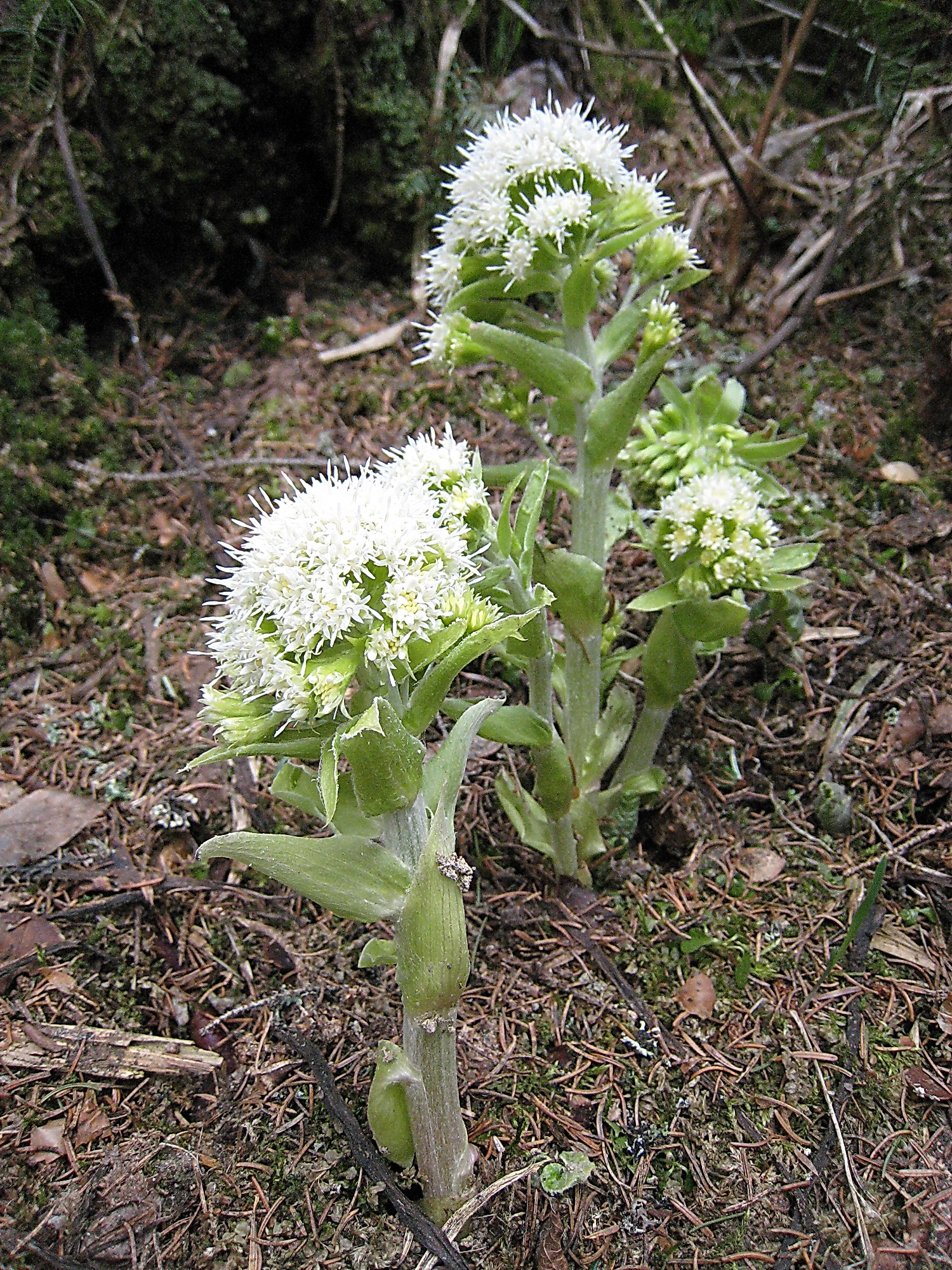
Pelastus spurius, Rila, Bulgaria
