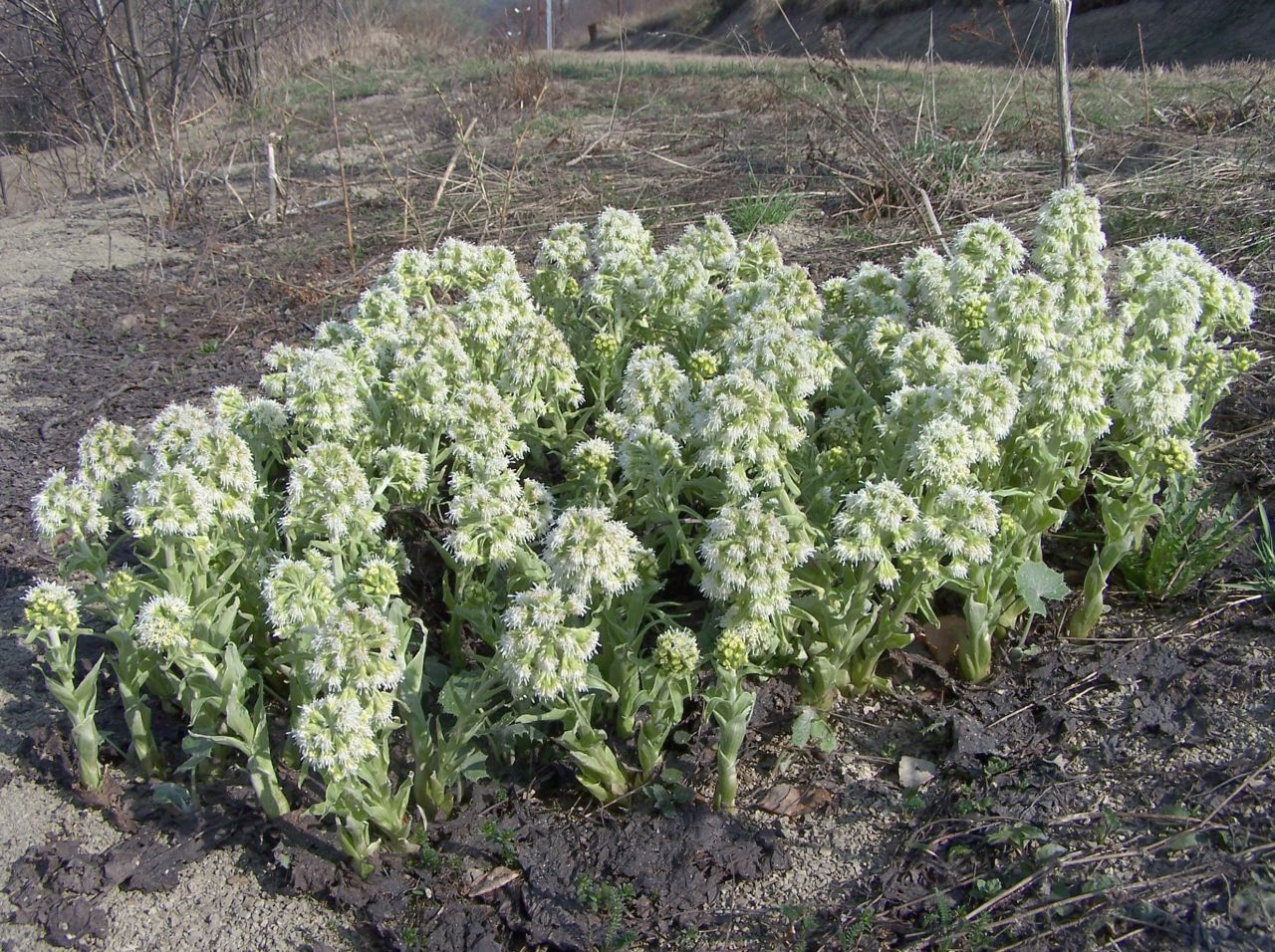

Scientific classification
- Kingdom: Plantae
- Clade: Embryophytes
- Clade: Tracheophytes
- Clade: Angiosperms
- Clade: Eudicots
- Clade: Asterids
- Order: Asterales
- Family: Asteraceae
- Genus: Petasites
- Species: P. albus

Binomial name
- Petasites albus (L.) Gaertn.

= Petasites albus =

Species of flowering plant in the daisy family

Petasites albus, the white butterbur, is a flowering plant species in the family Asteraceae. It is native to central Europe and the Caucasus.

== Description ==
Petasites albus is a perennial rhizomatous herb, with large suborbicular (almost round) leaves covered with lax cottony hairs. The flower heads are compact racemes of composite flowers or capitula with white ligules. They are dioecious, the male plants often more common than the females, as in the British range.

== Distribution ==
The native range of Petasites albus is the mountains of central Europe and the Caucasus. It was first recorded in Sweden in Skåne in 1737 (Nordstedt 1920). In the British Isles it is a neophyte, introduced by the 17th century and naturalized in Yorkshire by 1843, but now predominantly distributed in North-east Scotland.

== Habitat ==
It prefers damp soils in deciduous forests, mountain pastures, springs and streamsides, roadside verges and other areas of rough ground.

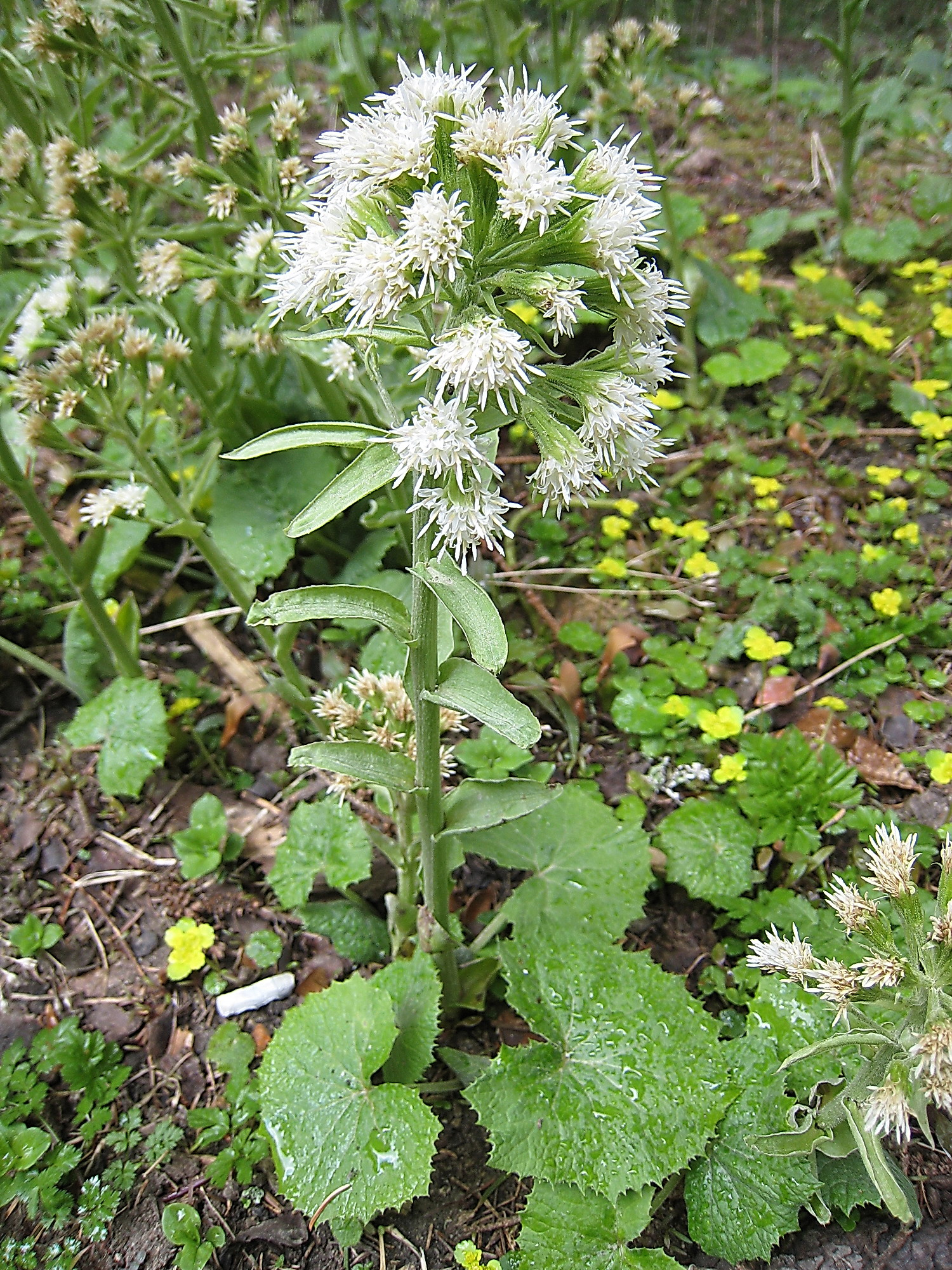
White butterbur (Petasites albus)
