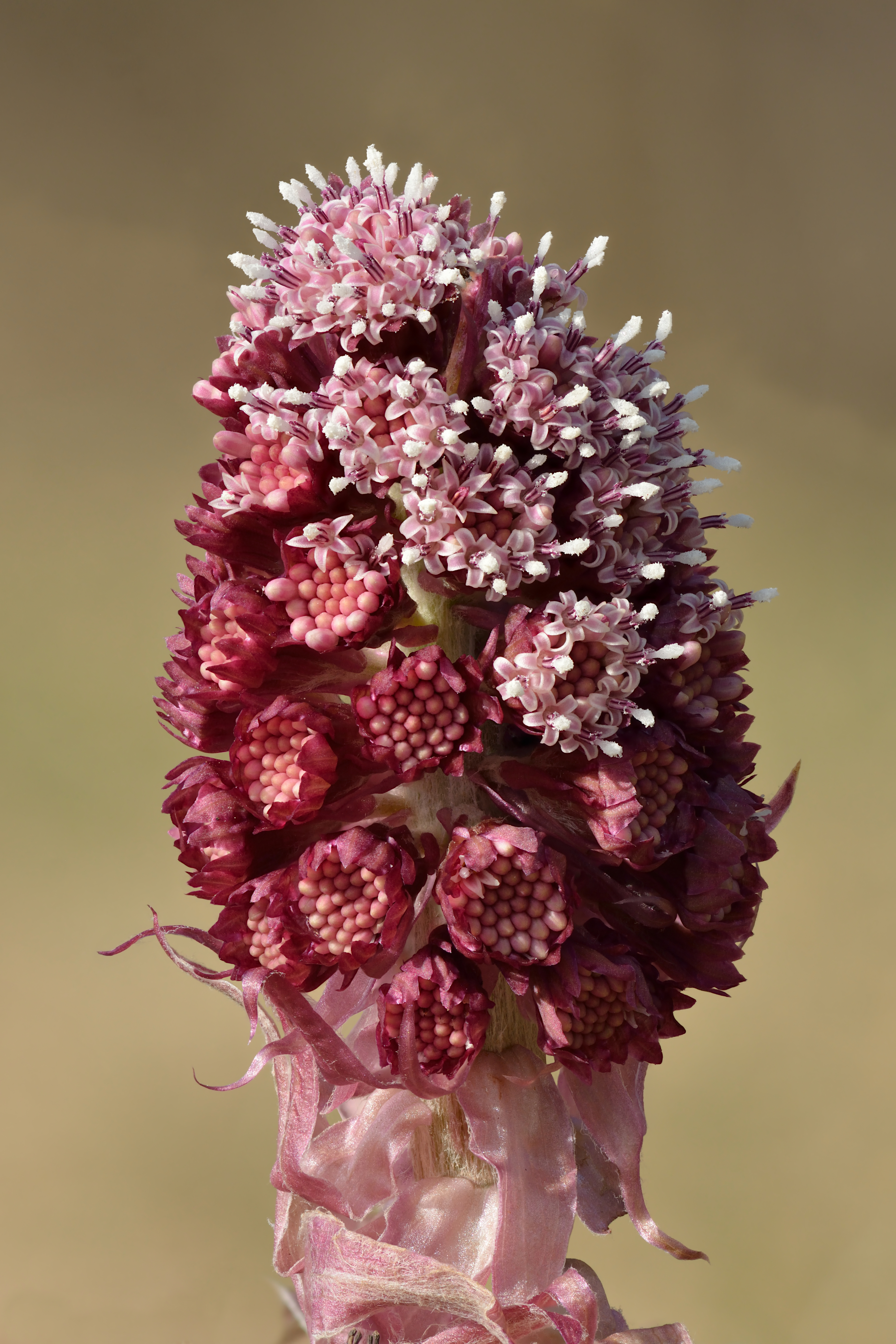
- Inflorescence
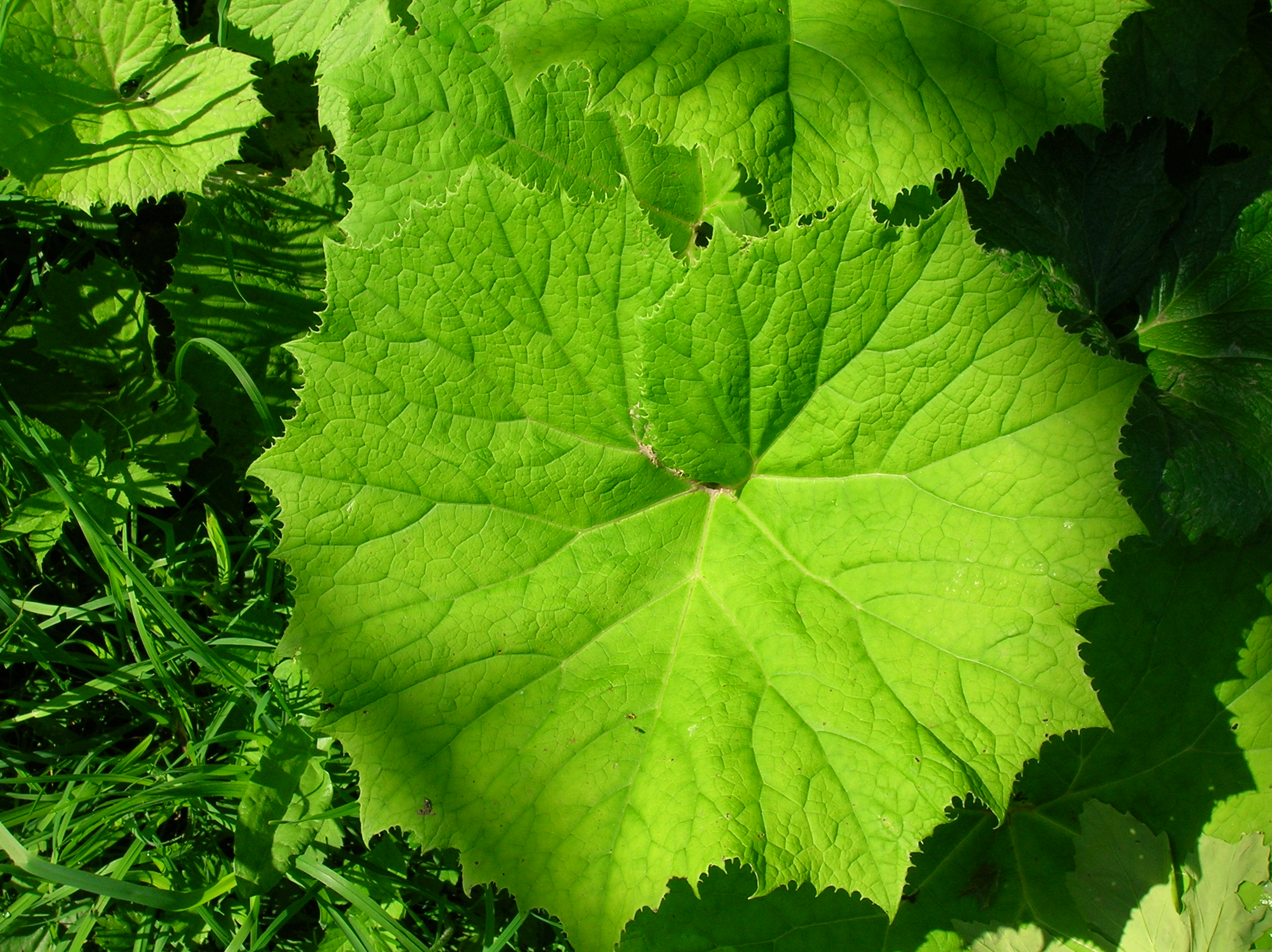
- Foliage

Scientific classification
- Kingdom: Plantae
- Clade: Embryophytes
- Clade: Tracheophytes
- Clade: Angiosperms
- Clade: Eudicots
- Clade: Asterids
- Order: Asterales
- Family: Asteraceae
- Tribe: Senecioneae
- Genus: Petasites
- Species: P. hybridus

Binomial name
- Petasites hybridus (L.) G.Gaertn., B.Mey. & Scherb.

Synonyms
- Cineraria hybrida (L.) Bernh.; Tussilago hybrida L.; Tussilago petasites L.; Petasites officinalis L.; Petasites ovatus L.; Petasites vulgaris Desf.

= Petasites hybridus =

Species of flowering plant in the daisy family

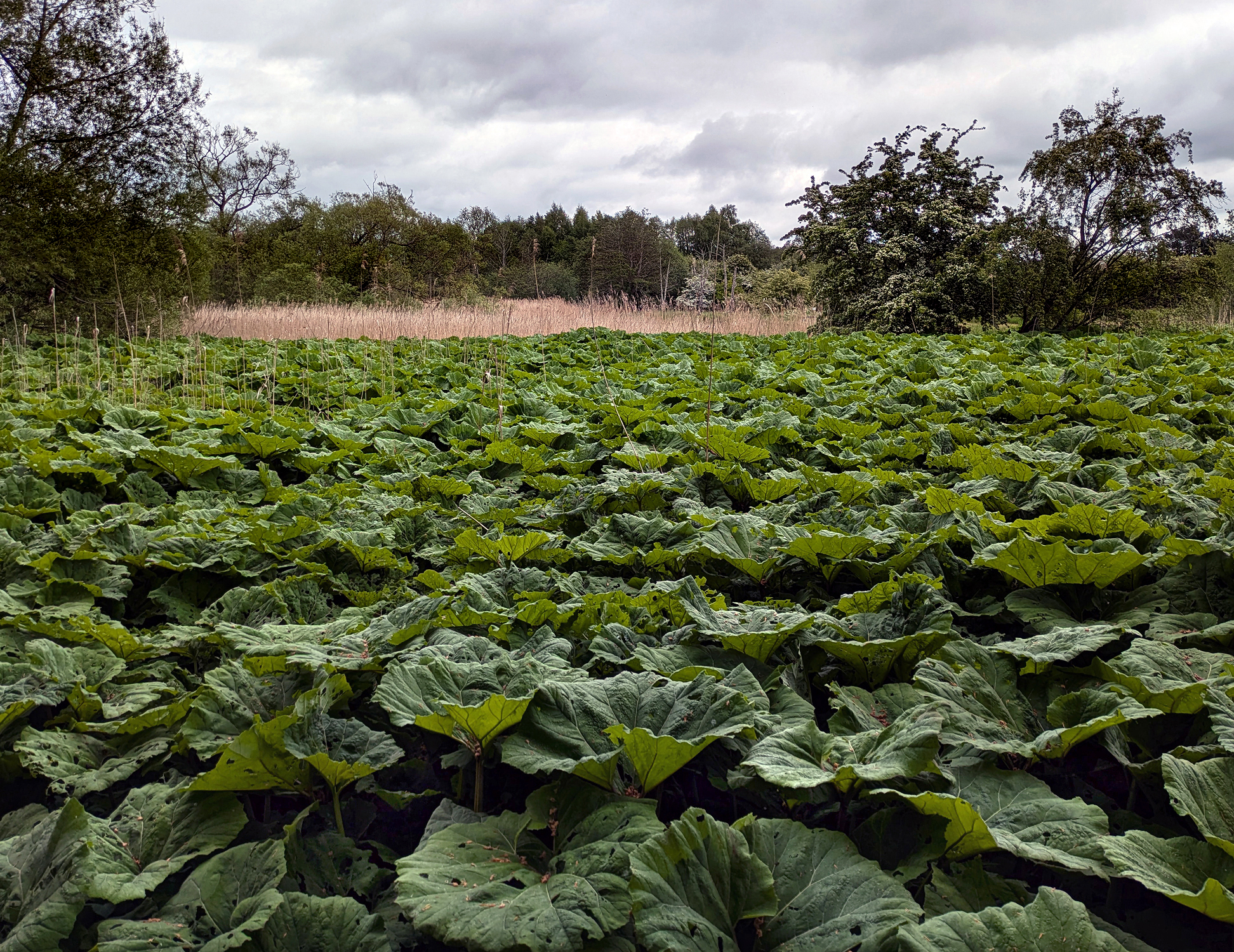
Butterbur in Ystad

Petasites hybridus, also known as the butterbur, is a herbaceous perennial flowering plant in the family Asteraceae that is native to Europe and northern Asia. Although used over centuries in traditional medicine to treat various disorders, there are no approved medical uses, but it is sold as a dietary supplement. Concerns about the potential toxic effects of pyrrolizidine alkaloids in butterbur limit its use in human and animal studies.

== Common names ==
Butterbur may have derived from the use of leaves to wrap butter centuries ago. It is also called bog rhubarb, Devil's hat, and pestilence wort.

== Description ==
The species is dioecious, the male and female flowers being borne on separate plants. In Britain, the male flowers are widespread, but the female flowers have a restricted distribution in northern and central England.

The flowers are produced in the early spring, before the leaves appear. They are pale pink, with several inflorescences clustered on a 5–20 cm (2–8 in) stem. The leaves are large, on stout 80–120 cm (31–47 in) tall stems, round, with a diameter of 40–70 cm (16–28 in) with petioles up to 1.5 m (4 ft 11 in).

== Distribution ==
It is native to western and central Europe, extending from the British Isles to the Caucasus, and from southern Italy to southern Scandinavia. It is present as an introduced species in North America. In the British Isles, female plants are rarely found outside central and northern England and the species may be naturalized as clonal populations outside this area, propagating via rhizome fragments. The preferred habitats are moist, fertile soils often by rivers, streams, and in wet meadows.

== Dietary supplement and research ==
As there are no approved clinical uses of butterbur or its extracts, preparations are sold in some countries as a dietary supplement. There is no evidence that butterbur is useful for treating skin allergies, bronchitis, urinary tract infections, asthma, or other disorders.

=== Migraines ===
Although some preliminary studies indicate that butterbur may reduce the frequency of migraine headaches in adults and children, clinical neurology associations do not recommend it because of concerns of possible liver toxicity.

=== Rhinitis ===
Although there have been studies of butterbur root or leaf extracts as possible therapies for symptoms of hay fever (allergic rhinitis), the results were insufficient to determine effectiveness and safety.

=== Traditional medicine ===
Petasites hybridus leaves were used in Austrian and Czech traditional medicine internally (as tea or cold maceration in ethanol) and externally (as compresses or maceration in vinegar) for treatment of infections, fever, flu, colds, hay-fever, and allergies.

== Phytochemicals ==
Petasites hybridus contains senecionine and other toxic pyrrolizidine alkaloids in its leaves and roots. Also present are the sesquiterpene esters – petasin, isopetasin, and neopetasin.

Petasin's structure

== Potential toxicity ==
Butterbur extracts have been found to contain hepatotoxic pyrrolizidine alkaloids at the retail level. These extracts are not recommended during pregnancy or breastfeeding.

The adverse effects of butterbur reported in clinical trials include mainly gastrointestinal problems, such as nausea, flatulence, and belching. In 2015, the American Academy of Neurology withdrew its original endorsement of butterbur due to safety concerns.

Long-term health effects and interaction of butterbur with other drugs have not been well documented. However, it can theoretically interact with certain blood pressure and heart medications, as well as with drugs that can induce a liver enzyme called CYP3A4. Prior cases of liver damage have been reported from people taking butterbur, with cases varying in adverse effects from cholestasis and inflammation to liver failure.
