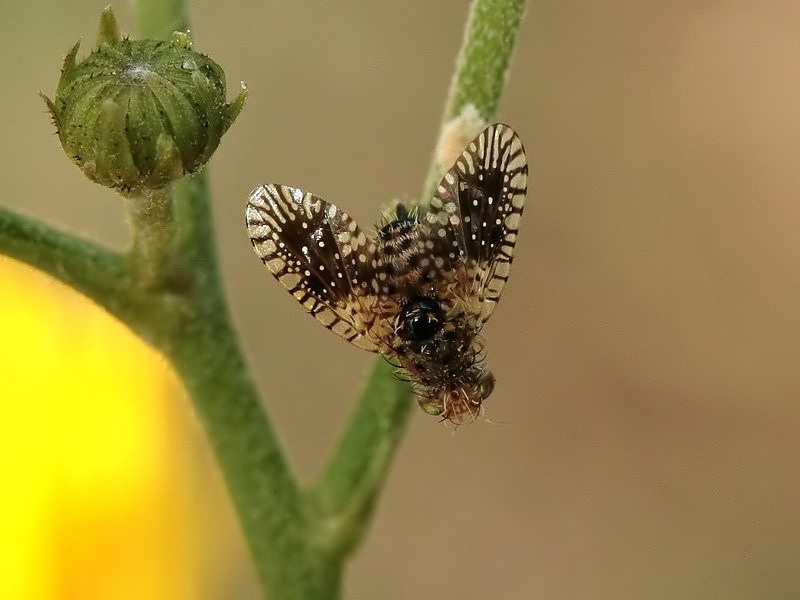
- Noeeta pupillata

Scientific classification
- Kingdom: Animalia
- Phylum: Arthropoda
- Class: Insecta
- Order: Diptera
- Family: Tephritidae
- Subfamily: Tephritinae
- Tribe: Noeetini

= Noeetini =

Tribe of flies

Noeetini is a tribe of tephritid or fruit flies in the family Tephritidae.

== Genera ==
- Acidogona Loew, 1873
- Ensina Robineau-Desvoidy, 1830
- Hypenidium Loew, 1862
- Jamesomyia Quisenberry, 1949
- Noeeta Robineau-Desvoidy, 1830
- Paracanthella Portschinsky, 1875
- Trigonochorium Becker, 1913
