= List of United Kingdom locations: As-Az =

The United Kingdom

This is part of the list of United Kingdom locations: a gazetteer of place names in the United Kingdom showing each place's locality and geographical coordinates.

== As ==
=== Asb-Ash ===
Location	Locality	Coordinates (links to map & photo sources)	OS grid reference
Asby	Cumbria	54.56°N 03.45°W	NY0620
Ascog	Argyll and Bute	55.82°N 05.03°W	NS1063
Ascot	Berkshire	51.40°N 00.67°W	SU9268
Ascott	Warwickshire	52.00°N 01.53°W	SP3234
Ascott d'Oyley	Oxfordshire	51.86°N 01.56°W	SP3018
Ascott Earl	Oxfordshire	51.86°N 01.58°W	SP2918
Ascott-under-Wychwood	Oxfordshire	51.86°N 01.56°W	SP3018
Ascreavie	Angus	56.70°N 03.09°W	NO3357
Ascrib Islands	Highland	57.57°N 06.51°W	NG302631
Asenby	North Yorkshire	54.16°N 01.40°W	SE3975
Asfordby	Leicestershire	52.76°N 00.96°W	SK7019
Asfordby Hill	Leicestershire	52.76°N 00.93°W	SK7219
Asgarby (Sleaford)	Lincolnshire	52.99°N 00.34°W	TF1145
Asgarby (Spilsby)	Lincolnshire	53.17°N 00.01°W	TF3366
Ash	Devon	50.32°N 03.64°W	SX8349
Ash (near Bridport)	Dorset	50.76°N 02.76°W	SY4696
Ash (near Stourpaine)	Dorset	50.88°N 02.20°W	ST8610
Ash (Ash-cum-Ridley)	Kent	51.35°N 00.29°E	TQ6064
Ash (near Sandwich)	Kent	51.27°N 01.28°E	TR2958
Ash (near Taunton)	Somerset	50.99°N 03.02°W	ST2822
Ash (near Yeovil)	Somerset	50.97°N 02.75°W	ST4720
Ash	Surrey	51.25°N 00.72°W	SU8951
Ashaig	Highland	57.23°N 05.83°W	NG6923
Ashampstead	Berkshire	51.48°N 01.19°W	SU5676
Ashampstead Green	Berkshire	51.48°N 01.19°W	SU5677
Ashbank	Kent	51.24°N 00.60°E	TQ8253
Ash Bank	City of Stoke-on-Trent	53.01°N 02.10°W	SJ9346
Ashbeer	Somerset	51.10°N 03.31°W	ST0835
Ashbocking	Suffolk	52.14°N 01.15°E	TM1654
Ashbourne	Derbyshire	53.01°N 01.73°W	SK1846
Ashbrittle	Somerset	50.98°N 03.35°W	ST0521
Ashbrook	Shropshire	52.54°N 02.81°W	SO4594
Ashburnham Forge	East Sussex	50.91°N 00.38°E	TQ6816
Ashburton	Devon	50.51°N 03.76°W	SX7570
Ashbury	Devon	50.76°N 04.12°W	SX5098
Ashbury	Oxfordshire	51.56°N 01.62°W	SU2685
Ashby	North Lincolnshire	53.56°N 00.65°W	SE8908
Ashby by Partney	Lincolnshire	53.17°N 00.12°E	TF4266
Ashby cum Fenby	North East Lincolnshire	53.48°N 00.11°W	TA2500
Ashby de la Launde	Lincolnshire	53.08°N 00.43°W	TF0555
Ashby-de-la-Zouch	Leicestershire	52.74°N 01.48°W	SK3516
Ashby Folville	Leicestershire	52.70°N 00.96°W	SK7012
Ashby Hill	North East Lincolnshire	53.48°N 00.13°W	TA2400
Ashby Magna	Leicestershire	52.50°N 01.17°W	SP5690
Ashby Parva	Leicestershire	52.48°N 01.23°W	SP5288
Ashby Puerorum	Lincolnshire	53.22°N 00.02°W	TF3271
Ashby St Ledgers	Northamptonshire	52.30°N 01.16°W	SP5768
Ashby St Mary	Norfolk	52.56°N 01.42°E	TG3202
Ashchurch	Gloucestershire	51.99°N 02.11°W	SO9233
Ashcombe	Devon	50.60°N 03.54°W	SX9179
Ashcombe Park	North Somerset	51.35°N 02.96°W	ST3362
Ashcott	Somerset	51.12°N 02.81°W	ST4337
Ashcott Corner	Somerset	51.14°N 02.80°W	ST4439
Ashculme	Devon	50.91°N 03.22°W	ST1414
Ashdon	Essex	52.05°N 00.30°E	TL5842
Ashe	Hampshire	51.24°N 01.24°W	SU5350
Asheldham	Essex	51.67°N 00.84°E	TL9701
Ashen	Essex	52.04°N 00.53°E	TL7442
Ashendon	Buckinghamshire	51.82°N 00.98°W	SP7014
Asheridge	Buckinghamshire	51.72°N 00.65°W	SP9304
Ashey	Isle of Wight	50.69°N 01.19°W	SZ5789
Ashfield	Argyll and Bute	56.00°N 05.59°W	NR7685
Ashfield	Carmarthenshire	51.93°N 03.90°W	SN6928
Ashfield	Hampshire	50.96°N 01.48°W	SU3619
Ashfield	Herefordshire	51.90°N 02.59°W	SO5923
Ashfield	Shropshire	52.81°N 03.02°W	SJ3125
Ashfield	Stirling	56.20°N 03.96°W	NN7803
Ashfield	Suffolk	52.21°N 01.21°E	TM2062
Ashfield cum Thorpe	Suffolk	52.21°N 01.21°E	TM2062
Ashfield Green (near Stradbroke)	Suffolk	52.30°N 01.31°E	TM2673
Ashfield Green (near Wickhambrook)	Suffolk	52.16°N 00.57°E	TL7655
Ashfields	Shropshire	52.83°N 02.44°W	SJ7026
Ashfold Crossways	West Sussex	51.03°N 00.24°W	TQ2328
Ashfold Side	North Yorkshire	54.09°N 01.81°W	SE1266
Ashford (North Devon)	Devon	51.09°N 04.10°W	SS5335
Ashford (South Hams)	Devon	50.31°N 03.85°W	SX6848
Ashford	Kent	51.14°N 00.85°E	TR0042
Ashford	Powys	51.53°N 03.16°W	SO1221
Ashford	Surrey	51.42°N 00.47°W	TQ0671
Ashford Bowdler	Shropshire	52.32°N 02.72°W	SO5170
Ashford Carbonell	Shropshire	52.32°N 02.70°W	SO5270
Ashford Common	Surrey	51.41°N 00.44°W	TQ0870
Ashford Hill	Hampshire	51.35°N 01.21°W	SU5562
Ashford in the Water	Derbyshire	53.21°N 01.71°W	SK1969
Ashgate	Derbyshire	53.23°N 01.46°W	SK3671
Ashgill	South Lanarkshire	55.71°N 03.94°W	NS7849
Ash Green	Surrey	51.23°N 00.71°W	SU9049
Ash Green	Warwickshire	52.46°N 01.51°W	SP3385
Ashgrove	Bath and North East Somerset	51.31°N 02.43°W	ST7057
Ashgrove	Moray	57.64°N 03.30°W	NJ2262
Ash Grove	Wrexham	52.95°N 02.95°W	SJ3640
Ash Hill	Devon	50.54°N 03.53°W	SX9173
Ashiestiel	Scottish Borders	55.60°N 02.92°W	NT4235
Ashill	Cornwall	50.13°N 05.20°W	SW6141
Ashill	Devon	50.89°N 03.30°W	ST0811
Ashill	Norfolk	52.60°N 00.77°E	TF8804
Ashill	Somerset	50.94°N 02.96°W	ST3217
Ashingdon	Essex	51.60°N 00.68°E	TQ8693
Ashington	Northumberland	55.17°N 01.57°W	NZ2787
Ashington	Poole	50.78°N 02.00°W	SZ0098
Ashington	Somerset	50.98°N 02.62°W	ST5621
Ashington	West Sussex	50.93°N 00.39°W	TQ1316
Ashington End	Lincolnshire	53.16°N 00.27°E	TF5266
Ashkirk	Scottish Borders	55.48°N 02.84°W	NT4722
Ashlett	Hampshire	50.82°N 01.34°W	SU4603
Ashleworth	Gloucestershire	51.92°N 02.27°W	SO8125
Ashley	Cambridgeshire	52.22°N 00.47°E	TL6961
Ashley	Cheshire East	53.35°N 02.34°W	SJ7784
Ashley	Dorset	50.83°N 01.81°W	SU1304
Ashley	Gloucestershire	51.64°N 02.10°W	ST9394
Ashley (New Forest)	Hampshire	50.75°N 01.64°W	SZ2595
Ashley (Test Valley)	Hampshire	51.07°N 01.45°W	SU3831
Ashley	Kent	51.18°N 01.29°E	TR3048
Ashley	Northamptonshire	52.50°N 00.83°W	SP7990
Ashley	Staffordshire	52.92°N 02.35°W	SJ7636
Ashley	Wiltshire	51.41°N 02.27°W	ST8168
Ashley Clinton	Hampshire	50.73°N 01.63°W	SZ2693
Ashley Dale	Staffordshire	52.92°N 02.37°W	SJ7536
Ashley Down	City of Bristol	51.47°N 02.59°W	ST5975
Ashley Green	Buckinghamshire	51.73°N 00.59°W	SP9705
Ashley Heath	Cheshire East	53.36°N 02.36°W	SJ7685
Ashley Heath	Dorset	50.83°N 01.84°W	SU1104
Ashley Heath	Staffordshire	52.91°N 02.38°W	SJ7435
Ashley Moor	Herefordshire	52.29°N 02.77°W	SO4767
Ashley Park	Surrey	51.37°N 00.42°W	TQ1065
Ash Magna	Shropshire	52.94°N 02.64°W	SJ5739
Ashmanhaugh	Norfolk	52.73°N 01.42°E	TG3121
Ashmansworth	Hampshire	51.31°N 01.41°W	SU4157
Ashmansworthy	Devon	50.93°N 04.37°W	SS3318
Ashmead Green	Gloucestershire	51.68°N 02.34°W	ST7699
Ash Mill	Devon	50.99°N 03.73°W	SS7823
Ashmill	Devon	50.73°N 04.28°W	SX3995
Ash Moor	Devon	50.95°N 03.72°W	SS7919
Ashmore	Dorset	50.95°N 02.12°W	ST9117
Ashmore Green	Berkshire	51.41°N 01.28°W	SU5069
Ashmore Lake	Walsall	52.58°N 02.06°W	SO9699
Ashmore Park	Wolverhampton	52.60°N 02.06°W	SJ9601
Ashopton	Derbyshire	53.37°N 01.71°W	SK1986
Ashorne	Warwickshire	52.21°N 01.56°W	SP3057
Ashover	Derbyshire	53.16°N 01.49°W	SK3463
Ashover Hay	Derbyshire	53.14°N 01.47°W	SK3561
Ashow	Warwickshire	52.32°N 01.54°W	SP3170
Ash Parva	Shropshire	52.94°N 02.64°W	SJ5739
Ashperton	Herefordshire	52.06°N 02.52°W	SO6441
Ashprington	Devon	50.40°N 03.67°W	SX8157
Ash Priors	Somerset	51.05°N 03.21°W	ST1529
Ashreigney	Devon	50.90°N 03.96°W	SS6213
Ashridge Court	Devon	50.81°N 03.90°W	SS6603
Ash Street	Suffolk	52.07°N 00.93°E	TM0146
Ashtead	Surrey	51.30°N 00.30°W	TQ1858
Ash Thomas	Devon	50.88°N 03.42°W	ST0010
Ashton	Cambridgeshire	52.63°N 00.37°W	TF1005
Ashton	Cornwall	50.10°N 05.35°W	SW6028
Ashton	Hampshire	50.96°N 01.23°W	SU5419
Ashton	Herefordshire	52.27°N 02.71°W	SO5164
Ashton	Inverclyde	55.95°N 04.83°W	NS2377
Ashton (near Northampton)	Northamptonshire	52.13°N 00.89°W	SP7649
Ashton (near Oundle)	Northamptonshire	52.48°N 00.45°W	TL0588
Ashton	Somerset	51.23°N 02.84°W	ST4149
Ashton Common	Wiltshire	51.32°N 02.15°W	ST8958
Ashton Gate	City of Bristol	51.43°N 02.62°W	ST5771
Ashton Green	East Sussex	50.88°N 00.07°E	TQ4612
Ashton Hayes	Cheshire West and Chester	53.21°N 02.75°W	SJ5069
Ashton-in-Makerfield	Wigan	53.48°N 02.64°W	SJ5799
Ashton Keynes	Wiltshire	51.64°N 01.94°W	SU0494
Ashton under Hill	Worcestershire	52.04°N 02.01°W	SO9938
Ashton-under-Lyne	Tameside	53.48°N 02.09°W	SJ9499
Ashton upon Mersey	Trafford	53.42°N 02.33°W	SJ7892
Ashton Vale	City of Bristol	51.42°N 02.63°W	ST5670
Ashurst	Hampshire	50.88°N 01.53°W	SU3310
Ashurst	Kent	51.12°N 00.15°E	TQ5138
Ashurst	Lancashire	53.55°N 02.78°W	SD4807
Ashurst	West Sussex	50.93°N 00.33°W	TQ1716
Ashurst Bridge	Hampshire	50.90°N 01.51°W	SU3412
Ashurst Wood	East Sussex	51.10°N 00.01°E	TQ4136
Ashvale	Blaenau Gwent	51.78°N 03.26°W	SO1310
Ash Vale	Surrey	51.26°N 00.72°W	SU8953
Ashwater	Devon	50.73°N 04.29°W	SX3895
Ashwell	Devon	50.55°N 03.56°W	SX8974
Ashwell	Hertfordshire	52.03°N 00.16°W	TL2639
Ashwell	Rutland	52.70°N 00.72°W	SK8613
Ashwell	Somerset	50.93°N 02.91°W	ST3615
Ashwell End	Hertfordshire	52.04°N 00.17°W	TL2540
Ashwellthorpe	Norfolk	52.52°N 01.15°E	TM1497
Ashwick	Somerset	51.23°N 02.53°W	ST6348
Ashwicken	Norfolk	52.74°N 00.51°E	TF7019
Ashwood	Staffordshire	52.49°N 02.20°W	SO8688

=== Ask-Asw ===
Location	Locality	Coordinates (links to map & photo sources)	OS grid reference
Askam in Furness	Cumbria	54.18°N 03.21°W	SD2177
Askern	Doncaster	53.61°N 01.17°W	SE5513
Askerswell	Dorset	50.72°N 02.68°W	SY5292
Askerton Hill	Nottinghamshire	53.00°N 00.80°W	SK8046
Askett	Buckinghamshire	51.73°N 00.82°W	SP8105
Askham	Cumbria	54.60°N 02.76°W	NY5123
Askham	Nottinghamshire	53.25°N 00.89°W	SK7474
Askham Bryan	York	53.92°N 01.16°W	SE5548
Askham Richard	York	53.92°N 01.19°W	SE5348
Asknish	Argyll and Bute	56.06°N 05.32°W	NR9391
Askomill	Argyll and Bute	55.42°N 05.60°W	NR7220
Askrigg	North Yorkshire	54.31°N 02.09°W	SD9491
Askwith	North Yorkshire	53.92°N 01.75°W	SE1648
Aslackby	Lincolnshire	52.85°N 00.39°W	TF0830
Aslacton	Norfolk	52.46°N 01.16°E	TM1590
Aslockton	Nottinghamshire	52.95°N 00.89°W	SK7440
Asney	Somerset	51.12°N 02.77°W	ST4636
Aspall	Suffolk	52.24°N 01.17°E	TM1765
Aspatria	Cumbria	54.75°N 03.33°W	NY1441
Aspenden	Hertfordshire	51.93°N 00.03°W	TL3528
Asperton	Lincolnshire	52.91°N 00.12°W	TF2637
Aspley	Nottinghamshire	52.97°N 01.21°W	SK5342
Aspley	Staffordshire	52.89°N 02.28°W	SJ8133
Aspley Guise	Bedfordshire	52.01°N 00.63°W	SP9436
Aspley Heath	Bedfordshire	52.00°N 00.66°W	SP9235
Aspley Heath	Warwickshire	52.32°N 01.86°W	SP0970
Aspull	Wigan	53.56°N 02.59°W	SD6108
Aspull Common	Wigan	53.47°N 02.55°W	SJ6398
Assater	Shetland Islands	60.49°N 01.47°W	HU2979
Asselby	East Riding of Yorkshire	53.74°N 00.92°W	SE7128
Asserby	Lincolnshire	53.26°N 00.23°E	TF4977
Asserby Turn	Lincolnshire	53.27°N 00.20°E	TF4777
Assington	Suffolk	52.00°N 00.81°E	TL9338
Assington Green	Suffolk	52.12°N 00.58°E	TL7751
Astbury	Cheshire East	53.14°N 02.24°W	SJ8461
Astcote	Northamptonshire	52.17°N 01.02°W	SP6753
Asterby	Lincolnshire	53.29°N 00.11°W	TF2679
Asterley	Shropshire	52.65°N 02.93°W	SJ3707
Asterton	Shropshire	52.51°N 02.90°W	SO3991
Asthall	Oxfordshire	51.79°N 01.59°W	SP2811
Asthall Leigh	Oxfordshire	51.80°N 01.56°W	SP3012
Astle	Cheshire East	53.25°N 02.27°W	SJ8273
Astley	Shropshire	52.75°N 02.71°W	SJ5218
Astley	Warwickshire	52.49°N 01.54°W	SP3189
Astley	Wigan	53.49°N 02.45°W	SD7000
Astley	Worcestershire	52.30°N 02.32°W	SO7867
Astley Abbotts	Shropshire	52.56°N 02.44°W	SO7096
Astley Bridge	Bolton	53.60°N 02.43°W	SD7112
Astley Cross	Worcestershire	52.31°N 02.29°W	SO8069
Astley Green	Wigan	53.48°N 02.45°W	SJ7099
Astmoor	Halton	53.34°N 02.70°W	SJ5383
Aston	Berkshire	51.54°N 00.87°W	SU7884
Aston	Birmingham	52.49°N 01.88°W	SP0889
Aston (Aston-by-Sutton)	Cheshire East	53.29°N 02.67°W	SJ5578
Aston (Aston by Wrenbury)	Cheshire West and Chester	53.01°N 02.58°W	SJ6146
Aston (Derbyshire Dales)	Derbyshire	52.87°N 01.76°W	SK1631
Aston (High Peak)	Derbyshire	53.34°N 01.73°W	SK1883
Aston	Flintshire	53.19°N 03.04°W	SJ3067
Aston	Herefordshire	52.33°N 02.79°W	SO4671
Aston	Hertfordshire	51.88°N 00.15°W	TL2722
Aston	Oxfordshire	51.72°N 01.50°W	SP3403
Aston	Powys	52.51°N 03.04°W	SO2991
Aston	Rotherham	53.36°N 01.31°W	SK4685
Aston (Claverley)	Shropshire	52.54°N 02.28°W	SO8193
Aston (Wem Rural)	Shropshire	52.84°N 02.69°W	SJ5328
Aston (Wrockwardine)	Shropshire	52.68°N 02.57°W	SJ6109
Aston (Maer)	Staffordshire	52.96°N 02.37°W	SJ7541
Aston (Seighford)	Staffordshire	52.80°N 02.16°W	SJ8923
Aston Abbotts	Buckinghamshire	51.87°N 00.78°W	SP8420
Aston Bank	Worcestershire	52.32°N 02.55°W	SO6270
Aston Botterell	Shropshire	52.45°N 02.54°W	SO6384
Aston-By-Stone	Staffordshire	52.87°N 02.13°W	SJ9131
Aston Cantlow	Warwickshire	52.22°N 01.81°W	SP1359
Aston Clinton	Buckinghamshire	51.80°N 00.73°W	SP8712
Aston Crews	Herefordshire	51.90°N 02.48°W	SO6723
Aston Cross	Gloucestershire	51.99°N 02.08°W	SO9433
Aston End	Hertfordshire	51.90°N 00.15°W	TL2724
Aston Eyre	Shropshire	52.54°N 02.51°W	SO6594
Aston Fields	Worcestershire	52.31°N 02.06°W	SO9669
Aston Flamville	Leicestershire	52.52°N 01.32°W	SP4692
Aston Heath	Cheshire East	53.30°N 02.66°W	SJ5679
Aston Ingham	Herefordshire	51.90°N 02.46°W	SO6823
Aston juxta Mondrum	Cheshire East	53.10°N 02.53°W	SJ6456
Aston le Walls	Northamptonshire	52.14°N 01.28°W	SP4950
Aston Magna	Gloucestershire	52.01°N 01.72°W	SP1935
Aston Munslow	Shropshire	52.47°N 02.72°W	SO5186
Aston on Carrant	Gloucestershire	52.00°N 02.08°W	SO9434
Aston on Clun	Shropshire	52.42°N 02.89°W	SO3981
Aston-on-Trent	Derbyshire	52.85°N 01.39°W	SK4129
Aston Pigott	Shropshire	52.63°N 02.99°W	SJ3305
Aston Rogers	Shropshire	52.64°N 02.97°W	SJ3406
Aston Rowant	Oxfordshire	51.68°N 00.95°W	SU7299
Aston Sandford	Buckinghamshire	51.75°N 00.91°W	SP7507
Aston Somerville	Worcestershire	52.04°N 01.94°W	SP0438
Aston Sq	Shropshire	52.84°N 03.01°W	SJ3228
Aston Subedge	Gloucestershire	52.06°N 01.81°W	SP1341
Aston Tirrold	Oxfordshire	51.56°N 01.20°W	SU5585
Aston Upthorpe	Oxfordshire	51.57°N 01.20°W	SU5586
Astrop	Northamptonshire	52.02°N 01.27°W	SP5036
Astrope	Hertfordshire	51.81°N 00.71°W	SP8914
Astwick	Bedfordshire	52.02°N 00.23°W	TL2138
Astwith	Derbyshire	53.17°N 01.34°W	SK4464
Astwood	Milton Keynes	52.11°N 00.61°W	SP9547
Astwood (Worcester)	Worcestershire	52.21°N 02.20°W	SO8657
Astwood (Wychavon)	Worcestershire	52.28°N 02.10°W	SO9365
Astwood Bank	Worcestershire	52.25°N 01.94°W	SP0462
Aswarby	Lincolnshire	52.93°N 00.42°W	TF0639
Aswardby	Lincolnshire	53.20°N 00.05°E	TF3770

== At ==
Location	Locality	Coordinates (links to map & photo sources)	OS grid reference
Atcham	Shropshire	52.67°N 02.68°W	SJ5409
Atch Lench	Worcestershire	52.14°N 01.95°W	SP0350
Athelhampton	Dorset	50.74°N 02.32°W	SY7794
Athelington	Suffolk	52.28°N 01.22°E	TM2070
Athelney	Somerset	51.04°N 02.94°W	ST3428
Athelstaneford	East Lothian	55.98°N 02.75°W	NT5377
Atherfield Green	Isle of Wight	50.60°N 01.35°W	SZ4679
Atherington	Devon	50.98°N 04.01°W	SS5923
Atherington	West Sussex	50.79°N 00.58°W	TQ0000
Athersley North	Barnsley	53.57°N 01.47°W	SE3509
Athersley South	Barnsley	53.57°N 01.47°W	SE3509
Atherstone	Somerset	50.94°N 02.88°W	ST3816
Atherstone	Warwickshire	52.57°N 01.54°W	SP3197
Atherstone on Stour	Warwickshire	52.14°N 01.70°W	SP2050
Atherton	Wigan	53.52°N 02.49°W	SD6703
Atlow	Derbyshire	53.02°N 01.65°W	SK2348
Atrim	Dorset	50.75°N 02.79°W	SY4495
Attadale	Highland	57.38°N 05.46°W	NG9238
Attenborough	Nottinghamshire	52.90°N 01.24°W	SK5134
Atterbury	Milton Keynes	52.04°N 00.70°W	SP8939
Atterby	Lincolnshire	53.41°N 00.52°W	SK9892
Attercliffe	Sheffield	53.38°N 01.44°W	SK3788
Atterley	Shropshire	52.56°N 02.53°W	SO6497
Atterton	Leicestershire	52.57°N 01.48°W	SP3598
Attleborough	Norfolk	52.51°N 01.00°E	TM0495
Attleborough	Warwickshire	52.50°N 01.45°W	SP3790
Attlebridge	Norfolk	52.70°N 01.13°E	TG1216
Attleton Green	Suffolk	52.15°N 00.54°E	TL7454
Atwick	East Riding of Yorkshire	53.93°N 00.18°W	TA1950
Atworth	Wiltshire	51.38°N 02.20°W	ST8665

== Au ==
Location	Locality	Coordinates (links to map & photo sources)	OS grid reference
Auberrow	Herefordshire	52.11°N 02.74°W	SO4947
Aubourn	Lincolnshire	53.14°N 00.62°W	SK9262
Auchattie	Aberdeenshire	57.03°N 02.51°W	NO6994
Auchbreck	Moray	57.33°N 03.33°W	NJ2028
Auchenback	East Renfrewshire	55.79°N 04.39°W	NS5058
Auchenbainzie	Dumfries and Galloway	55.25°N 03.85°W	NX8297
Auchenblae	Aberdeenshire	56.89°N 02.46°W	NO7278
Auchencairn (Solway Firth)	Dumfries and Galloway	54.83°N 03.88°W	NX7951
Auchencairn (near Dumfries)	Dumfries and Galloway	55.14°N 03.61°W	NX9784
Auchencairn	North Ayrshire	55.49°N 05.10°W	NS0427
Auchencar	North Ayrshire	55.57°N 05.34°W	NR8936
Auchencrow	Scottish Borders	55.83°N 02.24°W	NT8560
Auchendinny	Midlothian	55.84°N 03.19°W	NT2562
Auchendryne	Aberdeenshire	57.00°N 03.41°W	NO1491
Auchengray	South Lanarkshire	55.76°N 03.61°W	NS9954
Auchenhalrig	Moray	57.63°N 03.05°W	NJ3761
Auchenharvie	North Ayrshire	55.63°N 04.78°W	NS2541
Auchenheath	South Lanarkshire	55.66°N 03.90°W	NS8043
Auchenhew	North Ayrshire	55.44°N 05.14°W	NS0121
Auchenlochan	Argyll and Bute	55.89°N 05.24°W	NR9772
Auchenmalg	Dumfries and Galloway	54.83°N 04.75°W	NX2352
Auchentibber	South Lanarkshire	55.76°N 04.13°W	NS6654
Auchentiber	North Ayrshire	55.68°N 04.61°W	NS3647
Auchtertyre	Highland	57.28°N 05.58°W	NG8427
Auchinairn	City of Glasgow	55.89°N 04.22°W	NS6169
Auchinderran	Moray	57.58°N 03.00°W	NJ4055
Auchindrain	Argyll and Bute	56.17°N 05.17°W	NN0303
Auchinleck	East Ayrshire	55.46°N 04.29°W	NS5521
Auchinleish	Angus	56.72°N 03.32°W	NO1960
Auchinloch	North Lanarkshire	55.90°N 04.16°W	NS6570
Auchinraith	South Lanarkshire	55.78°N 04.09°W	NS6956
Auchenreoch	East Dunbartonshire	55.95°N 04.13°W	NS6776
Auchinstarry	North Lanarkshire	55.96°N 04.05°W	NS7276
Auchleven	Aberdeenshire	57.30°N 02.63°W	NJ6224
Auchlyne	Stirling	56.43°N 04.41°W	NN5129
Auchmillan	East Ayrshire	55.53°N 04.36°W	NS5129
Auchmithie	Angus	56.58°N 02.53°W	NO6744
Auchmuirbridge	Perth and Kinross	56.19°N 03.27°W	NO2101
Auchmuty	Fife	56.18°N 03.17°W	NO2700
Auchnacree	Angus	56.75°N 02.88°W	NO4663
Auchnagatt	Aberdeenshire	57.45°N 02.11°W	NJ9341
Auchnarrow	Moray	57.29°N 03.31°W	NJ2123
Auchterarder	Perth and Kinross	56.28°N 03.71°W	NN9412
Auchtercairn	Highland	57.72°N 05.69°W	NG8076
Auchterderran	Fife	56.14°N 03.27°W	NT2195
Auchtermuchty	Fife	56.28°N 03.24°W	NO2311
Auchtertool	Fife	56.09°N 03.25°W	NT2290
Auchtubh	Stirling	56.35°N 04.34°W	NN5520
Auckley	Doncaster	53.50°N 01.02°W	SE6501
Audenshaw	Tameside	53.47°N 02.12°W	SJ9297
Audlem	Cheshire East	52.98°N 02.50°W	SJ6643
Audley	Staffordshire	53.04°N 02.31°W	SJ7950
Audley End (Gestingthorpe)	Essex	52.00°N 00.63°E	TL8137
Audley End (Saffron Walden)	Essex	52.01°N 00.21°E	TL5237
Audley End	Norfolk	52.39°N 01.14°E	TM1482
Audley End	Suffolk	52.14°N 00.70°E	TL8553
Aughertree	Cumbria	54.73°N 03.16°W	NY2538
Aughton	East Riding of Yorkshire	53.83°N 00.93°W	SE7038
Aughton (Halton)	Lancashire	54.09°N 02.68°W	SD5567
Aughton (West Lancashire)	Lancashire	53.53°N 02.92°W	SD3905
Aughton	Rotherham	53.36°N 01.32°W	SK4586
Aughton	Wiltshire	51.30°N 01.67°W	SU2356
Aughton Park	Lancashire	53.54°N 02.89°W	SD4106
Aukside	Durham	54.62°N 02.09°W	NY9426
Auldearn	Highland	57.57°N 03.82°W	NH9155
Aulden	Herefordshire	52.18°N 02.79°W	SO4654
Auldgirth	Dumfries and Galloway	55.15°N 03.71°W	NX9186
Auldhouse	South Lanarkshire	55.72°N 04.19°W	NS6250
Auldyoch	Aberdeenshire	57.45°N 02.53°W	NJ6841
Auliston Point	Highland	56.64°N 05.99°W	NM550570
Aultbea	Highland	57.84°N 05.59°W	NG8789
Ault Hucknall	Derbyshire	53.18°N 01.31°W	SK4665
Aultiphurst	Highland	58.55°N 04.06°W	NC8065
Aultivullin	Highland	58.57°N 04.04°W	NC8167
Aultmore	Moray	57.56°N 03.00°W	NJ4053
Aultvaich	Highland	57.49°N 04.48°W	NH5148
Aunby	Lincolnshire	52.71°N 00.49°W	TF0214
Aunk	Devon	50.79°N 03.36°W	ST0400
Aunsby	Lincolnshire	52.92°N 00.45°W	TF0438
Auratote	Western Isles	57.15°N 07.32°W	NF7820
Auskerry	Orkney Islands	59.03°N 02.57°W	HY671163
Aust	South Gloucestershire	51.59°N 02.62°W	ST5789
Austendike	Lincolnshire	52.77°N 00.08°W	TF2921
Austen Fen	Lincolnshire	53.42°N 00.06°E	TF3794
Austenwood	Buckinghamshire	51.59°N 00.57°W	SU9989
Austerby	Lincolnshire	52.76°N 0.37°W	TF1015
Austerfield	Doncaster	53.43°N 01.00°W	SK6694
Austerlands	Oldham	53.54°N 02.07°W	SD9505
Austhorpe	Leeds	53.79°N 01.43°W	SE3733
Austrey	Warwickshire	52.65°N 01.57°W	SK2906
Austwick	North Yorkshire	54.10°N 02.36°W	SD7668
Authorpe	Lincolnshire	53.30°N 00.09°E	TF4081
Authorpe Row	Lincolnshire	53.23°N 00.29°E	TF5373

== Av ==
Location	Locality	Coordinates (links to map & photo sources)	OS grid reference
Avebury	Wiltshire	51.42°N 01.85°W	SU1069
Avebury Trusloe	Wiltshire	51.42°N 01.87°W	SU0969
Aveley	Essex	51.49°N 00.24°E	TQ5680
Avening	Gloucestershire	51.68°N 02.17°W	ST8898
Avening Green	South Gloucestershire	51.63°N 02.42°W	ST7193
Averham	Nottinghamshire	53.07°N 00.86°W	SK7654
Avernish	Highland	57.27°N 05.58°W	NG8426
Avery Hill	Greenwich	51.44°N 00.07°E	TQ4474
Aveton Gifford	Devon	50.30°N 03.84°W	SX6947
Aviemore	Highland	57.18°N 03.83°W	NH8912
Avington	Berkshire	51.41°N 01.46°W	SU3768
Avington	Hampshire	51.08°N 01.24°W	SU5332
Avoch	Highland	57.56°N 04.17°W	NH7055
Avon	Hampshire	50.94°N 01.77°W	SZ1498
Avon	Wiltshire	51.48°N 02.07°W	ST9576
Avonbridge	Falkirk	55.92°N 03.74°W	NS9172
Avoncliff	Wiltshire	51.32°N 02.28°W	ST8059
Avon Dassett	Warwickshire	52.14°N 01.40°W	SP4150
Avonmouth	City of Bristol	51.49°N 02.69°W	ST5277
Avonwick	Devon	50.40°N 03.81°W	SX7158

== Aw ==
Location	Locality	Coordinates (links to map & photo sources)	OS grid reference
Awbridge	Hampshire	51.00°N 01.53°W	SU3323
Awkley	South Gloucestershire	51.56°N 02.59°W	ST5985
Awliscombe	Devon	50.80°N 03.23°W	ST1301
Awre	Gloucestershire	51.77°N 02.43°W	SO7008
Awsworth	Nottinghamshire	52.98°N 01.28°W	SK4843

== Ax ==
Location	Locality	Coordinates (links to map & photo sources)	OS grid reference
Axbridge	Somerset	51.28°N 02.81°W	ST4354
Axford	Hampshire	51.18°N 01.12°W	SU6143
Axford	Wiltshire	51.41°N 01.67°W	SU2369
Axmansford	Hampshire	51.34°N 01.19°W	SU5661
Axminster	Devon	50.77°N 03.00°W	SY2998
Axmouth	Devon	50.71°N 03.06°W	SY2591
Axton	Flintshire	53.30°N 03.35°W	SJ1080
Axtown	Devon	50.48°N 04.10°W	SX5167
Axwell Park	Gateshead	54.94°N 01.70°W	NZ1961

== Ay ==
Location	Locality	Coordinates (links to map & photo sources)	OS grid reference
Aycliff	Kent	51.11°N 01.28°E	TR3040
Aycliffe Village	Durham	54.59°N 01.56°W	NZ2822
Aydon	Northumberland	54.98°N 02.00°W	NZ0066
Aykley Heads	Durham	54.78°N 01.59°W	NZ2643
Aylburton	Gloucestershire	51.70°N 02.56°W	SO6101
Aylburton Common	Gloucestershire	51.71°N 02.58°W	SO6002
Ayle	Northumberland	54.83°N 02.45°W	NY7149
Aylesbeare	Devon	50.71°N 03.37°W	SY0392
Aylesbury	Buckinghamshire	51.81°N 00.82°W	SP8113
Aylesby	North East Lincolnshire	53.54°N 00.19°W	TA2007
Aylesford	Kent	51.29°N 00.46°E	TQ7258
Aylesham	Kent	51.22°N 01.19°E	TR2352
Aylestone	City of Leicester	52.59°N 01.15°W	SK5700
Aylestone Hill	Herefordshire	52.05°N 02.70°W	SO5240
Aylestone Park	City of Leicester	52.60°N 01.14°W	SK5801
Aylmerton	Norfolk	52.90°N 01.24°E	TG1839
Aylsham	Norfolk	52.79°N 01.24°E	TG1927
Aylton	Herefordshire	52.03°N 02.51°W	SO6537
Aylworth	Gloucestershire	51.89°N 01.85°W	SP1022
Aymestrey	Herefordshire	52.28°N 02.85°W	SO4265
Aynho	Northamptonshire	51.99°N 01.25°W	SP5133
Ayot Green	Hertfordshire	51.81°N 00.24°W	TL2114
Ayot St Lawrence	Hertfordshire	51.83°N 00.27°W	TL1916
Ayot St Peter	Hertfordshire	51.82°N 00.24°W	TL2115
Ayr	South Ayrshire	55.46°N 04.63°W	NS3421
Ayres End	Hertfordshire	51.79°N 00.33°W	TL1512
Ayres of Selivoe	Shetland Islands	60.21°N 01.49°W	HU2848
Ayre's Quay	Sunderland	54.90°N 01.39°W	NZ3957
Aysgarth	North Yorkshire	54.28°N 02.00°W	SE0088
Ayshford	Devon	50.92°N 03.36°W	ST0415
Ayside	Cumbria	54.23°N 02.93°W	SD3983
Ayston	Rutland	52.60°N 00.73°W	SK8601
Aythorpe Roding	Essex	51.80°N 00.30°E	TL5914
Ayton	Scottish Borders	55.84°N 02.12°W	NT9261
Ayton	Tyne and Wear	54.88°N 01.56°W	NZ2855
Ayton Castle	Scottish Borders	55.84°N 02.12°W	NT9261

== Az ==
Location	Locality	Coordinates (links to map & photo sources)	OS grid reference
Azerley	North Yorkshire	54.16°N 01.61°W	SE2574
