= Ashfield =

Ashfield may refer to:

== People ==
- Ashfield (surname)

== Places ==
=== Australia ===
- Ashfield, New South Wales, a suburb of Sydney
  - Municipality of Ashfield, a former local government area in Sydney
  - Electoral district of Ashfield, a former electoral district
- Ashfield, Queensland, a mixed residential and rural locality in the Bundaberg Region
- Ashfield, Western Australia, a suburb of Perth

=== Canada ===
- Ashfield, Ontario, in Ashfield–Colborne–Wawanosh

=== Republic of Ireland ===
- Ashfield, a townland of County Laois
- Ashfield, County Offaly, townland in the civil parish of Durrow, barony of Ballycowan
- Ashfeild east Kilkenny

=== United Kingdom ===
==== England ====
- Ashfield, Hampshire, a village
- Ashfield, Herefordshire, place in Herefordshire
- HM Prison Ashfield, a prison for young people near Bristol
- Ashfield District, Nottinghamshire
  - Ashfield (UK Parliament constituency)
- Ashfield, Shropshire
- Ashfield, Suffolk, a village, now often known as Ashfield cum Thorpe
- Great Ashfield, a village in Suffolk

==== Northern Ireland ====
- Ashfield, County Down, the location of Ashfield Halt railway station

==== Scotland ====
- Ashfield, Argyll and Bute
- Ashfield, Stirling, a village in the Stirling council area

==== Wales ====
- Ashfield, Carmarthenshire

=== United States ===
- Ashfield, Massachusetts, a town
- Ashfield, Pennsylvania, an unincorporated community

== Schools ==
- Ashfield College, Dublin, Ireland
- Ashfield School (disambiguation)

== Other uses ==
- Ashfield F.C., a football club from Glasgow
- Ashfield railway station (disambiguation)
- Ashfield baronets, an extinct title in the Baronetage of England

== See also ==
- Ashfields, a village in Shropshire, England
