= Aston (disambiguation) =

Aston is a district of Birmingham, England.

Aston may also refer to:

== Places ==
=== United Kingdom ===
==== In Birmingham ====
- Aston (Birmingham ward)
- Aston Hall, a mansion
- Aston railway station

==== Elsewhere in England ====
- Aston, Berkshire
- Aston Abbotts, Buckinghamshire
- Aston Clinton, Buckinghamshire
- Aston Mullins, Buckinghamshire
- Aston Sandford, Buckinghamshire
- Aston by Budworth, Cheshire (near Northwich)
- Aston-by-Sutton, Cheshire (near Runcorn)
- Aston by Wrenbury, Cheshire (south-west of Nantwich; near Audlem)
- Aston juxta Mondrum, Cheshire (north of Nantwich)
- Aston, Derbyshire Dales, Derbyshire
- Aston, High Peak, Derbyshire
- Aston-on-Trent, Derbyshire
- Aston Blank or Cold Aston, Gloucestershire
- Aston Magna, Gloucestershire
- Aston on Carrant, Gloucestershire
- Aston Subedge, Gloucestershire
- Aston Ingham, Herefordshire
- Aston, Hertfordshire
- Aston Flamville, Leicestershire
- Aston le Walls, Northamptonshire
- Aston, Oxfordshire, in West Oxfordshire
- Aston Rowant, Oxfordshire
- Aston Tirrold, Oxfordshire
- Aston Upthorpe, Oxfordshire
- Steeple Aston, Oxfordshire
- Aston, Claverley, a location in Shropshire
- Aston, Telford and Wrekin, in the parish of Wrockwardine, Shropshire
- Aston, Wem Rural, Shropshire
- Aston Botterell, Shropshire
- Aston Eyre, Shropshire
- Aston on Clun, Shropshire
- Aston Pigott, Shropshire
- Aston, South Yorkshire
- Aston, Newcastle-under-Lyme, a location in Staffordshire
- Aston, Stafford, Doxey, Staffordshire
- Aston-by-Stone, Staffordshire
- Aston Cantlow, Warwickshire
- Aston Somerville, Worcestershire

==== In Wales ====
- Aston, Flintshire
- Aston, Powys, a location

=== Other countries ===
- Division of Aston, an electoral division in Victoria, Australia
- Aston, Ariège, France
- Aston Quay, one of the Dublin quays, Ireland
- Aston Township, Pennsylvania, United States

=== Extraterrestrial ===
- Aston (crater) on the Moon, named for Francis William Aston

== Schools ==
- Aston University, Birmingham, England
- Aston Comprehensive School, South Yorkshire, England

== People ==
- Aston (name)

== Other uses ==
- Aston Dark Space, the dark region between the cathode and the cathode glow in a vacuum tube
- Archipelago International, a hotel management company formerly named Aston
- Aston process, used to produce wrought iron
- Aston (band), Australian classical band who cover popular music, featured on The Matty Johns Show
- Lord Aston of Forfar, a title in the peerage of Scotland
- A synonym for the lower third, graphics on the bottom part of a television screen

== See also ==
- Aston Hall (disambiguation)
- Aston Park (disambiguation)
- Ashton (disambiguation)
