= List of places in Stirling (council area) =

This article is a list of towns, village, hamlet and settlements in the Stirling council area of Scotland.

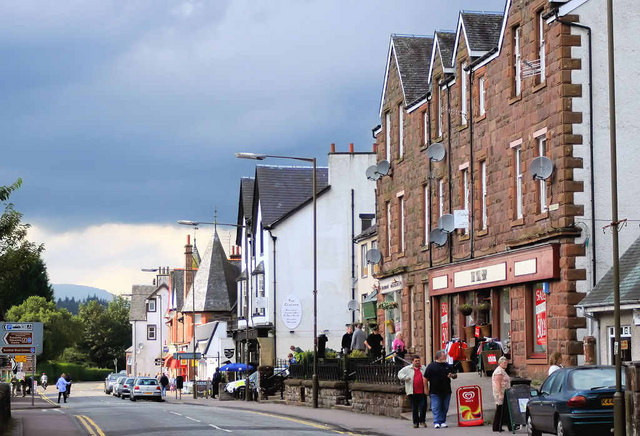
Aberfoyle, Main Street

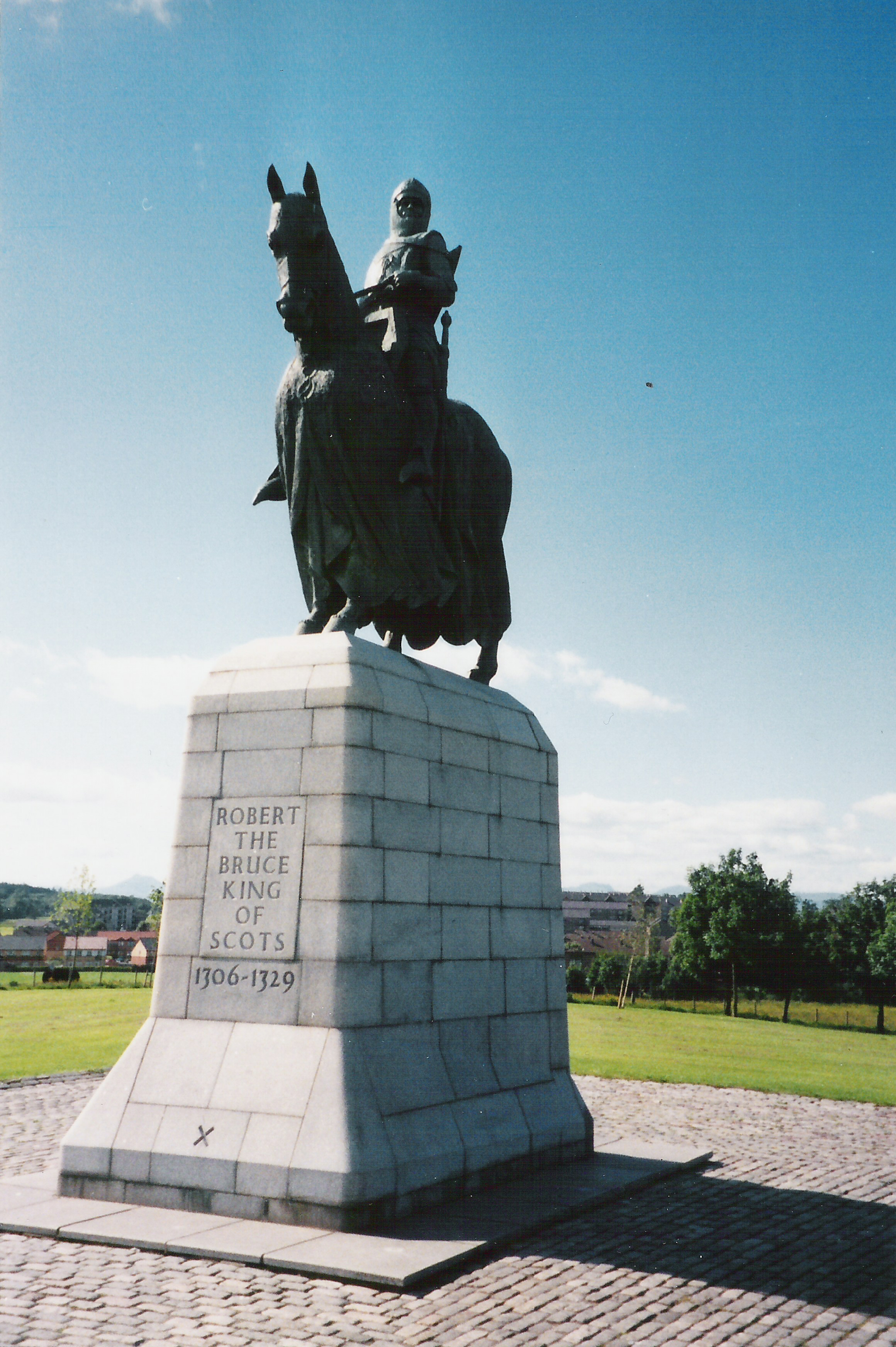
Bannockburn

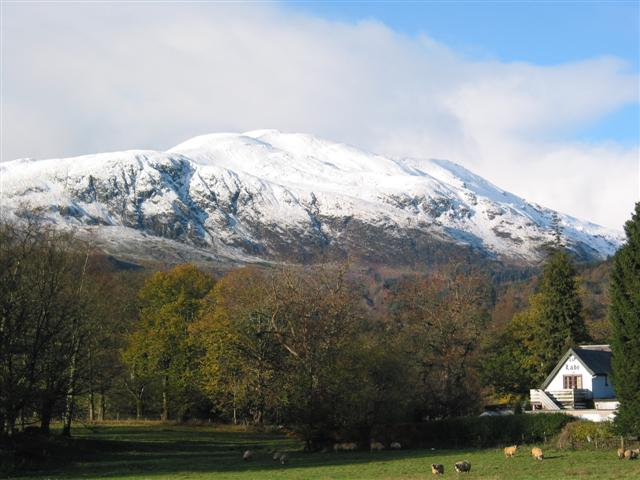
Ben Ledi from Kilmahog

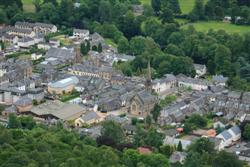
Callander

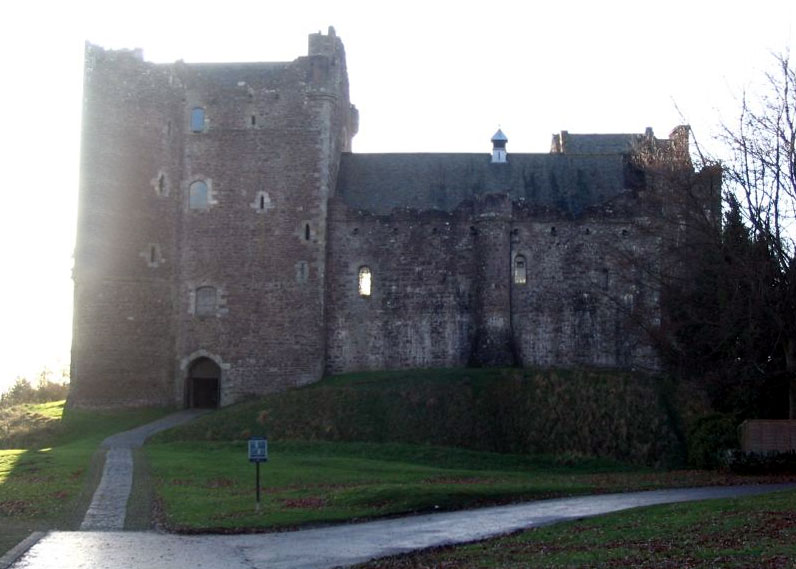
Doune Castle

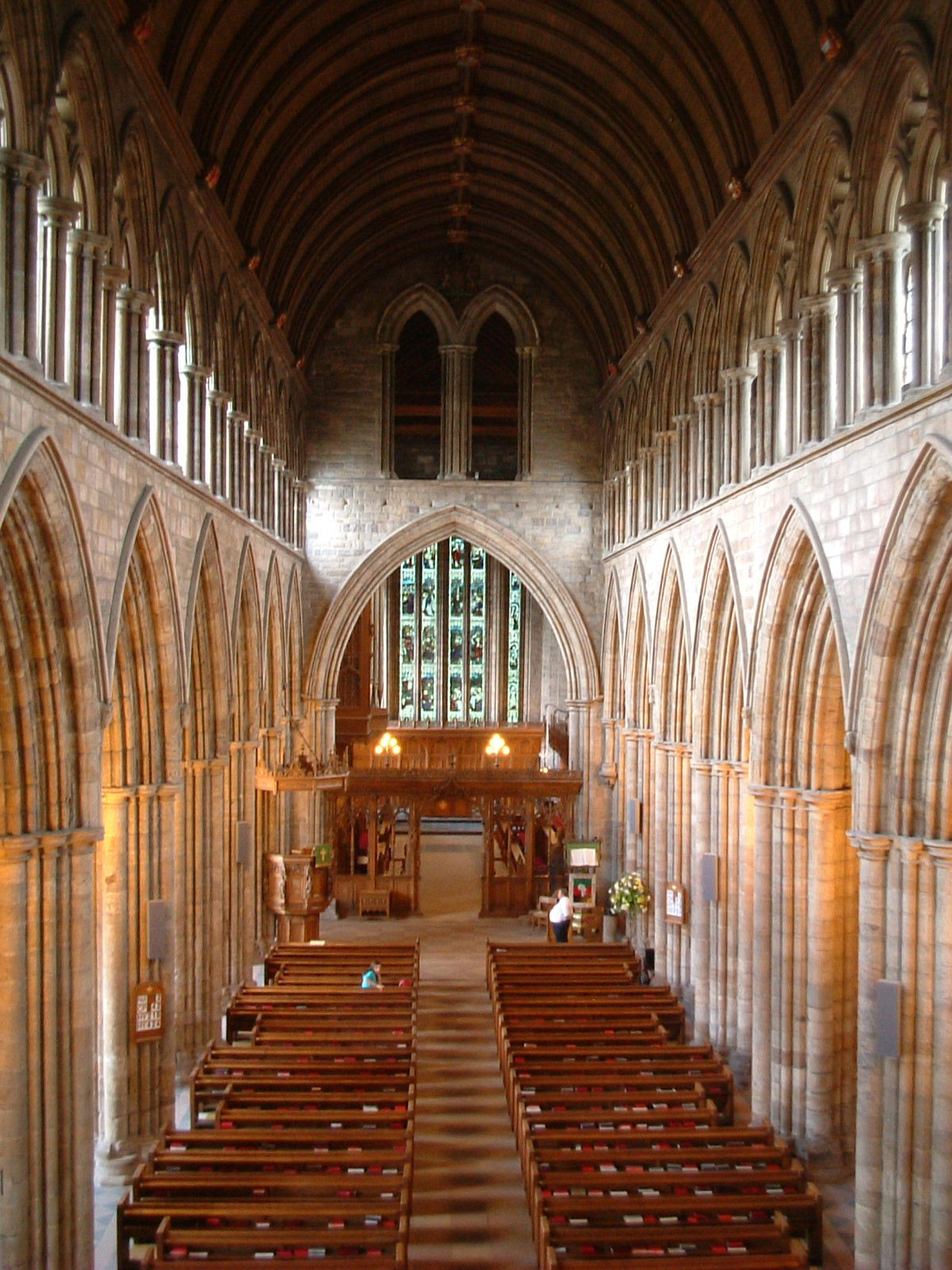
Dunblane Cathedral

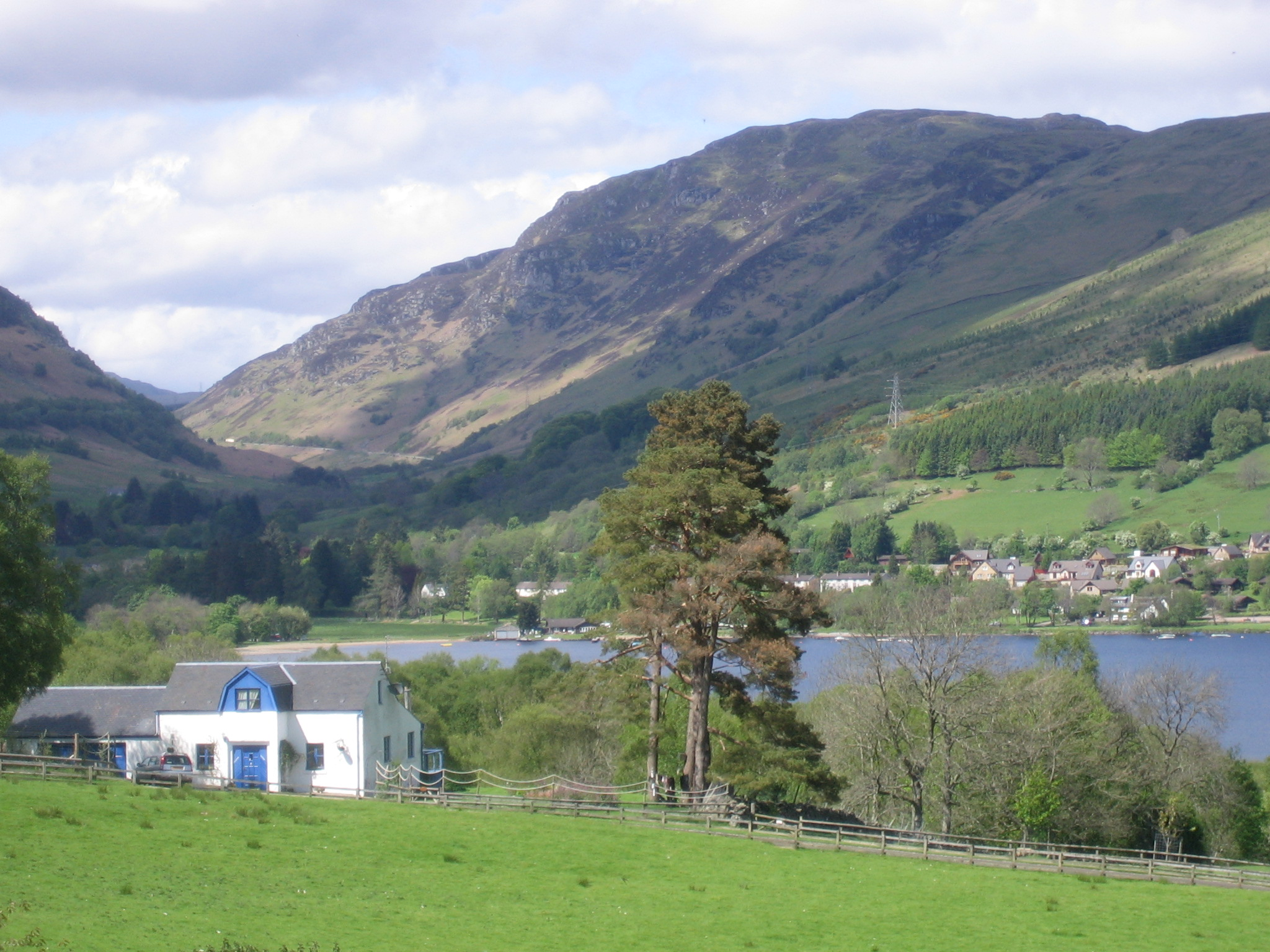
Lochearnhead

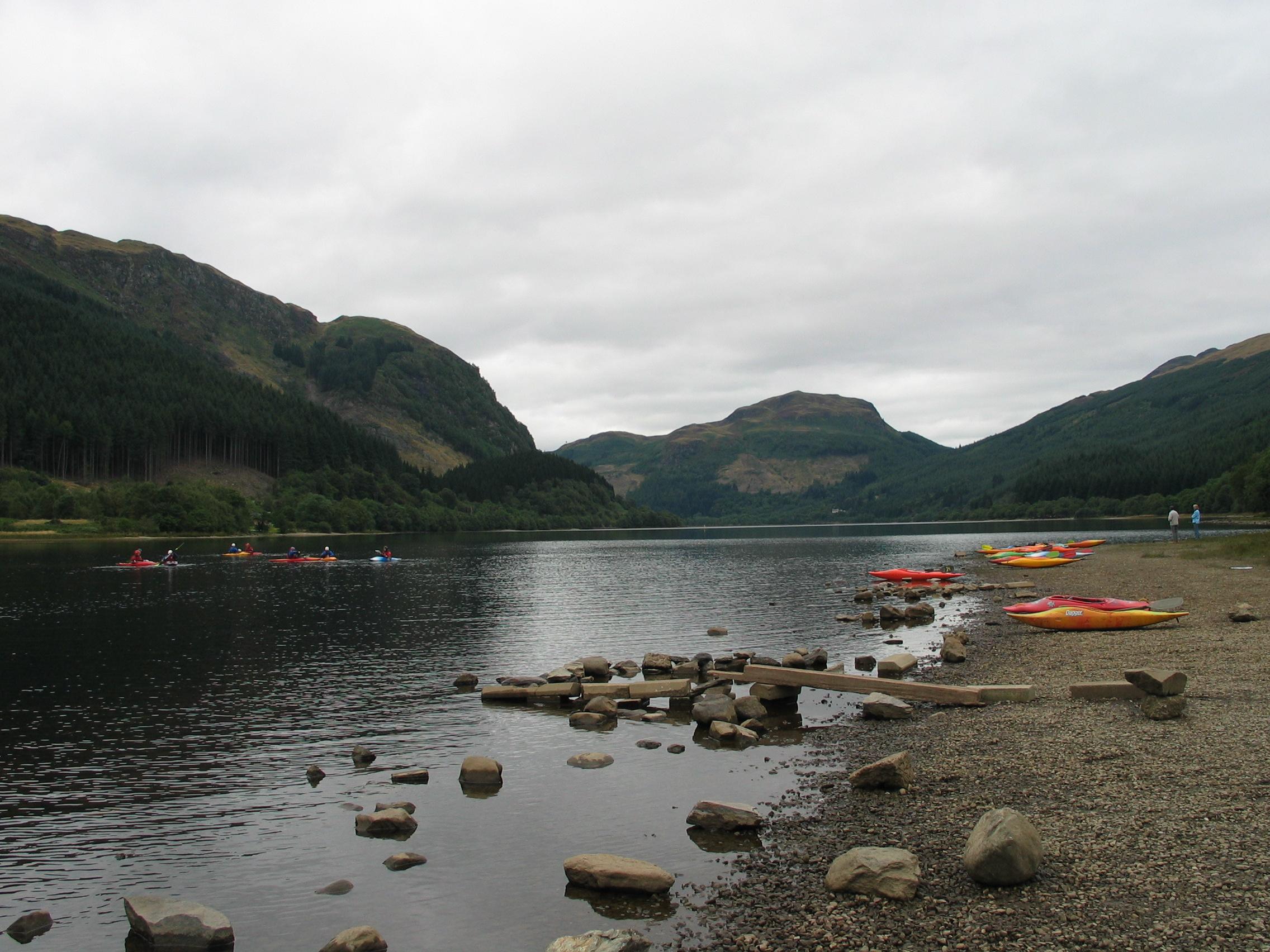
Loch Lubnaig

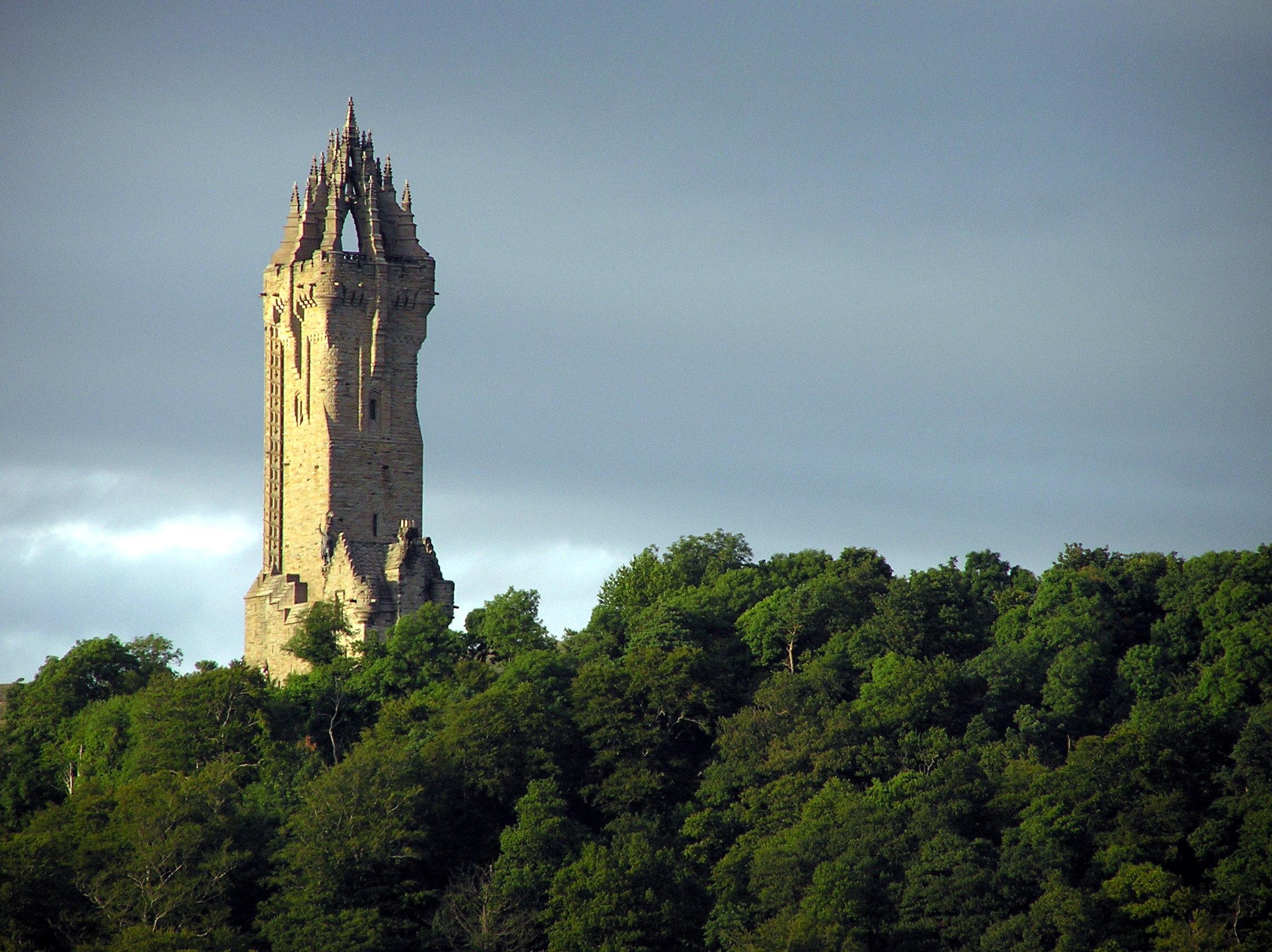
Wallace Monument

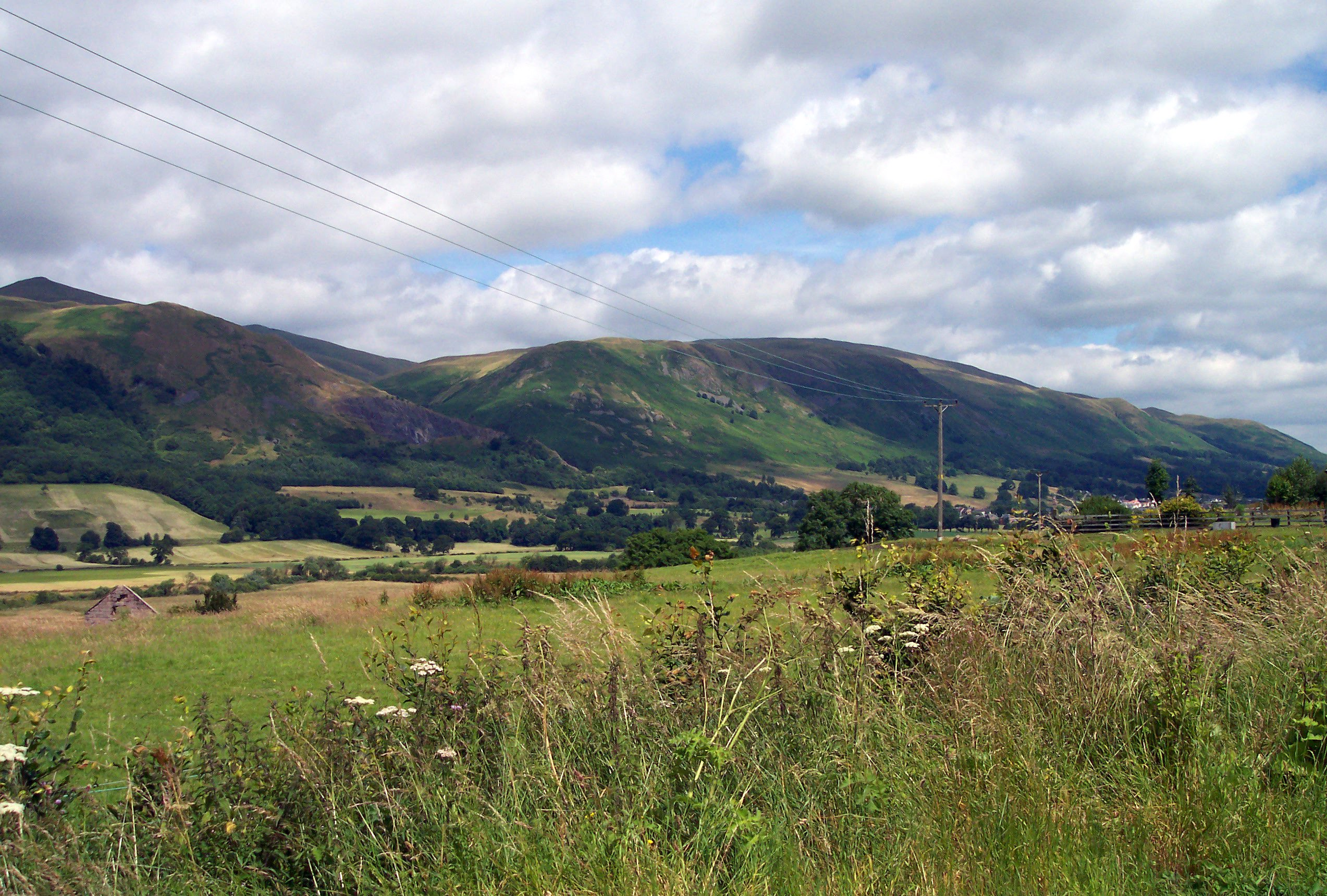
Ochil Hills

== A ==
- Abbey Craig
- Aberfoyle
- Ardchyle
- Ardeonaig
- Arnprior
- Ashfield
- Auchlyne

== B ==
- Balfron,
- Balmaha
- Bannockburn,
- Ben Ledi
- Blair Drummond,
- Blairlogie
- Blanefield
- Boquhan
- Boreland
- Braeval
- Brig o' Turk
- Bridge of Allan
- Broomridge
- Buchlyvie

== C ==
- Callander,
- Cambusbarron
- Cambuskenneth,
- Campsie Fells
- Carbeth
- Carse of Lecropt
- Cauldhame
- Cobleland
- Cornton,
- Cowie
- Craigdownings
- Craighat
- Craigruie
- Crianlarich
- Croftamie

== D ==
- Dalmary
- Deanston
- Doune, Doune Castle
- Drymen
- Dumgoyne
- Dumyat
- Dunblane,
- Dykehead

== F ==
- Fallin
- Falls of Dochart
- Falls of Lochay
- Fintry,
- Flanders Moss

== G ==
- Garbh Uisge
- Gargunnock,
- Gartachoil
- Gartmore
- Gartness
- Glen Dochart
- Glengoyne Distillery

== I ==
- Inchmahome,
- Inchtalla
- Inversnaid

== K ==
- Killearn
- Killin
- Kinbuck
- Kinlochard
- Kippen

== L ==
- Lake of Menteith
- Lecropt, Lecropt Kirk, Carse of Lecropt
- Logie

== M ==
- Milton
- Milton of Buchanan
- Moirlanich Longhouse
- Mugdock,

== O ==
- Old Plean

== P ==
- Pass of Leny
- Plean
- Port Of Menteith

== R ==
- Raploch

== S ==
- Stirling,
- St Ninians
- Strathblane
- Strathyre
- Stronachlachar

== T ==
- Tamavoid
- Thornhill
- Throsk
- Tolbooth
- Touch, Touch Hills
- Torbrex Village
- Tyndrum

== U ==
- University of Stirling

== W ==
- West Highland Way
