= Ashill =

Ashill may refer to:

- Ashill, Cornwall
- Ashill, Devon
- Ashill, Norfolk
- Ashill, Somerset
