= Ashfield Green =

Ashfield Green can refer to:

- Ashfield Green, Mid Suffolk, a hamlet near Stradbroke in Suffolk, England
- Ashfield Green, St Edmundsbury, a hamlet near Wickhambrook in Suffolk, England
