= Astwood =

Astwood may refer to:

- Astwood, Buckinghamshire, a village and civil parish in the Borough of Milton Keynes, England
- Astwood (surname)
- Astwood, Worcester, Worcestershire, a location in England
- Astwood, Wychavon, Worcestershire, a location in England
- Astwood Bank, Worcestershire, England
