= Aspley =

Aspley may refer to the following places:

== Australia ==
- Aspley, Queensland, a suburb of Brisbane
- Electoral district of Aspley, an electorate in the Queensland Legislative Assembly

== United Kingdom ==
- Aspley, Nottingham, Nottinghamshire, England
- Aspley, Staffordshire, England, a location
- Aspley, West Yorkshire, England
- Aspley Guise and Aspley Heath, Bedfordshire, England
