= Astwood (surname) =

Astwood is a surname. Notable people with the surname include:

- Cynthia Astwood (born 1946), British diplomat
- Edwin Astwood (born 1973), Turks and Caicos Islands politician
- Edwin B. Astwood (1909–1976), Bermudian-American physiologist and endocrinologist
- Glenn Astwood, (born 1954), Bermudian sailor
- Jeffrey Carlton Astwood (1907−1997), Bermudian politician
- Jeffrey Christopher Astwood (born 1933), Bermudian politician
- Norma Cox Astwood, Bermudian psychologist
- Stephen Astwood (born 1981), Bermudian football player
- William Marischal Astwood, Bermudian politician
