= Listed buildings in Askwith =

Askwith is a civil parish in the county of North Yorkshire, England. It contains 15 listed buildings that are recorded in the National Heritage List for England. All the listed buildings are designated at Grade II, the lowest of the three grades, which is applied to "buildings of national importance and special interest". The parish, which is sparsely populated, contains the village of Askwith and the surrounding countryside. The listed buildings consist of houses, cottages and associated structures, farmhouses and farm buildings.

== Buildings ==
Name and location	Photograph	Date	Notes
Scales House and outbuilding 53.93981°N 1.75183°W		Early 17th century	The house and attached outbuilding are in gritstone, with a stone slate roof, and two storeys. The house has three bays, and a central doorway with chamfered quoined jambs, and a shallow triangular-headed lintel. Flanking the doorway are sash windows with chamfered surrounds, above it is an oval window, and the other upper floor windows are recessed, chamfered and mullioned, with some mullions removed. The lower outbuilding, partly incorporated into the house, has two bays, a porch and altered windows.
Old Vicarage; 53.92879°N 1.73813°W	—	17th century	The vicarage, later a private house, is in gritstone, with quoins, stone gutter brackets, and a hipped stone slate roof. There are three storeys and four bays. The doorway has quoined jambs, and a shallow triangular-headed lintel. Flanking it are two-storey bay windows, and the other windows are mullioned and transomed, those in the ground floor under a continuous hood mould.
Low Hall Farmhouse, barn and byre range 53.95999°N 1.72568°W	—	Late 17th century	The buildings are in gritstone with quoins and stone slate roofs. The house has two storeys and four bays. On the front is a projecting two-storey porch with pyramidal finials, containing an entrance with an elliptical-arched lintel and tie-stone jambs. The windows are recessed, chamfered and mullioned, with a continuous hood mould over the ground floor, and the gables are coped, with bulbous kneelers and finials. The barn and byre range to the right have five bays, and contain a segmental-arched cart entrance with quoined jambs, doors and windows, and there are external stone steps.
Gate piers, Shaw Hall; 53.96622°N 1.74286°W		Late 17th century	The gate piers flanking the entrance to the drive are in stone and about 2 metres (6 ft 7 in) high. They have banded rustication, hollow moulded cornices, and stepped pyramidal finials.
Manor House; 53.93078°N 1.74478°W		1681	The house is in gritstone, with quoins, and a stone slate roof with gable copings, moulded kneelers, and a ball finial on the left. There are two storeys and four bays. The doorway has a quoined chamfered surround, and above it is an oval window inscribed with initials and the date. The windows are sashes with chamfered surrounds, those in the ground floor with hood moulds.
Sundial Farmhouse and barn 53.93130°N 1.74731°W	—	1681	The farmhouse and attached barn are in gritstone, with quoins, stone slate roofs with a coped gable on the right, and two storeys. The house has three bays, and contains a doorway with short and long quoined jambs, and a lintel with a cambered arch. The windows are sashes, some with retained mullions. In the upper floor is an oval window with an initialled lintel, and a rectangular sundial with initials and the date. The barn, dating from the late 18th century, projects and has three bays. It contains a central doorway with quoined jambs, and a cambered arch with a keystone, and there are three tiers of slit vents.
Low Snowden and outbuilding 53.96102°N 1.72664°W	—	1683 and earlier	The farmhouse has a timber-framed core, and it was encased in gritstone in 1683. It has a roof of purple slates, and a continuous moulded string course. There are two storeys, two bays, and a rear outshut. The doorway has quoined jambs, a moulded surround, and a large initialled and dated lintel. The windows are recessed chamfered and mullioned, some with inserted sashes. The outbuilding has a stone slate roof with gable coping and kneelers, two storeys, two bays and a rear extension. The openings include a doorway with quoined jambs converted into a window, pitching doors, and other windows, and there are external steps to a doorway.
Shaw Hall; 53.96631°N 1.74193°W	—	1687	The house is in gritstone, with quoins, a continuous hood mould, and a stone slate roof, partly replaced by grey slates, with moulded gable copings, bulbous kneelers, and a ball finial on the right. There are two storeys and four bays. In the second bay is a gabled porch, and a doorway with quoined chamfered jambs and a shallow-arched inscribed and dated lintel, above which is a segmental-arched niche containing a carved head on a plinth, initials and a date. Most of the windows are mullioned and transomed. In the angle between the porch and the house is a curved wall containing a blocked segmental-arched window.
Quaker Cottage; 53.92724°N 1.74209°W	—	1704	A Friends' Meeting House, later a private house, in gritstone, with quoins, and a stone slate roof with bulbous kneelers. There is a single storey and attics, and three bays. The central doorway has chamfered quoined jambs, and a dated lintel, and the windows are recessed, chamfered and mullioned.
Carr Farmhouse; 53.92974°N 1.76303°W		Mid to late 18th century	The farmhouse is in gritstone with a stone slate roof. There are two storeys, two bays and a rear outshut. The doorway has tie-stone jambs, and the windows are mullioned with three lights.
Barn east of Low Snowden; 53.96109°N 1.72623°W	—	Mid to late 18th century	The barn is in gritstone, with quoins, and a stone slate roof with gable copings and bulbous kneelers. There are six bays and an outshut on the right. In the centre is a cart entrance with quoined jambs, the other doorways have tie-stone jambs, and there is a square pitching door.
Quarry House and farm buildings 53.93984°N 1.75713°W	—	Mid to late 18th century	The buildings are in gritstone with quoins and stone slate roofs with gable copings and shaped kneelers. The house has two storeys and two bays. It contains a central doorway, and the windows are mullioned. Attached on the left are four-bay outbuildings and a projecting three-bay byre and barn range. The openings include segmental-headed cart entrances with quoined jambs, doors and windows, slit vents and a pitching door.
Ibbotson Farmhouse and barn 53.92927°N 1.74009°W		Late 18th century	The farmhouse and barn are in gritstone, and have stone slate roofs with gable copings and shaped kneelers, and two storeys. The house has two bays, and a later bay added to the right. The doorway has a raised surround, the windows in the original part are mullioned with three lights, and in the added bay are top-hung two-light casements with a mullion. The barn on the left has three bays, and contains a central cart entrance with a cambered arch and quoined jambs, and doorways.
East Lodges and walls, Denton Park; 53.93153°N 1.76467°W		1778 (probable)	The lodges at the entrance to the grounds of Denton Hall were designed by John Carr, and are in stone with pointed slate roofs. They have a single storey and an octagonal plan, and contain sash windows and a dentilled eaves cornice. The entrance is flanked by square stone gate piers with rusticated quoins, a fluted band, an entablature with paterae, and a cornice surmounted by festooned urns, and the gates are in wrought iron. The piers are flanked by walls containing round-arched pedestrian gateways. Outside these are walls with rounded coping, ending in rusticated piers with shallow pyramidal finials.
Pump and trough, Quarry House; 53.93984°N 1.75670°W	—	Mid to late 19th century	The pump, to the east of the house, is in cast iron, and about 1.2 metres (3 ft 11 in) high. On the stem are three moulded bands, the spout is decorated with a raised leaf motif, and the top has a fluted cap with a finial. On the south side is a flag motif. The trough is cut from a solid block of gritstone, and measures about 40 centimetres (16 in) high, 60 centimetres (24 in) wide, and about 1 metre (3 ft 3 in) long.
