= Coltsfoot Green =

Hamlet in Suffolk, England

Coordinates: 52.170°N 0.557°E

- Location within Suffolk
- Civil parish: Wickhambrook
- District: Mid Suffolk
- Shire county: Suffolk
- Region: East
- Country: England
- Sovereign state: United Kingdom
- Police: Suffolk
- Fire: Suffolk
- Ambulance: East of England

Coltsfoot Green is a small hamlet within the parish of Wickhambrook, in the Mid Suffolk district, in the county of Suffolk, England. It constitutes one of its eleven village greens and consists of a small green with a small tributary of the River Glem running through it. Until 2009 there was a small copse on the green which was removed due to the poor condition of the trees. Replanting was anticipated in 2010 but the Estates Committee of the Parish Council decided to leave the Green without further planting for the foreseeable future. A water well resided on the green until it was filled in at an unknown date although evidence of its existence was demonstrated when the copse was removed. On the Green is also a memorial bench which looks out over the Green towards Coltsfoot Close.

== Roads ==
Off the green to the north is a byway which runs alongside the River Glem towards Ousden emerging at Australia Farm and continuing to Busses Farm, Coltsfoot Close is to the south and the road which abuts it in a westerly direction leads to Meeting Green and in the easterly direction to the Duddery and Fuller's Hill.

== Housing ==
The age of the housing round Coltsfoot Green varies greatly. Some properties are period thatched cottages whilst others such as those in Coltsfoot Close date from 1970. In total there are about 30 houses around Coltsfoot Green.
