= Stoneywood =

Stoneywood can refer to the following:

- Stoneywood, Falkirk, a village in Falkirk, Scotland, UK
- Stoneywood, Aberdeen, an area of the City of Aberdeen, Scotland, UK
- F.C. Stoneywood, a football club from the Stoneywood area of Aberdeen
