= Ashfield (surname) =

Ashfield is a surname. Notable people with the surname include:

- Edmund Ashfield (Catholic agent) (died c.1620), English Catholic agent
- Edmund Ashfield, 17th-century English painter
- George Ashfield (1934–1985), English former footballer
- Kate Ashfield (born 1972), British actress
- Keith Ashfield (1952–2018), Canadian politician
- Kim Ashfield (born 1959), Welsh model
- Lionel Ashfield (1898–1918), British WWI flying ace
- Robert Ashfield (1911–2006), English musician and composer
- Stephen Ashfield, Scottish actor
- William Rey Ashfield (born 1959), Uruguayan architectural historian
