= Dalmary =

Coordinates: 56.1292°N 4.3883°W

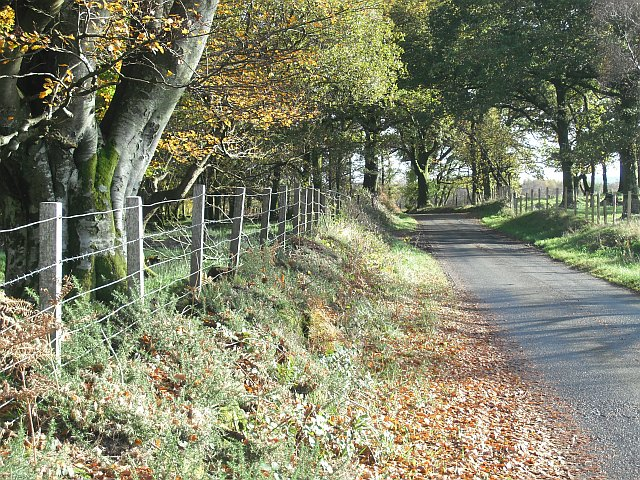
- A single track road in Dalmary passing Ward Wood

- Location within the Stirling council area
- Civil parish: Drymen
- Council area: Stirling
- Lieutenancy area: Stirling and Falkirk
- Country: Scotland
- Sovereign state: United Kingdom
- Post town: Stirling
- Postcode district: FK8
- Police: Scotland
- Fire: Scottish
- Ambulance: Scottish
- UK Parliament: Stirling and Strathallan
- Scottish Parliament: Stirling

Dalmary is a small hamlet in Stirling, Scotland, situated in the civil parish of Drymen.

Unlike other settlements in the Drymen civil parish, Dalmary has an FK postcode whereas Drymen has a G postcode. It is also in the catchment area for Gartmore Primary School, which is in the catchment area for McLaren High School, however Dalmary is in the catchment area for Balfron High School.
