= Auchbreck =

Coordinates: 57.341°N 03.314°W

Auchbreck: Scottish Gaelic: An t-Achadh Breac
- Location within Moray
- OS grid reference: NJ2028
- Council area: Moray
- Lieutenancy area: Banffshire
- Country: Scotland
- Sovereign state: United Kingdom
- Police: Scotland
- Fire: Scottish
- Ambulance: Scottish

Auchbreck (Scottish Gaelic: An t-Achadh Breac, meaning the speckled field) is a village in Moray, Scotland.
