= Ashculme =

Hamlet in Devon, England

Coordinates: 50.927638°N 3.215101°W

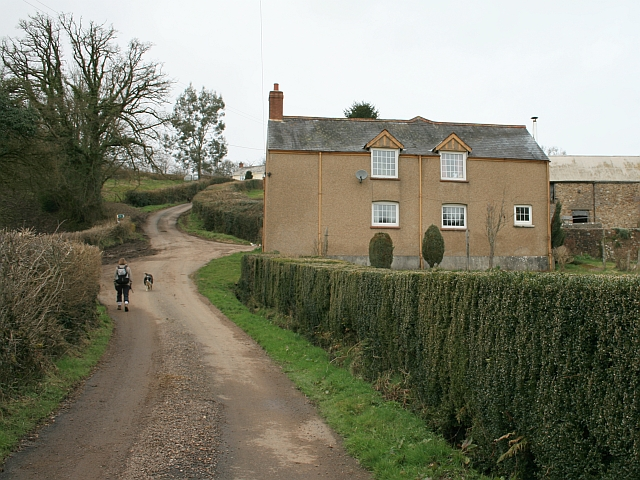
- Middle Ashculm Farm on Ashculme Hill

- Location within Devon
- OS grid reference: ST1414
- Shire county: Devon
- Region: South West
- Country: England
- Sovereign state: United Kingdom
- Police: Devon and Cornwall
- Fire: Devon and Somerset
- Ambulance: South Western

Ashculme is a hamlet in Devon.
