= Ash Mill =

Village in Devon, England

Coordinates: 50.99°N 03.73°W

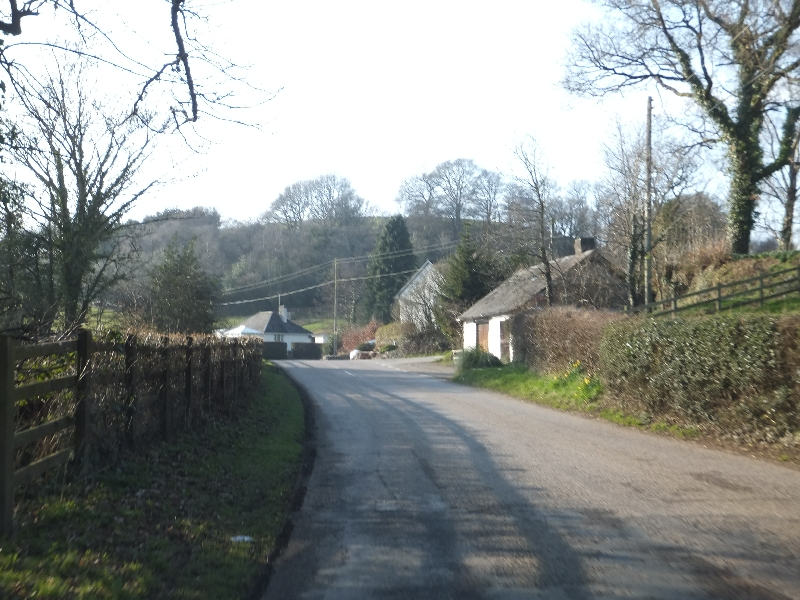
- Houses in Ash Mill at the foot of Ash Mill Hill

- Location within Devon
- OS grid reference: SS7823
- Shire county: Devon
- Region: South West
- Country: England
- Sovereign state: United Kingdom
- Dialling code: 01769
- Police: Devon and Cornwall
- Fire: Devon and Somerset
- Ambulance: South Western

Ash Mill is a village in Devon, England.

Ashmill was the site of Ashwater station on the former L.S.W.R. North Cornwall line which closed in the 1960s. The station is now a private residence.
