= Ashfield School =

Ashfield School may refer to:

- Ashfield School, Kirkby-in-Ashfield, a secondary school in Nottinghamshire, England
- Ashfield School, a special-needs school in Liverpool, England
- Ashfield Secondary Modern School a former secondary school in York, England
- Ashfield Boys' High School, a secondary school in Belfast, Northern Ireland
- Ashfield Boys High School, a secondary school in Sydney, Australia

== See also ==
- Ashfield College, Dublin, Ireland
