= Askwith =

Village and civil parish in North Yorkshire, England

Coordinates: 53.93031°N 1.74394°W

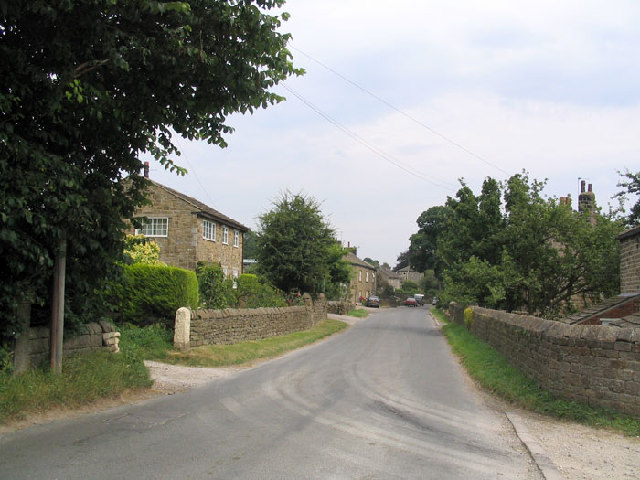
- Main street in Askwith looking towards Otley

- Location within North Yorkshire
- Population: 240 (2011 census)
- OS grid reference: SE169482
- Unitary authority: North Yorkshire
- Ceremonial county: North Yorkshire
- Region: Yorkshire and the Humber
- Country: England
- Sovereign state: United Kingdom
- Post town: OTLEY
- Postcode district: LS21
- Police: North Yorkshire
- Fire: North Yorkshire
- Ambulance: Yorkshire

Askwith is a village and civil parish in North Yorkshire, England, with a population of 220 (2001 census), increasing to 240 at the 2011 Census. The village is located in Wharfedale, and is close to the border of West Yorkshire. Nearby towns are Otley, Ilkley and Burley-in-Wharfedale.

Until 1974 it was part of the West Riding of Yorkshire. From 1974 to 2023 it was part of the Borough of Harrogate, it is now administered by the unitary North Yorkshire Council.

Facilities include a school, a pub, and a garden nursery. An annual show is held, with attractions ranging from produce and handicraft classes, to a dog show and horse competitions, as well as stalls and entertainment. There is also a WI group and a toddler group.

Baines lists the village as "Asquith" in 1822 and Lewis as "Askwith, or Asquith" in 1848. The name of the village derives from the Old Norse ask-viðr, meaning ash wood. A derivative surname from the village is that of Asquith.

The village is related to the famous Asquith family.

== Askwith Community Primary School ==
The primary school has around 80 pupils and is constantly rated as "outstanding" in Ofsted reports.

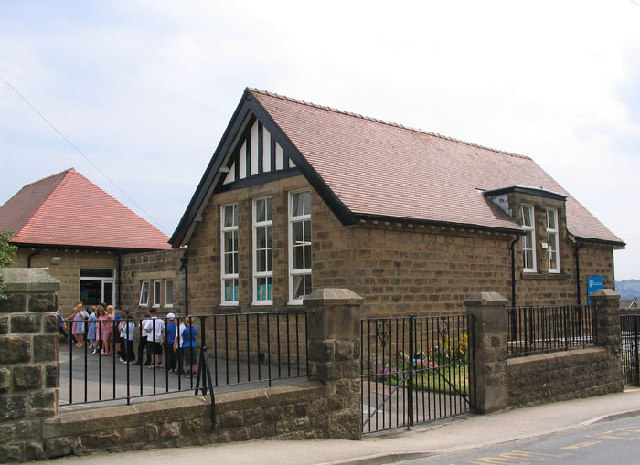
Askwith Community Primary School

== See also ==
- Listed buildings in Askwith
