= Aston Hall (disambiguation) =

Aston Hall is a Jacobean building in Aston, Birmingham, England.

Aston Hall may also refer to:

- Aston Hall, Aston on Clun, Shropshire
- Aston Hall, Aston-on-Trent, Derbyshire
- Aston Hall, Oswestry, in Shropshire
- Aston Hall, Shifnal, in Shropshire
- Aston Hall, Yorkshire

== See also ==
- Little Aston Hall, Staffordshire
