= Ashfield railway station =

Ashfield railway station may refer to:

- Ashfield Halt railway station, Northern Ireland
- Ashfield railway station (Scotland)
- Ashfield railway station, Perth, in Western Australia
- Ashfield railway station, Sydney, New South Wales
- Kirkby-in-Ashfield railway station, Nottinghamshire
