= Auchtubh =

Coordinates: 56.356°N 04.339°W

Auchtubh: Scottish Gaelic: Achadh Dubh
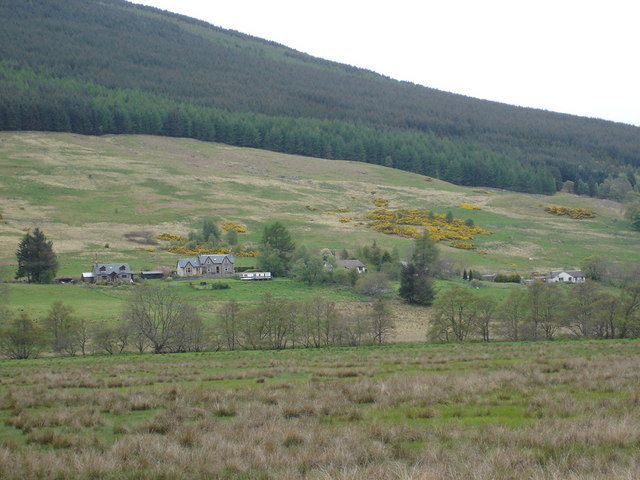
- Looking north across the floodplain of the River Balvag to Auchtubh.

- Location within the Stirling council area
- OS grid reference: NN554206
- Civil parish: Balquhidder
- Council area: Stirling
- Country: Scotland
- Sovereign state: United Kingdom
- Post town: LOCHEARNHEAD
- Postcode district: FK19
- Dialling code: 01567
- Police: Scotland
- Fire: Scottish
- Ambulance: Scottish
- UK Parliament: Stirling and Strathallan
- Scottish Parliament: Stirling

Auchtubh pronounced “Auchtoo” a hamlet in the Stirling council area of Scotland, less than 1 mile (2 kilometres) east of the village of Balquhidder. Auchtubh consisted of Croft's numbered 1 to 9, who worked as Crofters raising sheep and cattle. The crofters helped each other with harvesting and other work. The last worked Croft was number 8 Auchtubh next to Coshnachie The crofter was Chrissie MacCrae who had sheep cows hens and geese. She named all her animals and had 2 geese called Jean and Jim who lived for many years guarding the Croft. Auchtubh has a flood plane which locally is called Loch Occasional. Next to Chrissie’s was a piggery which was a fairly large concern which back then had a distinct smell as the pigs were fed from the left overs from local hotels. Chrissie had the Croft until her death in 1989 and you can still see the Byre where the cows were milked by the side of the road although the grey corrugated iron sheets are now crumbling.

At Auchtubh there is a floodplain which when flooded after heavy rain, is known as "Loch Occasional".
