= Aulden =

Hamlet in Herefordshire, England

Coordinates: 52.18°N 2.79°W

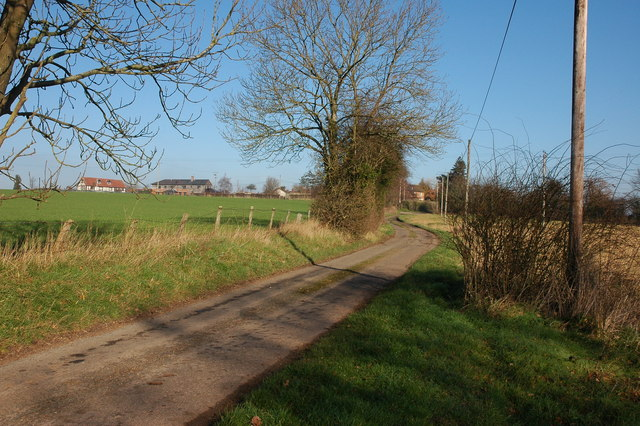
The road to Aulden

Aulden is a hamlet in Herefordshire, England, in Leominster civil parish. It is located about four miles southwest of Leominster, on the road towards Birley.
