= Auldyoch =

Coordinates: 57.463442°N 2.524088°W

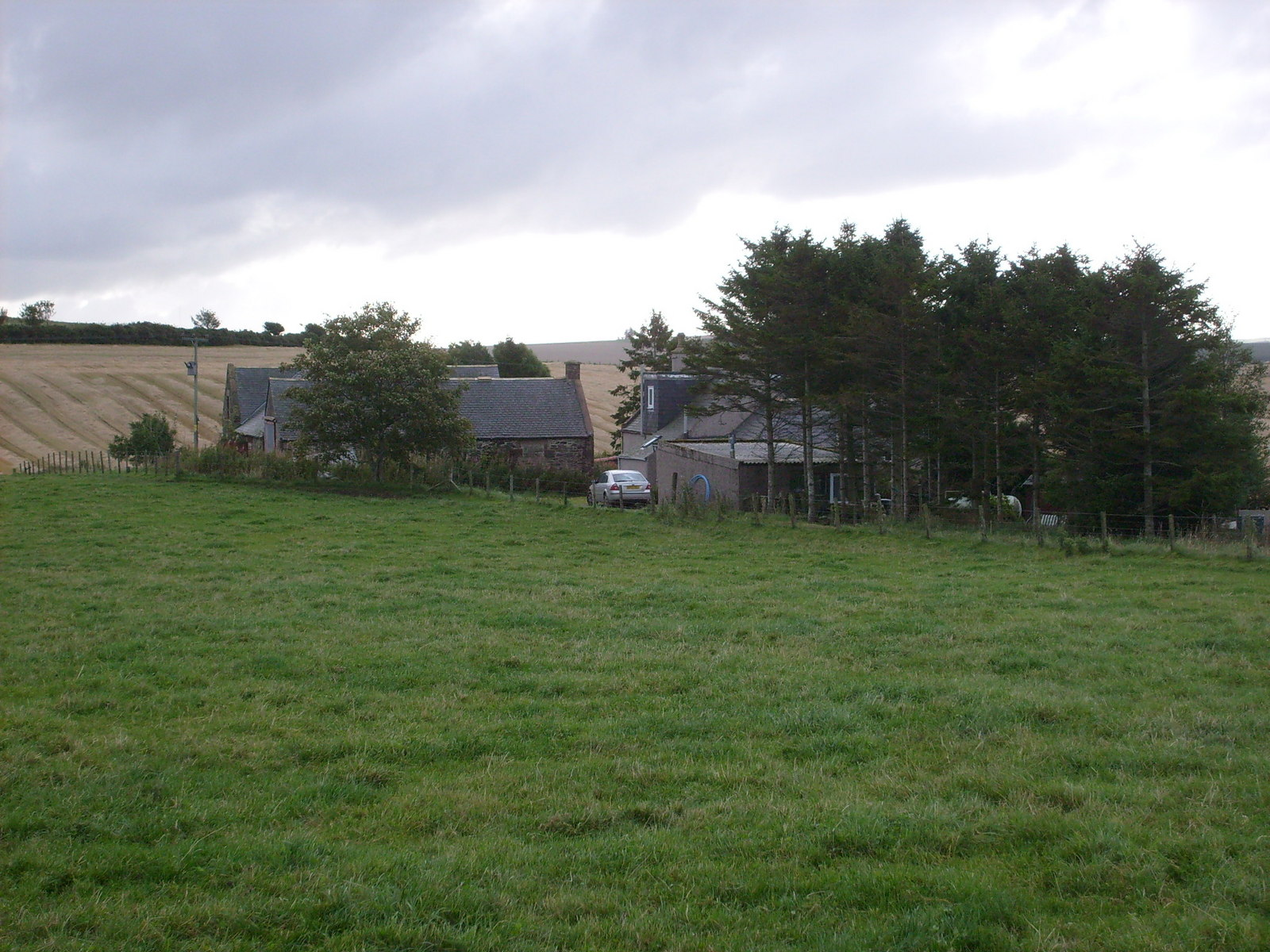
- Auldyoch

- Location within Aberdeenshire
- OS grid reference: NJ6841
- Council area: Aberdeenshire
- Lieutenancy area: Aberdeenshire
- Country: Scotland
- Sovereign state: United Kingdom
- Police: Scotland
- Fire: Scottish
- Ambulance: Scottish

Auldyoch is a hamlet in Aberdeenshire, Scotland.

== History ==
The name "Auldyoch" means "horse burn".
