= William Marischal Astwood =

Bermudian politician

William Marischal Astwood was a member of the Parliament of Bermuda for Warwick East.
