= Atrim =

Village in Dorset, England

Coordinates: 50.75°N 02.79°W

- Location within Dorset
- OS grid reference: SY4495
- Unitary authority: Dorset
- Ceremonial county: Dorset
- Region: South West
- Country: England
- Sovereign state: United Kingdom
- Police: Dorset
- Fire: Dorset and Wiltshire
- Ambulance: South Western
- UK Parliament: West Dorset

Atrim is a small village in Dorset, England, just north of the large town of Bridport. It is situated on the River Simene. The nearest village is Dottery, closely followed by the larger village of Salway Ash. Atrim is made up of a few houses and is very near the famous Monarch's Way.
