= Astrope =

Village in Hertfordshire, England

Coordinates: 51.8245°N 0.6998°W

- Location within Hertfordshire
- OS grid reference: SP892150
- Civil parish: Tring Rural
- District: Dacorum
- Shire county: Hertfordshire
- Region: East
- Country: England
- Sovereign state: United Kingdom
- Post town: Tring
- Postcode district: HP23
- Police: Hertfordshire
- Fire: Hertfordshire
- Ambulance: East of England
- UK Parliament: South West Hertfordshire

Astrope is a village in Hertfordshire, England. It is in the civil parish of Tring Rural.
