= Jeffrey Christopher Astwood =

Bermudan politician (1933–2020)

Jeffrey Christopher Astwood OBE

Member of the Parliament of Bermuda
- In office 1968–1980
- Constituency: Sandys North

Personal details
- Born: Jeffrey Christopher Astwood; March 20, 1933
- Died: May 28, 2020 (aged 87) Somerset, Bermuda
- Party: United Bermuda Party
- Education: Cambridge University
- Occupation: Politician, businessman

Jeffrey "Kit" Christopher Astwood OBE (20 March 1933 – 28 May 2020) was a Bermudian politician who was a member of the Parliament of Bermuda for Sandys North from 1968 to 1980.

== Biography ==
Born into a family active in both politics and horticulture, Astwood was the son of Jeffrey Astwood, a long-serving MP, Cabinet minister and Speaker of the House of Assembly. Educated at Saltus Grammar School and later at Charterhouse in England, he went on to study geography at Cambridge University.

In 1953, Astwood joined a student scientific expedition across North Africa and Ethiopia, and later worked in Hong Kong, where he briefly joined the South China Morning Post and competed in the first Macau Grand Prix.

In 1988, Astwood was appointed an Officer of the Order of the British Empire (OBE) for public service.

Astwood's early business experience stemmed from the family firm, JB Astwood and Sons, founded in 1890, as well as its cycle-rental division, Astwood Cycles Ltd.

Astwood later expanded into consulting and advertising through his firm Capital Consultants, working on projects in Bermuda and abroad. He also served as president of the Bermuda Chamber of Commerce in 1968–69 and remained active in civic initiatives, including the Living Landmark Appeal for the restoration of Hamilton Cathedral.

Astwood was present during the formation of the Association of Bermuda International Companies (ABIC) in 1971, created to represent the rapidly expanding community of overseas firms operating on the island.

Astwood played a central role in the redevelopment of Dockyard, the historic former naval base. As chairman of the West End Development Corporation (Wedco), which he had lobbied the government to establish, he oversaw major restoration and tourism development projects throughout the 1980s. His efforts contributed to transforming the site into a prominent visitor destination, including the opening of the Bermuda Arts Centre in 1984 and the development of the marina, esplanade, cruise terminal and Clocktower Mall.

Astwood served as a Member of the Parliament of Bermuda for Sandys North from 1968 to 1980, representing the United Bermuda Party. He was among the party’s founding members in 1964 and participated in drafting the island’s Constitution ahead of its implementation in 1968.

After five decades of continuous membership, Astwood was awarded a lifetime honorary membership by the Bermuda branch of the Institute of Directors (IoD).

Astwood died on 28 May 2020, in Somerset, Bermuda, aged 87.
