= Atch Lench =

Village in Worcestershire, England

Coordinates: 52.156031°N 1.954622°W

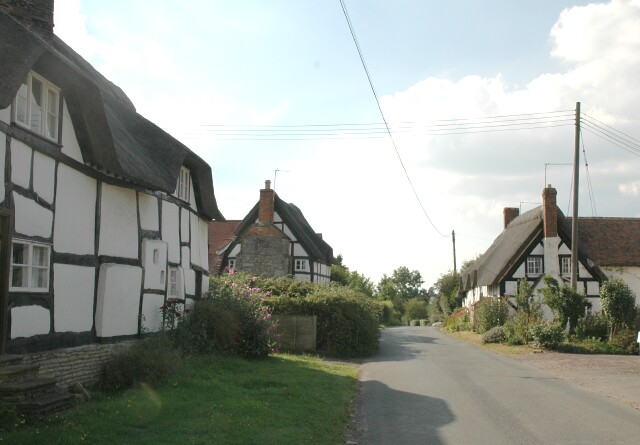

- Location within Worcestershire
- OS grid reference: SP032508
  - London: 91 miles (146 km)
- Civil parish: Church Lench
- District: Wychavon
- Shire county: Worcestershire
- Region: West Midlands
- Country: England
- Sovereign state: United Kingdom
- Post town: EVESHAM
- Postcode district: WR11
- Dialling code: 01386
- Police: West Mercia
- Fire: Hereford and Worcester
- Ambulance: West Midlands

Atch Lench is a village in Worcestershire, England.
