= Ashbank =

Hamlet in Kent, England

Coordinates: 51.2505°N 0.6173°E

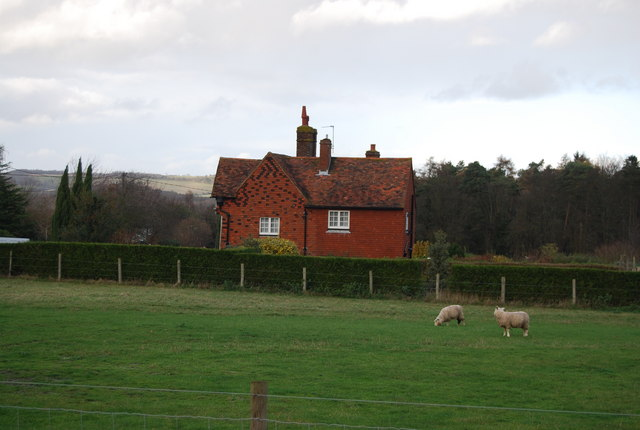
- Cottage at Ashbank

- Location within Kent
- OS grid reference: TQ8253
- Shire county: Kent
- Region: South East
- Country: England
- Sovereign state: United Kingdom
- Post town: Maidstone
- Postcode district: ME17
- Police: Kent
- Fire: Kent
- Ambulance: South East Coast

Ashbank is a hamlet near Leeds in Kent, England.
