= Axtown =

Village in Devon, England

Coordinates: 50.488°N 04.098°W

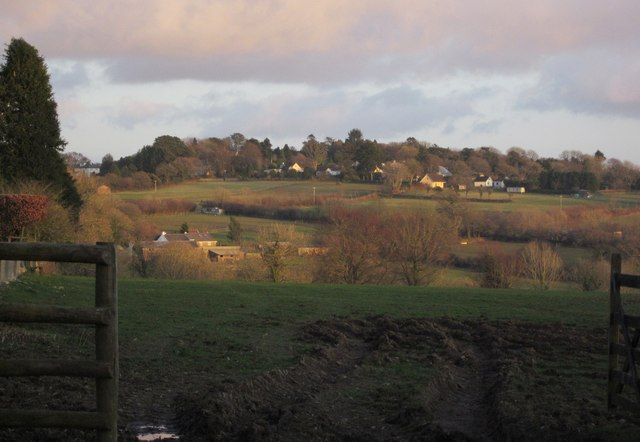
- Axtown from Stoke Hill Lane

- Location within Devon
- OS grid reference: SX5167
- Shire county: Devon
- Region: South West
- Country: England
- Sovereign state: United Kingdom
- Police: Devon and Cornwall
- Fire: Devon and Somerset
- Ambulance: South Western

Axtown is a village in Devon, England.
