= Aston Park =

Aston Park could be

- Aston Park, Birmingham
- Aston Park, Cheshire
- Aston Park, Flintshire
- Aston Park, Dallas
