= Aston (band) =

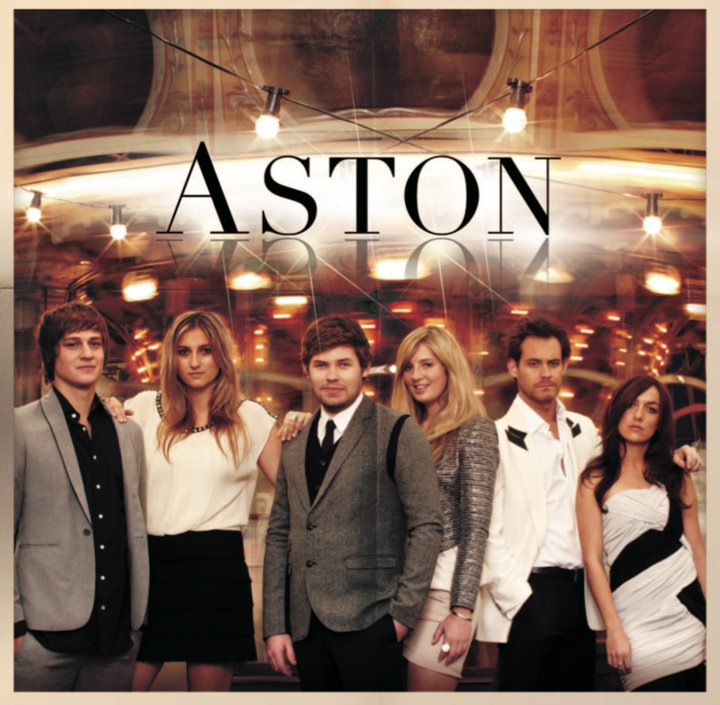
- Aston band members, from left to right: Will Henderson, Hanna Oblikov, Michael Bennet, Eliza Morrison, Daniel Luscombe and Ella Jamieson

Background information
- Origin: Sydney, Australia
- Genres: Classical pop, baroque pop
- Years active: 2009–present
- Label: Warner Music Group
- Members: Eliza Morrison; Michael Bennett; Hanna Oblikov; Will Henderson; Ella Jamieson; Daniel Luscombe
- Website: www.astonmusic.com

Aston is an Australian classical pop group from Sydney formed in 2009. The band consists of members who all have come out of the Sydney Conservatorium of Music: Eliza Morrison (Violin), Michael Bennett (Violin), Hanna Oblikov (Cello), Will Henderson (Guitar), Ella Jamieson (Piano) and Daniel Luscombe (Percussion). Aston was signed to Warner Music Group after uploading an instrumental cover of Lady Gaga's Telephone to YouTube which within a month was viewed by more than 670,000 people. The cover was the most viewed Australian music video of the year. Aston has also received support from celebrity blogger Perez Hilton who featured the band on his website.
