= Auchenhalrig =

Hamlet in Moray, Scotland

Coordinates: 57.64272258805°N 3.0542831889067°W

Auchenhalrig: Scottish Gaelic: Achadh na h-Eilreig
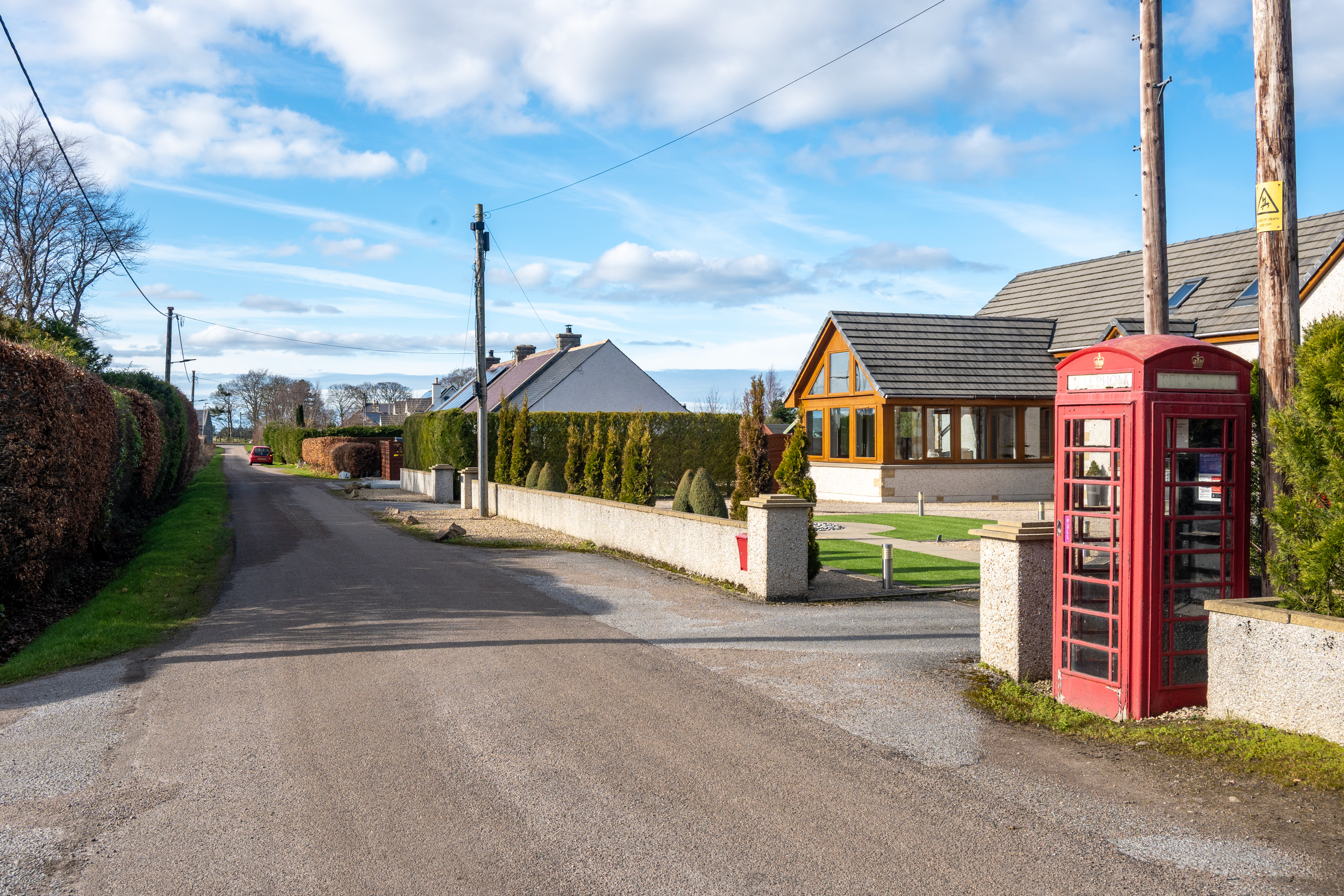

- Location within Moray
- Council area: Moray
- Lieutenancy area: Moray
- Country: Scotland
- Sovereign state: United Kingdom
- Police: Scotland
- Fire: Scottish
- Ambulance: Scottish

Auchenhalrig (Scottish Gaelic: Achadh na h-Eilreig, meaning field of the deer run) is a hamlet in Moray, Scotland located about 3.1 miles (5 kilometres) south-west of Buckie.

The hamlet is known for having a family-run farm produce store.
