= Wickhambrook =

Village in Suffolk, England

Coordinates: 52.170°N 0.551°E

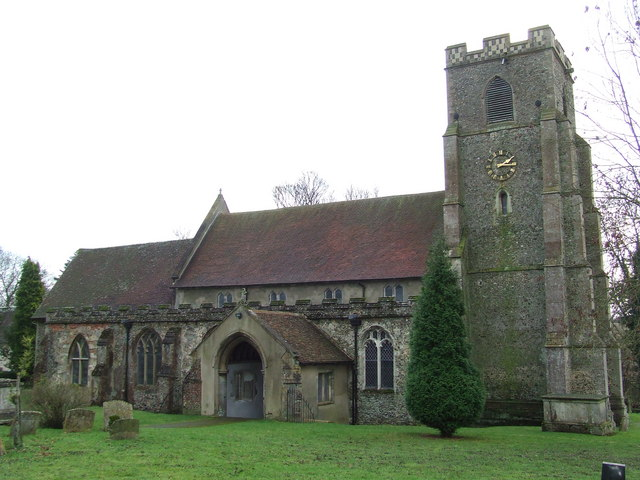
- All Saints church, Wickhambrook

- Location within Suffolk
- Population: 1,170 (2005)
- OS grid reference: TL746555
- District: West Suffolk
- Shire county: Suffolk
- Region: East
- Country: England
- Sovereign state: United Kingdom
- Post town: Newmarket
- Postcode district: CB8
- Police: Suffolk
- Fire: Suffolk
- Ambulance: East of England
- UK Parliament: West Suffolk

Wickhambrook is a village and civil parish in the West Suffolk district of Suffolk in eastern England. It is about ten miles (16 km) south-west from Bury St Edmunds, halfway to Haverhill, off the A143 road. Wickhambrook is the largest village by area in the county of Suffolk with a population of 1170 in 2005.

The village was recorded in Domesday Book as "Wicham".

== Settlements ==
The parish contains a number of hamlets and eleven village greens:

- Ashfield Green
- Attleton Green
- Baxter's Green
- Boyden End
- Clopton Green
- Coltsfoot Green
- Farley Green
- Genesis Green
- Lady's Green
- Malting End
- Meeting Green
- Moor Green
- Nunnery Green
- Park Gate
- Wickham Street

spread over a 6.5 square mile area.

In 2011 St Edmundsbury Borough Council announced that Wickhambrook is to lose one of its Greens. Lady's Green is to become part of Ousden. The date of this change is still to be determined, as it is under review.

The village has three places of worship: All Saints' Church – Anglican (OS grid TL7554) on Church Road near the B1063 road; the United Reformed Church, at Meeting Green on Cemetery Road; and the Methodist Chapel at the intersection of Shop Hill (B1063) and Cemetery Road. In former times there was a Free Chapel in the grounds of Badmondisfield Hall; its date of closure is unrecorded.

There are three formal burial sites in the village: the original churchyard of All Saints', which was closed by an Order in Council in 1890 (except that in 1934 George V made an Order allowing the burial of Alexander McKechnie, Vicar of Wickhambrook); a small number of burial plots in the grounds of the United Reformed Church; and finally the cemetery to be found on Cemetery Road which also hosts a small chapel and the village war memorial.

Bullock's Mill was a post mill built at Thorns about 1830. It was demolished about 1914; some remains can be seen. Another mill stood on the road towards Hargrave until 1920. A third mill dating from the 18th century, stood in the south of the parish near Denston until 1969.

== Present day ==
Wickhambrook (centre – OS grid TL7455) hosts a number of facilities.

- A Post office/shop, garage.
- Wickhambrook Surgery, Nunnery Green, Wickhambrook, Suffolk CB8 8XU
- The Greyhound pub, (Lidstone's brewed here between 1998 and 2002 but since moved to Yorkshire).
- Memorial Hall hosts a very active social scene, including an excellent pantomime which is normally held around January of each year.
- Women's Institutes WI Hall is not as large, but has social events.
- Wickhambrook Community Primary School is at the north end of Shop Hill.
- Three centres of worship and burial
- The Six Acres recreational ground
- Playground and skateboard park
- Fire station

Farms in the area include Brookhouse Farm just off A143 and Rolfes Farm further north as well as Gesyns Farm, Badmondisfield Hall and ancient manor house thought to date back to Domesday Book is also situated on the outskirts of the village.

Alf Hicks' biscuit barrel award is awarded each year for outstanding service to the village.

== See also ==
- List of dissenting academies (1660–1800)
