= Ashmansworthy =

Village in Devon, England

Coordinates: 50.93°N 04.37°W

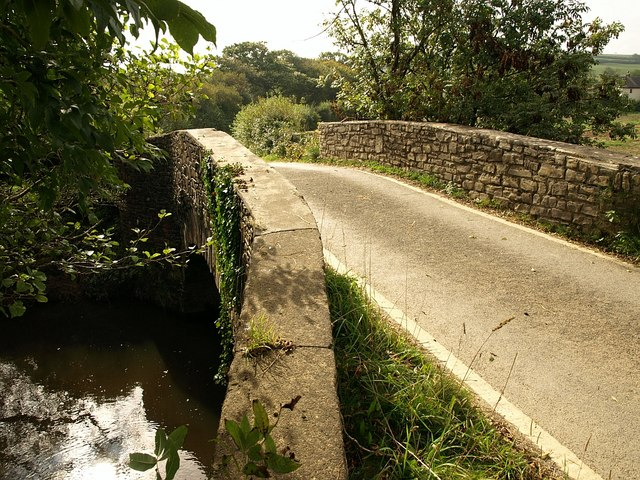
- Ashmansworthy Bridge over the River Torridge

- Location within Devon
- OS grid reference: SS3318
- Shire county: Devon
- Region: South West
- Country: England
- Sovereign state: United Kingdom
- Police: Devon and Cornwall
- Fire: Devon and Somerset
- Ambulance: South Western

Ashmansworthy is a village in Devon, England. Recorded in the Domesday Book, it was in the hundred of Hartland.
