= Auchinleish =

Coordinates: 56.727411°N 3.315533°W

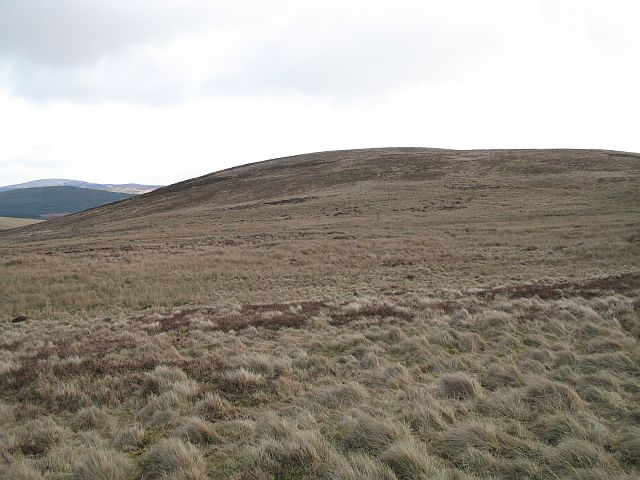

- Location within Angus
- OS grid reference: NO196603
- Council area: Angus
- Lieutenancy area: Angus
- Country: Scotland
- Sovereign state: United Kingdom
- Police: Scotland
- Fire: Scottish
- Ambulance: Scottish

Auchinleish is a village in Angus, Scotland.
