= Auchnarrow =

Coordinates: 57.29°N 03.31°W

Auchnarrow: Scottish Gaelic: Achadh an Arbha
- Location within Moray
- OS grid reference: NJ2123
- Council area: Moray
- Lieutenancy area: Banffshire
- Country: Scotland
- Sovereign state: United Kingdom
- Police: Scotland
- Fire: Scottish
- Ambulance: Scottish

Auchnarrow (Scottish Gaelic: Achadh an Arbha) is a village in Moray, Scotland.
