= Ashfield, Argyll and Bute =

Coordinates: 56.010°N 05.586°W

Ashfield
- Location within Argyll and Bute
- OS grid reference: NR765854
- Council area: Argyll and Bute
- Country: Scotland
- Sovereign state: United Kingdom
- Police: Scotland
- Fire: Scottish
- Ambulance: Scottish

Ashfield is a village in the civil parish of North Knapdale, in Knapdale, in the council area of Argyll and Bute, Scotland. It has a sheep farm and cottage and once had a school.

== History ==
The name "Ashfield" is Gaelic and means "the ash slope".
