= Auchlyne =

Coordinates: 56.433°N 4.416°W

Auchlyne: Scottish Gaelic: Achadh Loinne
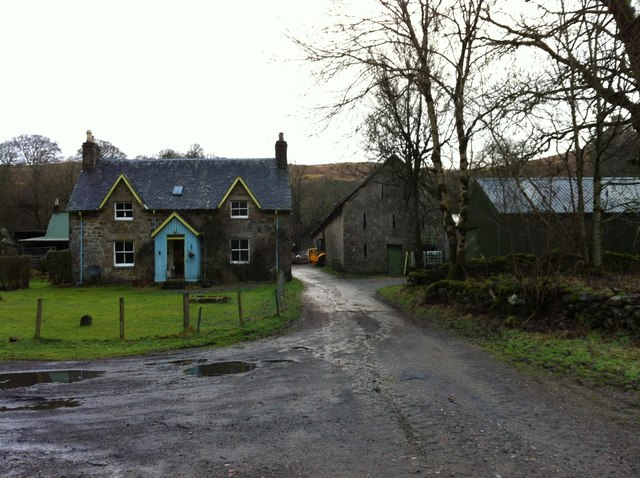
- Auchlyne Farm

- Location within the Stirling council area
- OS grid reference: NN511294
- Civil parish: Killin
- Council area: Stirling
- Lieutenancy area: Stirling and Falkirk
- Country: Scotland
- Sovereign state: United Kingdom
- Post town: KILLIN
- Postcode district: FK21
- Dialling code: 01567
- Police: Scotland
- Fire: Scottish
- Ambulance: Scottish
- UK Parliament: Stirling and Strathallan
- Scottish Parliament: Stirling

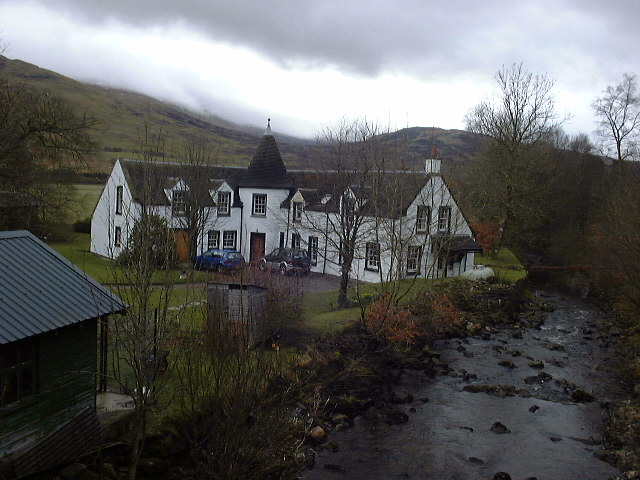
Barncroft of Auchlyne

Auchlyne (Scottish Gaelic: Achadh Loinne) is a small hamlet in Stirling, Scotland. It is located approximately five miles west of Killin on Loch Tay, off the main A85 road that runs from Perth to Oban.

It consists of 3 houses, a large mansion house (complete with adjoining servants quarters, walled garden and kennels) and a farm, and has 10 permanent residents.

There is also an Auchlyne in Guyana. It is unknown if there is any direct link. It is likely that Auchlyne, Guyana was named by a Scot, since Auchlyne is a typical Gaelic-derived name. There is also an Auchlyne Estate, which is governed by the Scottish Congregational Church.

== Toponymy ==
The name "Auchlyne" comes from the Gaelic Achadh Loinne. Achadh means "field", whereas Loinne may mean "stack-yard" (in Perthshire Gaelic) or "in good condition / appearance". Historically, the name may have been "Achline" or "Auchlin".

== Location ==
Auchlyne is located on the North side of Glen Dochart where the flat river plain gives way to the Breadalbane Hills. It is bracketed by the West Auchlyne Burn to the west and the East Auchlyne Burn to the east. Auchlyne is in Breadalbane, from the Gaelic Bràid Albainn or Bràghad Albainn, meaning "the upper part of Alba or Scotland".

Nearby settlements are Auchessan (Achadh an Easan, possibly "the field with the little waterfall"), Ardchyle (Ard Choille, meaning "high wood"), 1867 Map, Liangarstan, Ledcharrie (image, with Innishewan in the distance), Croftchoes, Suie (meaning "seat"), Luib (meaning "bend"; the River Dochart does make an S-bend below Luib), Bovain (Both Mheadhain, meaning "the middle hut", lying as it does near halfway between Auchlyne and Killin. From the 14th century, Bovain was the seat of the Chief of the Clan MacNab) and Leskine. A right of way leads from Ledcharrie over the hill to Balquhidder, seat of the Clan MacLaren and home to Rob Roy MacGregor. At the foot of Ben More, near Auchessan is a cottage which supposedly belonged to Rob Roy MacGregor.

The two burns that enclose Auchlyne are part of the Killin section of the Breadalbane Hydro-Electric Scheme, which takes almost the entire runoff from the East and West Auchlyne burn catchment areas and transports it to Loch Lyon, two glens to the North of Glen Dochart, through a system of submerged pipes and tunnels through the hillside. A road was created from Auchlyne to allow access to the many small dams that feed the system, and also to enable heavier machinery to gain access to the south end of the tunnel that carries the water through the mountain to Glen Lochy. This scheme was completed in 1961. The Hydroboard were granted permission to create the road by the owners of the estate, in return for free use of the road by the estate.

== History ==
The mansion house, built by the Third Earl of Breadalbane, from whom it could be rented, dates from 1760. In the fields below Auchlyne Farm are the ruins of a chapel, which is also marked as a burial ground on Ordnance Survey maps. There is also a burial ground site on a mound below Suie. There are numerous disused and ruined croft buildings in the hills and moors around Auchlyne.

Of the three houses in Auchlyne, one, the Old Keepers cottage, has been extensively extended and remodelled since its current owner, the owner of Auchlyne Estate, moved in over 30 years ago. The Old Keepers cottage can be seen in its original guise in one of the St Andrews University Archive pictures. The remaining two houses are modern bungalows, one of which is home to current keeper.

In 1824, the estate caught the eye of Sir Humphry Davy the chemist. The Royal Institution of Great Britain retain a letter copied by his brother John Davy in which Humphry expressed his interest in the estate.

Papers in the National Archives suggest that Auchlyne was one of over thirty properties either owned or leased by the Grenville family, Dukes of Buckingham, who evidently commissioned a household inventory and valuation in 1847, which is retained by the National Archives of Scotland. There is also reference to Auchlyne in an item in a catalogue of 1848, which details the receipt by the Dukes of Buckingham and Chandos, under the title "Marquis of Chandos", of a powder flask and shot-belt from some "obliged friends" in August 1837, no doubt after a days grouse shooting on or after the Glorious Twelfth. These dates suggest that the 1847 inventory and valuation was in preparation for the 1848 sale. The sale was necessary due to the combined extravagances and follies of the first and second Dukes.

Auchlyne House was rented in 1858 by "The Black Prince", as the Perthshire locals called Maharajah Duleep Singh, the first Indian prince to visit Scotland. His father was Ranjit Singh, the legendary Lion of the Punjab, who ruled the Sikh kingdom in India. He took Auchlyne from Lord Breadalbane when his lease of Castle Menzies expired, but in 1860 moved to England.

The mansion house on the Breadalbane Estate was rented by Mr John M. Crabbie, of Crabbie's Green Ginger fame, in 1888. It was rented later, in 1893, by John Crabbie's son, a Captain Crabbe. The discrepancy in the surnames arose because Captain Crabbe had to change his name after being blackballed from the New Club in Edinburgh because his family were in trade. The Crabbe family bought the property and have lived there since.

Breadalbane, the region in which Auchlyne is located, was home to the Campbells of Breadalbane.

== Auchlyne and Suie Estates ==
Auchlyne and Suie Estates run to just over 18,000 acres (73 km^{2}), 10,611 acres (43 km^{2}) and 7500 acres (30 km^{2}) respectively) and stretch from Killin to Auchessan on the north side of Glen Dochart (Auchlyne Estate), and from Liangarstan to Ben More on the south side (Suie Estate). It operates both agricultural and sporting operations. On the farming side, there are Blackface and Cheviot flocks, as well as a herd of pedigree Highland cattle, the Benmore Fold, based at Innishewan Farm. On the sporting side, the estate offers red deer stalking, trout and salmon fishing and walked-up red grouse shooting. The remains of the driven grouse butts can still be seen on Auchlyne.

The family still lives in the mansion house at Auchlyne and runs the estate to this day.
