= Ashill, Devon =

Village in Devon, England

Coordinates: 50.89°N 03.30°W

Ashill
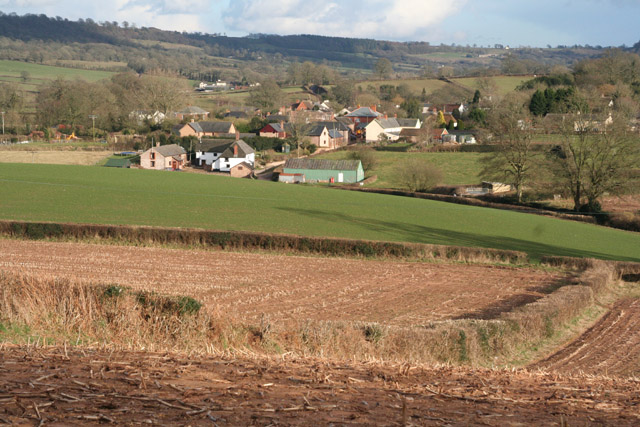

- Location within Devon
- OS grid reference: ST0811
- District: Mid Devon
- Shire county: Devon
- Region: South West
- Country: England
- Sovereign state: United Kingdom
- Post town: CULLOMPTON
- Postcode district: EX15
- Dialling code: 01884
- Police: Devon and Cornwall
- Fire: Devon and Somerset
- Ambulance: South Western

Ashill is a village located in the parish of Uffculme, in the English county of Devon. It has a small church, a community village hall and small public house.

In the early 20th Century it had one or two shops, plus beer and cider houses. Later came a small garage with petrol pump, and a post office. None of these now survive. Towards the end of the century the character of the village changed, moving from a predominantly farming community to more of a residential character, with several new homes and a mini-estate and starter-home development built during the 1980s and 1990s. Nevertheless, a few historic farms remain active into the early 21st century, along with the more recently arrived alpaca breeders.

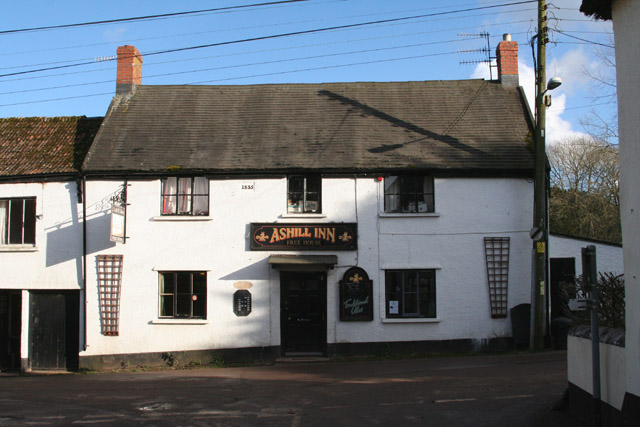
Ashill Inn

St. Stephen's Church is part of the parish of St. Mary's, Uffculme. Ashill Inn was built in 1835.

One of the more visible features is a 3-storey Victorian red-brick dwelling at the lower end of the village. Legend has it that it began life as a 2-storey building (which would have been rather more in keeping with the character of the rest of the village), but during its construction the woman to whom the new owner was betrothed left him, and in order to win her back the man tried to impress her by commissioning an extra storey to his new home, thus assuring her of a greater status as the wife of a 'property owner'. As the story goes, he was unsuccessful in this, and she never returned to him.

Ashill lies approximately two miles from Uffculme and Kentisbeare.

It was soul/R&B singer Joss Stone's teenage home (specifically, the hamlet of Rull, approximately half a mile away).
