= Ashfields =

English village

Coordinates: 52.835°N 2.443°W

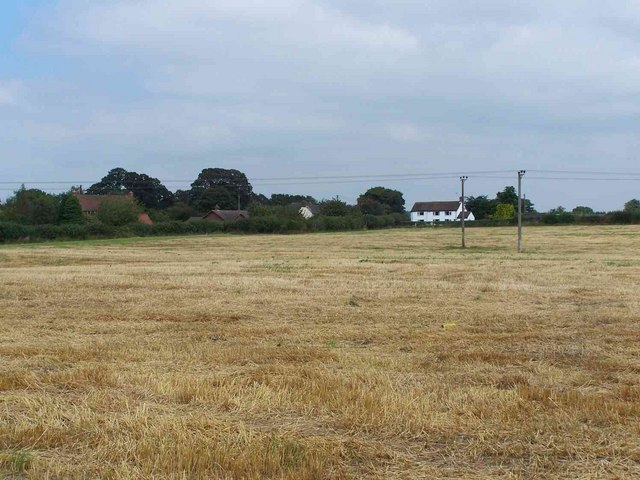
- Ashfields

- Location within Shropshire
- OS grid reference: SJ701265
- Civil parish: Hinstock
- Unitary authority: Shropshire
- Ceremonial county: Shropshire
- Region: West Midlands
- Country: England
- Sovereign state: United Kingdom
- Post town: MARKET DRAYTON
- Postcode district: TF9
- Dialling code: 01952
- Police: West Mercia
- Fire: Shropshire
- Ambulance: West Midlands
- UK Parliament: North Shropshire

Ashfields is a village in Shropshire, England.
