= Aston, Stafford =

Hamlet in Staffordshire, England

Coordinates: 52.80°N 02.16°W

Aston
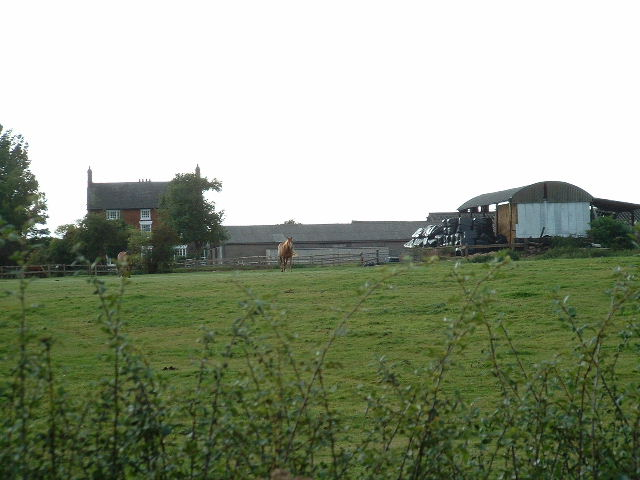
- Aston Hill Farm

- Location within Staffordshire
- OS grid reference: SJ8923
- Civil parish: Seighford
- Shire county: Staffordshire
- Region: West Midlands
- Country: England
- Sovereign state: United Kingdom
- Police: Staffordshire
- Fire: Staffordshire
- Ambulance: West Midlands

Aston is a hamlet in the county of Staffordshire, England. In 1086 Aston was recorded in the Domesday Book as Estone.
