= Attleton Green =

Hamlet in Suffolk, England

Coordinates: 52.15°N 00.54°E

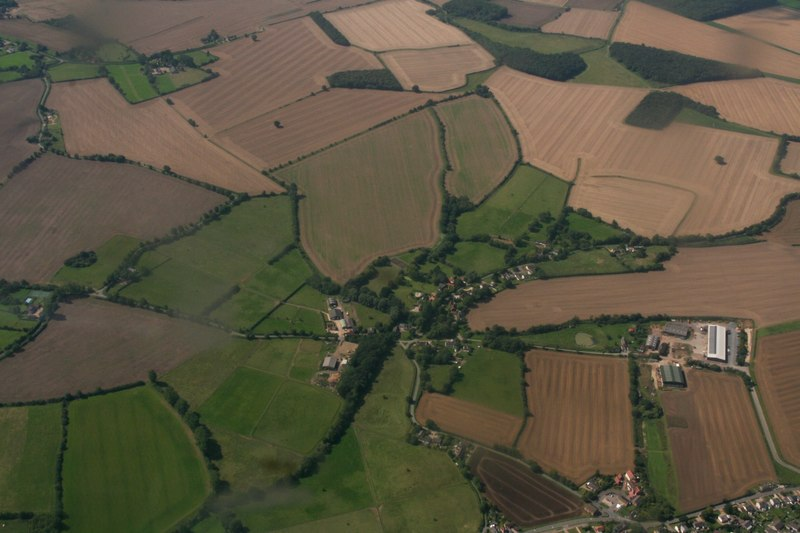
- Aerial photograph, August 2017

- Location within Suffolk
- OS grid reference: TL7454
- Shire county: Suffolk
- Region: East
- Country: England
- Sovereign state: United Kingdom
- Police: Suffolk
- Fire: Suffolk
- Ambulance: East of England

Attleton Green is a hamlet in Suffolk, England. It is part of the Whepstead & Wickhambrook Electoral division of West Suffolk District.

Attleton Green Farmhouse is a 17th-century timber-framed house which is a Grade II listed building.
