= Ashill, Cornwall =

Hamlet in Cornwall, England

Coordinates: 50.229°N 5.342°W

Ashill
- Location within Cornwall
- OS grid reference: SW617419
- Shire county: Cornwall
- Region: South West
- Country: England
- Sovereign state: United Kingdom
- Police: Devon and Cornwall
- Fire: Cornwall
- Ambulance: South Western

Ashill is a small hamlet in west Cornwall, England, United Kingdom in the valley of the Red River about 2 miles north west of Camborne. The Red River Nature reserve lies east of the hamlet.
