= Ashfield Green, Mid Suffolk =

Coordinates: 52.313953°N 1.314728°E

Ashfield Green
- Location within Suffolk
- District: Mid Suffolk
- Shire county: Suffolk
- Region: East
- Country: England
- Sovereign state: United Kingdom

Ashfield Green is a hamlet near Stradbroke, Suffolk, England.
