= Ashfield, Stirling =

Coordinates: 56.2103°N 3.9620°W

Ashfield: Scottish Gaelic: Achadh an Uinnsinn
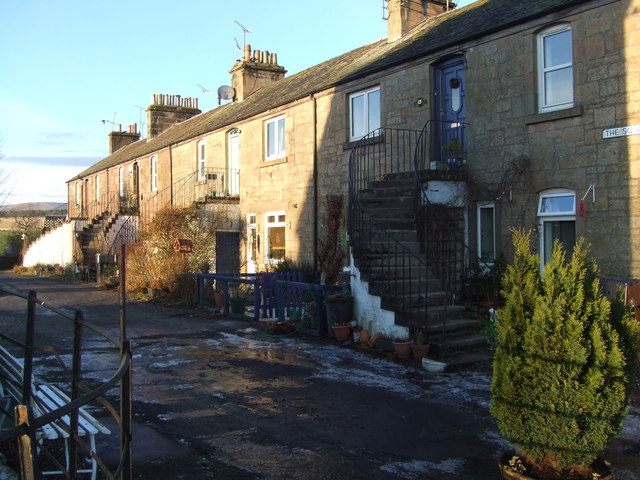
- The Square, Ashfield

- Location within the Stirling council area
- Population: 139
- OS grid reference: NN784037
- Civil parish: Dunblane and Lecropt
- Council area: Stirling
- Lieutenancy area: Stirling and Falkirk
- Country: Scotland
- Sovereign state: United Kingdom
- Post town: Dunblane
- Postcode district: FK15
- Dialling code: 01786
- Police: Scotland
- Fire: Scottish
- Ambulance: Scottish
- UK Parliament: Stirling and Strathallan
- Scottish Parliament: Clackmannanshire and Dunblane

Ashfield (Scottish Gaelic: Achadh an Uinnsinn) is a small village in the Registration county of Perth and the local government district of Stirling, Scotland. It lies between the Allan Water and the Stirling-Perth Railway line. It is two miles north of Dunblane, and was designated a conservation village in 1976. It was originally built to house workers at a nearby silk-dyeing mill. Prior to this, a mill, Millash or Mill of Ash, existed, as did an extensive house or farm. Ashfield has four residential streets (Ochilview, Allanview, The Steading and The Cottages), a residential block (The Clachan) and also a square, named after the former prime minister William Gladstone, called Gladstone Square.

There are various annual activities based in the village hall such as a Blues festival, a Food festival and a Music festival.
