= Ashton (surname) =

Ashton is a surname. Notable people with the surname include:

== Notable people with the surname "Ashton" include ==
=== A ===
- Alan Ashton (disambiguation), multiple people
- Al Hunter Ashton (1957–2007), English actor
- Algernon Ashton (1859–1937), British composer
- Andrew Ashton (born 1971), English book designer

=== B ===
- Bill Ashton (disambiguation), multiple people
- Brent Ashton (born 1960), Canadian ice hockey player
- Brian Ashton (disambiguation), multiple people

=== C ===
- Camille Ashton (born 1990), American soccer player
- Carter Ashton (born 1991), Canadian ice hockey player
- Catherine Ashton (born 1956), British politician
- Chad Ashton (born 1967), American soccer player
- Charles Ashton (disambiguation), multiple people
- Charlotte Ashton, British television presenter
- Chris Ashton (born 1987), English rugby league footballer
- Claude Ashton (1901–1942), English cricketer and footballer
- Collin Ashton (born 1983), American football player
- Cyril Ashton (born 1942), English Anglican bishop

=== D ===
- Dan Ashton (born 1954), Canadian politician
- David Ashton (disambiguation), multiple people
- Dean Ashton (born 1983), English footballer
- Derek Ashton (1922–1997), English footballer
- Diana Ashton (born 1955), British swimmer
- Donald M. Ashton (1919–2004), English art director
- Dore Ashton (1928–2017), American art critic and writer

=== E ===
- Edward Ashton (disambiguation), multiple people
- Edwin Ashton (1893–1970), English footballer
- Eliza Ashton (1851/1852–1900), English-Australian journalist and social reformer
- Elizabeth Ashton (born 1950), Canadian equestrian
- Ellis Ashton (1919–1985), English comedian
- Eric Ashton (1935–2008), English rugby league footballer
- Ernest Charles Ashton (1873–1957), Canadian soldier
- Ernie Ashton (1883–1955), Australian rules footballer
- Ethel V. Ashton (1896–1975), American artist

=== F ===
- Ferris Ashton (1926–2013), Australian rugby league footballer
- Francis Leslie Ashton (1904–1994), English writer
- Fred Ashton (1931–2013), American politician
- Frederick Ashton (1904–1988), English dancer and choreographer

=== G ===
- Gilbert Ashton (1896–1981), English cricketer
- Graham Ashton (born 1962), Australian police officer
- Graham Ashton (trumpeter), British-American musician
- Gwyn Ashton (born 1960), Welsh-Australian guitarist

=== H ===
- Heather Ashton (1929–2019), British psychopharmacologist
- Helen Ashton (1891–1958), British novelist
- Henry Ashton (disambiguation), multiple people
- Herbert Ashton (1885–1927), English footballer
- Hubert Ashton (1898–1979), English cricketer
- Hugh Ashton (died 1522), English churchman
- Hugh C. S. Ashton (fl. ca. 1920), British polo player

=== J ===
- Jack Ashton, British actor
- James Ashton (disambiguation), multiple people
- Jayne Ashton (born 1957), English squash player
- Jennifer Ashton (born 1969), American physician
- Jim Ashton (1891–1961), Australian rules footballer
- Joey Matenga Ashton (1907–1993), New Zealand railway worker
- John Ashton (disambiguation), multiple people
- Jon Ashton (born 1982), English footballer
- Joseph Ashton (disambiguation), multiple people
- Josh Ashton (1949–1993), American football player
- Juli Ashton (born 1969), American pornographic actress
- Julian Ashton (1851–1942), English-Australian artist
- Julian Howard Ashton (1877–1964), English-Australian journalist

=== K ===
- Kalinda Ashton, Australian writer
- Ken Ashton (1925–2002), British journalist and trade union leader
- Kevin Ashton (born 1968), British technology pioneer
- Kimberley Ashton (born 1987), Jèrriais cyclist and badminton player

=== L ===
- Laura Ashton, Canadian businesswoman
- Leah Ashton, Australian novelist
- Leigh Ashton (born 1956), English-South African musician
- Leigh Ashton (museum director) (1897–1983), British art historian
- Leonard Ashton (1915–2001), English bishop
- Leslie Ashton (1986–2012), American singer
- Lisa Ashton (born 1970), English darts player
- Lorin Ashton (born 1978), American musician
- Lyn Ashton (born 1951), American canoeist

=== M ===
- Malcolm Ashton, English statistician
- Marcia Ashton (born 1932), British actress
- Margaret Ashton (1856–1937), English politician
- Mark Ashton (1960–1987), British activist
- Mark Ashton (musician) (born 1949), British musician
- Martyn Ashton (born 1974), British biker
- Marvin Ashton (disambiguation), multiple people
- Matthew Ashton (born 1988), American poker player
- Matty Ashton (born 1998), English rugby league footballer
- Michael Ashton (born 1982), New Zealand makeup artist

=== N ===
- Nathan Ashton (born 1987), English footballer
- Neil Ashton (born 1985), English footballer and football manager
- N. H. Ashton (1913–2000), British ophthalmologist
- Nicholas Ashton (1904–1986), English cricketer
- Nigel J. Ashton, English history professor
- Niki Ashton (born 1982), Canadian politician

=== P ===
- Pat Ashton (1931–2013), English actress
- Percy Ashton (1895–1934), English cricketer
- Percy Ashton (footballer) (1909–1985), English footballer
- Peter Ashton (disambiguation), multiple people
- Philip Ashton (1702–1746), English castaway
- Philip Ashton (cricketer) (born 1988), English cricketer

=== Q ===
- Queenie Ashton (1903–1999), English actress

=== R ===
- Ray Ashton (born 1960), English rugby league footballer
- Raymond J. Ashton (1887–1973), American architect
- Richard Ashton (born 1963), English cricketer
- Robert Ashton (disambiguation), multiple people
- Robin Ashton, American civil servant
- Ron Ashton (born 1954), Canadian ice hockey player
- Roger Ashton (??–1592), English soldier
- Rosemary Ashton (born 1947), Scottish literary scholar
- Roy Ashton (1909–1995), Australian musician
- Ruth Ashton Taylor (1922–2024), American newscaster
- Ryan Ashton (born 1984), American actor

=== S ===
- Sam Ashton (born 1986), English footballer
- Steve Ashton (born 1956), British-born Canadian politician
- Susan Ashton (born 1967), American musician
- Sylvia Ashton (1880–1940), American actress

=== T ===
- Teddy Ashton (1906–1978), English footballer
- Thomas Ashton (disambiguation), multiple people
- Toni Ashton, New Zealand health economist
- Tony Ashton (1946–2001), English musician
- T. S. Ashton (1889–1968), English historian

=== W ===
- Wendell J. Ashton (1912–1995), American publisher
- Will Ashton (1881–1963), British-Australian artist and art director
- William Ashton (disambiguation), multiple people
- W. P. B. Ashton (1897–1981), British army officer

=== Z ===
- Zach Ashton, American musician
- Zawe Ashton (born 1984), British actress

== See also ==
- Ashton (given name), a page for people with the given name "Ashton"
- Ashton (disambiguation), a disambiguation page for "Ashton"
