= Harry Aston =

Harry Aston may refer to:

- Harry Aston (footballer, born 1855) (1855–1914), English footballer who scored the first recorded goal of West Bromwich Albion
- Harry Aston (footballer, born 1881) (1881–1938), English footballer

== See also ==
- Harry Ashton (disambiguation)
- Henry Aston (1759–1798), English cricketer
