= Ashton (given name) =

- Pronunciation: /ˈæʃtən/
- Gender: Male
- Language: English

Origin
- Language: Old English
- Origin: Ashton (surname)
- Meaning: "ash tree town"
- Region of origin: England

Other names
- Variant forms: Ashten; Ashtyn; Ashtin
- Nicknames: Ash, Ashy, Asher

Ashton is a male name of English origin. It is derived from the surname, itself a place name meaning "ash tree town".

The name is in use for both boys and girls in the United States. Ashton was used far more often for American females from 1986 until 1997. The popularity for girls was from the Terri Garber character "Ashton Main" on 1985's North and South TV miniseries. Since Ashton Kutcher's debut on television and film in the late 1990s, the name is now in favor more for boys, as it was always before 1986. Ashton was the 124th most popular name for American boys born in 2007. It was the 778th most popular name for American girls in 2005, the last year it was ranked among the top 1,000 names. Ashton was ranked among the top 100 names for boys in England and Wales in 2007 and in British Columbia, Canada and New South Wales, Australia in 2005 and 2006.

Popular nicknames include Ash and Ashy.

== People with the given name "Ashton" include ==
- Ashton Agar (born 1993), Australian cricketer
- Ashton Applewhite (born 1952), American writer
- Ashton Aylworth (died 1602), English politician
- Ashton Baumann (born 1993), Canadian swimmer
- Ashton Bell (born 1999), Canadian ice hockey player
- Ashton Bennett (born 1988), Jamaican footballer
- Ashton Bethel-Roman (born 2005), American college football wide receiver
- Ashton Calvert (1945–2007), Australian public servant
- Ashton Carter (1954–2022), American physicist and politician
- Ashton Nicole Casey (born 1996), American rapper, singer, and songwriter
- Ashton Chen (born 1988), Chinese actor
- Ashton Clemmons (born 1983), American politician
- Ashton B. Collins Sr. (1885–1976), American inventor
- Ashton Constant (born 1983), South African rugby union footballer
- Ashton Dovell (1885–1949), American politician
- Ashton Dulin (born 1997), American football player
- Ashton Eaton (born 1988), American decathlete
- Ashton Edwards, American ballet dancer
- Ashton F. Embry (born 1946), Canadian scientist
- Ashton Galpin (born 1950), South African cricketer
- Ashton Gibbs (born 1990), American basketball player
- Ashton Gillotte (born 2002), American football player
- Ashton Golding (born 1996), Jamaican rugby league footballer
- Ashton Götz (born 1993), German footballer
- Ashton Goudeau (born 1992), American baseball player
- Ashton Griffin (born 1989), American poker player
- Ashton Hagans (born 1999), American basketball player
- Ashton Hampton (born 2006), American football player
- Ashton Hams (born 1986), Australian rules footballer
- Ashton Hawkins (1937–2022), American lawyer
- Ashton Hayward (born 1969), American politician and real estate developer
- Ashton Hermes (born 2010), British-American music critic
- Ashton Hewitt (born 1994), Welsh rugby union footballer
- Ashton Higgins (born 2002), American stock car racing driver
- Ashton Hill (born 1995), Australian rules footballer
- Ashton Holmes (born 1978), American actor
- Ashton Hurn (born 1990/1991), Australian politician
- Ashton Irwin (born 1994), Australian musician
- Ashton Jeanty (born 2003), American football player
- Ashton Jones (1896–1979), American minister
- Ashton Kutcher (born 1978), American actor
- Ashton Lambie (born 1990), American cyclist
- Ashton Lewis Jr. (born 1972), American stock car racing
- Ashton Lever (1729–1788), English collector
- Ashton Lister (1845–1929), British politician
- Ashton Locklear (born 1998), American gymnast
- Ashton Michael (born 1982), American fashion designer
- Ashton Mitchell (born 1988), American basketball player
- Ashton Nicholas Every Mosley (1792–1875), English sheriff
- Ashton Nichols (born 1953), American professor
- Ashton Nyte, South African singer
- Ashton Oxenden (1808–1892), Canadian bishop
- Ashton Pankey (born 1992), American basketball player
- Ashton Rome (born 1985), Canadian ice hockey player
- Ashton Roskill (1902–1992), British judge
- Ashton C. Shallenberger (1862–1938), American politician
- Ashton Sanborn (1882–1970), American archaeologist
- Ashton Sanders (born 1995), American actor
- Ashton Sautner (born 1994), Canadian ice hockey player
- Ashton Shepherd (born 1986), American singer-songwriter
- Ashton Sims (born 1985), Fijian rugby league footballer
- Ashton Skrlik (born 1999), Canadian curler
- Ashton Smith (born 1962), American voice actor
- Ashton Smith (wrestler) (born 1988), English professional wrestler
- Ashton Stamps (born 2005), American football player
- Ashton Stevens (1872–1951), American journalist
- Ashton Turner (born 1993), Australian cricketer
- Ashton Wade (1898–1996), British army officer
- Ashton Hilliard Williams (1891–1962), American judge
- Ashton Youboty (born 1984), Liberian player of American football
- Ashton Chen Yong Zhao (born 1989), Singaporean badminton player

== See also ==
- Ashton (surname)
- Ashton (disambiguation)
- Ashten Prechtel, American basketball player
- Ashten Regan, Scottish politician
- Ashtin Zamzow-Mahler, American track and field athlete
- Ashtyn Davis, American professional football player
