= Asheton =

Asheton is a surname. Notable people with the surname include:

- Ron Asheton (1948–2009), American guitarist
- Scott Asheton (1949–2014), American drummer

== See also ==
- Ashton (disambiguation)
