= James Ashton =

James Ashton may refer to:

- James Ashton (artist) (1859–1935), artist and arts educator in South Australia
- James Ashton (politician) (1864–1939), Australian politician
- James Ashton (Royal Navy officer) (1883–1951)
- James Henry Ashton (1819–1889), circus proprietor in Australia
- Jim Ashton (1891–1961), Australian footballer
