= Aston (name) =

Aston is an English surname and occasionally a given name.

Some notable persons with the name:

== Scientists ==
- Sir Aston Webb (1849–1930), English architect and President of the Royal Academy (1919–1924)
- Bernard Aston (1871–1951), English chemist and botanist
- Francis William Aston (1877–1945), Nobel prize-winning chemist and physicist, and inventor of the mass spectrograph.
- Helen Isobel Aston (1934–2020), Australian botanist and ornithologist
- Mick Aston (1946–2013), British archaeologist
- William George Aston (1841–1911), British consular official and Japanologist

== In government ==
- Sir Thomas Aston, 1st Baronet (1600–1646), English politician
- Walter Aston (burgess) (c. 1606–1656), member of the Virginia House of Burgesses
- Arthur Vincent Aston, official in the Malayan civil service
- Aston Kajara, minister in Uganda

== In sports ==
- Alfred Aston, French footballer and manager
- Bill Aston, British racing driver
- Ferdie Aston, South African rugby player
- Harry Aston (footballer, born 1855), English footballer
- Harry Aston (footballer, born 1881), played for West Bromwich Albion and Walsall
- Henry Hervey Aston (1759–1798), English cricketer
- Jack Aston (1877–1934), English footballer
- John Aston Sr., English footballer, father of Aston Jr.
- John Aston Jr., English footballer
- John Aston (cricketer), Irish cricketer
- Karen Aston, American collegiate basketball player and coach
- Ken Aston (1915–2001), English footballer
- Mark Aston, British rugby player
- Randolph Aston (1869–1930), English rugby player
- Aston Croall, English rugby player
- Aston Moore, Jamaican athlete
- Aston Whiteside (born 1989), American football player

== In music ==
- Jay Aston, British singer, formerly with the pop group Bucks Fizz
- Hugh Aston (c. 1485–1558)
- Michael Aston, rock musician
- Peter Aston (1938–2013), English composer and conductor
- Aston "Family Man" Barrett, Jamaican musician
- Aston Merrygold, British lead singer in JLS
- Adam Aston (1902–1993), Polish singer

== Writers ==
- Luise Aston (1814–1871), German writer and feminist
- Tilly Aston (1873–1947), blind Australian writer and teacher
- Aston Cockayne (1605–1684), well-known Cavalier and minor literary figure
- Manny Aston, Australian writer and teacher
- Constance Aston, seventeenth-century English manuscript author and anthologist (later Constance Aston Fowler)
- Elizabeth Aston, English author

== In other fields ==
- Arthur Aston (army officer) (1590–1649), professional soldier and supporter of Charles I in the English Civil War
- Cawton Aston (active 1693–1733), English builder of spinets
- Evelin Winifred Aston (1891–1975), English artist
- Sam Aston, British child actor
