= Berrenger's =

American television series

- Genre: Soap opera
- Created by: Diana Gould
- Theme music composer: Jerrold Immel
- Country of origin: United States
- Original language: English
- No. of seasons: 1
- No. of episodes: 12 (1 unaired)

Production
- Executive producers: David Jacobs; Stuart Sheslow
- Producer: Tom Cherones
- Running time: 60 minutes
- Production companies: Roundelay Productions; Lorimar Productions

Original release
- Network: NBC
- Release: January 5 – March 9, 1985

Berrenger's is an American prime-time soap opera television series created by Diana Gould that aired on NBC from January 5 to March 9, 1985. The series revolved around the Berrenger family, a New York dynasty which owned the glamorous department store which bore their name.

Following in the tradition of Dynasty and Dallas, Berrenger's played up to the familiar motifs of 1980s soap operas – glamorous and beautiful characters, using money and power in games of love, business and betrayal.

After nearly 3 months on the air, the series was cancelled due to poor ratings, leaving one episode unaired.

== Development ==
Produced in the mid-1980s, Berrenger's bore all the hallmarks of the genre and the era – a lavish central set (in this case, the department store's main floor, using the real-life location of Barneys in New York) and an expensive wardrobe budget, which dressed the cast, particularly the women, in current designer fashions.

The series was made by Lorimar, which was producing Dallas, Knots Landing and Falcon Crest. The marketing material which accompanied the launch of the series sold it with the tagline "... elegant clothes... beautiful people ... a powerful clan ..." and "Step through the etched-glass, art deco doors of this opulent retailer, where anything and everything can be bought or sold - for the right price - Berrenger's."

== Cast and characters ==
- Jonelle Allen as Stacey Russell
- Laura Ashton as Laurel Hayes
- Claudia Christian as Melody Hughes
- Jeff Conaway as John Higgins (eps. 1–7)
- Art Hindle as Todd Hughes
- Leslie Hope as Cammie Springer
- Yvette Mimieux as Shane Bradley
- Anita Morris as Barbara "Babs" Berrenger
- Ben Murphy as Paul Berrenger
- Jack Scalia as Danny Krucek
- Robin Strand as Billy Berrenger
- and Sam Wanamaker as Simon Berrenger

Simon Berrenger is a widower and the somewhat devious patriarch of the Berrenger department store empire. He has three children from his late wife Sarah. Paul, his eldest heir, and current president of Berrenger's, is unhappily married to socialite Gloria Brahms Berrenger (played by Andrea Marcovicci, credited as guest starring in every episode). They share a young son, David. Paul is having an affair with the stores' vice-president Shane Bradley. Simon's younger son, Billy, is in charge of public relations, and struggles with alcohol and gambling addiction. His only daughter, Barbara, is a divorcée and reformed party girl, who fights to prove herself to her father and make it on her own in the fashion industry.

Other characters working in the department store include junior salesgirl Stacey Russell, who is promoted to boutique manager in the first episode; nymphomaniac store model Laurel Hayes, who seduces Simon; Barbara's daughter Melody Hughes; philandering window-dresser John Higgins, who has his eye on the needy, vulnerable Barbara; ambitious store comptroller Todd Hughes, Melody's ex-husband; naive salesgirl Cammie Springer, who shares an apartment with Stacey and Laurel; and Danny Krucek, grandson of Rinaldi (guest star Cesar Romero), the sinister head of the conglomerate Trans-Allied, who has a mysterious vendetta against the Berrengers. Recurring characters include Julio Marales (Eddie Velez), a Hispanic fashion designer, and Max Kaufman (Alan Feinstein).

== Episodes ==
No.	Title	Directed by	Written by	Original release date	US viewers (millions)
1	"Overture"	Larry Elikann & Nicholas Sgarro	Diana Gould	January 5, 1985	11.9
2	"For Gloria's Benefit"	Lorraine Senna Ferrara	Lynn Marie Latham & Bernard Lechowick	January 12, 1985	11.6
3	"Of Boardrooms & Bedrooms"	Barbara Peeters	Susan Baskin	January 19, 1985	9.5
4	"Fame & Misfortune"	Robert Becker	Alan L. Gansberg	January 26, 1985	9.5
5	"Seductions"	Nick Havinga	Robert Rabinowitz	January 27, 1985	12.8
6	"Dangerous Ground"	Bill Duke	Scott Hamner	February 2, 1985	9.2
7	"Power Play"	Nick Havinga	Lynn Marie Latham & Bernard Lechowick	February 9, 1985	9.3
8	"Best Laid Plans"	Philip Leacock	Scott Hamner	February 16, 1985	7.5
9	"Roll Tape"	Linda Day	Brad Bailey	February 23, 1985	8.9
10	"Hidden Agenda"	Robert Becker	Robert Rabinowitz	March 2, 1985	8.6
11	"Maelstrom"	Michael Preece	Diana Gould	March 9, 1985	5.8
12	"Party Favors"	Linda Day	Sandra Kay Siegel	unaired	unaired
