= List of Family episodes =

This is a list of episodes for the television series Family.

== Series overview ==
Season	Episodes	Originally released	
Season	Episodes	First released	Last released
1	6	March 9, 1976	April 13, 1976
2	22	October 6, 1976	May 3, 1977
3	23	September 13, 1977	May 16, 1978
4	22	September 21, 1978	May 17, 1979
5	13	December 11, 1979	June 25, 1980

== Episodes ==
=== Season 1 (1976) ===
No. overall	No. in season	Title	Directed by	Written by	Original release date	Filming order
1	1	"Pilot: The Best Years"	Mark Rydell	Jay Presson Allen	March 9, 1976	L—00
2	2	"Monday Is Forever"	Glenn Jordan	Armyan Bernstein	March 16, 1976	L—03
3	3	"A Special Kind of Loving"	Randal Kleiser	Fred Segal	March 23, 1976	L—02
4	4	"A Right and Proper Goodbye"	Randal Kleiser	Nigel Evan McKeand & Carol Evan McKeand	March 30, 1976	L—04
5	5	"Thursday's Child"	Glenn Jordan	Nigel Evan McKeand & Carol Evan McKeand	April 6, 1976	L—01
6	6	"Point of Departure"	John Erman	Gordon Glasco	April 13, 1976	L—05

=== Season 2 (1976–77) ===
No. overall	No. in season	Title	Directed by	Written by	Original release date	Filming order
7	1	"Coming Apart"	John Erman	Hindi Brooks	October 6, 1976	L—06
8	2	"Such Sweet Sorrow"	Richard Kinon	Lawrence M. Konner	October 19, 1976	L—07
9	3	"Home Movies"	Glenn Jordan	Susan Miller	October 26, 1976	L—10
10	4	"Coming of Age"	John Erman	Elizabeth Clark	November 9, 1976	L—09
11	5	"Jury Duty: Part 1"	Glenn Jordan	S : Linda Weintraub; T : George Lefferts	November 16, 1976	L—12
12	6	"Jury Duty: Part 2"	Glenn Jordan	S : Linda Weintraub; T : George Lefferts	November 23, 1976	L—13
13	7	"The Cradle Will Fall"	Richard Kinon	T : Emily Shoemaker; S/T : Lawrence M. Konner	November 30, 1976	L—14
14	8	"Skeleton in the Closet"	John Erman	Leonora Thuna	December 7, 1976	L—15
15	9	"On the First Day of Christmas"	Gerald S. O'Loughlin	Michael Barlow	December 21, 1976	L—17
16	10	"Rites of Friendship"	Glenn Jordan	Gerry Day & Bethel Leslie	December 28, 1976	L—08
17	11	"An Eye to the Future"	Glenn Jordan	Michael Barlow & Hindi Brooks	January 4, 1977	L—11
18	12	"Lovers and Strangers"	Ralph Senensky	Leonora Thuna	January 11, 1977	L—18
19	13	"Return Engagement"	Richard Kinon	Anne Howard Bailey	January 18, 1977	L—16
20	14	"Mirror, Mirror on the Wall..."	Robert Hartford-Davis	Emily Shoemaker	February 1, 1977	L—19
21	15	"Someone's Watching"	Richard Kinon	David Jacobs	February 8, 1977	L—20
22	16	"A Safe House"	Richard Kinon	Marshall Herskovitz & Vicki Zlotnick	February 15, 1977	L—22
23	17	"Best Friends"	Robert Hartford-Davis	Diana Gould	February 22, 1977	L—21
24	18	"Taking Chances: Part 1"	Glenn Jordan	Hindi Brooks	March 1, 1977	L—23
25	19	"Taking Chances: Part 2"	Glenn Jordan	Hindi Brooks	March 8, 1977	L—24
26	20	"Coming and Goings"	Richard Kinon	S : Glenn Jordan; S/T : David Jacobs	March 22, 1977	L—25
27	21	"...More Things in Heaven and Earth"	Edward Parone	Len Jenkin	March 29, 1977	L—26
28	22	"An Endangered Species"	Peter Werner	Elizabeth Hailey & Oliver Hailey	May 3, 1977	L—27

=== Season 3 (1977–78) ===
No. overall	No. in season	Title	Directed by	Written by	Original release date	Filming order
29	1	"Acts of Love: Part 1"	E.W. Swackhamer	David Jacobs	September 13, 1977	L—33
30	2	"Acts of Love: Part 2"	E.W. Swackhamer	David Jacobs	September 20, 1977	L—34
31	3	"The First Time"	Richard Kinon	Hilma Wolitzer	September 27, 1977	L—28
32	4	"Change of Heart"	Edward Parone	Audrey Davis Levin	October 4, 1977	L—29
33	5	"Annie Laurie"	Alf Kjellin	David Jacobs & Carol Evan McKeand	October 25, 1977	L—35
34	6	"We Love You, Miss Jessup"	Edward Parone	Diana Gould	November 1, 1977	L—32
35	7	"The Little Brother"	Harvey S. Laidman	Gregory S. Dinallo	November 8, 1977	L—36
36	8	"Childhood's End"	Alf Kjellin	Luciano Comici	November 15, 1977	L—37
37	9	"A Tale Out of Season"	Richard Kinon	S : Len Jenkin; T : Barbara Elaine Smith	November 22, 1977	L—39
38	10	"Labors of Love"	Harvey S. Laidman	Tim Maschler	November 29, 1977	L—40
39	11	"A Child is Given"	Richard Kinon	Robert Hamilton	December 13, 1977	L—30
40	12	"More Than Friends"	Stuart Millar	Leah Appet & Randa Haines	January 3, 1978	L—38
41	13	"Princess in the Tower"	Richard Kinon	Carol Evan McKeand	January 10, 1978	L—44
42	14	"Echoes of Love"	James Sheldon	David Jacobs	January 17, 1978	L—43
43	15	"See Saw"	Philip Leacock	S : Len Jenkin; T : Barbara Elaine Smith	January 24, 1978	L—42
44	16	"Lifeline"	Richard Kinon	Hindi Brooks	January 31, 1978	L—41
45	17	"...And Baby Makes Three"	Edward Parone	Diana Gould	February 7, 1978	L—46
46	18	"Crossing Over"	Edward Parone	David Jacobs	February 14, 1978	L—49
47	19	"The Covenant"	James Sheldon	Jack Morton	February 21, 1978	L—45
48	20	"A Friend of the Family's"	Kim Friedman	Gregory S. Dinallo, John D. Hess & Emily Shoemaker	February 28, 1978	L—50
49	21	"Fear of Shadows"	Georg Stanford Brown	Paul Huson	May 2, 1978	L—31
50	22	"Sleeping Gypsy"	Stuart Millar	Richard Kramer	May 9, 1978	L—48
51	23	"Counterpoint"	Richard Kinon	Carmen Culver	May 16, 1978	L—47

=== Season 4 (1978–79) ===
No. overall	No. in season	Title	Directed by	Written by	Original release date	Filming order
52	1	"Starting Over"	Richard Kinon	Carol Evan McKeand	September 21, 1978	L—51
53	2	"All For Love"	Kim Friedman	Leah Markus	September 28, 1978	L—52
54	3	"Changes"	Edward Parone	Carol Evan McKeand	October 12, 1978	L—53
55	4	"Magic"	Richard Kinon	Channing Gibson	October 19, 1978	L—54
56	5	"Just Friends"	Peter Levin	Walter Koenig	November 9, 1978	L—55
57	6	"Generations"	Richard Kinon	Florrie Adelson	November 23, 1978	L—61
58	7	"Expectations"	Edward Parone	Liz Coe	December 7, 1978	L—56
59	8	"Gifts"	Philip Leacock	Paul Wolff	December 21, 1978	L—65
60	9	"The Friend's Affair"	Philip Leacock	Calvin Clements Jr.	January 4, 1979	L—57
61	10	"Exits and Entrances"	Gwen Arner	S : Jackie Joseph & Carolyn See; T : Emily Shoemaker	January 11, 1979	L—60
62	11	"Moment of Truth"	Arthur Allan Seidelman	Paul Huson	January 18, 1979	L—66
63	12	"Malicious Mischief"	Peter Levin	Loraine Despres	January 25, 1979	L—67
64	13	"Sleeping Over"	Richard Kinon	Thom Racina	February 1, 1979	L—58
65	14	"Disco Queen"	Edward Parone	Edward Zwick	February 8, 1979	L—64
66	15	"The Athlete"	Kim Friedman	Marshall Herskovitz	March 3, 1979	L—71
67	16	"The Competition"	Richard Kinon	Ron Cowen & Daniel Lipman	March 8, 1979	L—62
68	17	"Ballerina"	Edward Zwick	Edward Zwick	March 15, 1979	L—72
69	18	"Diversions"	James Broderick	Barbara Bosson & Diana Gould	March 22, 1979	L—63
70	19	"An Apple for the Teacher"	Kim Friedman	S : Channing Gibson; T : Margaret J. Schibi	March 30, 1979	L—69
71	20	"Prelude"	Philip Leacock	Diana Gould	April 20, 1979	L—59
72	21	"Going Straight"	James Broderick	Marshall Herskovitz	May 10, 1979	L—70
73	22	"From Russia with Love"	Richard Kinon	S : Thom Racina; T : Edward Zwick	May 17, 1979	L—68

=== Season 5 (1979–80) ===
No. overall	No. in season	Title	Directed by	Written by	Original release date	Filming order
74	1	"Thanksgiving"	Joanne Woodward	Sally Robinson	December 11, 1979	L—82
75	2	"'Tis the Season"	Richard Kinon	Joan Taylor	December 24, 1979	L—77
76	3	"Jack of Hearts"	Edward Parone	April Smith	January 14, 1980	L—74
77	4	"When the Bough Breaks"	Gwen Arner	Sally Robinson	January 21, 1980	L—80
78	5	"Hard Times"	Richard Kinon	Liz Coe & Sally Robinson	January 28, 1980	L—83
79	6	"Whispers"	Marshall Herskovitz	Ron Cowen & Daniel Lipman	February 4, 1980	L—78
80	7	"Play on Love"	Richard Kinon	Margaret J. Schibi	March 3, 1980	L—81
81	8	"Daylight Serenade"	Edward Parone	Liz Coe	March 10, 1980	L—76
82	9	"Such a Fine Line"	James Broderick	Gina Frederica Goldman	March 17, 1980	L—84
83	10	"The Ties that Bind"	Richard Kinon	Carol Evan McKeand	June 4, 1980	L—73
84	11	"Just Like Old Times"	Richard Kinon	Liz Coe	June 11, 1980	L—79
85	12	"Smarts"	James Broderick	Edward Zwick	June 18, 1980	L—75
86	13	"Letting Go"	Edward Zwick	Edward Zwick	June 25, 1980	L—85
