= Henry Ashton =

Henry Ashton may refer to:

- Henry Ashton (architect) (1801–1872), British architect
- Henry Ashton, 4th Baron Ashton of Hyde (born 1958), British peer
- Henry Ashton (actor) (born 1991), English actor
- Henry M. Ashton, member of the Illinois House of Representatives
- Henry Ashton (governor), governor of Antigua 1640–1652
- Henry Ashton (burgess) on List of members of the Virginia House of Burgesses

== See also ==
- Henry Aston (1759–1798), English cricketer
- Harry Ashton (disambiguation)
- Ashton (surname)
