= Ralph Ashton =

Ralph Ashton may refer to:

- Roger Ashton (died 1592), English Roman Catholic soldier
- Ralph de Ashton (fl. 1421–1486), officer of state under Edward IV of England
