= Ashton =

Ashton may refer to:

== Names ==
- Ashton (given name)
- Ashton (surname)

== Places ==
=== Australia ===
- Ashton, Elizabeth Bay, a heritage-listed house in Sydney, New South Wales
- Ashton, South Australia

=== Canada ===
- Ashton, Ontario

=== New Zealand ===
- Ashton, New Zealand

=== South Africa ===
- Ashton, Western Cape

=== United Kingdom ===
==== England ====
- Ashton, Cambridgeshire
- Ashton, Cornwall
- Ashton, Devon
- Ashton, Hampshire
- Ashton, Herefordshire
- Ashton, North Northamptonshire, near Oundle
- Ashton, West Northamptonshire, near Northampton
- Ashton, Somerset, a hamlet in the parish of Chapel Allerton, Sedgemoor district
- Long Ashton or Ashton, North Somerset
- Ashton Common, Wiltshire
- Ashton Green, East Sussex
- Ashton Hayes, Cheshire
- Ashton Keynes, Wiltshire
- Ashton under Hill, Worcestershire
- Ashton upon Mersey, Greater Manchester
- Ashton-in-Makerfield, Greater Manchester in the Metropolitan Borough of Wigan
- Ashton (ward), an electoral ward in Wigan
- Ashton-on-Ribble, Lancashire
- Ashton-under-Lyne, Greater Manchester

==== Scotland ====
- Ashton, Inverclyde
- Ashton Lane, Glasgow

=== United States ===
- Ashton, Georgia
- Ashton, Idaho
- Ashton, Illinois
- Ashton, Iowa
- Ashton, Kansas
- Ashton, Maryland
- Ashton, Michigan
- Ashton, Minnesota
- Ashton, Missouri
- Ashton, Nebraska
- Ashton, South Dakota
- Ashton, West Virginia
- Ashton, Wisconsin
- Ashton Corners, Wisconsin

== Other uses ==
- Avro Ashton, a 1950s British experimental jet airliner
- Ashton Builders, a former UK home builder
- Ashton Canal, a canal in England
- Ashton Middle School, formerly Dunstable Grammar School, Dunstable
- Ashton Music, a brand of mainly entry-level musical instruments and related equipment
- Ashton Observatory, an observatory within Ashton-Wildwood Park in Jasper County, Iowa
- Ashton Sixth Form College, Ashton-under-Lyne
- Ashton United F.C., Ashton-under-Lyne
- Ashton (cigar), a brand of cigar established in 1985, manufactured by Arturo Fuente
- Ashton (horse)
- The Ashton, a residential skyscraper in Austin, Texas, U.S.

== See also ==
- Ashton Gate (disambiguation)
- Aston (disambiguation)
