= Arthur Jacob Ashton =

Arthur Jacob Ashton, KC (4 February 1855 – 23 March 1925) was an English barrister and judge.

== Life and career ==
Ashton was educated at Warrington Grammar School, Manchester Grammar School and Balliol College, Oxford, where he had won the first classical scholarship, graduating with first-class honours in both classical moderations and literae humaniores. He was called to the bar by the Inner Temple in 1881, took silk in 1906, and was elected a bencher of his inn in 1914.

He was Recorder of Manchester from 1914 until his death and Judge of Appeal on the Isle of Man from 1921 until his death. Shortly before his death, he had been appointed as the head of the Inns of Court School of Law and Director of Legal Studies.

== Family ==
Two of his children were Helen Ashton and Sir Leigh Ashton.
