= Diana Gould (writer) =

American screenwriter (born 1944)

- Born: October 11, 1944 (age 82); New York, New York, U.S.
- Education: BA, University of California, Los Angeles, 1967; MFA Bennington College, 2004.
- Occupations: Screenwriter and author

Diana Gould (born October 11, 1944) is an American screenwriter and author who has worked in television for much of her career and published her first novel, Coldwater, a noir thriller, in 2013.

== Early life and education ==
Diana Gould was born on October 11, 1944, in New York City. She attended the High School of Music & Art, and graduated from UCLA in 1967 with a B.A. in Film. Gould wrote a screenplay in college that was made into the film Jenny, which starred Marlo Thomas and Alan Alda. The script was rewritten by its director, George Bloomfield with Martin Lavut, and the finished product bore little resemblance to the film she had written. Gould only received credit for the story.

In 2004, she earned a Master of Fine Arts degree in fiction from the graduate writers program at Bennington College.

== Career ==
As a television writer and producer, her credits include pilots, episodes, movies and miniseries for network and cable.

=== Episodic television ===
One of Gould’s first credits was as a writer on the TV series Family from 1977 to 1979. Following Family, Gould was a writer and executive story consultant on the popular TV series Knots Landing (1980–1984) and producer and story writer on the equally popular show Dynasty (1985–86). She worked as a producer on the series Kay O'Brien in 1986–87.

=== Berrenger's ===
In 1985, Gould created the TV series Berrenger's, where she was producer and writer. The series revolved around the Berrenger family that owned the successful department store which bore their name. The Berrenger family was a New York dynasty composed of glamorous characters who used money and power to further their goals in love and business.

== Professional activities ==
She served on the board of directors of the Writers Guild of America, West, and founded what became the Women’s Committee within that Guild. The Committee compiled the first statistical survey of the number of women writers working in network television. The survey found that in the 1973 season, only a tiny proportion of scripts were written by women. Shortly thereafter, women’s committees were formed in the Screen Actors Guild and the Directors Guild, which worked in concert to improve opportunities for women in film and television. For most of the 1990s, Gould was a member of the Hollywood Women's Political Committee.

== Awards ==
She received the Population Institute Award for a 1974 TV Movie, I Love You... Goodbye, starring Hope Lange and Earl Holliman, produced by Tomorrow Entertainment for ABC. Her short story "The Monkey's Daughter" was nominated for the UCLA's Writing Program's James Kirkwood Literary Prize.

== Book ==
Gould's debut novel, Coldwater, was published in April 2013 by Gibraltar Road/Vireo, an imprint of Rare Bird Books. Coldwater is a fast-paced Hollywood crime novel, with a flawed and heroic female protagonist.

== Teaching and training ==
Gould has taught fiction, screen and playwriting at Goddard College, and she continues to coach writers privately.

In 2012, she completed the Community Dharma Leader training program at Spirit Rock Meditation Center, and teaches at InsightLA, a meditation center in the Theravada Buddhist tradition in Los Angeles. She is the guiding teacher of Dharma Alliance, the LGBTQ group at InsightLA. Gould leads the Thursday night sitting group at InsightLA. She completed the Buddhist Chaplaincy Training program at the Sati Center in Redwood City, and works as a spiritual care volunteer with Vitas Hospice. In 2011, she won the "Volunteer of the Year" Award from Vitas.

=== Other television credits ===
- Twice in a Lifetime (1999) (TV series) - S1.E13 - "Second Service"
- For My Daughter's Honor (1996) (TV movie)
- A House of Secrets and Lies (1992) (Teleplay)
- Sisters (1991) (TV series) - S1.E5 - "Of Mice and Women"
- I'll Take Manhattan (1987) (Miniseries) - 4 episodes
- La Ciociara (1988) (Teleplay adaptation of Two Women)
- Rock Rainbow (1978) (TV pilot)
- I Love You... Goodbye (1974) (TV movie)
- Jenny (1970) (Story)
