= Ashton Gate =

Ashton Gate is the name of:

- Ashton Gate, Bristol, a district of Bristol
- Ashton Gate (stadium), a stadium located in Ashton Gate, Bristol, home to Bristol Bears RFC and Bristol City FC
- Ashton Gate railway station, a disused railway station located in Ashton Gate, Bristol
- Ashton Gate Brewery Co, a brewery located in Ashton Gate, Bristol

== See also ==
- Ashton (disambiguation)
