= White Corridors =

1951 British film by Pat Jackson

- Directed by: Pat Jackson
- Screenplay by: Jan Read; Pat Jackson
- Based on: novel Yeoman's Hospital by Helen Ashton
- Produced by: Joseph Janni; John Croydon
- Starring: Googie Withers
- Cinematography: C. M. Pennington-Richards
- Edited by: Sidney Hayers
- Production company: Vic Films Productions
- Distributed by: General Film Distributors (UK)
- Release date: 12 June 1951 (London)
- Running time: 102 minutes
- Country: United Kingdom
- Language: English

White Corridors is a 1951 British drama film directed by Pat Jackson and starring Googie Withers, Godfrey Tearle, James Donald and Petula Clark. It was written by Jan Read and Jackson based on the 1944 novel Yeoman's Hospital by Helen Ashton.

The film is set in a hospital shortly after the establishment of the National Health Service.

== Plot ==
The day-to-day life of the staff and patients at a city hospital. The central story is that of doctors Sophie Dean and Neil Marriner, who are in love, and their fight to save the life of Tommy Briggs, a little boy with blood poisoning.

== Cast ==
- Googie Withers as Dr. Sophie Dean
- James Donald as Dr. Neil Marriner
- Brand Inglis as Tommy Briggs
- Godfrey Tearle as Mr. Groom, Sr.
- Petula Clark as Joan Shepherd
- Jean Anderson as Sister Gater
- Timothy Bateson as Dr. Cook
- Fabia Drake as Miss Farmer
- Henry Edwards as Phillip Brewster
- Gerard Heinz as Dr. Macuzek
- Megs Jenkins as Mrs. Briggs
- Barry Jones as Dr. Shoesmith
- Avice Landone as Sister Jenkins
- Bernard Lee as Burgess
- Moira Lister as Dolly Clark
- Basil Radford as retired civil servant
- Bruce Seton as policeman
- Mary Hinton as matron
- Jack Watling as Dick Groom
- Philip Stainton as Sawyer
- Dana Wynter as Margery Brewster (uncredited)
- Deidre Doyle as woman patient (uncredited)
- Mignon O'Doherty as irrascible woman (uncredited)
- Humphrey Howorth as Chandler (uncredited)
- Patrick Troughton as sailor patient (uncredited)
- Dandy Nichols as char woman in waiting room (uncredited)

== Production ==
The film marked Googie Withers's return to acting after 13 months off following the birth of her child. John Mills at one stage was announced to play the male lead.

Bombardier Billy Wells, the man who strikes the gong on the Rank trademark, had a small role.

Filming took place early 1951. The director, Pat Jackson, claims making the film was "a joy" and says it was shot in five weeks.

== Reception ==
=== Box office ===
White Corridors was the 8th most popular film at the British box office in 1951. it was judged by Kinematograph Weekly as a "notable performer" at British cinemas in 1951.

=== Critical ===
The Monthly Film Bulletin wrote: "The material of White Corridors is not distinguished, and its episodic structure emphasises that the characterisation is mainly one-dimensional; the interweaving of a series of glimpsed characters needed a firmer conception if real depth were to be given to them and thus to the whole background of the hospital which the film sets out to explore. But on a surface level the film is remarkably successful, due to the persuasive talents of its director, Pat Jackson."

The Radio Times Guide to Films gave the film 3/5 stars, writing: "While it may sound like a hokey soap opera, it is actually a well-made British A-feature, realistically played by a large and excellent cast that includes a number of well-known faces."

Leslie Halliwell said: "Competent multi-drama which found a big audience."

In British Sound Films: The Studio Years 1928–1959 David Quinlan rated the film as "very good", writing: "Intelligently handled, episodic medical drama always carries energy at its core."

== Accolades ==
At the 1951 BAFTAS it was nominated for Best Film and Best British Film. Petula Clark was nominated for Best Supporting Actress.
