= Jenny (1969 film) =

1969 film directed by George Bloomfield

- Theatrical release poster
- Directed by: George Bloomfield
- Screenplay by: Martin Lavut; George Bloomfield
- Story by: Diana Gould
- Produced by: Edgar J. Scherick
- Starring: Marlo Thomas; Alan Alda; Marian Hailey; Phil Bruns; Charlotte Rae; Vincent Gardenia; Elizabeth Wilson; Stephen Strimpell; Michael Mislove; Fred Willard
- Cinematography: David L. Quaid
- Edited by: Kent McKinney
- Music by: Michael Small
- Production companies: ABC Pictures; Palomar Pictures
- Distributed by: Cinerama Releasing Corporation
- Release dates: December 22, 1969 (San Francisco); January 2, 1970 (U.S.)
- Running time: 89 minutes
- Country: United States
- Language: English
- Budget: $1,550,000
- Box office: $2,825,000

Jenny is a 1969 American drama film starring Marlo Thomas, in her film debut, and Alan Alda, produced by ABC Pictures and released by Cinerama Releasing Corp. Singer-songwriter Harry Nilsson provided Jenny's theme song, "Waiting".

== Plot ==
Jenny, a young small-town woman, moves away to the city when she becomes pregnant through a one-night stand. She meets film director Delano, who has received a draft notice and does not want to be inducted into the Army. Jenny and Delano take a liking to each other. Learning that an acquaintance got out of having to serve by having a baby on the way, Delano offers to marry Jenny, claim paternity and support her baby, if she in turn will play along, and he can avoid being drafted.

In the months until Jenny's baby is born, the couple experiences the ups and downs of their in-name-only marriage, including a visit back to her family and hometown, and his ongoing relationship with another woman, as Delano and Jenny await the outcome of his draft case. At the end of the film, Jenny goes into labor. Delano brings Jenny a little music box; as it plays a nurse brings in Jenny's new baby. Jenny lovingly holds the newborn and begins to breastfeed as Delano looks on. The film ends with the two of them staring at the newborn, sleeping soundly in its mother's arms.

== Selected cast ==
- Marlo Thomas as Jenny Marsh
- Alan Alda as Delano
- Marian Hailey as Kay
- Phil Bruns as Fred Callahan
- Charlotte Rae as Bella Star
- Vincent Gardenia as Mr. Marsh
- Elizabeth Wilson as Mrs. Marsh
- Stephen Strimpell as Peter

== Release ==
The film opened at the Stage Door Theatre in San Francisco on December 22, 1969.

== Box office ==
In its opening week at the Stage Door Theatre it grossed $16,000. After 26 weeks of release, it reached number one at the US box office. By 1973, the film had earned rentals of $2,010,000 in the United States and Canada and $815,000 in other countries. After all costs were deducted, it recorded an overall loss of $1,170,000.

== Reception ==
Roger Greenspun wrote in the New York Times:

Jenny is a very old‐fashioned film, gently accumulating the paraphernalia of a certain opportune modernism. All the movie memories are intellectual properties of a sort that you may discard if you wish to 'sigh' over the sad‐happy story of a girl and her guy and her baby.
But it isn't so easy to make old‐fashioned movies now, and the values and life‐styles the film plays with, keep playing with it in return—so that Jenny often stumbles into (and alas, out of) a better kind of movie than it has any right to be.

== Accolades ==
The film was nominated for the Golden Globe Award for Most Promising Newcomer – Female (Marlo Thomas) in 1971.
