= William Ashton =

William or Bill Ashton may refer to:

- Bill Ashton (jazz musician) (1936–2025), British jazz musician
- Brian Ashton (rugby union) (born 1946), full name William Brian Ashton
- William Howard Ashton (born 1943), real name of Billy J. Kramer, English singer
- Will Ashton (1881–1963), British-Australian artist
- William Ashton (MP) (1575–1646), British Member of Parliament for Hertford, 1621–1625 and Appleby 1626, 1628
- William Ashton, Chief Engineer of the Oregon Short Line Railroad (fl. c. 1881), after whom the city of Ashton, Idaho was named
- William E. Ashton (1859–1933), American gynaecologist and Army officer during World War I
