= Helen Ashton =

British writer (1891–1958)

Helen Rosaline Ashton Jordan
- Ashton in 1934
- Born: Helen Rosaline Ashton; 18 October 1891; Kensington, London, England
- Died: 27 June 1958 (aged 66); Lechlade, Gloucestershire, England
- Other name: Helen Ashton
- Occupations: Writer, novelist and physician
- Years active: 1913-1958
- Spouse: Arthur Jordan
- Parents: Arthur Jacob Ashton (father); Emma Burnie (mother)

Helen Rosaline Ashton Jordan (18 October 1891 – 27 June 1958) was a British novelist, literary biographer, and physician.

== Life ==
Helen Rosaline Ashton was born in Kensington, London, the daughter of Emma Burnie and Arthur Jacob Ashton, KC, Recorder of Manchester. Her brother was Sir Leigh Ashton, director of the Victoria and Albert Museum.

She published her first novel in 1913, Pierrot in Town. During World War I, she nursed as a VAD, and over the course of the war she published two more novels.

After the war, Ashton studied medicine, qualifying from the London Hospital in 1921 and graduating M.B., B.S. in 1922. She was then a house physician at Great Ormond Street Hospital until she married Arthur Jordan, a barrister, in 1927. After her marriage, Ashton retired from medicine but continued to write.

Over forty-five years she published twenty-six books, which included a literary biography, I Had a Sister (written with her sister, Katharine Davies, in 1937 – a study of Mary Lamb, Dorothy Wordsworth, Caroline Herschel and Cassandra Austen), and several biographical novels, including William and Dorothy (1938) and Parson Austen's Daughter (1949). Her first major fictional success was Doctor Serocold (1930) in which she was able to draw upon her medical knowledge. Her other successful novels included Bricks and Mortar (1932), republished in 2004 by Persephone Books, and Yeoman's Hospital (1944), on which the 1951 film White Corridors was based.

She died at age sixty-six, on June 27, 1958, in Lechlade, Gloucestershire.

== Bibliography ==
=== Novels ===
- Pierrot in Town (1913)
- Almain (1914)
- Marshdikes (1917)
- A Lot of Talk (1927)
- Far Enough (1928)
- A Background for Caroline (1929)
- Doctor Serocold: A Page from His Day-Book (1930)
- Mackerel Sky: A Conversation Piece (1931)
- Bricks and Mortar (1932)
- Belinda Grove (1933)
- Family Cruise: A Marine Comedy (1934)
- Hornet's Nest (1935)
- Dust Over the Ruins (1936)
- People in Cages (1937)
- William and Dorothy (1938) - a biographical novel about William Wordsworth and his sister, Dorothy Wordsworth
- The Swan of Usk: A Historical Novel (1940) - a biographical novel about the poet Henry Vaughan
- Tadpole Hall (1941)
- Joanna at Littlefold (1942; also published as Joanna)
- Yeoman's Hospital (1944)
- The Captain Comes Home (1947; also published as The Lost Captain)
- Parson Austen's Daughter (1949) - a biographical novel about Jane Austen and her family
- Letty Landon (1951) - a biographical novel about Letitia Landon
- Footman in Powder: A Panorama (1954)
- The Half-Crown House (1956)
- Return to Cheltenham (1958; also published as The Hedge of Thorns)

=== Nonfiction ===
- I Had a Sister: A Study of Mary Lamb, Dorothy Wordsworth, Caroline Herschel, Cassandra Austen (1937; written with her sister, Katharine Davies)
