= Robertson Crichton =

British judge (1912–1985)

Sir Robertson Crichton

Justice of the High Court
- In office 1967–1977

Personal details
- Born: John Robertson Dunn Crichton; 2 November 1912
- Died: 12 July 1985 (aged 72)
- Education: Sedbergh School; Balliol College, Oxford

Sir John Robertson Dunn Crichton (2 November 1912 – 12 July 1985), judicially styled as Mr Justice Crichton, was a British barrister and High Court judge.

== Biography ==
The son of Alexander Cansh Crichton and Beatrice Crichton, of Wallasey, Cheshire, Crichton was educated at Sedbergh School and Balliol College, Oxford. He was called to the Bar by the Middle Temple in 1936. During the Second World War, he served with the Royal Artillery (Territorial Army). Returning to the Bar after the war, he was made a King's Counsel in 1951.

Crichton was Recorder of Blackpool from 1952 to 1960, Judge of Appeal of the Isle of Man from 1956 to 1960, and Recorder of Manchester and Judge of the Crown Court at Manchester from 1960 to 1967, when he was appointed a Justice of the High Court, in succession to Mr Justice Lawrence. Receiving the customary knighthood, he was assigned to the Queen's Bench Division, retiring in 1977.

== Family ==
Crichton became engaged in 1941 to the actress Noele Gordon, but broke the engagement shortly before the wedding, allegedly because of his family's disapproval of her occupation.

He later married Margaret Vanderlip Watrous, daughter of Colonel Livingston Watrous, of Washington, DC, and Nantucket, Massachusetts; they had two sons and one daughter. Lady Crichton died in 1999.
