= David Maddison =

British judge (1947–2019)

Sir David George Maddison (22 January 1947 – 29 June 2019) was a British judge of the High Court of Justice, part of the Courts of England and Wales.

Maddison studied at Durham University (Grey College). He was called to the bar at Inner Temple in 1970 and elected as a Bencher in 2005. He was appointed an Assistant Recorder in 1986, a Recorder in 1990, and a Circuit Judge in 1992. He served as a Member of the Parole Board from 1996 to 2002. In 2003, he was appointed a Senior Circuit Judge in 2003, Honorary Recorder of Manchester from 2003 to 2008, and Resident Judge for Manchester Crown Court. Maddison served in those roles until his appointment as a Justice of the High Court on 29 January 2008. He was assigned to the Queen’s Bench Division and received the customary knighthood. During his time on the High Court, he served as Judicial Member to the Crown Court Rule Committee in 2009 and Director of Criminal Training for the Judicial Studies Board in 2010. On 22 May 2013, Maddison retired from the bench. Maddison died on 29 June 2019 following an illness.

He is played by Roger Ringrose in the 2025 ITV drama about the News International phone hacking scandal, The Hack, in a depiction of the trial in connection with the murder of Daniel Morgan.
