= Truly Tasteless Jokes =

1982 best seller and sequels by Blanche Knott

- Author: Blanche Knott
- Language: English
- Genre: Humor
- Published: 1982
- Publisher: Ballantine Books
- Publication place: United States
- Pages: 128
- ISBN: 978-0-345-32920-2

Truly Tasteless Jokes is a book of off-color humor by Ashton Applewhite, first published in 1982 under the pen name "Blanche Knott." The book was a cultural phenomenon and spawned dozens of sequels, including the best-sellers Truly Tasteless Jokes Two (1983) and Truly Tasteless Jokes Three (1984) and a stand-up comedy special.

== Background ==
Applewhite moved to New York City in 1977 to work for St. Martin's Press, where she learned numerous offensive jokes, which her boss encouraged her to write down. In a 2011 article in Harper's Magazine, Applewhite wrote that her collection of jokes quickly grew, and she would ask her coworkers and friends if they knew any others. Frustrated over her $8,500 annual salary as a lowly assistant, she decided to compile a book of the jokes to publish.

Applewhite asked a colleague to be her book agent, but their attempts to have the book published resulted in strong rejections; Applewhite recalled that her agent was told by Dell Publishing's paperback imprint that "We can't publish this here. I'm not even sure we can Xerox it."

Marilyn Abraham, an editor at Random House imprint Ballantine Books, decided to publish it. The original title was one of Applewhite's favorite jokes, What’s the Difference Between Garbage and a Girl from New Jersey? (punchline: garbage gets picked up); however, the marketing director responded that she did not get it and wanted to know what the book was about. Applewhite responded, "It’s a book of tasteless jokes," which the marketing director liked.

== Summary ==
Applewhite organized her joke collection into "timeless categories" including Helen Keller ("How did Helen Keller burn her fingers? Reading the waffle iron"), dead baby, Jewish, WASP, black, Polish, homosexual, and handicapped. The book's jokes were typically a few lines or paragraphs in length.

== Reception ==
Truly Tasteless Jokes became a runaway bestseller, appearing on the bestseller lists of The New York Times, The Washington Post and Publishers Weekly. The original book was the best-selling mass-market paperback of 1983; Truly Tasteless Jokes Two was No. 10 on the same list.

The book's uncensored jokes received significant criticism. Historian Barbara Tuchman spoke of the "breakdown of decency and of standards of taste" in these "terribly tasteless, disgusting books," while professor John Hope Franklin said the books' success was "a sad testament to the taste of this country." In a satirical vein, an installment of the comic strip Bloom County featured a book with a title similar to Truly Tasteless Jokes, portrayed as an inspirational text read by members of a counterculture resembling the hippies of the 1960s, but espousing conservative views considered typical of the Reagan era in American politics. The condemnation and criticism, however, did little to stop the book's success.

Critic Edward Rothstein, analyzing the books' success for The New York Times, wrote, "... the telling of a joke brings into the light of society that which is hidden; it creates a marriage between the respectable and the unacceptable. Tasteless jokes, though, would seem to have gone far beyond the bounds. These are not subtle expressions, their critics charge, but slurs and violations. They result not in marriage, nor even in an affair, but in a reconnoiter somewhere in the shadows. Actually, however, the rendezvous takes place in full daylight, with prejudices and fears displayed for the pleasure of thousands, and the point being made may not be as obvious as it at first appears. ... The tastelessness of these jokes—many of which have been told for generations—is their main point: Prejudice is mocked, distended to a ludicrous degree. The target of these outrageous and gross quips is the very pieties of society that apply such labels. They make us laugh at the pretense that such prejudices do not exist and at the respectable assertion that we are really all the same."

In 2017, the rapper Eminem claimed the book was representative of his sense of humor, saying, "...[Truly Tasteless Jokes is] all fucked up shit; it makes me laugh — and that kind of stuff is where my brain goes. I'm not saying I've never gone too far, but people shouldn't be looking to me for political correctness."
