= Toni Ashton =

Professor of health economics in New Zealand

- Born: 1947

Academic background
- Education: University of Auckland
- Thesis: Quasi-Markets and Contracting for Health Services (1999)
- Doctoral advisor: Basil Sharp

Academic work
- Institutions: University of Auckland

Toni Ashton is a New Zealand health economist, and was a full professor at the University of Auckland, specialising in the funding and structure of health systems.

== Academic career ==
Ashton completed a PhD titled Quasi-Markets and Contracting for Health Services at the University of Auckland. Ashton then joined the faculty of the School of Population Health of the University of Auckland at Tāmaki, rising to full professor in 2012. Ashton has been part of the Child Poverty Action Group.

Ashton's research focuses on how health reforms, and how health services are organised and funded. In 2013, she co-led a collaboration between New Zealand and Canada to investigate models of community care for complex health needs in older adults. The Canadian side of the five-year research project was led by Dr Walter Wodchis at the University of Toronto.

In 2019, with Felicity Goodyear-Smith, Ashton published a critique of New Zealand's health system. Ashton and Goodyear-Smith's 2019 study identified seven areas of weakness in the system, including division between primary care and hospitals, inequity between treatments for injury versus disease, lack of funding, and workforce issues, and described how these weaknesses worsened inequitable access to healthcare. Ashton has also researched the cost of a healthy retirement in New Zealand.

In 2010 Ashton, then an associate professor, was awarded a University of Auckland Sustained Excellence in Teaching award.

== Selected works ==
- Wong, Conroy; Jayaram, Lata; Karalus, Noel; et al. (2012). "Azithromycin for prevention of exacerbations in non-cystic fibrosis bronchiectasis (EMBRACE): a randomised, double-blind, placebo-controlled trial". The Lancet. 380 (9842): 660–667. doi:10.1016/s0140-6736(12)60953-2. PMID 22901887. Wikidata Q48399869.
- Elley, Carolyn Raina; Kerse, Ngaire Margaret; Arroll, Bruce; Swinburn, Boyd Anthony; Ashton, Toni; Robinson, Elizabeth (2004). "Cost-effectiveness of physical activity counselling in general practice". The New Zealand Medical Journal. 117 (1207): U1216. PMID 15608809. Wikidata Q50783045.
- Lal, Anita; Moodie, Marjory; Ashton, Toni; Siahpush, Mohammad; Swinburn, Boyd Anthony (2012). "Health care and lost productivity costs of overweight and obesity in New Zealand". Australian and New Zealand Journal of Public Health. 36 (6): 550–556. doi:10.1111/j.1753-6405.2012.00931.x. PMID 23216496. Wikidata Q43899994.
- Haas, Marion; Ashton, Toni; Blum, Kerstin; et al. (2009). "Drugs, sex, money and power: an HPV vaccine case study". Health Policy. 92 (2–3): 288–295. doi:10.1016/j.healthpol.2009.05.002. PMID 19505744. Wikidata Q39972866.
- Kolt, Gregory; Schofield, Grant; Kerse, Ngaire Margaret; Garrett, Nick; Ashton, Toni; Patel, Asmita (2012). "Healthy Steps trial: pedometer-based advice and physical activity for low-active older adults". Annals of Family Medicine. 10 (3): 206–212. doi:10.1370/afm.1345. PMC 3354969. PMID 22585884. Wikidata Q35968191.
- Jalal Mohammed; North, Nicola; Ashton, Toni (2015). "Decentralisation of Health Services in Fiji: A Decision Space Analysis". international journal of health policy and management. 5 (3): 173–181. doi:10.15171/ijhpm.2015.199. PMC 4770923. PMID 26927588. Wikidata Q38675492.
