= William E. Ashton =

American gynecologist and surgeon (1859–1933)

William Easterly Ashton
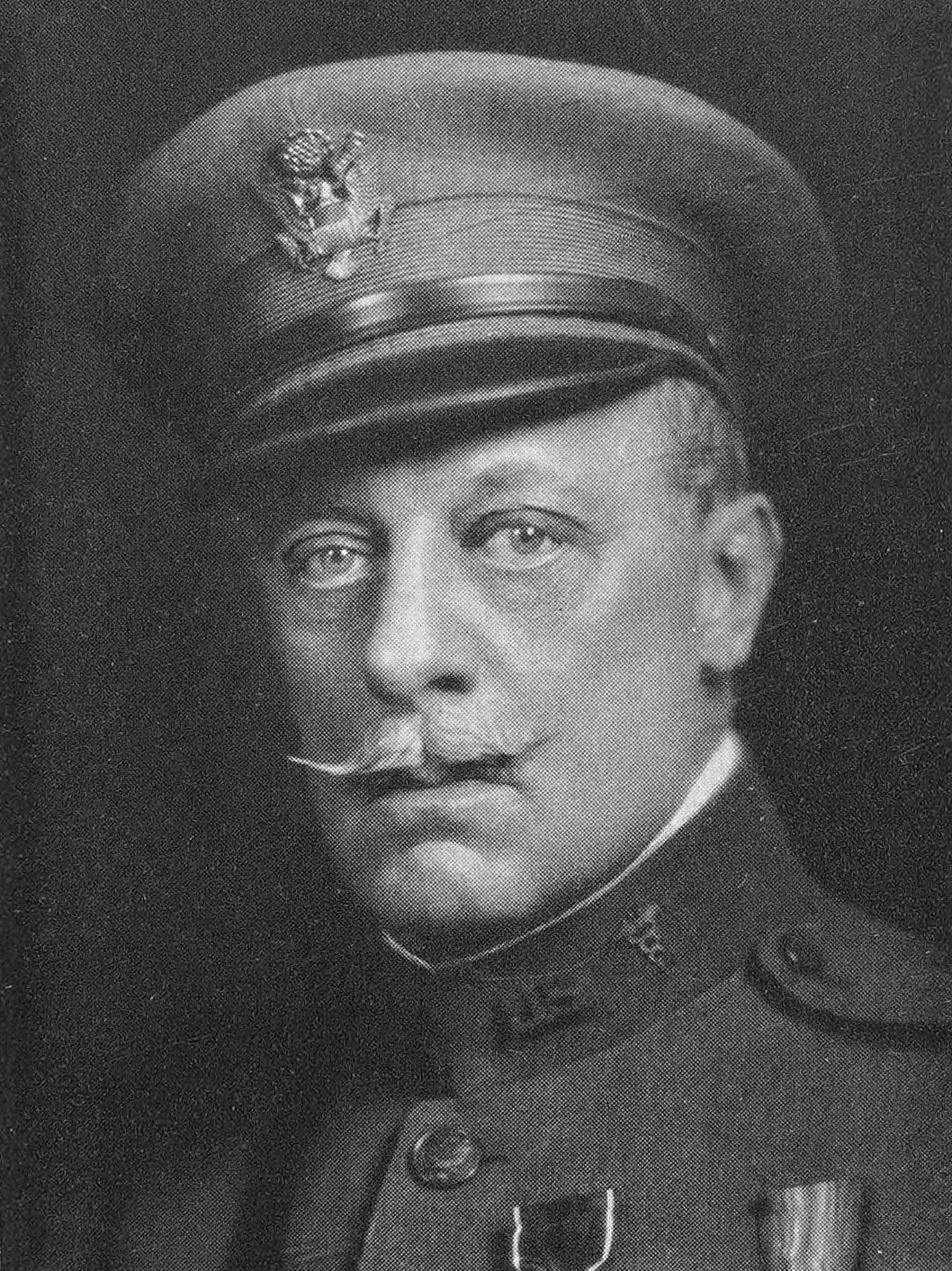
- Born: June 5, 1859; Philadelphia, Pennsylvania, US
- Died: March 30, 1933 (aged 73); Philadelphia, Pennsylvania
- Spouse: Alice Elizabeth
- Relatives: Samuel Keen Ashton, Thomas G. Ashton
- Military career
- Branch: United States Army
- Service years: 1917–1919
- Rank: Lieutenant colonel

William Easterly Ashton (June 5, 1859 – March 30, 1933) was a noted gynecologist and surgeon. He also served in the United States Army as a regimental surgeon during World War I.

== Early life and education ==
Ashton was born in Philadelphia, Pennsylvania, on June 5, 1859, to Samuel Keen and Caroline M. Ashton. His brother is Thomas G. Ashton.

He attended the University of Pennsylvania and graduated as a Doctor of Medicine in 1881. He later attended Jefferson Medical College and Ursinus.

== Early medical career ==
Ashton served on the faculty of the hospital and Jefferson Medical College from 1884 until 1892.

From 1892 to 1916, he was a gynecologist and professor of gynecology at Medico-Chirug. College. In 1916, he was a professor of gynecology at the University of Pennsylvania.

He invented surgical instruments and appliances.

== Military career ==
Ashton enlisted in the United States Army in 1917 as a major. He was assigned as the regimental surgeon to the 309th Field Artillery, 78th Division. He served in France for 11 months and participated in the St. Mihiel and Meuse-Argonne offensives. He was promoted to lieutenant colonel in February 1919. Ashton was gassed during the Argonne offensive. He retired from service in April 1919.

== Personal life ==
Ashton married Alice Elizabeth Rosengarten on October 5, 1891. They had one daughter named Dorothy.

== Awards and honors ==
Ashton received the Distinguished Service Cross for "extraordinary heroism in action while serving with Medical Detachment, 309th Field Artillery." During the course of treating his patients, he "was subjected to constant explosion of phosgene shells and, in order to perform his duties, he was forced to remove his gas mask."

== Death and legacy ==
Ashton died from pneumonia at his home in Philadelphia on March 30, 1933.

== Publications ==
- Ashton, William Easterly. Questions and Answers on the Essentials of Obstetrics; Prepared Especially for Students of Medicine. Philadelphia: Saunders, 1888. OCLC 19376603
- Ashton, William Easterly. A Text-Book on the Practice of Gynecology for Practitioners and Students. Philadelphia: Saunders, 1905. OCLC 2405270
