= Ernie Ashton =

Australian rules footballer

Personal information
- Full name: Ernest Albert Ashton
- Born: 7 July 1883; Campbell Town, Tasmania
- Died: 1 August 1955 (aged 72); Richmond, Victoria
- Original team: Gaffney's Creek

Playing career^{1}
| Years | Club | Games (Goals) |
| 1904 | Carlton | 1 (0) |
- ^{1} Playing statistics correct to the end of 1904.

Ernest Albert Ashton (Note: This Ernest Albert Ashton, who played for Carlton in 1904, is an entirely different individual from the Ernest Graham Ashton (1870-1946) who played 55 games (11 goals) for Collingwood in the VFA from 1892 to 1895 (see: Ernie Ashton, at Collingwood Forever).) (7 July 1883 – 1 August 1955) was an Australian rules footballer who played with Carlton in the Victorian Football League (VFL).

== Family ==
The son of John Ashton (1829-1889), and Ellen Ashton (1855-1931), née Brown, née Hughes, later, Mrs. William Henry Deakin, Ernest Albert Ashton was born at Campbell Town, Tasmania on 7 July 1883.

He married Isabel Jessie White (1895-1981) in 1928.

== Football ==
Recruited from Gaffneys Creek, Ashton only played in one senior match for Carlton, against Collingwood, at Victoria Park, on 20 August 1904, when he was a replacement for the team's captain, Joe McShane, who had been injured during the week at a team practice session.

== Death ==
He died at Richmond, Victoria on 1 August 1955.
