= Charles Ashton =

Charles Ashton may refer to:

- Charles Ashton (historian) (1848–1899), Welsh literary historian and bibliophile
- Charles Ashton (divine) (1665–1752), scholar and divine
- Charles Ashton (actor) (1884–1968), British actor and novelist
- Charles Ashton (discus thrower) (born 1898), American discus thrower, 3rd at the 1924 USA Outdoor Track and Field Championships

== See also ==
- Ernest Charles Ashton (1873–1956), Canadian soldier
- Charlie Aston (1875–1931), English footballer
