= Recorder of Manchester =

Judicial position in Manchester, United Kingdom

The recorder of Manchester or, since 1971, the honorary recorder of Manchester is a legal office in the City of Manchester, England. The recorder is appointed by the Crown. The recorder of Manchester is also a senior circuit judge of the Manchester Crown Court in the North West Circuit. They are addressed in court as "My Lord" or "My Lady".

== List of recorders of Manchester ==
- 1839 (April–May) John Frederick Foster
- 1839–1865 Robert Baynes Armstrong
- 1865–1893 Henry Wyndham West QC
- 1893–1914 Sir Joseph Francis Leese KC
- 1914–1925 Arthur Jacob Ashton KC
- 1925–1935 Sir Walter Greaves-Lord KC
- 1935–1956 Sir Noel Barré Goldie QC
- 1956–1960 Sir Basil Nield QC
- 1960–1967 (John) Robertson Dunn Crichton QC
- 1967–1971 William Gerard Morris

=== Honorary recorders of Manchester ===
- 1971–1977 Judge Sir William Gerard Morris
- 1977–1982 Judge Sir Rudolph Lyons QC
- 1982–1990 Judge Arthur Miller Prestt QC
- 1990–2003 Judge Sir Rhys Everson Davies QC
- 2003–2008 Judge David Maddison
- 2008–2013 Judge Andrew Gilbart
- 2013– 2020 Judge David Stockdale
- 2020 - Judge Nicholas Dean KC
