= Ashton Music =

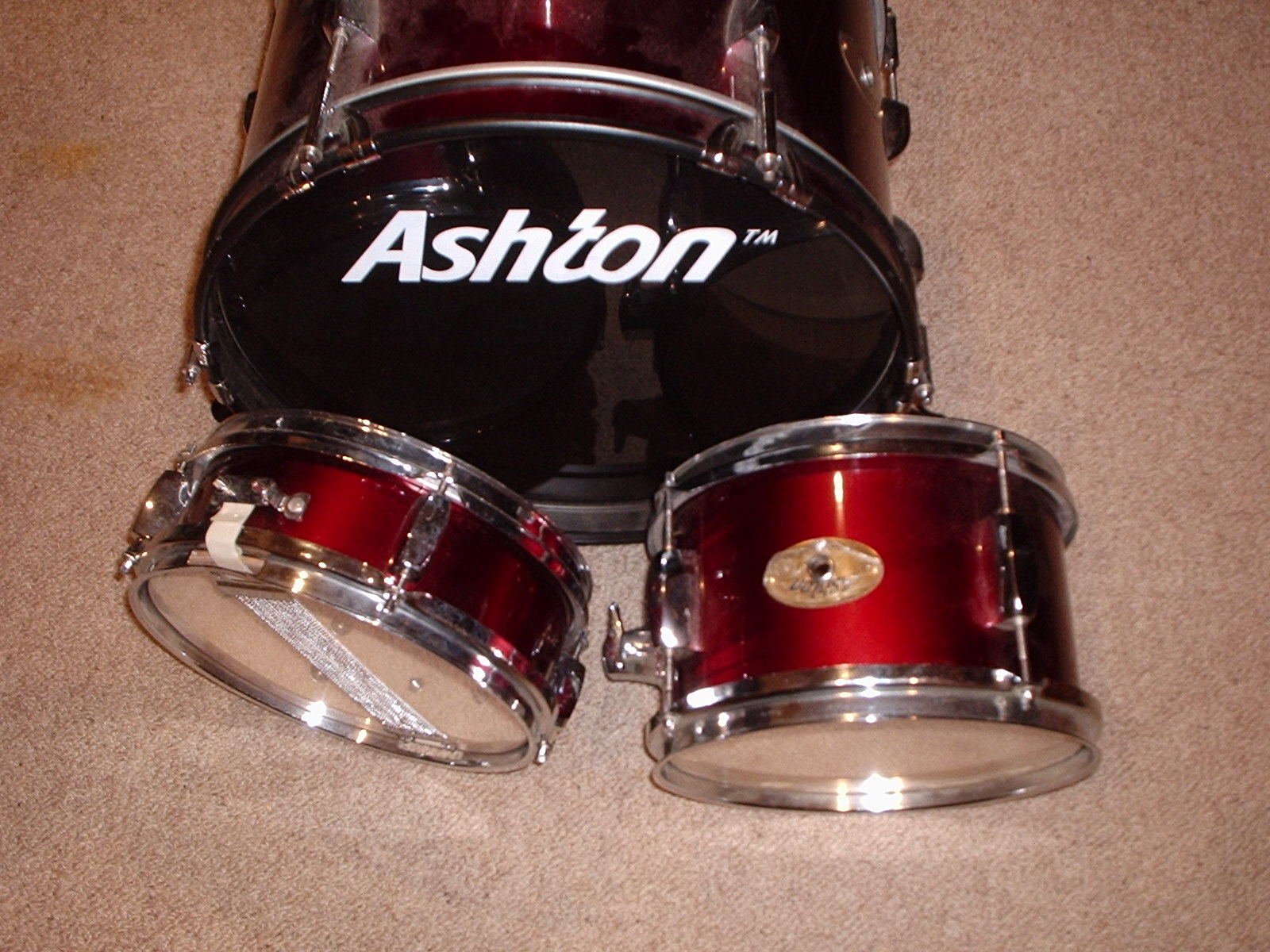
Ashton drum set for a young drummer

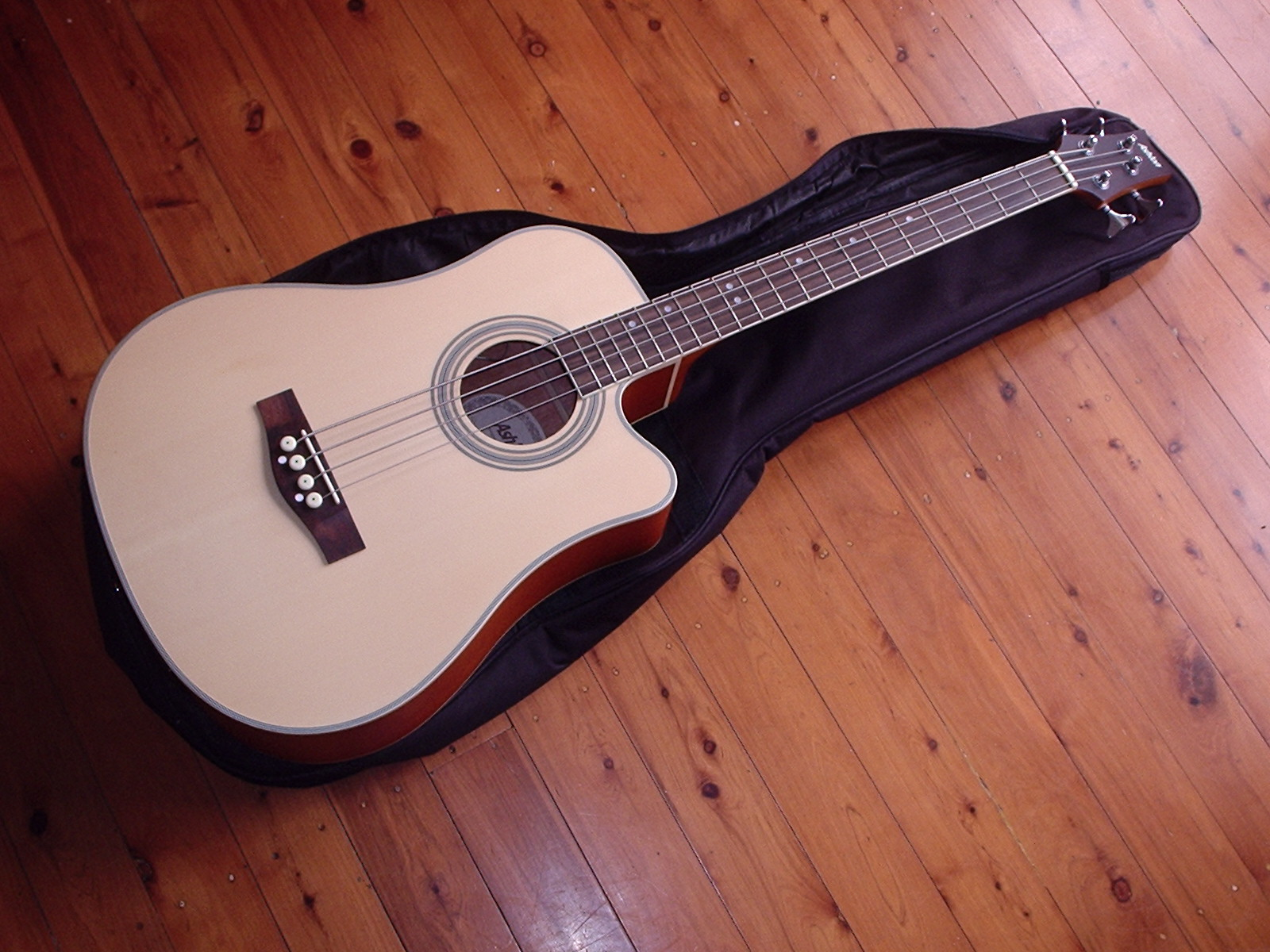
Ashton Acoustic Bass Guitar with built-in pickup, tuner, and DI unit

Ashton Music is a worldwide distributor of musical instruments and associated equipment, focussing particularly on high-quality entry-level lines. Its design headquarters is in Australia, but most of its manufacturing activity is in China.

== See also ==
- List of acoustic guitar brands
- List of electric guitar brands
