= Ashton Observatory =

Public astronomical observatory in Iowa, USA

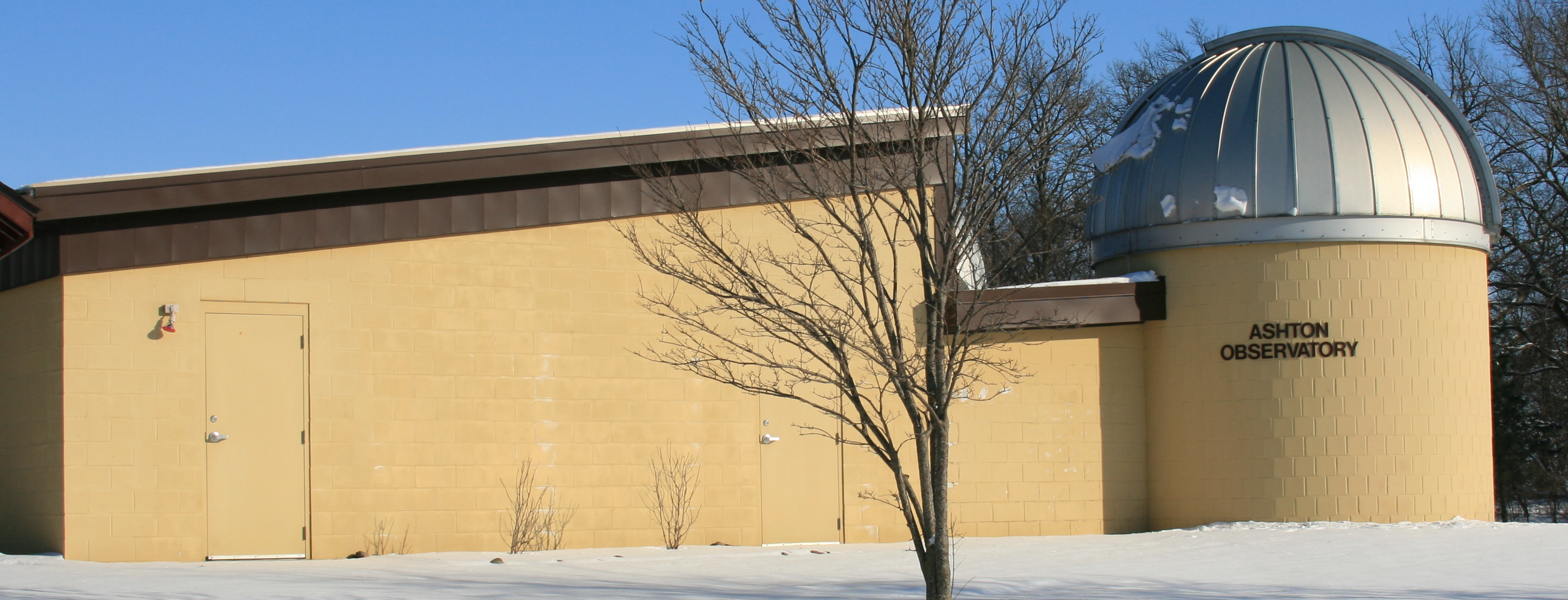
- Organization: The Des Moines Astronomical Society
- Location: 8755 W. 122nd Street North, Mingo, Iowa, 50168
- Coordinates: 41.813359°N 93.288211°W
- Altitude: 260 m (850 ft)
- Established: 1983

Telescopes
- West Dome: 16-inch, f/4.5 Newtonian
- East Dome: 16-inch Meade Reflector

Ashton Observatory is a public astronomical observatory operated by the Des Moines Astronomical Society, in collaboration with Jasper County, Iowa, USA. It is located in Ashton-Wildwood County Park near Baxter, Iowa. Public programs are presented on Saturday evenings in the months of April through October, except for the first Saturday of each month. These public nights were cancelled for 2020, due to the COVID-19 pandemic.

== Facilities ==
=== Building ===
Built in 1983, the observatory originally consisted of two domes connected by a small room. Each dome houses a 16-inch (410 mm) aperture telescope, and can accommodate about one dozen people. In 2002 a 30-by-30-foot (9.1 by 9.1 m) classroom was added to the building's north side, allowing for public presentations to groups of up to 50 visitors. The classroom was badly damaged by the August 2020 Midwest derecho, and is being extensively renovated.

South of the building there are several concrete pads upon which portable telescopes can be deployed to accommodate star parties.

=== Mural ===
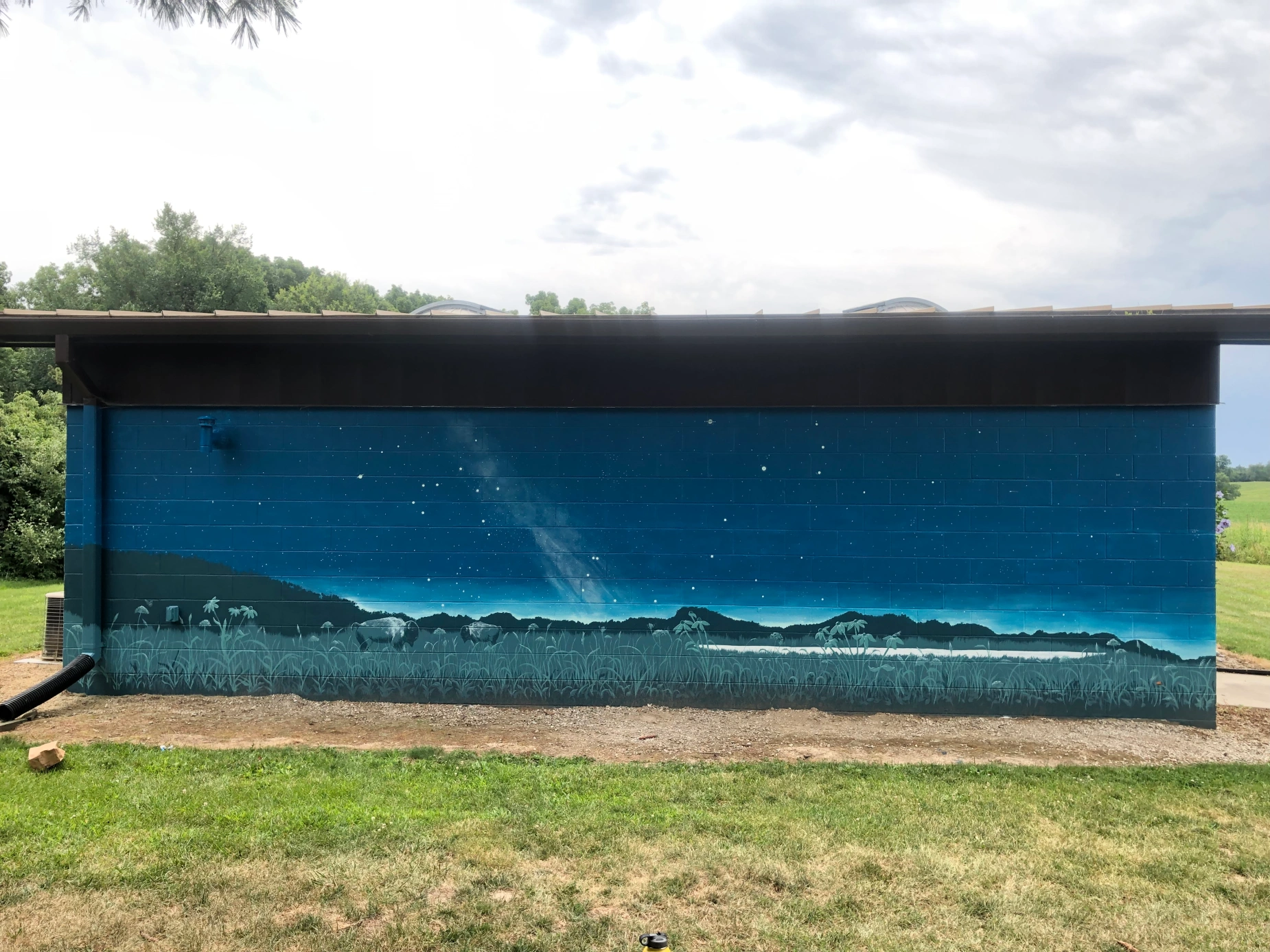
Mural on the Observatory at Ashton Park

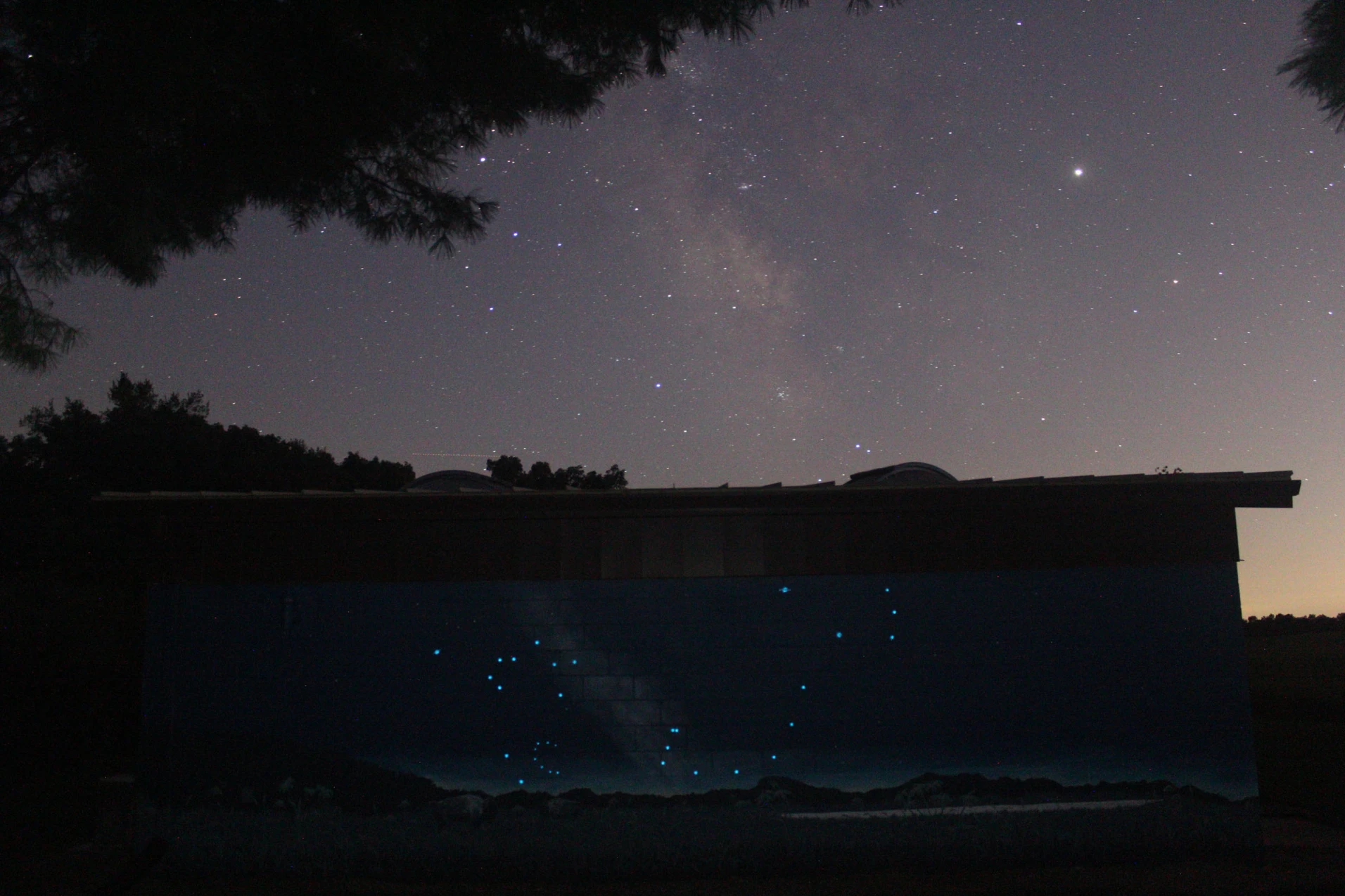
Mural at night

A colorful mural covers the exterior north side of the building. The 270-square-foot (25 m^{2}) mural, commissioned by the Jasper County Conservation Department, depicts the southern night sky as seen from the observatory including the planet positions at the time of the mural's creation (summer 2019) over a prairie scene. The stars and planets were painted with phosphorescent paint, making them visible in the dark after sunset. The mural was created by local artists Lauren Roush and Pauli Zmolek from Newton. Ms. Roush, an art teacher, recruited around forty young students to help in the early stages of painting on site. It was dedicated on September 7, 2019.

== Public nights ==
Public programs are presented every Saturday night during the months of April through October, except for the first Saturday of each month. The programs begin with a lecture on an astronomy-related topic at 8:00 PM CDT. Following the lecture and weather permitting, visitors are shown objects such as the Moon, planets and bright nebulae through the telescopes in the observatory domes, and a few smaller telescopes deployed outside of the observatory. The lecture topics are available posted online early each year.

== Private visits ==
For a small fee, groups may schedule private visits on any night except Saturday night. Groups as large as fifty people can be accommodated. Volunteer telescope operators will support viewing astronomical objects through the observatory's telescopes.

== See also ==
- List of observatories
