= Philip Ashton (cricketer) =

English cricketer (born 1988)

Personal information
- Born: 2 August 1988 (age 38); Cambridge, England
- Source: Cricinfo, 1 April 2017

Philip Ashton (born 2 August 1988) is an English cricketer. He played two first-class matches for Cambridge University Cricket Club between 2009 and 2011.

== See also ==
- List of Cambridge University Cricket Club players
