= Nigel J. Ashton =

English historian

Nigel J. Ashton is professor of international history at the London School of Economics. He is a specialist in contemporary Anglo-American relations and the modern history of the Middle East. His book, Kennedy, Macmillan and the Cold War: the Irony of Interdependence (2002) won the Cambridge Donner Book Prize for excellence in advancing scholarly understanding of transatlantic relations.

Ashton earned his BA and his PhD at Christ's College, Cambridge.

== Selected publications ==
- Eisenhower, Macmillan and the Problem of Nasser: Anglo-American Relations and Arab Nationalism, 1955-59. Macmillan, London, 1996.
- Kennedy, Macmillan and the Cold War: the Irony of Interdependence. Palgrave, 2002.
- King Hussein of Jordan: A Political Life. Yale University Press, New Haven, 2008.
