= Nicholas Ashton =

English cricketer

Personal information
- Full name: Nicholas Charles Ellis Ashton
- Born: 8 October 1904; Scaftworth, Nottinghamshire
- Died: 17 July 1986 (aged 81); Merrow, Surrey
- Source: Cricinfo, 18 March 2017

Nicholas Ashton (8 October 1904 – 17 July 1986) was an English cricketer. He played one first-class match for Oxford University Cricket Club in 1924. He was educated at Repton School and Oriel College, Oxford. He married 6 October 1928 in Paris Carmen Antoinette Dotézac; the religious ceremony took place in the church of la Madeleine in Paris. They had two daughters. During World War II he was a pilot officer in the Royal Air Force.

== See also ==
- List of Oxford University Cricket Club players
