= Leigh Ashton =

South African singer, songwriter, pianist and performer

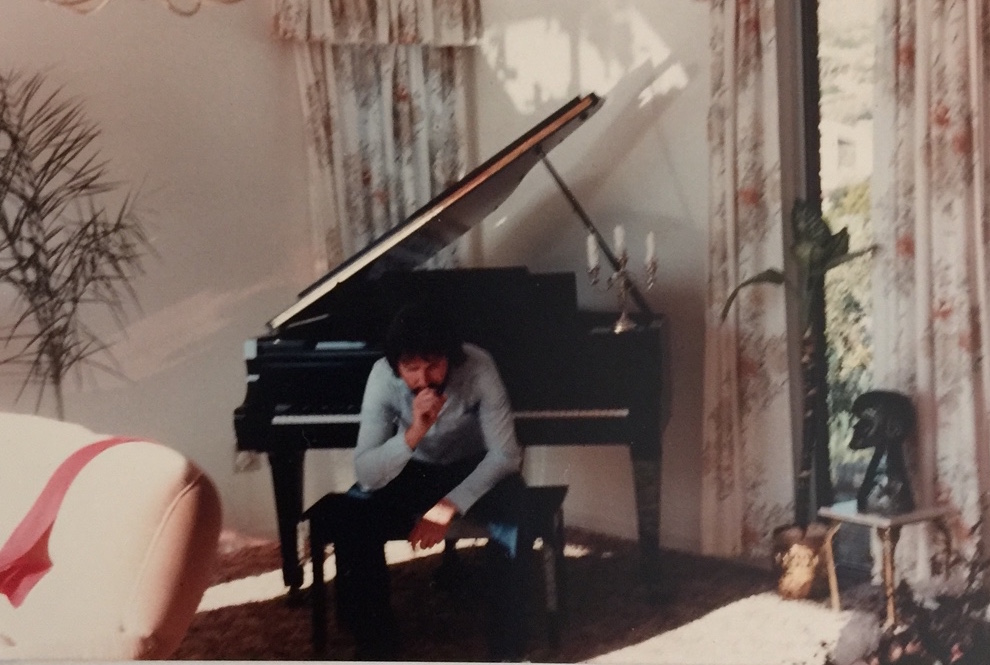

Background information
- Born: Stanford Howard Leigh Ashton; 11 April 1956 (age 70)
- Genres: Pop, Pop rock
- Occupation: Singer-songwriter
- Instruments: Vocals, piano
- Years active: 1975–present
- Label: Nitty Gritty Records[Plum]CBS

Leigh Ashton (born 11 April 1956 in Manchester, England) is a South African singer, songwriter, pianist, performer and recording artist from Johannesburg, South Africa. Ashton was born in Manchester, England, on 11 April 1956 and moved to South Africa at the age of three.

== Career ==
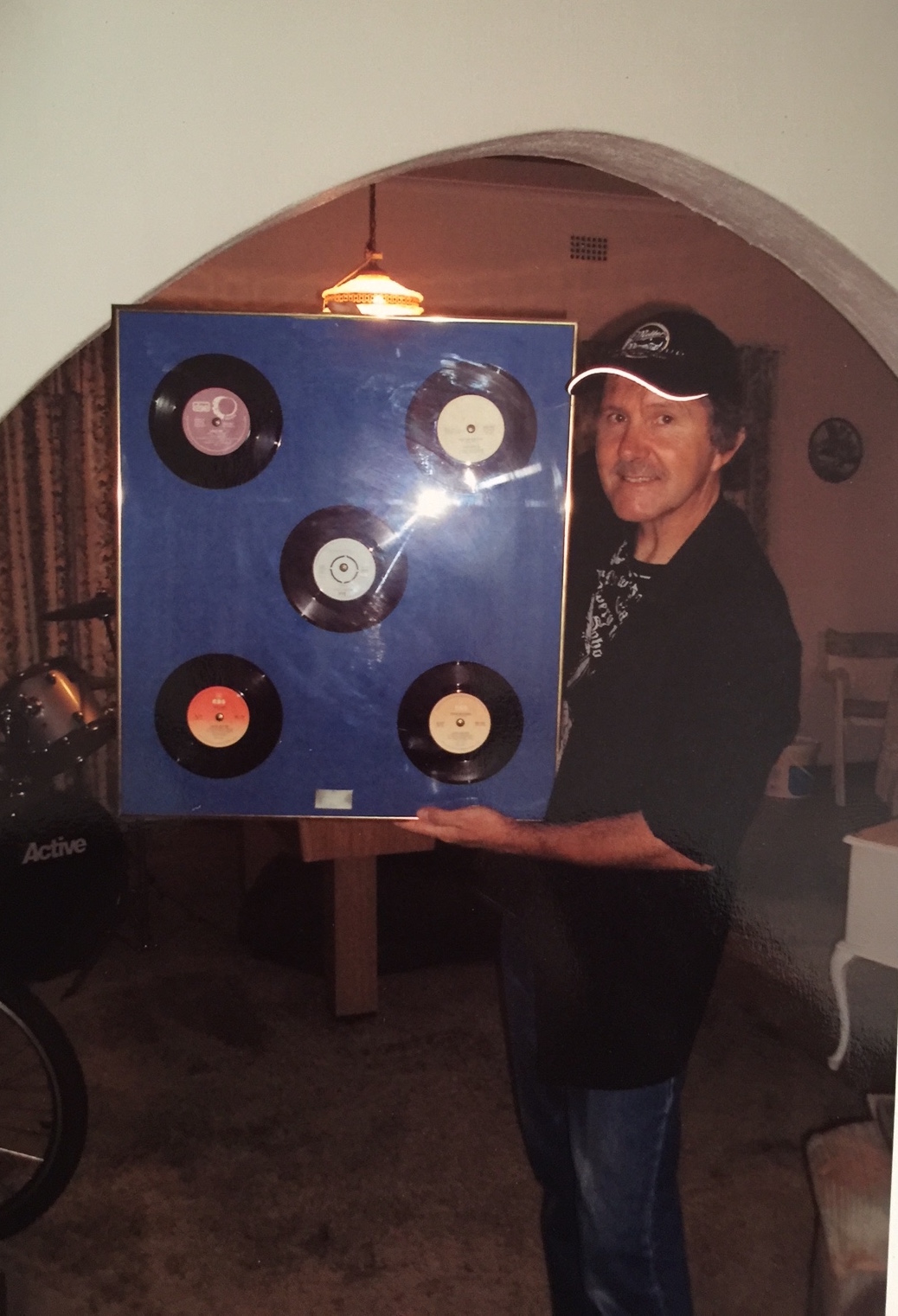
Leigh standing with his records

Ashton was signed to David Gresham Productions as a singer songwriter at 19. His first single "Love Me" was released in November 1975. Ashton worked with some of the best musicians in the country at the time including Trevor Rabin, Julian Laxton and Allan Goldswain. The following year he performed at the very successful "Colosseum Mighty Music Machine" alongside local household names such as Bobby Angel, Bruce Millar, Richard Loring and Sonya Herholdt but he still had yet to achieve his own recognition. In 1977 "Tanya", one of his own songs, reached no 12 on the official SA charts based on sales – competing with ABBA and Leo Sayer. "Tanya" was released on Pye Records later that year in England and Europe. A series of newspaper articles, TV videos, pin up photos and radio interviews followed and he released his third single "Day after Day" another self penned song.

Ashton was later offered a recording contract with GRC part of Gallo on the worldwide CBS label and after liaising and negotiating with both companies changed to GRC to work with Hilton Rosenthal who was producing Juluka at the time. His 4th and 5th singles, "That Girl" and "Christmas Song", were well received by fans and the record industry, but due to an unfortunate misunderstanding between the record companies, arguments ensued and both companies left the singles with no marketing or moral support. Tanya, Teenage Lover, Day After Day, That Girl and Auld Lang Syne are on YouTube. The Stockley Sisters later released a version of "That Boy" in 1977.

Between 1978 and 1984, Ashton concentrated on songwriting and wrote his best songs during this period, including Snowflakes in A Major, Mother, The Park Hobo (which is considered his classic), Give and Take, Nightmare, The Foxtrot, Doubt in My Mind, When You Need a Friend, The Iceman and Keeping It Simple. Keeping It Simple is also the proposed name of his full-length album, containing the previously mentioned songs. The title plays on the fact that most of the songs are written to be played without a full band.

Ashton has been a member of SAMRO for 40 years. He has never been dependent on his music to earn a living and prefers to perform for pleasure. He still performs regularly at various venues around Johannesburg, South Africa.

== Singles ==
"Love Me" – 1975 "Tanya" – 1977 (Reached no 12 on the South African Charts) "Day After Day" – 1977 "That Girl" – 1978 "Christmas Song" – 1978
