= Marvin Ashton =

Marvin Ashton may refer to:

- Marvin J. Ashton (1915–1994), apostle in The Church of Jesus Christ of Latter-day Saints
- Marvin O. Ashton (1883–1946), general authority in The Church of Jesus Christ of Latter-day Saints
