= Alan Ashton =

Alan Ashton may refer to:

- Alan Ashton (politician) (born 1952), former Australian politician
- Alan C. Ashton (born 1942), founder of WordPerfect
- Alan Ashton (rugby league) from List of St Helens RLFC past players
