= Harry Ashton =

Harry or Harold Ashton may refer to:

- Harry Ashton, a character on List of former Coronation Street characters
- Harry Ashton, a character in Forgotten Faces
- Harold Ashton, a character in A Hole in One

== See also ==
- Henry Ashton (disambiguation)
