= Herbert Ashton =

English footballer

Personal information
- Date of birth: 23 May 1885
- Place of birth: Blackburn, Lancashire, England
- Date of death: 28 June 1927 (aged 42)
- Place of death: Harefield, Middlesex, England
- Position: Winger

Senior career*
Years	Team	Apps	(Gls)
- Padiham
- Accrington Stanley
1905–1907	Preston North End	4	(0)
1907–1908	Accrington Stanley		
1908–1915	West Ham United	224	(23)
- * Club domestic league appearances and goals

Herbert Ashton (23 May 1885 – 28 June 1927) was an English footballer who played for Accrington Stanley, Preston North End and West Ham United.

== Career ==
Nicknamed 'Tiddler', Ashton started his footballing career with Padiham. He then played for Accrington Stanley, helping the club to win the Lancashire Combination league in 1905–06, and with Preston North End, where he made four appearances in the Football League.

Ashton signed for West Ham United in 1908, making his debut on 1 September 1908 against Queens Park Rangers; a 2–0 West Ham win. A firm fans' favourite and small in stature he was rarely without support from the fans when things got rough on the pitch, even to the extent of invading the pitch to protect Ashton in a match against New Brompton. Ashton holds the record for the most appearances in the Southern League for West Ham with 224 appearances. Ashton joined the Royal Flying Corps as a mechanic in World War I whilst still playing football for West Ham in the London Combination League.
