= Brian Ashton =

Brian Ashton may refer to:

- Brian Ashton (rugby union) (born 1946), English rugby union player and former head coach of the England national rugby union team
- Brian Ashton (politician) (born 1950), Canadian politician
- Brian Ashton (soccer) (born 1974), Canadian soccer player
