= Family (1976 TV series) =

American drama television series (1976–1980)

- Family title card
- Created by: Jay Presson Allen
- Starring: Sada Thompson; James Broderick; Gary Frank; Kristy McNichol; Meredith Baxter; Quinn Cummings
- Opening theme: John Rubinstein
- Country of origin: United States
- Original language: English
- No. of seasons: 5
- No. of episodes: 86 (list of episodes)

Production
- Executive producers: Leonard Goldberg; Mike Nichols; Aaron Spelling
- Camera setup: Single-camera
- Running time: 50 minutes
- Production companies: Icarus Productions; Spelling-Goldberg Productions

Original release
- Network: ABC
- Release: March 9, 1976 – June 25, 1980

Family is an American drama television series that aired on ABC from March 9, 1976, to June 25, 1980. Created by Jay Presson Allen, the program originated as a six-episode limited series, and strong ratings prompted ABC to commission four additional seasons. The pilot was produced by Mike Nichols, with Leonard Goldberg and Aaron Spelling serving as executive producers throughout the series. Set in suburban Pasadena, California, the show centered on the Lawrence family and their efforts to navigate everyday life, generational conflict, and social change.

Distinguished by its emphasis on psychological realism and sustained character development, Family addressed issues that were uncommon in prime-time network drama during the mid-1970s, including divorce, adolescent sexuality, infidelity, feminism, homosexuality, addiction, and aging. The series frequently portrayed emotional consequences unfolding across multiple seasons, contributing to its reputation as an early example of character-driven ensemble storytelling on American network television.

The series received positive reviews from major newspapers, including The New York Times and the Los Angeles Times, and was commended by organizations such as the National Parent-Teacher Association. It earned multiple Primetime Emmy Award nominations and wins, including acting awards for Sada Thompson, Gary Frank, and Kristy McNichol.

Television historians have described Family as part of a transitional period in American television drama, bridging socially conscious 1970s programming with the serialized, character-centered dramas that emerged in the 1980s and 1990s. Alumni of the series went on to create or develop influential programs such as Thirtysomething and My So-Called Life.

== Overview ==
Family centers on the Lawrences, an upper-middle-class family living in suburban Pasadena. The household includes parents Kate and Doug Lawrence and three of their children: Nancy, Willie, and Letitia (“Buddy”). Five years before the series begins, the family’s youngest son, Timmy, died in an accident—an event that continues to shape family dynamics. Over the course of the series, the family adopts Annie Cooper, the orphaned daughter of close friends.

== Characters ==
=== Main ===
- Kate Lawrence (Sada Thompson) is a homemaker who gradually confronts the constraints of her traditional role. She returns to college and becomes a music teacher, reflecting the changing expectations for women in the 1970s.
- Doug Lawrence (James Broderick) is an attorney with aspirations of becoming a judge. Though devoted to his family, Doug’s work commitments and a prior extramarital affair create lasting strain in his marriage.
- Willie Lawrence (Gary Frank), age 18, is an aspiring writer who leaves high school with his parents’ consent. His romantic relationships and search for direction are central to many episodes.
- Letitia “Buddy” Lawrence (Kristy McNichol), 12, is the youngest Lawrence child at the series’ start. Direct and emotionally perceptive, Buddy’s coming-of-age storylines—including first menstruation and early romantic relationships—became central to the show’s cultural impact.
- Nancy Lawrence Maitland (Elayne Heilveil in the first season, then Meredith Baxter) is the eldest daughter, whose marriage ends after she discovers her husband’s infidelity. At age 24, she moves into the Lawrences' guest house with her infant son, Timmy, and enrolls in law school.
- Annie Cooper (Quinn Cummings), 11, is adopted by the Lawrences in the fourth season after her parents, college friends of Kate and Doug, are killed in a car accident. Academically gifted, Annie struggles to adjust socially and emotionally.

=== Recurring cast ===
Recurring characters include Jeff Maitland (John Rubinstein), Nancy’s ex-husband; Audrey Pfeiffer (Louise Foley), Buddy’s closest friend; and various romantic partners and family acquaintances whose appearances underscore the series’ emphasis on continuity and consequence.

== Storylines ==
A defining feature of Family was its willingness to tackle contemporary social issues—including sexuality, illness, aging, and addiction—subjects that were relatively uncommon on network television at the time.

Sexual content was present from the pilot, in which Nancy discovers her husband's infidelity. Willie's numerous affairs were recurring plot points, while Buddy's storylines addressed both her first menstruation (in the season two opener "Coming of Age") and ongoing dilemmas about premarital sex. Kate faced a breast cancer scare, and her relationship with Doug strained against memories of his previous affair. In separate episodes, a childhood friend of Willie's and a teacher of Buddy's came out as gay; they received support from the Lawrence family while the effects of homophobia were realistically explored.

Family also addressed alcoholism (via episodes involving Doug's sister and Buddy's friend) and dementia: A 1979 episode directed by Joanne Woodward guest-stars Henry Fonda as Doug's father, who is beginning to experience cognitive decline. Two years later, Fonda won an Academy Award for playing a character with cognitive issues in On Golden Pond.

These provocative storylines were typically framed through family discussions rather than sensational conflict, an approach reviewers considered distinctive for network television. Developments were often treated as ongoing adjustments affecting the entire household rather than isolated dramatic events. Family allowed emotional consequences to accumulate across episodes and seasons, revisiting family tensions over time.

Some episodes leaned into melodrama: In a two-parter in the second season, Doug is temporarily blinded in a hit-and-run accident ("Taking Chances") and faces life-threatening surgery. Showrunner Nigel McKeand acknowledged a tension between quality and commercial demands. "The challenge of a weekly series is being entertaining enough to get people to tune in," he told the Associated Press in 1977. "You can have all the messages in the world, but if you don't attract people, it won't do any good."

== Production ==
Family was conceived in 1973 by Aaron Spelling and Leonard Goldberg. Inspired by the groundbreaking documentary-style series An American Family, they envisioned an intimate portrayal of middle-class family life. The pair enlisted Jay Presson Allen (screenwriter of Cabaret and Funny Girl) to write the pilot. Mike Nichols, a friend of Allen who had a pilot production deal with ABC, agreed to produce it. (Nichols' involvement was limited to casting and producing the pilot; he did not participate in the ongoing series.)

Network hesitation about the script being "too good for TV" led to delays. The pilot was shot in February 1975, and five more episodes were commissioned that December. Goldberg assumed executive oversight, with Nigel McKeand and Carol Evan McKeand hired as showrunners. Both had previously written for The Waltons, and they brought a similar emphasis on emotional authenticity and moral complexity to Family, while adopting a contemporary and urban tone. The miniseries began airing in March 1976. Despite minimal publicity, Family attracted strong ratings and reviews, leading ABC to greenlight a weekly series.

Family was filmed primarily on soundstages, with exterior scenes around the Lawrence home staged at a residence at 1230 Milan Avenue in South Pasadena, California. Although Allen originally set the series in Philadelphia’s Main Line, production considerations—including a climate conducive to year-round shooting—necessitated a shift to Southern California. The series’ main set was designed to emphasize realism; producer Mike Nichols insisted that the Lawrence home appear lived-in rather than constructed for camera movement. When Allen objected to the set's initial wall-to-wall carpeting, Spelling had it replaced with hardwood floors to better reflect the family’s traditional and affluent style.

The series' first theme song was written by John Rubenstein, who played Nancy's ex-husband Jeff; the melancholy piano-and-strings arrangement was written as part of a score in which each family member was assigned a musical instrument to accompany their scenes. At ABC's request, Rubenstein wrote a brighter, more upbeat theme for season 2, which was updated for each subsequent season.

In its fifth season, Family underwent a significant behind-the-scenes transition after the McKeands departed. Edward Zwick assumed showrunning duties, leading to a greater focus on adolescent and young adult storylines.

== Episodes and production details ==
Season	Episodes	Originally released	
Season	Episodes	First released	Last released
1	6	March 9, 1976	April 13, 1976
2	22	October 6, 1976	May 3, 1977
3	23	September 13, 1977	May 16, 1978
4	22	September 21, 1978	May 17, 1979
5	13	December 11, 1979	June 25, 1980

== Reception ==
Family raised the profiles of all its main actors, particularly Kristy McNichol and Meredith Baxter Birney.

The show attracted widespread critical acclaim during its original run. Critics praised Family for its realistic quality, contrasting it to escapist ABC shows such as Happy Days, Laverne & Shirley and other Spelling-Goldberg productions such as Charlie's Angels and Fantasy Island. In April 1976, John J. O'Connor of The New York Times called Family "one of the more impressive and most encouraging series to cross a television screen this year." Near the series' end in December 1979, The Miami News called it "the network freak, a finely wrought series, a jewel among the junk at ABC." In May 1980, the Associated Press called Family "the show that was too good for prime time ... a quiet thing of quality in a schedule thick with cops and robbers and bouncy fluff."

Despite the series' occasional adult themes, the National Parent-Teacher Association consistently praised Family. In February 1979, the organization said the show contained "good parenting lessons" and "slightly controversial" but "excellent" content. In the fourth season, some critics took issue with the show's "crisis-of-the-week approach" and sex-related plots.

Although Family had a loyal following, ABC was criticized for failing to promote the show; chiefly, the network never aired summer reruns, which could have expanded the audience. Near the end of the original run, cast members and former showrunners expressed dissatisfaction with the network’s level of support.

== Post-series and legacy ==
Seven years after the series ended, a Family Reunion TV movie was planned for the 1987–88 season, written by Carol Evan McKeand. The plot was to involve the Lawrence children gathering for Kate's remarriage. (James Broderick had died of cancer in 1982, necessitating the storyline.) There was speculation that if the movie's ratings were strong, the series could be revived by ABC. Ultimately, the 1988 writers' strike halted production, and the project was abandoned.

Family is often cited as an early example of character-driven, family-centered television drama. David Jacobs, a writer/producer for seasons two and three, went on to create Dallas and Knots Landing. Fifth-season showrunner Edward Zwick later helmed Thirtysomething, My So-Called Life, and Once and Again.

== Broadcast history and Nielsen ratings ==
Season	Time slot (ET)	Rank	Rating
1975–76	Tuesdays 10 p.m.	34	N/A
1976–77	Tuesdays 10 p.m.	39	N/A
1977–78	Tuesdays 10 p.m.	31	19.8
1978–79	Thursdays 10 p.m. (Sep 1978-Mar 1979); Fridays 8 p.m. (Apr-May 1979)	52	N/A
1979–80	Mondays 10 p.m. (Jan-Feb 1980); Mondays 9 p.m. (Mar 1980); Wednesdays 8 p.m. (June 1980)	61	N/A

In spring 1979, ABC shifted the show to Friday nights, and ratings declined. Consequently, Family was renewed for a final season of 13 episodes as a midseason replacement.

== Awards and nominations ==
Year	Award	Category	Work	Result	Ref.
1976	Directors Guild of America Awards	Outstanding Directorial Achievement in Dramatic Series	Glenn Jordan (for "Rites of Friendship")	Won	
1977	Directors Guild of America Awards	Outstanding Directorial Achievement in Dramatic Series	E. W. Swackhamer (for "Acts of Love: Parts 1 and 2")	Nominated	
1976	Golden Globe Awards	Best Television Series – Drama		Nominated	
1976	Golden Globe Awards	Best Actress in a Television Series – Drama	Sada Thompson	Nominated	
1977	Golden Globe Awards	Best Television Series – Drama		Nominated	
1978	Golden Globe Awards	Best Television Series – Drama		Nominated	
1978	Golden Globe Awards	Best Actress in a Television Series – Drama	Kristy McNichol	Nominated	
1978	Golden Globe Awards	Best Actress in a Television Series – Drama	Sada Thompson	Nominated	
1979	Golden Globe Awards	Best Actress in a Television Series – Drama	Sada Thompson	Nominated	
1976	Humanitas Prize	60 Minute Network or Syndicated Television	Jay Presson Allen (for "Pilot")	Nominated	
1976	Humanitas Prize	60 Minute Network or Syndicated Television	Nigel Evan McKeand and Carol Evan McKeand (for "A Right and Proper Goodbye")	Nominated	
1978	Humanitas Prize	60 Minute Network or Syndicated Television	David Jacobs and Carol Evan McKeand (for "Annie Laurie")	Won	
1978	Humanitas Prize	60 Minute Network or Syndicated Television	Carol Evan McKeand (for "The Princess in the Tower")	Nominated	
1980	Humanitas Prize	60 Minute Network or Syndicated Television	Sally Robinson (for "Thanksgiving")	Won	
1977	Primetime Emmy Awards	Outstanding Drama Series	Leonard Goldberg, Nigel McKeand, Mike Nichols, and Aaron Spelling	Nominated	
1977	Primetime Emmy Awards	Outstanding Lead Actress in a Drama Series	Sada Thompson	Nominated	
1977	Primetime Emmy Awards	Outstanding Continuing Performance by a Supporting Actor in a Drama Series	Gary Frank (for "Lovers and Strangers")	Won	
1977	Primetime Emmy Awards	Outstanding Continuing Performance by a Supporting Actress in a Drama Series	Meredith Baxter Birney	Nominated	
1977	Primetime Emmy Awards	Outstanding Continuing Performance by a Supporting Actress in a Drama Series	Kristy McNichol	Won	
1978	Primetime Emmy Awards	Outstanding Drama Series	Leonard Goldberg, Nigel McKeand, and Aaron Spelling	Nominated	
1978	Primetime Emmy Awards	Outstanding Lead Actor in a Drama Series	James Broderick	Nominated	
1978	Primetime Emmy Awards	Outstanding Lead Actress in a Drama Series	Sada Thompson	Won	
1978	Primetime Emmy Awards	Outstanding Continuing Performance by a Supporting Actress in a Drama Series	Meredith Baxter Birney	Nominated	
1978	Primetime Emmy Awards	Outstanding Continuing Performance by a Supporting Actress in a Drama Series	Kristy McNichol	Nominated	
1978	Primetime Emmy Awards	Outstanding Lead Actor for a Single Appearance in a Drama or Comedy Series	John Rubinstein (for "And Baby Makes Three")	Nominated	
1978	Primetime Emmy Awards	Outstanding Film Editing for a Drama Series	Jim Faris (for "Acts of Love: Part 1")	Nominated	
1979	Primetime Emmy Awards	Outstanding Lead Actress in a Drama Series	Sada Thompson	Nominated	
1979	Primetime Emmy Awards	Outstanding Supporting Actress in a Drama Series	Kristy McNichol	Won	
1980	Primetime Emmy Awards	Outstanding Drama Series	Leonard Goldberg, Aaron Spelling, and Edward Zwick	Nominated	
1980	Primetime Emmy Awards	Outstanding Lead Actress in a Drama Series	Kristy McNichol	Nominated	
1980	Primetime Emmy Awards	Outstanding Lead Actress in a Drama Series	Sada Thompson	Nominated	
1979	Young Artist Awards	Best Juvenile Actress in a TV Series or Special	Quinn Cummings	Nominated	
1979	Young Artist Awards	Best Juvenile Actress in a TV Series or Special	Kristy McNichol	Nominated	
1980	Young Artist Awards	Best Young Actress in a Television Series	Quinn Cummings	Won	

== See also ==
- 1976 in American television
