= Robert Ashton =

Robert Ashton may refer to:

- Robert de Ashton (died 1385), military commander under Edward III of England
- Robert Ashton (historian) (1924–2013), British historian
- Robert Ashton (photographer) (born 1950), Australian photographer and photojournalist
- Robert C. Ashton (c. 1964–2017), American cardiac and thoracic surgeon
- Robert Ashton, character in The Gentleman from Nowhere
- Rob Ashton (born 1976), Canadian trade unionist

== See also ==
- Robert Aston (born 1978), American rapper, known as Skinhead Rob
