= Leigh Ashton (museum director) =

British art historian and museum director

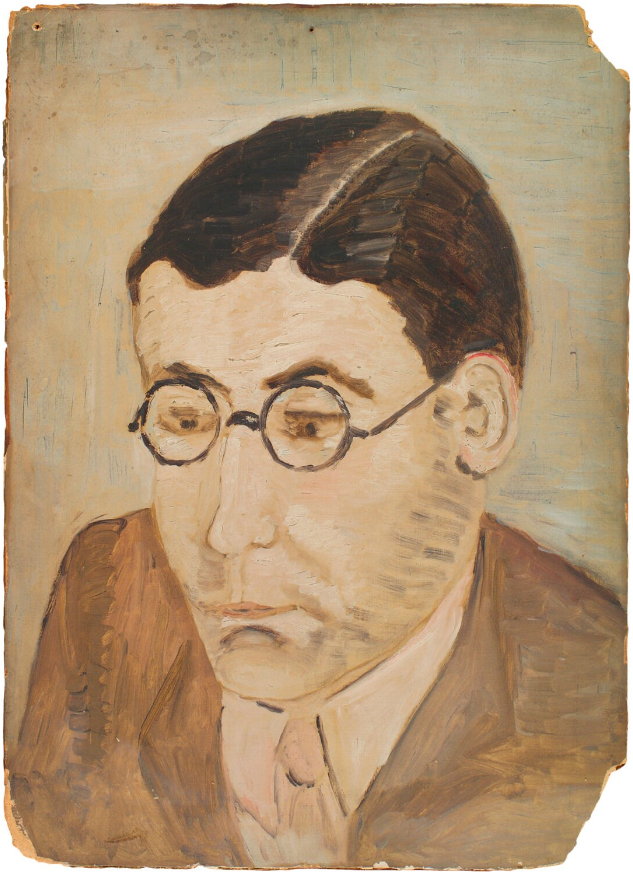
Leigh Ashton by Ray Strachey

Sir Arthur Leigh Bolland Ashton FSA (1897–1983) was a British art historian and director of the Victoria and Albert Museum.

== Early life ==
Ashton was the son of the Arthur Jacob Ashton, KC, Recorder of Manchester. He was educated at Winchester College and Balliol College, Oxford.

== Career ==
In 1945, he was appointed director of the Victoria and Albert Museum, taking over from Eric Maclagan.

Ashton retired in 1955, and was succeeded by Trenchard Cox.

== Personal life ==
In 1952, he married the fashion editor and academic Madge Garland, in a marriage of convenience. They divorced in 1962, and had no children.
