= Ashton Hawkins =

American lawyer and museum board member (1937–2022)

- Born: William Ashton Hawkins; May 11, 1937; New York City, U.S.
- Died: March 27, 2022 (aged 84); White Plains, New York, U.S.
- Education: Harvard University (BA); Harvard Law School
- Occupation(s): Lawyer, museum board member
- Spouse: Johnnie Moore (m. 2013)

William Ashton Hawkins (May 11, 1937 – March 27, 2022) was an American lawyer and museum board member. He served on the boards of the Metropolitan Museum of Art and the Dia Art Foundation. He helped develop the field of art law.

== Early life and education ==
William Ashton Hawkins was born in Manhattan and was raised in Syosset, Long Island. His father, Ashton William Hawkins, was an investment broker. His mother, Kyra (née Schutt) Hawkins, was born in Russia. She fled the country during the communist revolution.

In 1959, Hawkins graduated from Harvard University with a BA degree in political studies. In 1962, he graduated from Harvard Law School.

== Career ==
After his graduation from law school, Hawkins took the Foreign Service exam, planning to have a career as a diplomat. He instead went to work for Cadwalader, Wickersham and Taft, the oldest law firm in New York City. He then worked as an assistant New York state attorney general.

In 1968, Hawkins arrived at the Metropolitan Museum of Art as assistant secretary to the board of trustees, becoming secretary to the museum's board and counsel the next year. As a prominent New York lawyer, Hawkins used connections to figures such as Robert Lehman and the Sackler family to coordinate donations and acquisitions. He helped arrange for the construction of the wing to house the Temple of Dendur.

Hawkins was also chairman of the board of the Dia Art Foundation from 1985 until 1996. During his time there, he assisted with its finances and made it more public-facing. He left when an internal conflict drove him and other senior board members out.

Hawkins retired from full-time work at the Metropolitan Museum of Art in 2001. He then went on to focus on art law. He advocated for stronger protections for art worldwide, particularly in the Middle East after the 2003 American invasion of Iraq.

== Personal life ==
In 1996, Hawkins met Johnnie Moore, an actor and producer. They were married in 2013.

According to his husband, Hawkins died from complications of Alzheimer's disease on March 27, 2022, at an assisted living facility in White Plains, New York.
