= Ashton, Hampshire =

Village in Hampshire, England

Coordinates: 50.96°N 1.23°W

Ashton
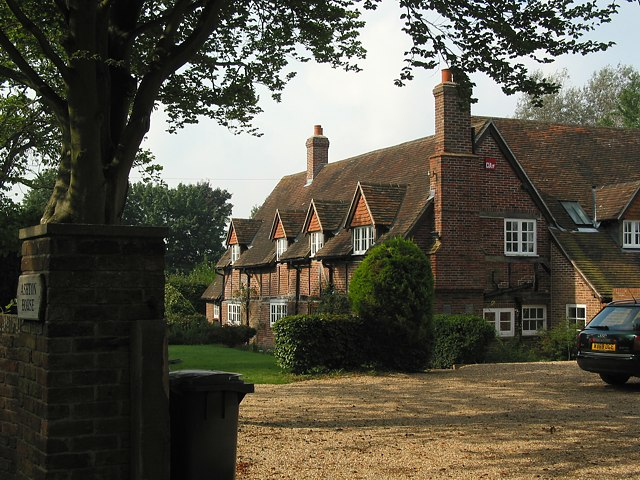
- Ashton House

- Location within Hampshire
- OS grid reference: SU5419
- Civil parish: Bishops Waltham
- District: City of Winchester
- Shire county: Hampshire
- Region: South East
- Country: England
- Sovereign state: United Kingdom
- Post town: Southampton
- Postcode district: SO32
- Dialling code: 01489
- Police: Hampshire and Isle of Wight
- Fire: Hampshire and Isle of Wight
- Ambulance: South Central
- UK Parliament: Winchester

Ashton is a village in Hampshire, England. It consists of mainly substantial properties and is situated just inside the boundary for the South Downs National Park.

== Governance ==
The village is part of the civil parish of Bishop's Waltham and is part of the Bishop's Waltham ward of the City of Winchester non-metropolitan district of Hampshire County Council.

A local pub, The White Horse, closed in 2011.
