= Edwin Ashton =

English footballer (1893–1970)

Personal information
- Date of birth: 9 February 1893
- Place of birth: Hindley, Greater Manchester, England
- Date of death: 1970 (aged 76–77)
- Position: Winger

Senior career*
Years	Team	Apps	(Gls)
1910–1911	Haslingden		
1911–1912	Grimsby Town	8	(0)
1912–1913	Portsmouth		
1913–1914	Haslingden		
1914–19??	Nelson		
- * Club domestic league appearances and goals

Edwin Ashton (9 February 1893 – 1970) was an English professional footballer who played as a winger.
