= Henry M. Ashton =

American politician

Member of the Illinois House of Representatives from the 3rd district
- Succeeded by: Robert R. Jackson

Personal details
- Party: Democratic
- Profession: Politician, lawyer

Henry M. Ashton was a lawyer in Illinois who served in the state legislature. He lost reelection to Robert R. Jackson and contested the outcome in 1913. He was also involved in a dispute over legal fees with Cook County.

He belonged to the City Club of Chicago and the Chicago Bar Association.
