= Percy Ashton (footballer) =

English footballer

Personal information
- Date of birth: 28 March 1909
- Place of birth: Bolton-on-Dearne, England
- Date of death: 1985 (aged 75–76)
- Height: 6 ft 1 in (1.85 m)
- Position: Goalkeeper

Senior career*
Years	Team	Apps	(Gls)
- West Melton Excelsior
1930–1939	Nottingham Forest	179	(0)
- Grantham Road
- * Club domestic league appearances and goals

Percy Ashton (28 March 1909 – 1985) was an English footballer who played as a goalkeeper for Nottingham Forest in the Football League from 1930 to 1939.

== Career ==
Ashton joined Nottingham Forest in 1930 from West Melton Excelsior and played for them until the outbreak of World War II in 1939. He made his Forest debut against Stoke City in September 1930. He joined Grantham Road in 1945.
