= Joseph Ashton =

Joseph Ashton may refer to:

- Joseph Ashton (actor) (born 1986), American actor
- Joe Ashton (Joseph William Ashton, 1933–2020), British politician
