= Peter Ashton =

Peter Ashton may refer to:

- Peter Shaw Ashton (born 1934), British botanist
- Peter Ashton (translator) (fl. 1546)
- Peter Ashton novels, by Clive Egleton
