= David Ashton =

David Ashton may refer to:

- David Ashton (botanist) (1927–2005), Australian botanist and ecologist
- David Ashton (actor) (born 1941), Scottish actor and writer
