= James Ashton (Royal Navy officer) =

Rear-Admiral James Ashton DSO
- Born: 1883
- Died: 30 December 1951 (aged 67–68)
- Military career
- Allegiance: United Kingdom
- Branch: Royal Navy
- Rank: Rear-Admiral
- Conflicts: First World War, Second World War
- Awards: DSO

Rear-Admiral James Ashton DSO (1883–1951) was a senior Royal Navy officer.

== Naval career ==
Born in 1883, Ashton was educated at Bedford School and at the Royal Naval Engineering College, Devonport. He served in the Royal Navy during the First World War and was invested as a Companion of the Distinguished Service Order in 1917. He was appointed as Aide-de-camp to King Edward VIII in 1936, and served at the Admiralty during the Second World War.

Rear Admiral James Ashton died on 30 December 1951, aged 68.
