= Ashton Applewhite =

American writer and activist (born 1952)

Ashton Applewhite (born 1952) is a writer and activist based in Brooklyn, New York.

She is the author of This Chair Rocks: A Manifesto Against Ageism and at the forefront of the emerging movement to raise awareness of ageism and to dismantle it. A co-founder of the Old School Hub, she has been recognized by The New York Times, The New Yorker, National Public Radio, and the American Society on Aging as an expert on ageism. She speaks widely at venues that have included the TED talks mainstage and the United Nations, has written for Harper's, The Guardian, and The New York Times, and is the voice of "Yo, Is This Ageist?" She has been named as a fellow by The New York Times, Yale Law School, and the Royal Society for the Arts.

In 2016, Applewhite joined the PBS site Next Avenue's annual list of "50 Influencers in Aging" as their Influencer of the Year. In 2022, she appeared on HelpAgeUSA's inaugural "60 Over 60" list and on Fe:maleOneZero's first international edition of "40 over 40 – The World's Most Inspiring Women", and received the Maggie Kuhn Award from Presbyterian Senior Services.

In 2022 the United Nations named Ashton one of the Healthy Aging 50: "fifty leaders transforming the world to be a better place to grow older."

Applewhite is also the author of Cutting Loose: Why Women Who End Their Marriages Do So Well, described by Ms. magazine as "rocket fuel for launching new lives." As the pseudonymous author of the Truly Tasteless Jokes series, she was the first person to have four books on The New York Times best-seller list and was a clue on Jeopardy!.

== Works ==
- Applewhite, Ashton. This Chair Rocks: A Manifesto Against Ageism, New York: Celadon Books, March 5, 2019. ISBN 9781250311481
- Applewhite, Ashton. Cutting Loose: Why Women Who End Their Marriages Do So Well, New York: HarperCollins, 1997, ISBN 9780060174552; reissued on 2017 with new introduction by the author, ISBN 9780062680709.
