= Laura Ashton =

Canadian business executive

Laura M. Ashton
- Born: Laura M. Allen
- Citizenship: Canadian
- Education: McGill University Faculty of Arts
- Employer: Low Carbon Advisors
- Spouse: Martin Ashton

Laura M. Ashton (née Allen) is a Canadian executive based in Singapore. She is the co-founder and CEO of Low Carbon Advisors, an advisory firm headquartered in Singapore that helps companies, governments and investors around the world navigate the path to carbon neutrality. Her work in sustainable energy transition also includes independent think tank, the Centre for Strategic Energy and Resources (CSER), where she has been senior vice president since 2023. Ashton has spoken at several marketing- and energy-related events.

== Education ==
Ashton is a member of the Singapore chapter of McGill University's alumni association. In 2019, she completed the Australian Institute of Company Directors International Directors diploma program.

== Career ==
From August 2011 until December 2013, she was vice president, head of marketing for Philips Lighting's Growth Markets unit. She was formerly senior vice president for marketing in Asia-Pacific for Electrolux, as well as president of Electrolux India. Prior to that, she worked in global and regional roles for Shell plc in the Netherlands, England and Singapore.

From 2014 until 2015, she was Asia Pacific Regional Marketing Leader at A.T. Kearney, a management consulting firm.

From August 2015 to October 2017, Ashton served as an independent non-executive director and Chair of the Remuneration and Nominating Committee on the Board of Asia Pacific Digital, an Australian Stock Exchange-listed digital services firm. Asia Pacific Digital was subsequently acquired by Trimantium GrowthOps in August 2018.

She was the Asia Pacific director of business development, marketing & communications for Baker McKenzie, an international law firm, from 2016 to 2019.

Ashton served as chair of the advisory board of New Zealand-based, pan-Asian digital learning and development firm, Capability Group from 2020 until 2023. She is a member of the Singapore Institute of Directors and regularly appears on SID panel discussions on ESG and Governance.

=== Speaking ===
Ashton has spoken at events related to marketing and the energy industry.

- 2013 – iMedia Agency Summit
- 2014 – ad:tech Singapore 2014
- 2015 – Campaign Asia & Content Marketing Institute conference "Content Marketing Singapore"
- 2018 – B2B Marketing Leaders Forum in Singapore
- 2022 – Singapore International Energy Week
- 2023 – World Power Plant Innovation Conference 2023

== Awards and recognition ==
In 2013, The Internationalist, a magazine for advertising and marketing personnel, named Ashton to its Asia 50 list of 50 "pioneering marketers working in one of the world's most diverse and fastest-growing regions who influence activities from Japan to India."

Ashton has been a judge for Haymarket/Campaign Asia's –Asia Pacific Agency of the Year Award" including the 2018 edition, and "Asian Brand Marketing Effectiveness Awards".
