= Jim Ashton =

Australian rules footballer

Personal information
- Full name: James Ellis Ashton
- Born: 12 April 1891; Port Melbourne, Victoria
- Died: 6 September 1961 (aged 70); Coburg, Victoria
- Original team: South Melbourne Districts

Playing career^{1}
Years	Club	Games (Goals)
1917	South Melbourne	4 (0)
- ^{1} Playing statistics correct to the end of 1917.

James Ellis Ashton (12 April 1891 – 6 September 1961) was an Australian rules footballer who played with South Melbourne in the Victorian Football League (VFL).
