= Harry Aston (footballer, born 1881) =

English footballer

Personal information
- Full name: Henry John Aston
- Date of birth: 2 February 1881
- Place of birth: Redditch, England
- Date of death: 4 February 1938 (aged 57)
- Place of death: Bromsgrove, England
- Position: Centre forward

Senior career*
Years	Team	Apps	(Gls)
1904–1905	West Bromwich Albion	25	(9)
1905–1907	Walsall		
1907–1908	Willenhall Swifts		
1908–1910	Clifton Victoria		
- * Club domestic league appearances and goals

Henry John Aston (2 February 1881 – 4 February 1938) was an English footballer who played as a centre forward. He was born in Redditch and attended Astwood Bank School. After playing amateur football for several clubs, Aston served with the 2nd Battalion Durham Light Infantry, before joining the Royal Artillery. He became a professional footballer in February 1904 when West Bromwich Albion paid for him to be released from the army, making his debut in April of that year, against Derby County. Aston scored 10 goals in 26 appearances for Albion, before transferring to Walsall in June 1905. He later played for Willenhall Swifts and Clifton Victoria. Aston died in Bromsgrove in 1938.
