= Roger Ashton =

English Roman Catholic layman and martyr

Roger Ashton (executed at Tyburn, 23 June 1592) was an English Roman Catholic soldier. He is a Catholic martyr and is commemorated on 23 June.

== Life ==
He was the third son of Richard Ashton of Croston, in Lancashire. In 1585 he had gone to serve in the Low Countries under the Earl of Leicester against the Spanish. William Stanley having been placed on guard over the town of Deventer, which had revolted from the Spaniards, he, with the assistance of Ashton, gave the town back to Spain and went over to their side (29 January 1587). Cardinal William Allen published a "Defence" of this act in the form of a letter addressed to one "R.A.". Stanley next entrusted to Ashton the task of bringing over his wife from Ireland, but she was already under arrest.

At the close of the year 1587 he returned to England and was apprehended in Kent with a marriage dispensation; and thereby acknowledging the authority of the Holy See in all matters spiritual. Richard Challoner says it was a papal dispensation to marry his second cousin,

In January, 1588, he was in the Tower of London. Ill towards the close of the year, he was transferred to easier confinement in the Marshalsea. From this he managed to escape and fled to his brothers in Lancashire. He was arrested later, at South Shields, near Newcastle, while trying to escape overseas.

Transferred to Durham and York, he was tried and sentenced at Canterbury. He was hanged, drawn, and quartered; his indictment is not preserved. He died a "very resolute" Catholic, making profession of his faith.

Roger Ashtonwas declared Venerable by Pope Leo XIII in 1886.
