= Baron Ashton (disambiguation) =

Baron Ashton may refer to

- James Williamson, 1st Baron Ashton (1842–1930)
- Baron Ashton of Hyde
  - Thomas Gair Ashton, 1st Baron Ashton of Hyde (1855–1933)
  - Thomas Henry Raymond Ashton, 2nd Baron Ashton of Hyde (1901–1983)
  - Thomas John Ashton, 3rd Baron Ashton of Hyde (1926–2008)
  - (Thomas) Henry Ashton, 4th Baron Ashton of Hyde (born 1958)

== See also ==
- Catherine Margaret Ashton, Baroness Ashton of Upholland (born 1956)
- Baron Ashtown
- Ashton (disambiguation)
