= Thomas Ashton =

Thomas Ashton may refer to:

- Thomas Ashton (schoolmaster) (died 1578), English clergyman and schoolmaster
- Thomas Ashton (divine) (1716–1775), English cleric
- Thomas Ashton (cotton spinner) (1841–1919), British trade union leader
- Thomas Ashton (trade unionist) (1844–1927), British trade unionist and member of the Privy Council
- Thomas Ashton (industrialist) (1818–1898), English cotton manufacturer and philanthropist
- Thomas Ashton (died 1831), assassinated mill owner
- Thomas Ashton, 1st Baron Ashton of Hyde (1855–1933), British industrialist, philanthropist, Liberal
- Thomas Ashton, 2nd Baron Ashton of Hyde (1901–1983), eldest surviving son of Thomas Ashton, 1ste Baron Ashton
- Thomas Ashton, 3rd Baron Ashton of Hyde (1926–2008), eldest son of Thomas Ashton, 2nd Baron Ashton
- T. S. Ashton (Thomas Southcliffe Ashton, 1899–1968), English economic historian
- Tom Ashton, British musician

== See also ==
- Thomas de Ashton (disambiguation)
- Thomas Aston (disambiguation)
