= De Ashton =

De Ashton is a surname. Notable people with the surname include:

- John de Ashton (disambiguation), multiple people
- Ralph de Ashton (1421–1486), English officer of state under Edward IV
- Robert de Ashton (died 1385), English civil, military, and naval officer
- Thomas de Ashton (disambiguation), multiple people

== See also ==
- Ashton (disambiguation)
