= Margaret Ashton =

English suffragist, politician, pacifist and philanthropist (1856–1937)

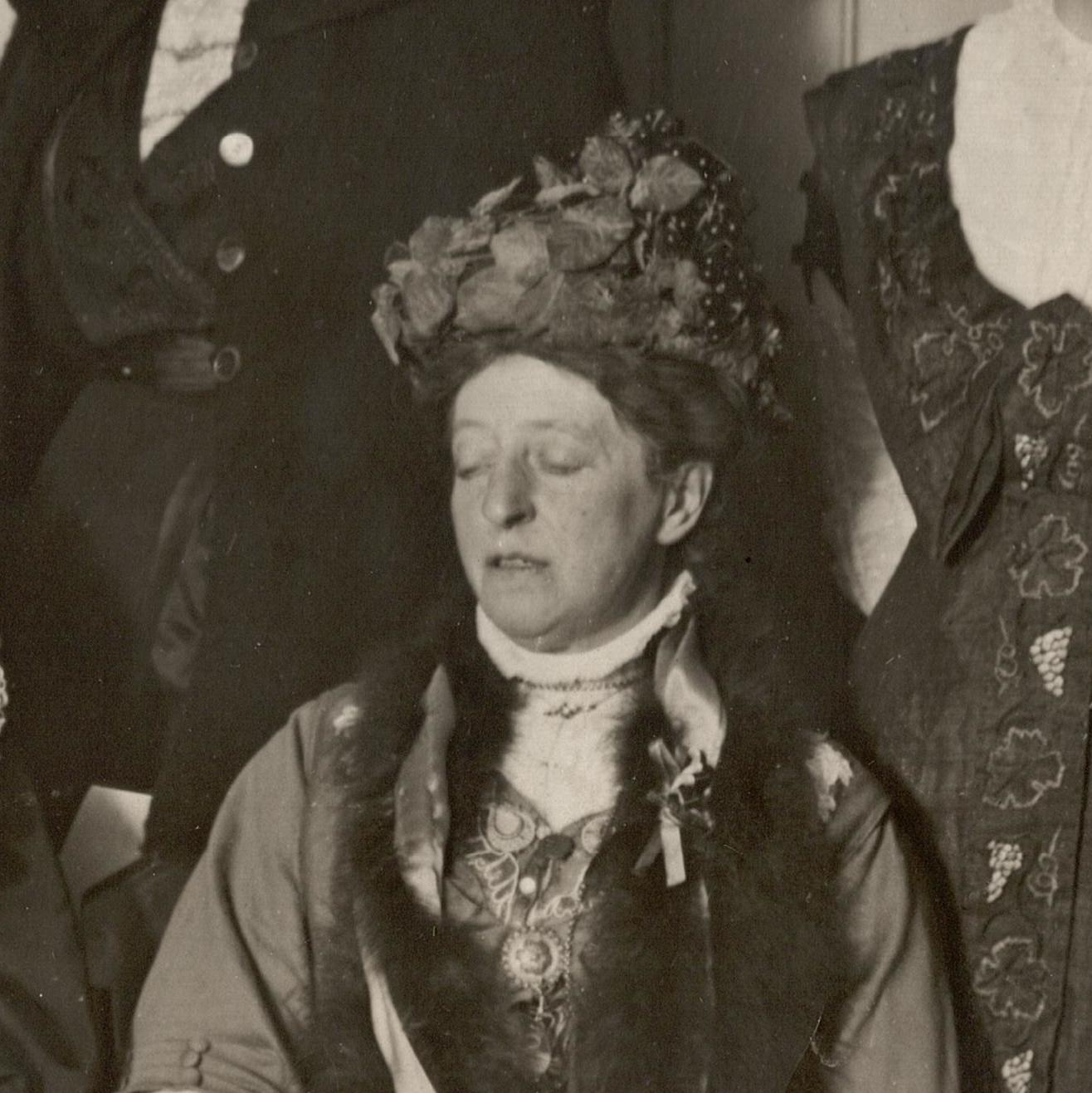
- At the Free Trade Hall in 1909
- Born: 19 January 1856; Withington, Manchester, Lancashire, England
- Died: 15 October 1937 (aged 81)
- Occupation: Politician
- Organization: Women's International League for Peace and Freedom (WILPF)
- Known for: First woman city councillor for Manchester
- Father: Thomas Ashton
- Relatives: Thomas Ashton, 1st Baron Ashton of Hyde (brother); Thomas Ashton, 2nd Baron Ashton of Hyde (nephew)

Margaret Ashton (19 January 1856 – 15 October 1937) was an English suffragist, local politician, pacifist and philanthropist. She was the first woman city councillor for Manchester.

== Career ==
Margaret Ashton was born on 19 January 1856 in Withington, Manchester. She was daughter of cotton manufacturer Thomas Ashton (1818–1898) and his wife Elizabeth Ashton (née Gair). Ashton was the first woman to run for election to Manchester City Council, and in 1908 became the first woman city councillor when she was elected Councillor for Manchester Withington.

As a member of Manchester's public health committee and chair of the maternity and child welfare subcommittee, Ashton endorsed municipal mother and baby clinics and promoted free milk for babies and new mothers. In 1914 she founded the Manchester Babies Hospital with Dr Catherine Chisholm (1878–1952).

With the outbreak of the first world war in 1914, Ashton was amongst the internationalist minority who split from the NUWSS and the suffragette movement. She was a signatory of the 'Open Christmas Letter', a call for peace addressed in sisterhood "To the Women of Germany and Austria", which was published in Jus Suffragii in January 1915. She started a Manchester branch of the Women's International League for Peace and Freedom (WILPF).

In 1920 the Women's Farm and Garden Union established a set of small holdings in 1920 for women in Surrey. The initial funders were Margaret Ashton who found £5,000 and Sydney Renee Courtauld who lent £4,000.

== Legacy ==
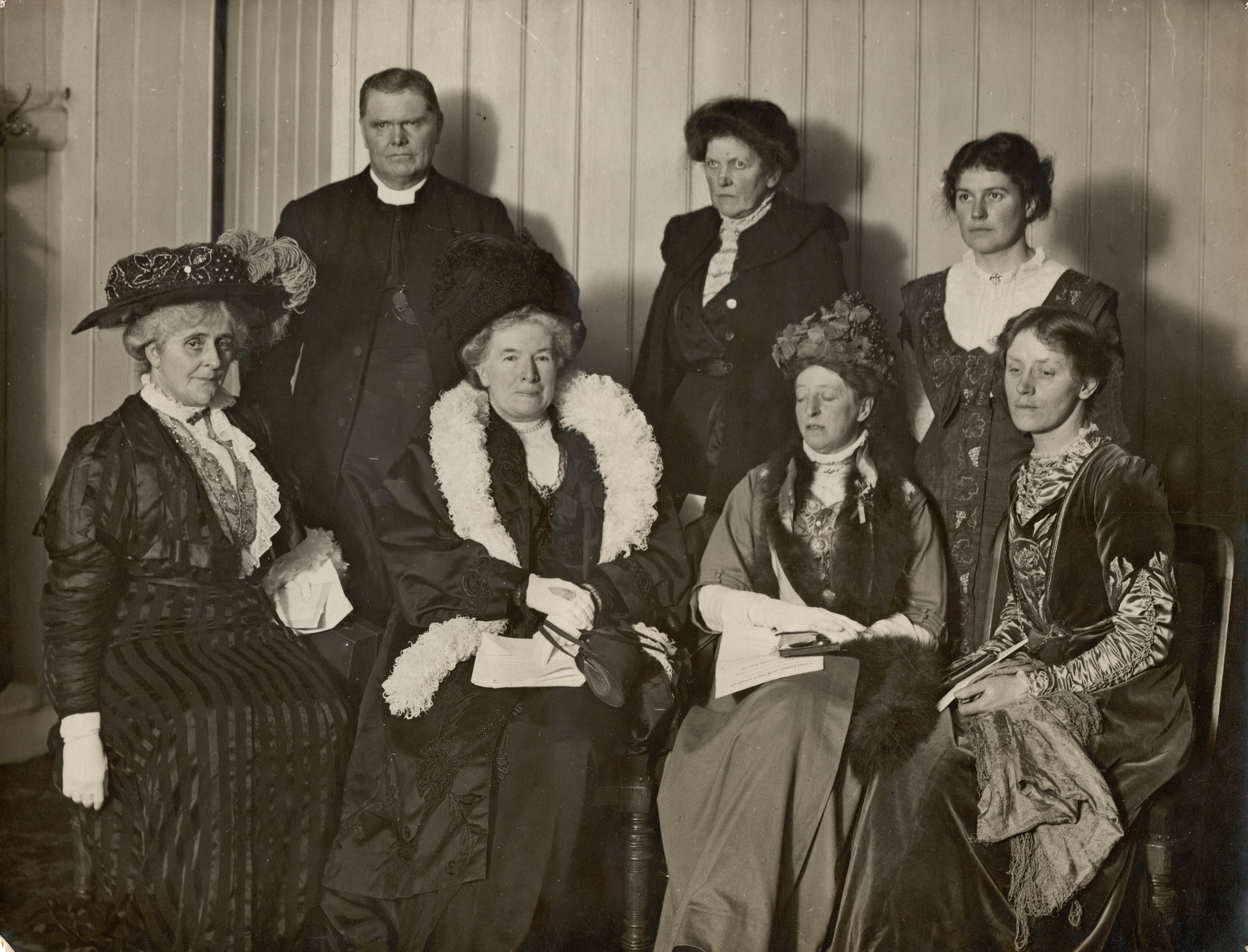
A debate at the Free Trade Hall over suffrage. Ashton is third from left, front row

In 1938, some friends and admirers of Ashton formed a memorial committee which funded two activities:

- A seat in the Manchester Town Hall for the use of the Lady Mayoress and other guests. On the reverse of the seat was a table recording her accomplishments.
- A bi-annual memorial lecture series, organised by the Victoria University of Manchester, alternating between the university and the Corporation of Manchester. The first lecture, on the Victorians, was given by Mary Stocks, the principal of Westfield College on 20 March 1941.

In 1982, the Harpurhey High School for Girls was re-opened as Margaret Ashton Sixth Form College.

Ashton's name and picture (and those of 58 other women's suffrage supporters) are on the plinth of the statue of Millicent Fawcett in Parliament Square, London; it was unveiled in 2018.

Ashton was one of six women on a shortlist for a new public statue in Manchester, but lost out to Emmeline Pankhurst in the public vote.

In 2022, a mural depicting Ashton, by artist Emma Bowen, was painted on a wall at Cavendish Community Primary School in West Didsbury. Ashton had laid the school's foundation stone in 1904.

== See also ==
- List of peace activists
