= Marlborough House Vinehall School =

Coordinates: 50.958°N 0.492°E

Location
- Vinehall Street, Mountfield, Robertsbridge, East Sussex, TN32 5JL; England

Information
- Former names: Vinehall School, Marlborough House School
- Type: Independent day and boarding school
- Motto: Pro Allis Optimum Agere (To do the best for the benefit of others)
- Religious affiliation: Church of England/Interdenominational
- Established: 1874 (Marlborough House); 1938 (Vinehall)
- Headmaster: Eddy Newton (Since 2025)
- Gender: Co-educational
- Age: 2 to 13
- Enrolment: 297 (approx.)
- Houses: Ashton; Paxton; Rushton; Saxton
- Website: www.mhvschool.co.uk

Marlborough House Vinehall School is a co-educational private day, boarding school, and nursery located on Vinehall Street, in the town of Robertsbridge, East Sussex. It takes children from ages 2 to 13.

Vinehall School received a full inspection by the Independent Schools Inspectorate in February 2018. Vinehall School was inspected by Ofsted in 2011. Marlborough House School was last inspected by the Independent Schools Inspectorate in 2023.

On 17 May 2022, Vinehall School became part of the Repton group of schools.

In October 2024, Vinehall and Marlborough House schools announced they would be merging into one school. The merger was completed in September 2025 and the school was renamed Marlborough House Vinehall School. It continues to operate on the Vinehall site, with the Marlborough House site in Hawkhurst closing in July 2025.

The current headmaster is Eddy Newton, who was headmaster of Marlborough House School prior to the merger.

== History ==
=== Vinehall School ===
In the 1830s, Vinehall was owned and remodelled by Tilden Smith Esq., a partner of the Hastings Old Bank. Smith ended up bankrupt in 1857, and the estate was sold to Felix Champney for £20,170 (equivalent to £1,971,987 in 2025). In October 1860, Champney sold the estate to William Rushton Adamson for £35,700 (equivalent to £3,753,042 in 2025); the house was renamed Rushton Park.

In 1902, the estate was sold to Thomas Gair Ashton, who later became the Baron Ashton of Hyde. When Lady Ashton died in 1938, the estate was sold to John Jacoby. Vinehall started its life as a country preparatory school for boys aged five to fourteen years, opening with six local children, with Jacoby as the first headmaster.

During the Second World War, the school was evacuated to Killerton Park in Devon along with Battle Abbey School, a local girls’ school that Jacoby's mother, Mary Jacoby, was headmistress at. The school's buildings were home to Canadian troops during the war. The school returned to Robertsbridge in September 1945 after the war. In 1946, the estate was bought by Major Tom Stuart-Menteath and his wife Kitty. He ran the school until 1957, at which point it was handed down to his stepson Richard Taylor and his wife Patricia. Several new buildings were added, including a new classroom block, science labs, a theatre, and an indoor swimming pool.

Richard and Pat Taylor handed the school over to their son-in-law, David Chaplin, in 1977. He and their daughter, Sally, remained until 2002. In the recent past, the purpose-built Pre-Prep was added, as were a theatre, sports hall, and in 2000, the Millennium Library and classroom complex. In 2002, the Chaplins handed over the school to Julie Robinson, who was head until the summer of 2010. Geoffrey Whitehead became acting head until January 2011, when Richard Follett took over as headmaster. He left in the summer of 2017 and was replaced by Joff Powis, who became senior deputy head after the merger with Marlborough House in September 2025.

Three of the school's four houses are named after historical figures significant to the estate's history: Rushton after William Rushton Adamson (and Rushton Park, the former name of the estate), Ashton after Thomas Ashton, and Paxton after the gardener and architect Joseph Paxton, who it is "believed" designed the grounds. Saxton was created later in the 20th century to accommodate rising pupil numbers, and its name bears no historical significance.

In recent years, the school theatre has been refurbished and reopened as the Chaplin Theatre in honour of David Chaplin, who became headmaster on Richard Taylor's retirement.

=== Marlborough House School ===
In 1874, Sophia Lombe White opened a small boarding school for boys aged 8–13 on the Sussex Coast in a building named Marlborough House.

In 1930, the founding White family purchased the New Lodge estate in Hawkhurst from the Hardcastle family and moved the school there. They also adopted the Hardcastle family crest as the school's crest.

The school had four houses: Awdry, Dunbar, Egan and Hawkings, named after the first Marlborough House School families who lost a son in the Great War.

The core of the school was in the ‘main building’ – an 18th-century country house. This building was adapted for 21st-century schooling and complemented with new buildings including the Pre-Prep, Harrison Building and Sports Hall. The school grounds included an outdoor swimming pool, shooting range, Forest school, play areas, an all-weather playing field and tennis courts.

The Hawkhurst site closed in July 2025 as a result of the merger with Vinehall School, moving all operations to the Vinehall site. The school's houses were also retired in favour of Vinehall's existing houses.

== Notable alumni ==
=== Vinehall ===
- Tom Avery, polar explorer
- Tom Chaplin, Tim Rice-Oxley, and Richard Hughes - members of Keane
- Sir Andrew Gilbart, High Court Judge (q.v.)
- Jules Knight, singer, and actor
- Sir Tim Smit, founder of The Eden Project

=== Marlborough House ===
- Rev. W. V. Awdry, author of Thomas the Tank Engine
- David Gower, former England cricket captain
- Stephen Poliakoff, playwright, director and scriptwriter
- Peter Vansittart, novelist
- Zoe Hardman, radio and television presenter
- Ben Fox, field hockey player
