= Nesta Wells =

British forensic physician (1892–1986)

Nesta Helen Wells (9 July 1892 – 17 February 1986) was a British physician, and police surgeon (now known as forensic medical examiner). When she was appointed in 1927, she was the first female police surgeon in the United Kingdom.

== Early life ==
Nesta Helen Perry was born on 9 July 1892 in Wolverhampton, Staffordshire (now West Midlands), England to Herbert Edward Perry, and Edith Grafton Hopkins. Her father was a mineral water manufacturer, and later became a Unitarian minister. She studied medicine at the University of Manchester, graduating in 1916. After graduating, she worked as a house officer at Nottingham General Hospital.

== Career ==
She returned to Manchester and worked in a number of local hospitals including Pendlebury Children's Hospital, Beckett Hospital in Barnsley, and the Salvation Army's maternity hospital, Crossley Hospital. She later worked at the Manchester Babies' Hospital (renamed in 1935 as Duchess of York Hospital for Babies) as an honorary registrar. Founded in 1914 by Catherine Chisholm, the hospital's doctors were all women. Perry later became an honorary physician at the hospital.

She was an early member of the Medical Women's Federation, which was founded in 1917. During the 1920s to 1940s, the organisation campaigned for the introduction of women as police surgeons to examine victims of sexual assault. Manchester City councillor Annie Lee joined the Watch Committee who oversaw the Manchester City Police, and in 1927 convinced the committee to appoint a woman police surgeon specifically to examine women and children. On 1 August, Wells was appointed to the role, the first in the United Kingdom.

Her part-time role primarily involved the examination of women and children who had been suspected of being victims of sexual assault, rape, and incest. However, she was also responsible for the health of the city's women police officers. Wells also continued to campaign for more female police surgeons and police officers.

She retired in 1954. In 1958, Wells published a survey in the British Medical Journal of 1,959 suspected sexual offence cases which had been referred to her. In a significant majority of the cases, the victims were under the age of 16.

== Personal life ==
She married Lionel Wraith Wells in 1923. He was a mechanical engineer. They had two daughters.

Wells died on 17 February 1986 in the village of Holmes Chapel, Cheshire.
