= Minister of State for Home Affairs =

Minister of State for Home Affairs may refer to

- Minister of State for Home Affairs (United Kingdom)
- Parliamentary Under-Secretary of State for the Home Department, UK
