= Darwell Reservoir =

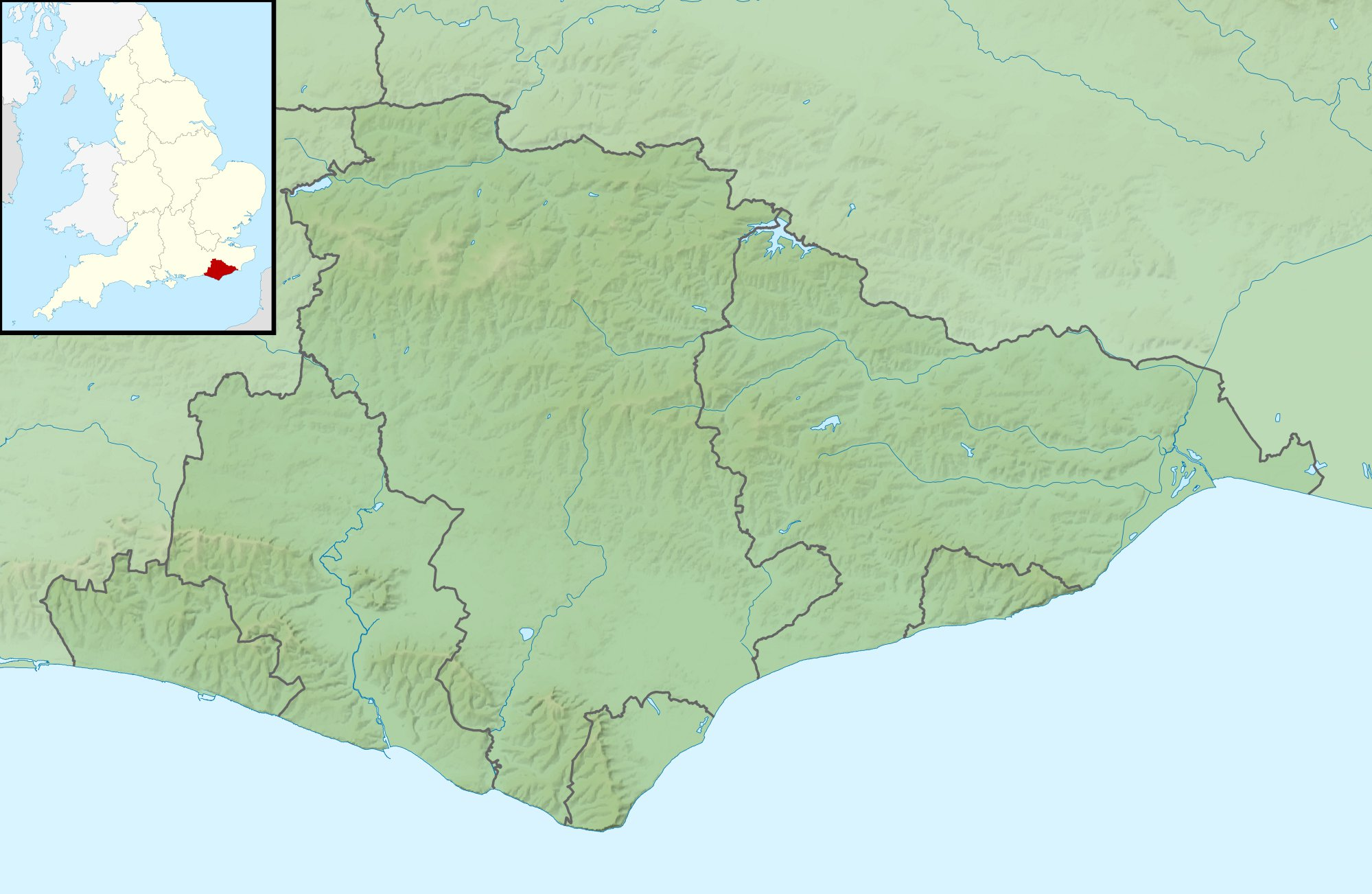
- Location within East Sussex
- Location: East Sussex
- Coordinates: 50°57′55″N 0°26′35″E
- Type: reservoir
- Basin countries: United Kingdom
- Surface area: 156 acres (63 ha)
- Water volume: 4,730 megalitres (3,830 acre⋅ft)

Darwell Reservoir lies to the west of Mountfield, East Sussex, England. The reservoir provides water for Southern Water customers. The reservoir covers around 156 acres (63.4 hectares) and is just over a mile long. Work began on its construction in about 1937 and it was completed in 1949. It was officially opened by the Duke of Norfolk on 23 October the following year. When it was filled, 9 cottages, including Birchford Cottages, Darwell Furnace Farm and cottages associated with it, were lost under the water. A pipeway was laid in the 1980s which takes water to Beauport Park to supply Hastings.

The Darwell Reservoir is surrounded by ancient woodland, including the Darwell Wood a Site of Special Scientific Interest (SSSI). Which is a broadleaved woodland of 92.9 acres (37.6 hectares), which is dissected by streams draining into the reservoir from the north.

Cranbrook and District Angling Club had the sole fishing rights at the reservoir.
