= John Ashton =

John Ashton may refer to:

== Entertainment ==
- John Ashton (composer) (1830–1896), Welsh musician
- Will Ashton (John William Ashton, 1881–1963), British-Australian artist and art director
- John Ashton (actor) (1948–2024), American actor
- John Ashton (musician) (born 1957), British musician, songwriter and record producer
- John Ashton (music publisher), merchant and music publisher in Boston, Massachusetts

== Other ==
- John Aston (preacher) (or Ashton; fl. 1382), British cleric
- John Ashton (Jacobite) (died 1691), British conspirator
- John Ashton (architect) (1860–1953), American architect
- John Ashton (bishop) (1866–1964), Australian Anglican bishop
- John Ashton (public health director) (born 1947), British professor of public health
- John Ashton (diplomat) (born 1956), British Special Representative for Climate Change
- John G. Ashton (born 1935), politician in Alberta, Canada
- John Rowland Ashton (1917–2008), English educationist based in Sweden
- Jon Ashton (born 1982), English footballer

== See also ==
- John de Ashton (disambiguation)
- John Assheton (disambiguation)
- John Aston (disambiguation)
