= Thomas Aston =

Thomas Aston may refer to:

- Thomas Aston (died 1413), MP for Staffordshire
- Thomas Aston (died 1553) (c. 1483–1553) of Aston, was a Sheriff of Cheshire in 1551
- Sir Thomas Aston, 1st Baronet (1600–1645), English politician
- Sir Thomas Aston, 3rd Baronet (1656–1725) of the Aston baronets
- Sir Thomas Aston, 4th Baronet (c. 1705–1744) of the Aston Baronets
- Tommy Aston (born 1876), English footballer

== See also ==
- Thomas de Aston (died 1376), canon of Windsor
- Thomas Ashton (disambiguation)
