= Glottenham Castle =

Former castle in East Sussex, England

Coordinates: 50°58′21″N 0°27′28″E

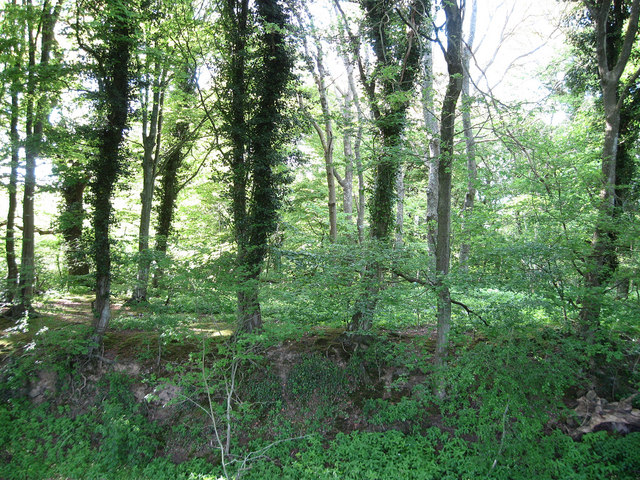
The location of the former Glottenham Castle.

Glottenham Castle was a castle in Mountfield, East Sussex, around 5 miles (8 km) north of Battle Abbey. Built in the 13th century, it was abandoned in the late 16th or 17th century.

== History ==
The Sussex manor of Glottenham has had boundary ditches since the 11th century, and the moat at Glottenham Castle is believed to date from around 1200. Glottenham Castle was built in the late 13th century. The castle had stone walls, two square towers and a gatehouse. The castle was owned by the de Etchingham family, before being abandoned in the late 16th or 17th century. In the 19th century, the land around Glottenham Castle was used for growing hops. In 1920, the castle's estate was sold at auction, and was listed as 595 acres (241 ha).

In 1990, the site was listed under the Ancient Monuments and Archaeological Areas Act 1979. The site is now a popular camping and glamping site.
