= Susan Williams, Baroness Williams of Trafford =

British politician and life peer (born 1967)

The Right Honourable The Baroness Williams of Trafford PC
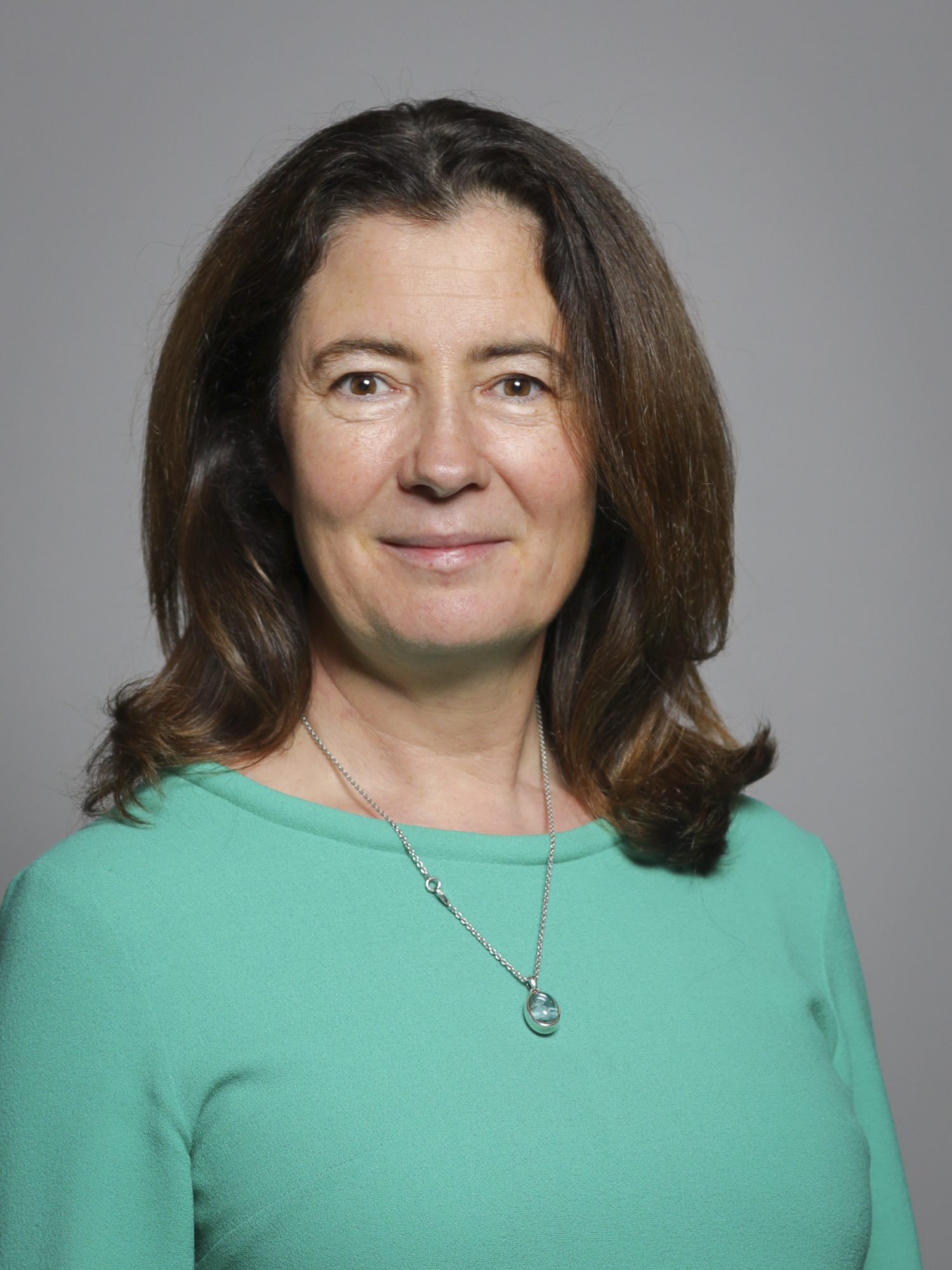
- Official portrait, 2019

Opposition Chief Whip in the House of Lords
- Incumbent
- Assumed office 8 July 2024
- Leader: Rishi Sunak; Kemi Badenoch
- Preceded by: The Lord Kennedy of Southwark

Chief Whip of the House of Lords Captain of the Honourable Corps of Gentlemen-at-Arms
- In office 7 September 2022 – 5 July 2024
- Prime Minister: Liz Truss; Rishi Sunak
- Preceded by: The Lord Ashton of Hyde
- Succeeded by: The Lord Kennedy of Southwark

Minister of State for Home Affairs
- In office 17 July 2016 – 7 September 2022
- Prime Minister: Theresa May; Boris Johnson
- Preceded by: The Lord Keen of Elie
- Succeeded by: The Lord Murray of Blidworth

Minister of State for Equalities
- In office 9 January 2018 – 13 February 2020
- Prime Minister: Theresa May; Boris Johnson
- Preceded by: Nick Gibb
- Succeeded by: Kemi Badenoch

Parliamentary Under-Secretary of State for the Northern Powerhouse
- In office 11 May 2015 – 17 July 2016
- Prime Minister: David Cameron
- Preceded by: The Lord Ahmad of Wimbledon
- Succeeded by: Andrew Percy

Baroness-in-waiting Government Whip
- In office 8 April 2014 – 11 May 2015
- Prime Minister: David Cameron
- Preceded by: The Earl Attlee
- Succeeded by: The Baroness Chisholm of Owlpen

Member of the House of Lords
- Lord Temporal
- Life peerage 20 September 2013

Leader of Trafford Council
- In office 7 May 2004 – 5 May 2011
- Preceded by: David Acton
- Succeeded by: Matt Colledge

Personal details
- Born: Susan Frances Maria McElroy; 16 May 1967 (age 59) Blackrock, Cork, Ireland
- Party: Conservative
- Education: Huddersfield Polytechnic

Susan Frances Maria Williams, Baroness Williams of Trafford PC (née McElroy; born 16 May 1967) is a Conservative life peer who was appointed the Chief Conservative Whip of the House of Lords in 2022. As government chief whip she was Captain of the Honourable Corps of Gentlemen-at-Arms until the electoral defeat of the Conservative Party in July 2024. In March 2022 she was made a member of the Privy Council. She continued to be chief whip in the House of Lords for the Conservative Party, now in opposition, in July 2024.

== Education ==
Williams was educated at La Sagesse School, a Roman Catholic private school in Newcastle upon Tyne, and Huddersfield Polytechnic, where she gained a BSc Hons in Applied Nutrition.

== Career ==
=== Early political career ===
She was a member of Trafford Metropolitan Borough Council from 1998 to 2011, representing Altrincham, and the council's leader from 2004 to 2009, leading a Conservative majority until she stepped down.

She has also been a member of various public bodies in the North West region. As a parliamentary candidate, she first stood unsuccessfully for the safe Labour Wythenshawe and Sale East constituency in 2001, and for the Bolton West constituency in the 2010 general election, losing by 92 votes.

=== House of Lords and ministerial career ===
On 20 September 2013 she was created a life peer as Baroness Williams of Trafford, of Hale in the county of Greater Manchester.

In April 2014, Williams succeeded Earl Attlee as baroness-in-waiting (government whip).

In 2015, David Cameron appointed Williams to his second government as a Parliamentary Under Secretary of State for Communities and Local Government. On 28 May 2015 she introduced the Cities and Local Government Devolution Bill 2015–16 to the House of Lords.

Williams was appointed Minister for Countering Extremism, the Home Office representative in the House of Lords in the First May ministry.

She was appointed Minister of State for Equalities in January 2018 by Theresa May.

In the 2020 British cabinet reshuffle, Williams was made Minister of State at the Home Office, and in March 2022 was made a member of the Privy Council, entitling her to the post-nominals PC for life.

Following the resignation of Boris Johnson, and the appointment of Liz Truss as Prime Minister of the United Kingdom, Williams was appointed as Chief Whip of the Conservative Party in the House of Lords and Captain of the Honourable Corps of Gentlemen-at-Arms. In that role, she took part in the Royal Procession at the Coronation of Charles III and Camilla.

Political offices
Preceded by The Lord Ahmad of Wimbledon	Parliamentary Under-Secretary of State for the Northern Powerhouse; 2015–2016	Succeeded by Andrew Percy
Preceded by Nick Gibb	Minister of State for Equalities; 2018–2020	Succeeded by Kemi Badenoch
Preceded by The Lord Keen of Elie	Minister of State for Countering Extremism; 2016–2019	Succeeded by Herself as Minister of State for Home Affairs
Preceded by Herself as Minister of State for Countering Extremism	Minister of State for Home Affairs; 2019–2022	Succeeded by The Lord Murray of Blidworth
Preceded by The Lord Ashton of Hyde	Chief Whip of the House of Lords; 2022–2024	Succeeded by The Lord Kennedy of Southwark
Preceded by The Lord Ashton of Hyde	Captain of the Honourable Corps of Gentlemen-at-Arms; 2022–2024	Succeeded by The Lord Kennedy of Southwark
Party political offices
Preceded by The Lord Ashton of Hyde	Conservative Chief Whip in the House of Lords; 2022–present	Incumbent
Orders of precedence in the United Kingdom
Preceded by The Baroness Kennedy of Cradley	Ladies; Baroness Williams of Trafford	Followed by The Baroness Jones of Moulsecoomb
