= Thomas de Ashton =

Thomas de Ashton may refer to:

- Thomas de Ashton (warrior) (fl. 1346), English warrior
- Thomas de Ashton (alchemist) (born 1403), English alchemist

== See also ==
- Thomas Ashton (disambiguation)
