= Mountfield, East Sussex =

Village in East Sussex, England

Coordinates: 50.96°N 0.48°E

Mountfield
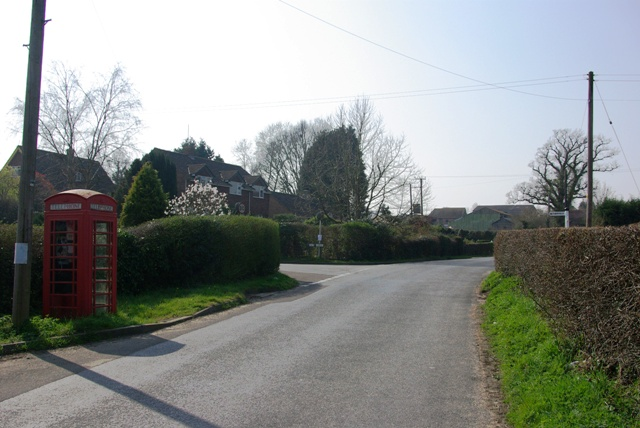
- The junction of Church Road and Hoath Hill, Mountfield

- Location within East Sussex
- Area: 15.3 km^{2} (5.9 sq mi)
- Population: 616 (Parish-2011)
  - Density: 97/sq mi (37/km^{2})
- OS grid reference: TQ742203
  - London: 46 miles (74 km) NW
- District: Rother
- Shire county: East Sussex
- Region: South East
- Country: England
- Sovereign state: United Kingdom
- Post town: ROBERTSBRIDGE
- Postcode district: TN32
- Dialling code: 01580
- Police: Sussex
- Fire: East Sussex
- Ambulance: South East Coast
- UK Parliament: Bexhill and Battle
- Website: The Parish of Mountfield website

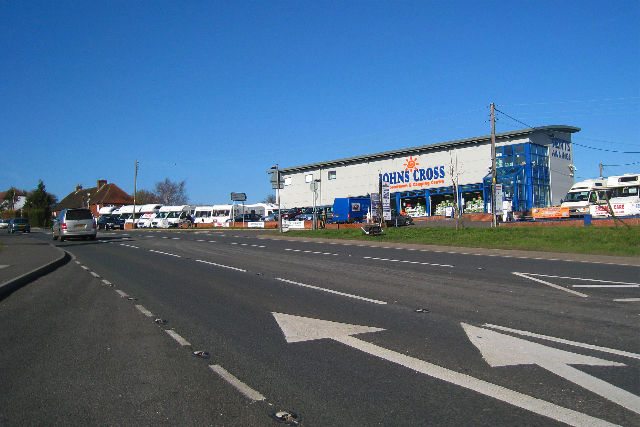
John's Cross. Near Mountfield.

Mountfield is a village and civil parish in the Rother district of East Sussex, England, and three miles (5 km) north-west of Battle. It is mentioned in the Domesday Book.

The parish church is dedicated to All Saints. Mountfield and Whatlington Church of England Primary School is at the road junction in the nearby hamlet of Johns Cross by the A21 and the A2100 roads further north. The parish includes the linear settlement of Vinehall Street, to the south from Johns Cross, which contains the independent Vinehall School.

== Governance ==
The lowest level of government is the Mountfield parish council. The parish council is responsible for local amenities including two playing fields and a children's play area. Elections are held every four years. The May 2011 election was uncontested.

Rother District council provides the next level of government with services such as refuse collection, planning consent, leisure amenities and council tax collection. Mountfield is part of the Darwell Ward.

East Sussex county council is the third tier of government, providing education, libraries and highway maintenance. Mountfield falls within the Battle and Crowhurst ward.

The UK Parliament constituency for Mountfield is Bexhill and Battle.

Prior to Brexit in 2020, the village was part of the South East England constituency in the European Parliament.

== Landmarks ==
There are two Sites of Special Scientific Interest within the parish. River Line is a section of river noted for its geological features as it cuts through many layers from the late Jurassic and early Cretaceous periods. Darwell Wood is a broadleaved woodland of biological interest. It has a number of streams flowing through it on the way to Darwell Reservoir.

Two miles north-west of the village are the overgrown vestigial remains of Glottenham Castle, a twelfth-century fortified manor house, surrounded by a moat now mostly dry.
