= John Assheton (disambiguation) =

John Assheton (fl. 1548) was an Anglican priest.

John Assheton may also refer to:

- John Assheton I (c. 1354–c. 1398), English military commander and MP for Lancashire
- Sir John Assheton II (died 1428), English soldier and MP for Lancashire, son of the above

== See also ==
- John Ashton (disambiguation)
