= Peter Vansittart =

English writer

Peter Vansittart OBE, FRSL (27 August 1920 – 4 October 2008) was an English writer. He had 50 novels published between 1942 and 2008; he also wrote historical studies, memoirs, stories for children and three anthologies: Voices from the Great War (his most popular book), Voices 1870–1914 and Voices of the Revolution. He received an OBE in 2008 for his services to literature.

== Biography ==
He was born in Bedford in 1920, the son of Edwin Morris and Mignon Vansittart. Peter Vansittart was educated at Marlborough House School, Haileybury College and Worcester College, Oxford, although he spent only a year at Oxford and did not graduate. He worked as a schoolteacher at progressive schools – most notably Burgess Hill School, Hampstead – for 25 years before becoming a full-time writer. He wrote a novel about his time as a schoolteacher called Broken Canes. For many years he made money by letting rooms in a house in Hampstead which he bought for £200 in cash from an acquaintance in a pub in the 1940s. This inspired his novel Landlord. After living in London for much of his life, Vansittart moved to Kersey, Suffolk to a house inherited from his mother until his death.

He died on 4 October 2008 at Ipswich Hospital aged 88.

== Writing career ==
Vansittart's novels span eras from 2000 BC to AD 1986. For several decades he was acclaimed as England's greatest living historical novelist. He said of his work, "My novels have been appreciated, if not always enjoyed, more by critics than the reading public, which shows no sign of enjoying them at all. This must be partly due to my obsession with language and speculation at the expense of narrative, however much I relish narrative in others".

In his works, Vansittart expressed his fascination with how time transforms historical facts into fantasy and myth. He said, "I was long impressed by the woeful distinction between the historical Macbeth and Shakespeare's: by the swift transformation of E.M. Forster's very English Mrs. Moore into an Indian goddess. Such phenomena relate very immediately to my own work, in which myth can be all too real, and the real degenerate into fantasy".

Secret Protocols, his last novel, is set in World War II and was published in 2007.

== Bibliography ==
Novels

- I Am the World. London, Chatto and Windus, 1942.
- Enemies. London, Chapman and Hall, 1947.
- The Overseer. London, Chapman and Hall, 1949.
- Broken Canes. London, Lane, 1950.
- A Verdict of Treason. London, Lane, 1952.
- A Little Madness. London, Lane, 1953.
- The Game and the Ground. London, Reinhardt, 1956; New York, Abelard Schuman, 1957.
- Orders of Chivalry. London, Bodley Head, 1958; New York, Abelard Schuman, 1959.
- The Tournament. London, Bodley Head, 1959; New York, Walker, 1961.
- A Sort of Forgetting. London, Bodley Head, 1960
- Carolina. London, New English Library, 1961.
- Sources of Unrest. London, Bodley Head, 1962.
- The Friends of God. London, Macmillan, 1963; as The Siege, New York, Walker, 1963.
- The Lost Lands. London, Macmillan, and New York, Walker, 1964.
- The Story Teller. London, Peter Owen, 1968.
- Pastimes of a Red Summer. London, Peter Owen, 1969.
- Landlord. London, Peter Owen, 1970.
- Quintet. London, Peter Owen, 1976.
- Lancelot. London, Peter Owen, 1978.
- The Death of Robin Hood. London, Peter Owen, 1981.
- Three Six Seven. London, Peter Owen, 1983.
- Harry Park Editions, 1985
- Aspects of Feeling. London, Peter Owen, 1986.
- Parsifal. London, Peter Owen, 1988; Chester Springs, Pennsylvania, Dufour, 1989.
- The Wall. London, Peter Owen, 1990.
- A Choice of Murder. London, Peter Owen, 1992.
- A Safe Conduct. London, Peter Owen, 1995; Chester Springs, Pennsylvania, 1995.
- Hermes in Paris London, Peter Owen, 2000
- Secret Protocols. 2007.

Other

- The Dark Tower: Tales from the Past (for children). London, Macdonald, 1965; New York, Crowell, 1969.
- The Shadow Land: More Stories from the Past (for children). London, Macdonald, 1967.
- Green Knights, Black Angels: The Mosaic of History (for children). London, Macmillan, 1969.
- Vladivostok (essay). London, Covent Garden Press, 1972.
- Dictators. London, Studio Vista, 1973.
- Worlds and Underworlds: Anglo-European History Through the Centuries. London, Peter Owen, 1974.
- Flakes of History. London, Park, 1978.
- The Ancient Mariner and the Old Sailor: Delights and Uses of Words. London, Centre for Policy Studies, 1985.
- Paths from a White Horse: A Writer's Memoir. London, Quartet, 1985.
- London: A Literary Companion. London, Murray, 1992.
- In the Fifties. London, Murray, 1995.
- In Memory of England: A Novelist's View of History. London, John Murray, 1998.
- Survival Tactics: A Literary Life. London and Chester Springs, Pennsylvania, Peter Owen, 1999.
- John Paul Jones, a rebellious spirit Robson 2003

As editor

- Voices from the Great War. London, Cape, 1981; New York, Watts, 1984.
- Voices: 1870–1914. London, Cape, 1984; New York, Watts, 1985.
- John Masefield's Letters from the Front 1915–1917. London, Constable, 1984; New York, Watts, 1985.
- Happy and Glorious! An Anthology of Royalty. London, Collins, 1988.
- Voices of the Revolution. London, Collins, 1989.
- Kipps, by H. G. Wells. London, Everyman, 1993.
- Poems by Alan Ross, Warwick, Greville Press, 2005.

 

== Awards ==
- Society of Authors travelling scholarship, 1969
- Arts Council bursary, 1981, 1984.
- Fellow, Royal Society of Literature, 1985.
- OBE for his services to literature, 2008
