= Vinehall Street =

Linear settlement in East Sussex, England

Coordinates: 50.9563°N 0.498204°E

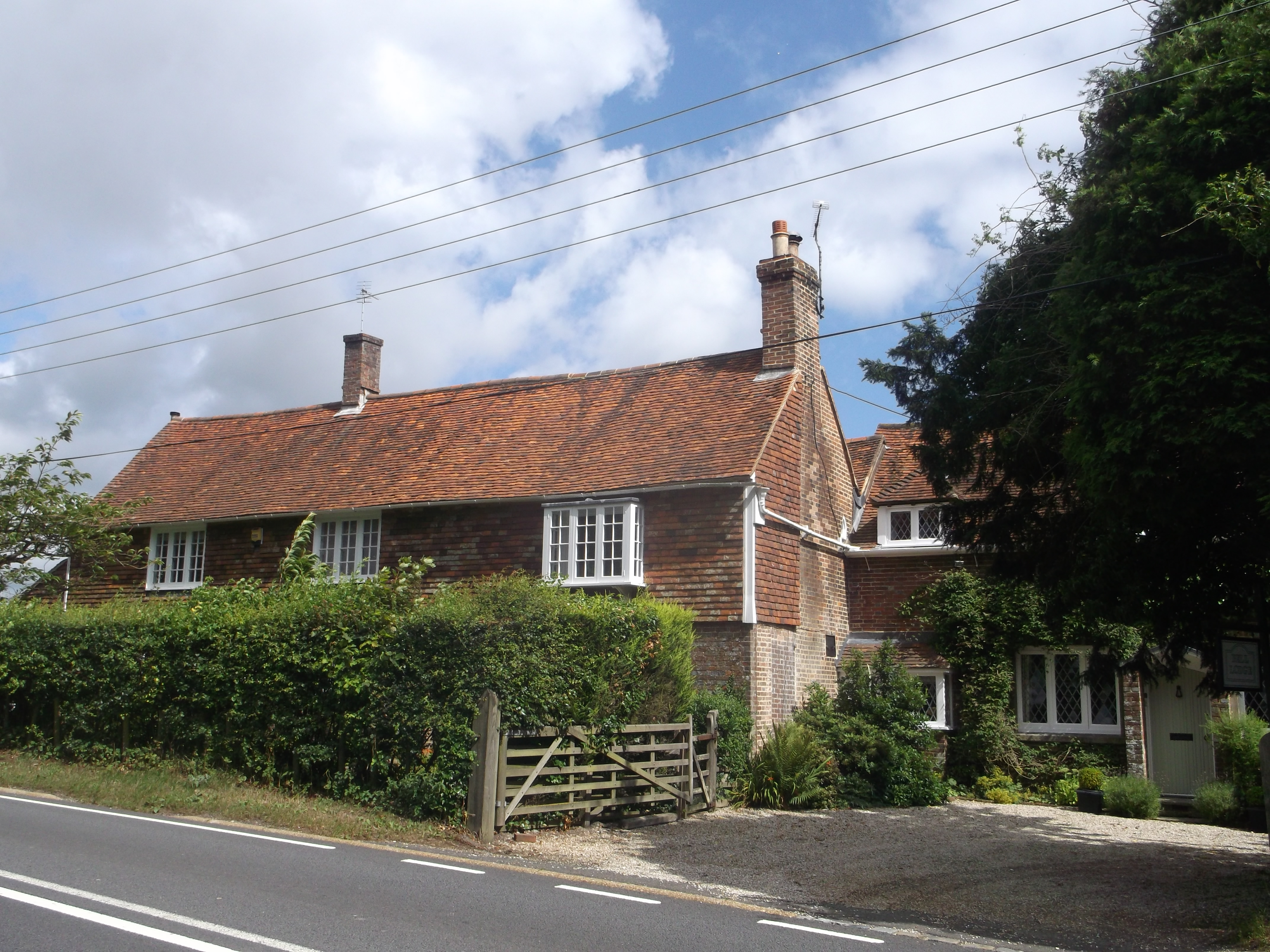
- Grade II listed Ball Cottage

- Location within East Sussex
- OS grid reference: TQ755204
  - London: 46 miles (74 km) NW
- District: Rother
- Shire county: East Sussex
- Region: South East
- Country: England
- Sovereign state: United Kingdom
- Post town: Tonbridge
- Postcode district: TN32
- Dialling code: 01580
- Police: Sussex
- Fire: East Sussex
- Ambulance: South East Coast
- UK Parliament: Bexhill and Battle

Vinehall Street (or Vinehall), is a linear settlement in the civil parishes of Mountfield and Whatlington, and the Rother district of East Sussex, England. Marlborough House Vinehall School (formerly Vinehall School) is situated in Vinehall Street.

== History ==
In 19th century Vinehall Street, the Vinehall School estate (TQ751205), was Rushton Park, in 1860 the home of William Rushton Adamson (1825 - 1898), JP, DL and lord of the manor, who was buried at All Saints Church in Mountfield. Rushton Park was described as a "handsome and well arranged mansion, situated on an eminence in extensive grounds, commanding beautiful views of the surrounding country: the pleasure grounds cover about 5 acres: the forcing garden consists of two ranges of houses [greenhouses], each 160 feet long: the house and stables are supplied with gas made on the premises." William Rushton Adamson was chairman of the Berne Land Company, and for The Thames and Mersey Marine Insurance Company, The North Metropolitan Railway and Canal Company, and the London and St Katherine Docks Company was a director. By 1902 the estate was owned by Lord Ashton of Hyde (1855–1933), JP and parish principal landowner. It was then named as Vinehall, the buildings extending over 18 acres (7.3 ha) in a "well wooded" estate of 400 acres (160 ha). The grounds were "believed" to have been designed by Joseph Paxton. The school was established in 1938.

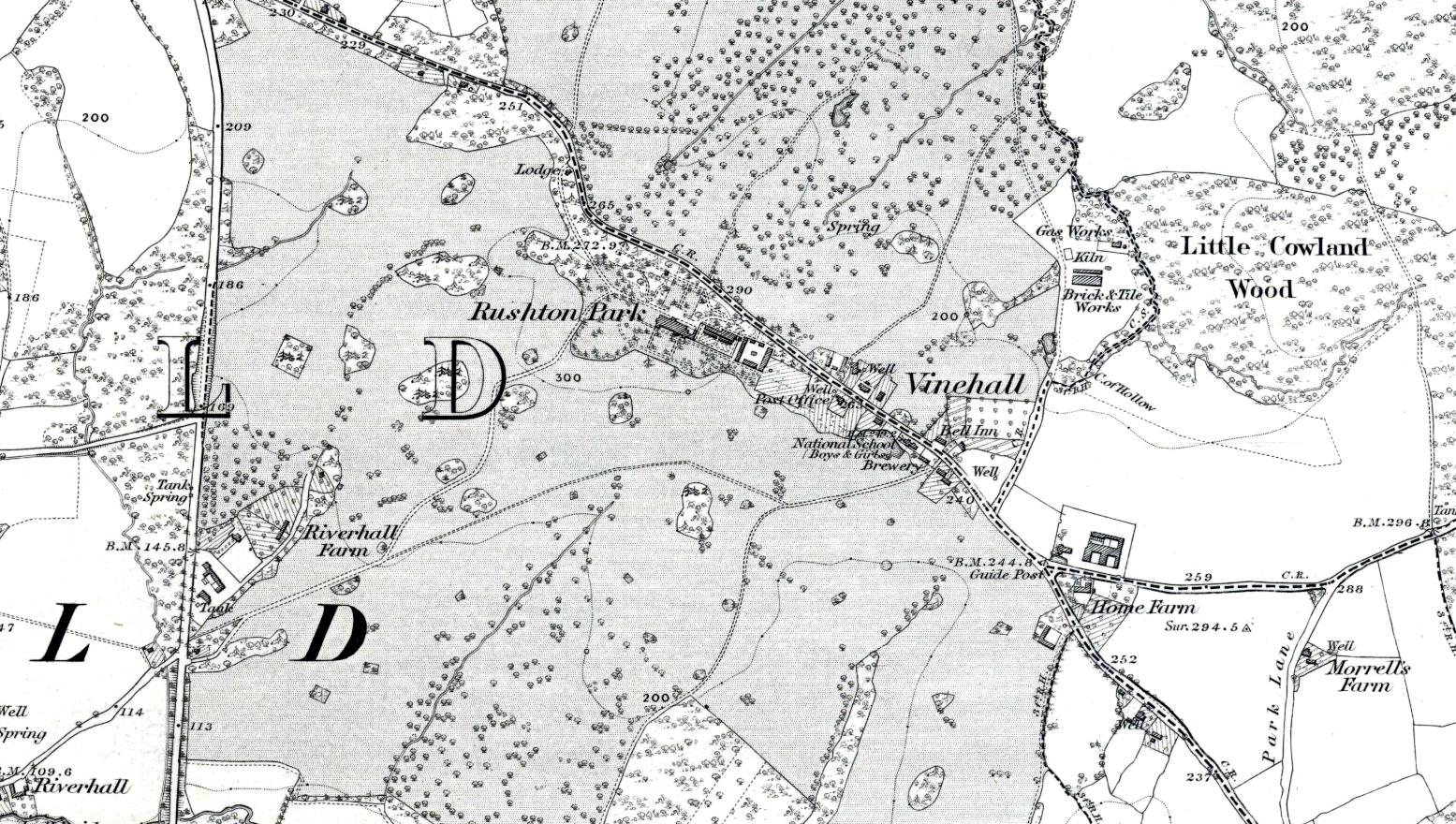
Vinehall Street (Vinehall), in 1878

Nineteenth century maps of Vinehall Street show the Bell Inn public house, a brewery, post office, a National School for boys and girls, two farms, a fish pond and a club. At the north in woodland were a gas works, and a brick & tile works, with kiln.

== Geography ==
Vinehall Street, 22 miles (35 km) miles east from the county town of Lewes, and on the A21 Vinehall Road, extends 1.2 miles (2 km) miles from the junction with the B2089 road to Cripps Corner and East Grinstead, north-west to John's Cross. The north-west part is in Mountfield, the south-east in Whatlington. Height above sea level averages 250 feet (76 m). The B2089 was formerly a turnpike road that ran north-east from Vinehall Street, through Cripps Corner to Staplecross.

== Community ==
At the north-west of Vinehall Street, on the A21, is Marlborough House Vinehall School, formerly Rushton Park, an independent co-educational day and boarding school for 2- to 13-year-olds, which is part of the Repton Family of Schools.

Businesses, chiefly at the south-east, includes a farm, and companies for livery and stabling, painting and decorating, and interior design. The 60-unit Vinehall Business Centre (TQ757202), includes units for bridal and wedding services, building services, joinery services, electrical services, an auto repair workshop, a farm supplier, a hairdresser, a garden machinery supplier, and an event and party decorator.

Six bus routes stop at Vinehall Street: Netherfield to Battle; Etchingham to Pebsham (Bexhill-on-Sea); Westfield to Robertsbridge, Peasmarsh to Robertsbridge; Hastings to Tunbridge Wells, and Mountfield to Baldslow. The closest railway station is at Bodiam, part of the heritage Kent and East Sussex Railway, 4 miles (6.4 km) to the north-east, linking to the town of Tenterden at the north-east. The closest National Rail station is at Robertsbridge on the Hastings line, 2 miles to the north, linking to Tunbridge Wells and Hastings.

== Landmarks ==
Barnes Wood is part of Vinehall Forest, at the north of Vinehall Street (TQ757208), and is a mixed plantation and broadleaf open woodland owned by the Forestry Commission.

Private housing, largely 20th century renovated, lies on the wooded margins of Vinehall Road.

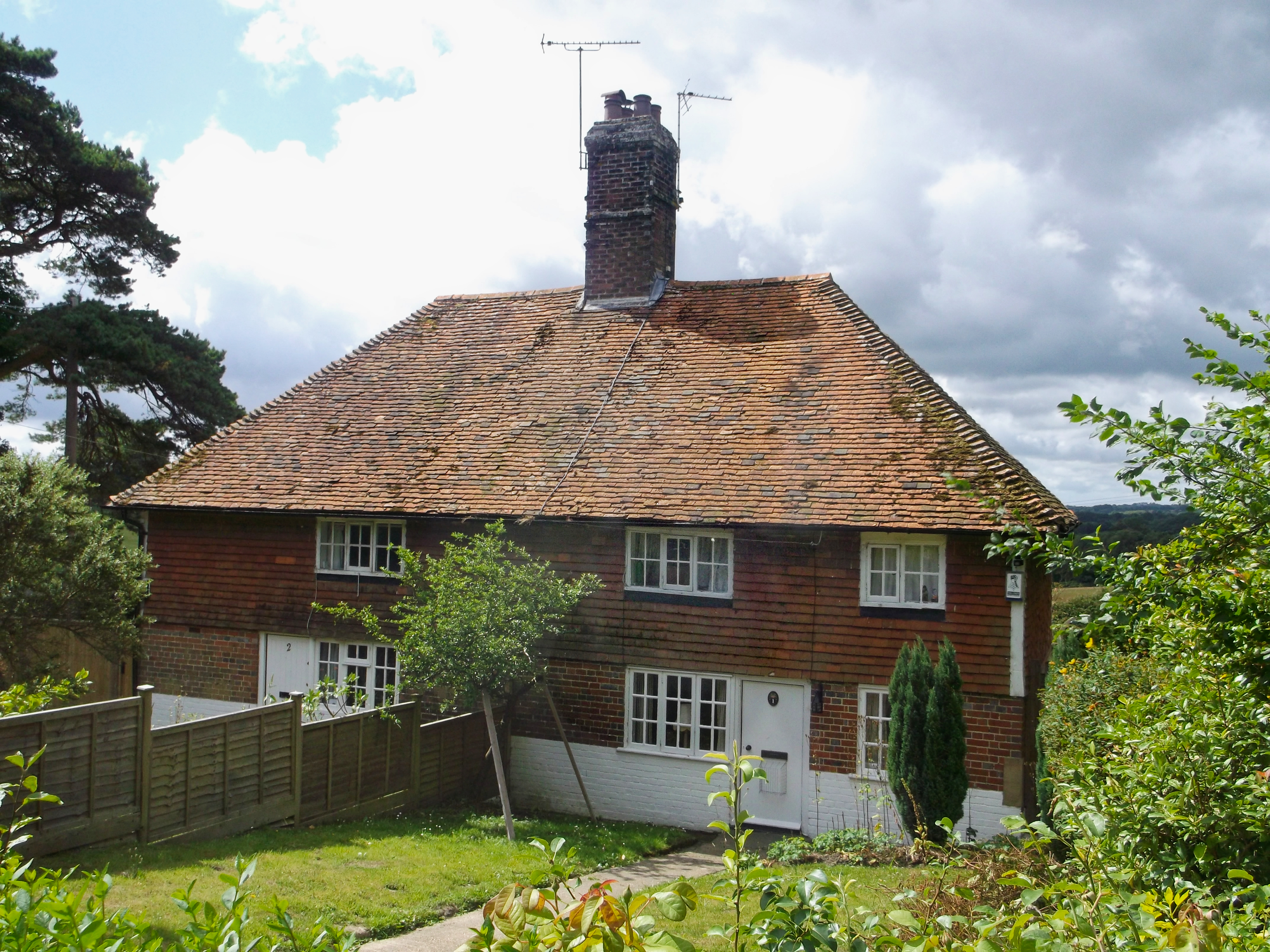
Listed Old World Cottages

There are four Grade II listed cottages at Vinehall Street in Mountfield. Carpenters Cottage (TQ7543020498), opposite the grounds of Vinehall School is a two-storey, 18th-century, L-shaped house converted from two cottages. Casement windows are set into a red brick ground, and a tile faced first floor. At 170 yards (155 m) east from Carpenters Cottage, on the same north side of the road, is the conjoined Bell Cottage and Bell Lodge (TQ7543020498), the former Bell Inn, dating to the 18th-century, of two storeys, and like Carpenters Cottage, with casement windows set into a red brick ground, and a tile faced first floor. The recessed eastern part was originally stabling for the inn. Adjacent at 20 yards (18 m) to the east from Bell Cottage, is Midsummer Cottage. It was formerly known as Yew Tree Cottage, dating to at least the 17th century. Of two storeys, and originally two cottages, its build structure is as Bell and Carpenters cottages. Of similar construction and style is Old World Cottages opposite Midsummer Cottage (TQ7555820353), one building semi-detached, dating to at least the 18th century.

At the south-east of Vinehall Street, within Whatlington, are three Grade II listed buildings. At the junction of the A21 with the B2089 is Vinehall Manor (TQ7555820353), an L-shaped 16th-century house of two storeys, an attic with gabled dormer window, a tiled roof, and an external chimney breast at the west wall. The red brick ground, and a tile faced first floor, contains casement windows with "pointed Gothic panes". The house was the home of the Dunk family. At 300 yards (274 m) east from Vinehall Manor, on the B2090 Park Lane, is Morrells (TQ7605120131), a "small" house of two storeys with casement windows set into a red brick ground, and a tile faced first floor, and a "steeply pitched tiled roof", which dates at least to the 17th century. At 3,230 yards (2,953.5 m) south from Vinehall Manor, and on the A21, is Rosewell Testers (TQ7584620023), street-signed as 'Rosewell Cottage', is a house, today semi-detached, dating at least to the 17th century. The red brick ground, and a tile faced slightly overhanging first floor, contains casement windows with "pointed Gothic panes", and overlays the earlier timber framed structure. The hipped roof is of a steep pitch.
