= Thomas de Ashton (warrior) =

English warrior (fl. 1346)

Ashton arms: Argent, a mullet sable pierced of the field

Thomas de Ashton (fl. 1346), was an English warrior.

Ashton was the son and heir of Sir Robert de Ashton, and though the chief recorded event of his life shows him to have been a man of conspicuous military courage, he does not appear to have received the honour of knighthood, or to have been employed in any of the offices in which his father had distinguished himself.

Whilst Edward III was fighting in France, David II of Scotland, entered Northumberland with a force estimated at 50,000 men, and wasted and pillaged the country as far as Durham. Queen Philippa, the heroic wife of Edward III, marched against the invaders with a force of about 12,000, whom she encouraged to the unequal conflict.

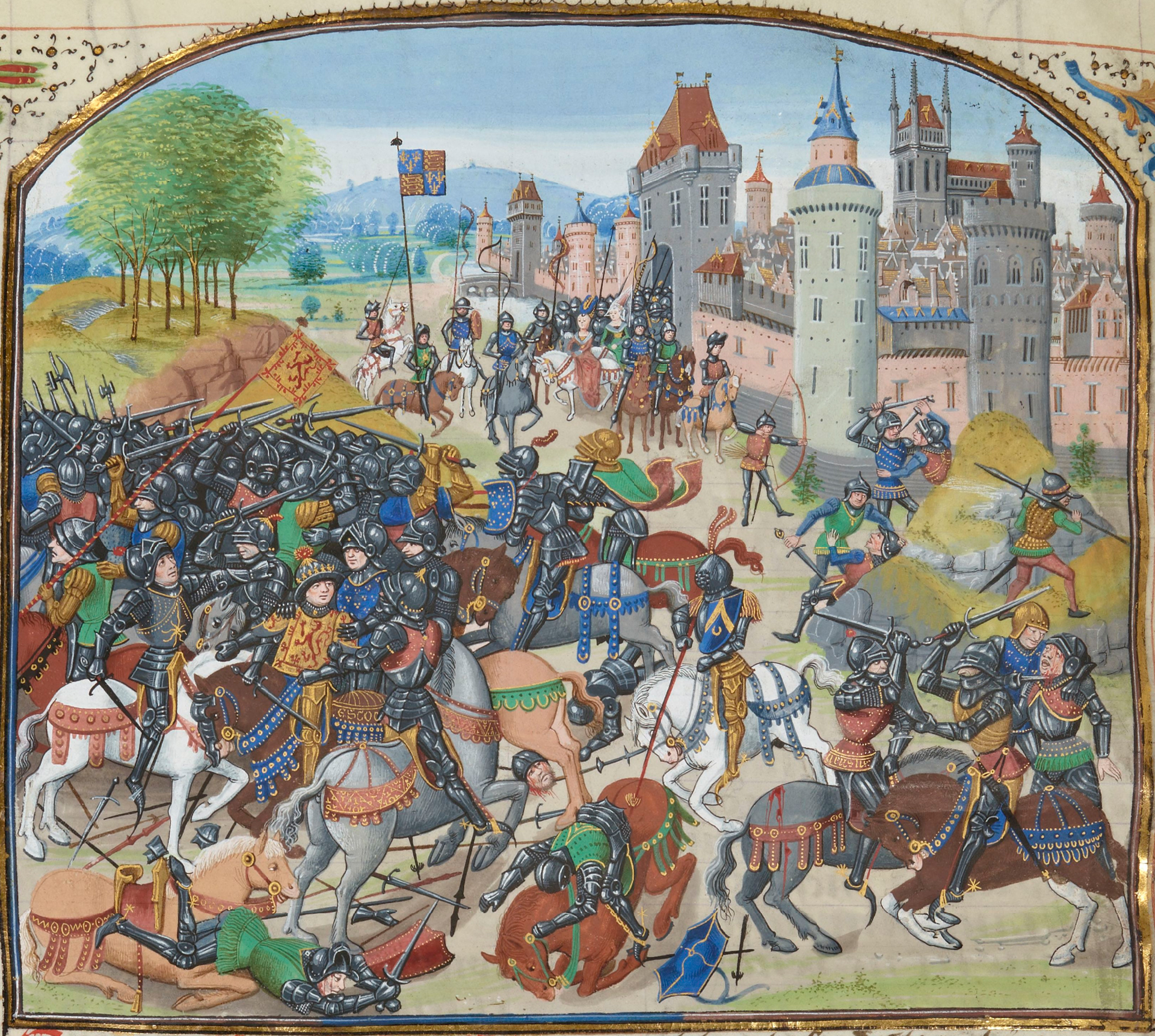
The Battle of Neville's Cross

Battle was joined at Neville's Cross, near Durham, 17 Oct. 1346, and the result was a decisive victory for the English. Thomas de Ashton, who fought under Lord Neville, captured the royal standard of Scotland.

Shortly after King David was made prisoner by John de Coupland, variously described as a Lancashire esquire and as a Northumberland gentleman, who was knighted when the king returned from France, but Ashton was still an esquire when, in 1385, he formed one of the retinue of John of Gaunt in his expedition to Spain.

He married Eleanor Buckley, daughter of Sir John Buckley of Buckley Hall, and had a Son, Sir John de Ashton, Knight. William de Ashton, doctor of laws, who was also with 'the serene prince, Lord John, king of Castile and León,' was his uncle.
