= Minister of State for the Home Office (United Kingdom) =

British government minister

- Royal Arms of His Majesty's Government

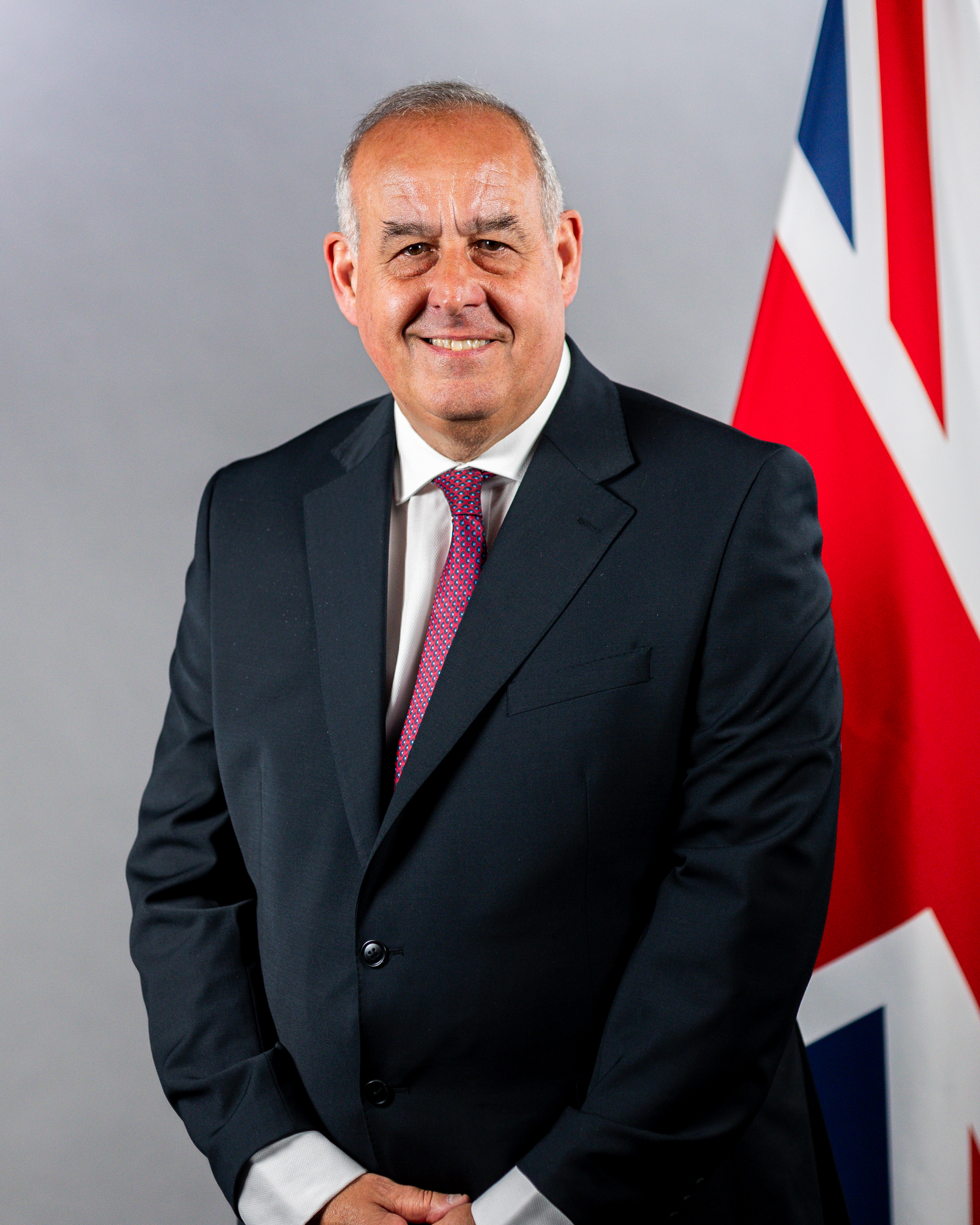
- Incumbent; David Hanson, Baron Hanson of Flint since 9 July 2024
- Home Office
- Style: Minister
- Nominator: Prime Minister of the United Kingdom
- Appointer: The Monarch; on advice of the Prime Minister
- Term length: At His Majesty's pleasure
- Website: www.GOV.uk/home-office

The Minister of State for the Home Office, previously the Minister of State for Home Affairs, is a mid-level position in the Home Office in the British government. The office has been held by David Hanson, Baron Hanson of Flint since the 9 July 2024.

== Responsibilities ==
The current Minister has following responsibilities:

- fraud
- departmental finance
- contract management (including asylum accommodation contracts)
- public safety, national security and migration and borders business in the Lords
- corporate and delivery
- overseas territories
- digital and technology
- data and identity
- analysis, science and research
- public appointments and sponsorship
- inquiries
- the Union and devolution
- Home Office interests in free trade agreements

== List of ministers ==
Name	Portrait	Entered office	Left office	Political party	Notes
Dennis Vosper		28 October 1960	27 June 1961	Conservative	Minister of State for Home Affairs
David Renton		27 June 1961	17 July 1962	Conservative	Minister of State for Home Affairs
George Jellicoe, 2nd Earl Jellicoe		17 July 1962	21 October 1963	Conservative	Minister of State for Home Affairs
Patrick Vanden-Bempde-Johnstone, 4th Baron Derwent		23 October 1963	16 October 1964	Conservative	Minister of State for Home Affairs
Alice Bacon		16 October 1964	29 August 1967	Labour	Minister of State for Home Affairs
Victor Collins, Baron Stonham		29 August 1967	13 October 1969	Labour	Minister of State for Home Affairs
Shirley Williams		13 October 1969	23 June 1970	Labour	Minister of State for Home Affairs
Richard Sharples		23 June 1970	7 April 1972	Conservative	Minister of State for Home Affairs
David Hennessy, 3rd Baron Windlesham		23 June 1970	26 March 1972	Conservative	Minister of State for Home Affairs
Mark Carlisle		7 April 1972	4 March 1974	Conservative	Minister of State for Home Affairs
Mark Colville, 4th Viscount Colville of Culross		21 April 1972	4 March 1974	Conservative	Minister of State for Home Affairs
Alex Lyon		8 March 1974	14 April 1976	Labour	Minister of State for Home Affairs
John Harris, Baron Harris of Greenwich		8 March 1974	3 January 1979	Labour	Minister of State for Home Affairs
Brynmor John		14 April 1976	4 May 1979	Labour	Minister of State for Home Affairs
Terence Boston, Baron Boston of Faversham		3 January 1979	4 May 1979	Labour	Minister of State for Home Affairs
Leon Brittan		4 May 1979	5 January 1981	Conservative	Minister of State for Home Affairs
Patrick Mayhew		5 January 1981	13 June 1983	Conservative	Minister of State for Home Affairs
Rodney Elton, 2nd Baron Elton		11 September 1984	25 March 1985	Conservative	Minister of State for Home Affairs
Giles Shaw		11 September 1984	10 September 1986	Conservative	Minister of State for Home Affairs
David Mellor		10 September 1986	13 June 1987	Conservative	Minister of State for Home Affairs
John Patten		13 June 1987	10 April 1992	Conservative	Minister of State for Home Affairs
Malcolm Sinclair, 20th Earl of Caithness		10 September 1986	10 January 1988	Conservative	Minister of State for Home Affairs
Robert Shirley, 13th Earl Ferrers		10 January 1988	20 July 1994	Conservative	Minister of State for Home Affairs
David Mellor		27 October 1989	22 June 1990	Conservative	Minister of State for Home Affairs
Angela Rumbold		23 July 1990	14 April 1992	Conservative	Minister of State for Home Affairs
Michael Jack		14 April 1992	27 May 1993	Conservative	Minister of State for Home Affairs
Michael Forsyth		20 July 1994	5 June 1995	Conservative	Minister of State for Home Affairs
David Maclean		27 May 1993	2 May 1997	Conservative	Minister of State for Home Affairs
Alun Michael		2 May 1997	27 October 1998	Labour	Minister of State for Home Affairs and Deputy Home Secretary
Paul Boateng		27 October 1998	11 June 2001	Labour	Minister of State for Home Affairs and Deputy Home Secretary
office not in use		11 June 2001	29 May 2002		
Charlie Falconer, Baron Falconer of Thoroton		29 May 2002	12 June 2003	Labour	Minister of State for Criminal Justice System
Patricia Scotland, Baroness Scotland of Asthal		12 June 2003	28 June 2007	Labour	Minister of State for Criminal Justice and Offender Management
Vernon Coaker		2 July 2007	5 October 2008	Labour	Parliamentary Under-Secretary of State for Crime Reduction
Alan Campbell		5 October 2008	11 May 2010	Labour	Parliamentary Under-Secretary of State for Crime Reduction
James Brokenshire		11 May 2010	11 May 2011	Labour	Parliamentary Under-Secretary of State for Crime Reduction
Angela Browning, Baroness Browning		1 May 2011	16 September 2011	Conservative	Minister of State for Crime Prevention and Antisocial Behaviour Reduction
Oliver Eden, 8th Baron Henley		16 September 2011	4 September 2012	Conservative	Minister of State for Crime Prevention and Antisocial Behaviour Reduction
Jeremy Browne		4 September 2012	7 October 2013	Liberal Democrats	Minister of State for Crime Prevention
Norman Baker		7 October 2013	3 November 2014	Liberal Democrats	Minister of State for Crime Prevention
Lynne Featherstone		4 November 2014	8 May 2015	Liberal Democrats	Minister of State for Crime Prevention
Michael Bates, Baron Bates		14 May 2015	31 March 2016	Conservative	Minister of State for Home Affairs
Richard Keen, Baron Keen of Elie; Advocate General for Scotland		1 April 2016	17 July 2016	Conservative	Government Spokesperson for the Home Office
Susan Williams, Baroness Williams of Trafford		17 July 2016	7 September 2022	Conservative	Minister of State for Home Affairs
Andrew Sharpe, Baron Sharpe of Epsom		20 September 2022	5 July 2024	Conservative	Parliamentary Under-Secretary of State for the Home Office
David Hanson, Baron Hanson of Flint		9 July 2024	incumbent	Labour	Minister of State for the Home Office
