= John Rowland Ashton =

English educationist based in Sweden (1917–2008)

John R. Ashton
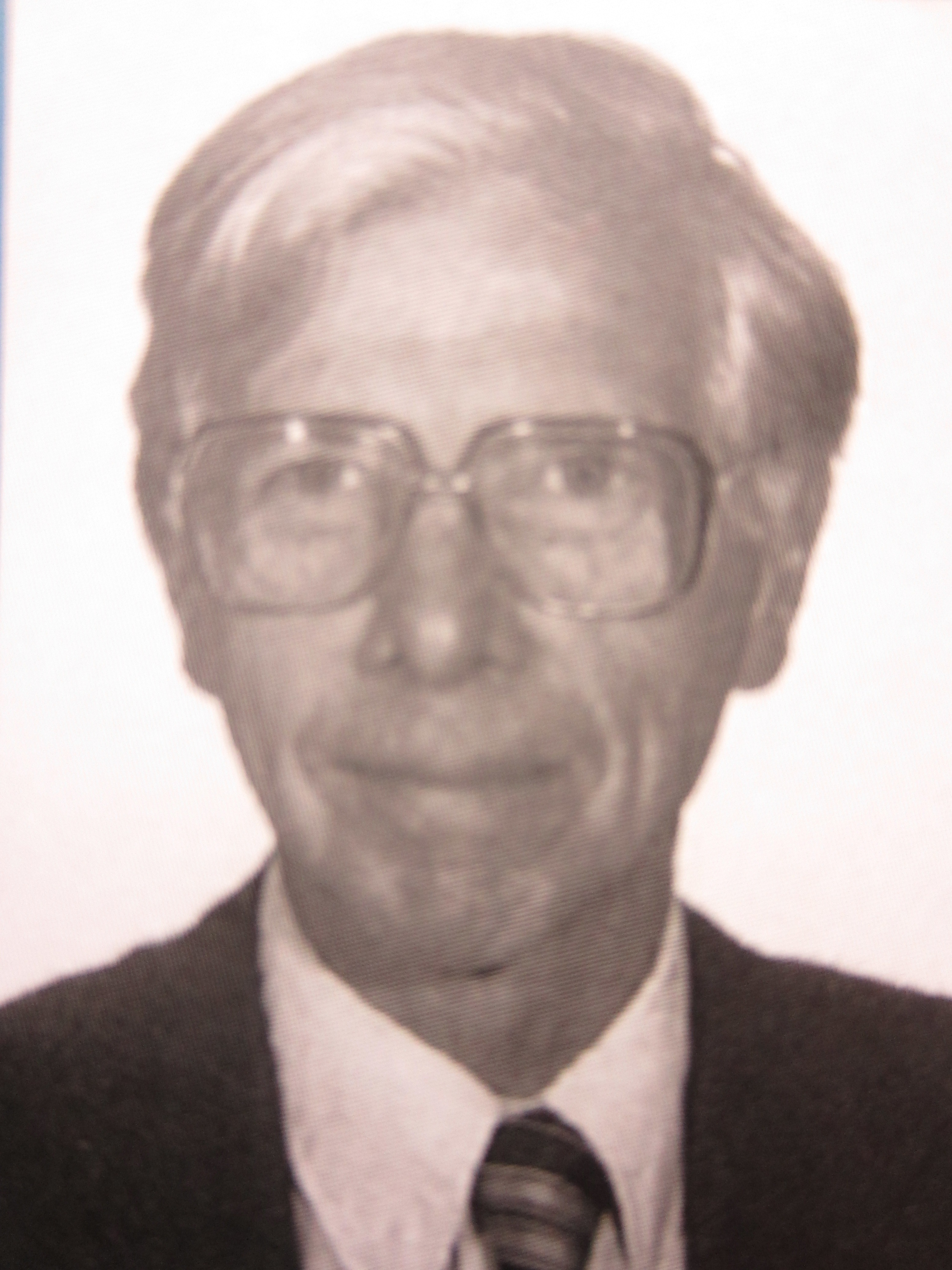
- John R. Ashton
- Born: 1917; Manchester, England
- Died: 2008 (aged 90–91); Gothenburg, Sweden

Academic work
- Main interests: Writer, lecturer, local historian and educationist

John R. Ashton MBE (1917–2008) was an English writer, lecturer, local historian and educationist active in Sweden. He was the former chairman of the British Factory. He resided in Gothenburg, Sweden, with his Swedish wife Torborg.

== Biography ==
John Rowland Ashton was born in Manchester, England, in 1917.

In his early life he studied law in London. He was employed by the Gothenburg Education Authority as English language teaching consultant in 1952, a post he held until 1982. During this time he co-authored several English language teaching series, published in Sweden and Norway. He also edited English texts for older students in Sweden, Germany and Holland. In 1957 he pioneered an English language teaching series on local television which he wrote and presented. He has also been active in the social life of the British community in Gothenburg being the vice-chairman of the English school (1960–1979) and a member of the English Church (St. Andrew's) Council (1974–1998). He was elected a member of the ancient British Factory in 1980 and soon became chairman. He was appointed MBE in the 1979 New Year Honours "For services to the teaching of English in Sweden".

John Ashton died in Gothenburg in 2008.

== Bibliography ==
=== English language teaching series ===
- 1957 Out and About – A three-year course for pupils aged 13–16. Published in Sweden
- 1962 Hands Up!, a three-year course for beginners. Published in Sweden and Norway.
- 1975 Contact – a three-year course for pupils aged 13–16. Published in Norway.

=== History ===
- 1997 A Short History of the English Church in Gothenburg (1749–1997)
- 2003 Lives and Livelihoods in Little London; The Story of the British in Gothenburg (1621–2001), Warne förlag, 2003, ISBN 978-91-86425-48-7

In 2003 he wrote Lives and Livelihoods in Little London; The Story of the British in Gothenburg (1621–2001). The book tells the fascinating story of why the Scots and English settled in Gothenburg and how a number of Scottish and English merchant families have contributed to the economic and cultural development of the city. Trade across the North Sea, especially in iron-bars and timber, has for nearly three hundred years been of vast importance in the growth of the port of Gothenburg.

The influence of this trade on the commercial and social life of Gothenburg is reflected in that the city is sometimes called Little London.
The story of the lives and livelihoods of members of the Barclays, David Carnegie, Chalmers, Sir William Chambers, Chapman, James Dickson, John Hall, Gibson and Keiller families – to name but a few – is told against a backdrop of major historical events in Europe. And that the influence of these families was positive and strong is indicated by the naming of streets in the city after them.

In the 17th century, the supplying of hemp, tar, masts, deals and iron to the Royal Navy was a profitable trade for the Scottish merchants in the port of Gothenburg. In 1731, the Swedish East India Company was founded and owed its initial success to the experience in the China trade of Colin Campbell. Events overseas involved Gothenburg in Jacobite politics and in the Napoleonic Wars. The Scottish and English influence in the city was strong and beneficial in the 19th century.
