= Catherine Chisholm =

British physician

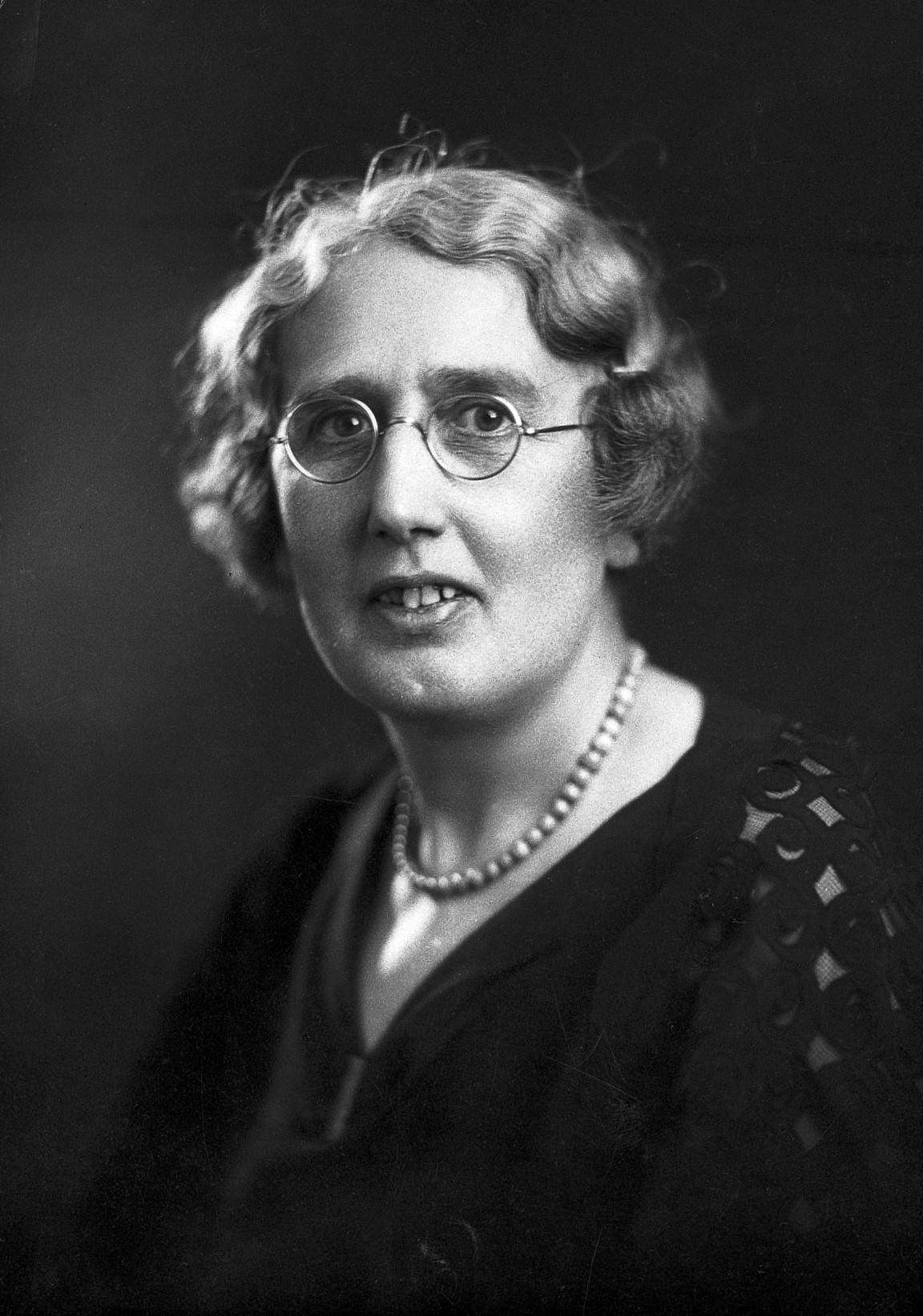
- Dr Catherine Chisholm C.B.E
- Born: 2 January 1878; Radcliffe, Lancashire, UK
- Died: 21 July 1952 (aged 74); Withington, Manchester, UK
- Education: Victoria University of Manchester
- Awards: C.B.E 1935, Honorary Fellow of the Royal College of Physicians 1949
- Scientific career
- Fields: Paediatrics, Obstetrics
- Institutions: Clapham Maternity Hospital, Eldwick Children's Santorium, Manchester Northern Hospital, Salford Hope Hospital, Manchester High School for Girls
- Thesis: Menstrual molimina (1912)

Catherine Chisholm CBE (2 January 1878 – 21 July 1952) was a British physician and the first female medical graduate of the University of Manchester. She was instrumental in founding the Manchester Babies Hospital, which was opened on 4 August 1914, contributing to her reputation as one of the founders of modern neonatology practice. She was appointed a CBE in 1935 and became the first female Honorary Fellow of the Royal College of Physicians in 1949.

== Early life ==
Chisholm was born in Radcliffe, Lancashire, a small town near Manchester. She was the eldest daughter of Kenneth Mackenzie Chisholm, himself a graduate of medicine from the University of Edinburgh, and general practitioner in the area. He was supportive of the idea that women should practice medicine at a time when few women were admitted to university to study medicine; and he encouraged Catherine by taking her on his rounds as a GP.

== Education ==
Chisholm entered Owens College, Manchester, in 1895, graduating with a BA in Classics in 1898. She was also awarded the Bishop Lee Greek Testament Prize. She entered the then Owens College Medical School in the university the following year as the first female student to do so – eventually graduating in medicine (MB ChB) from the Victoria University of Manchester, with a first-class degree in forensic medicine, obstetrics, surgery, and pathology.

== Career ==
Following graduation her first year of residency was as a medical officer at Clapham Maternity Hospital, one of the few hospitals in the county that employed only women doctors. She then undertook a further six-month placement at Eldwick Children's Sanatorium in Bingley, Yorkshire.

In 1906 she returned to Manchester to set up General Practice, serving female students at the university and in the local area. In 1908 she became Honorary Physician for children at the Northern Hospital in Manchester, a post she held to 1919 and overlapping with her roles as consultant for Hope Hospital in Salford (1914–36), and consultant to the Babies' Hospital (1914–50).

Her work to establish and then act as consultant to the Manchester Babies Hospital in many ways defined the rest of her career. The hospital was initially created as a small facility with just 12 beds, aimed at providing specialist care for the "more effective treatment of babies and very young children suffering from diarrhea and other gastrointestinal disorders". It was based on the model of the London Infants Hospital, but, like the Clapham Maternity Hospital, all the doctors were female.

Chisholm travelled to visit the Boston Children's Hospital in 1920, which informed her understanding of rickets in child health and led to the further addition of a special ward for rickets, a human breast milk bank, laboratory, and teaching facilities at the hospital. In 1935 the hospital was renamed the Duchess of York Hospital for Babies to coincide with the opening of a new surgical block by the Duchess of York.

Concurrent to her clinical work she held an academic lectureship at the University of Manchester for over 20 years (1923–1949) on vaccination and the diseases of children.

She was made the first female Honorary Fellow of the Royal College of Physicians in 1949, under a by-law that allowed election of "persons holding a medical qualification, but not Members of the College, who have distinguished themselves in the practice of medicine, or in the pursuit of Medical or General Science or Literature".

== Commitment to women's issues ==
Following her first graduate placement at a hospital with only women doctors, Chisholm demonstrated throughout her career a commitment to the promotion of better understanding and support of women's health.

She was essentially responsible for the founding of the Women Students' and Athletics' Union in 1899 at the University of Manchester, and was later to write in her book, The Medical Inspection of Girls in Secondary Schools, about the importance of sports and gymnastics for women. Her doctoral thesis focused on promoting healthy attitudes to menstruation, arguing in an era in which such subjects were little-discussed that a sound understanding of their bodies was essential for young women.

She was the school medical officer for the Manchester Girls' High School from 1908 to 1945, and the university medical officer for women students from 1918 to 1947; and her general practice established in 1906–1908 focused on serving women students of the university and in the surrounding local area.

As her clinical practice became increasingly linked to the developing child health movement she worked alongside key members of the feminist reform movement at the time in the Women's Citizens' Association. Following her appointment as a medical adviser on child health to the public health committee she worked especially with Margaret Ashton. As the committee's chairman, Manchester's first woman city councillor and a wealthy feminist in her own right, she provided financial support to establish the founding of the Babies Hospital in addition to funds from the city.

The Babies' Hospital was in its time one of the country's main women-run hospitals, and Chisholm herself trained over 150 medical women there. She was also key in the foundation of the Medical Women's Federation in 1917, aimed at countering discrimination and protecting women's interests as medical professionals. As its President (1928–30) she greatly expanded its membership and influence within the British Medical Association (BMA) and the Ministry of Health.

== Legacy ==
As a result of Chisholm's consistent lobbying for the role, the position of chair in Child Health was founded at the University of Manchester in 1947, and continues to the present day. She was also able to persuade the dean of the university of Manchester Medical School to establish Wilfred Gaisford as the first professor of paediatrics.

Following her death the Catherine Chisholm Memorial Lecture was endowed by subscription following an appeal in the British Medical Journal that "some tribute should be paid to her memory and that her many activities in various fields for the welfare and health of children should be commemorated". The trust continues to exist and is administered and presented by the Manchester Medical Society.

Her obituary in The Lancet in 1952 noted: "Many medical women – and men too – owe their advancement to her, for she opened the way and enabled them to move forward with confidence."
