= John de Ashton =

John de Ashton may refer to:

- John de Ashton (seneschal) (died 1428), seneschal of Bayeux
- John de Ashton (military commander) (c. 1354–c. 1398)

== See also ==
- John Ashton (disambiguation)
