= Henry Ashton, 4th Baron Ashton of Hyde =

British politician (born 1958)

The Right Honourable The Lord Ashton of Hyde PC
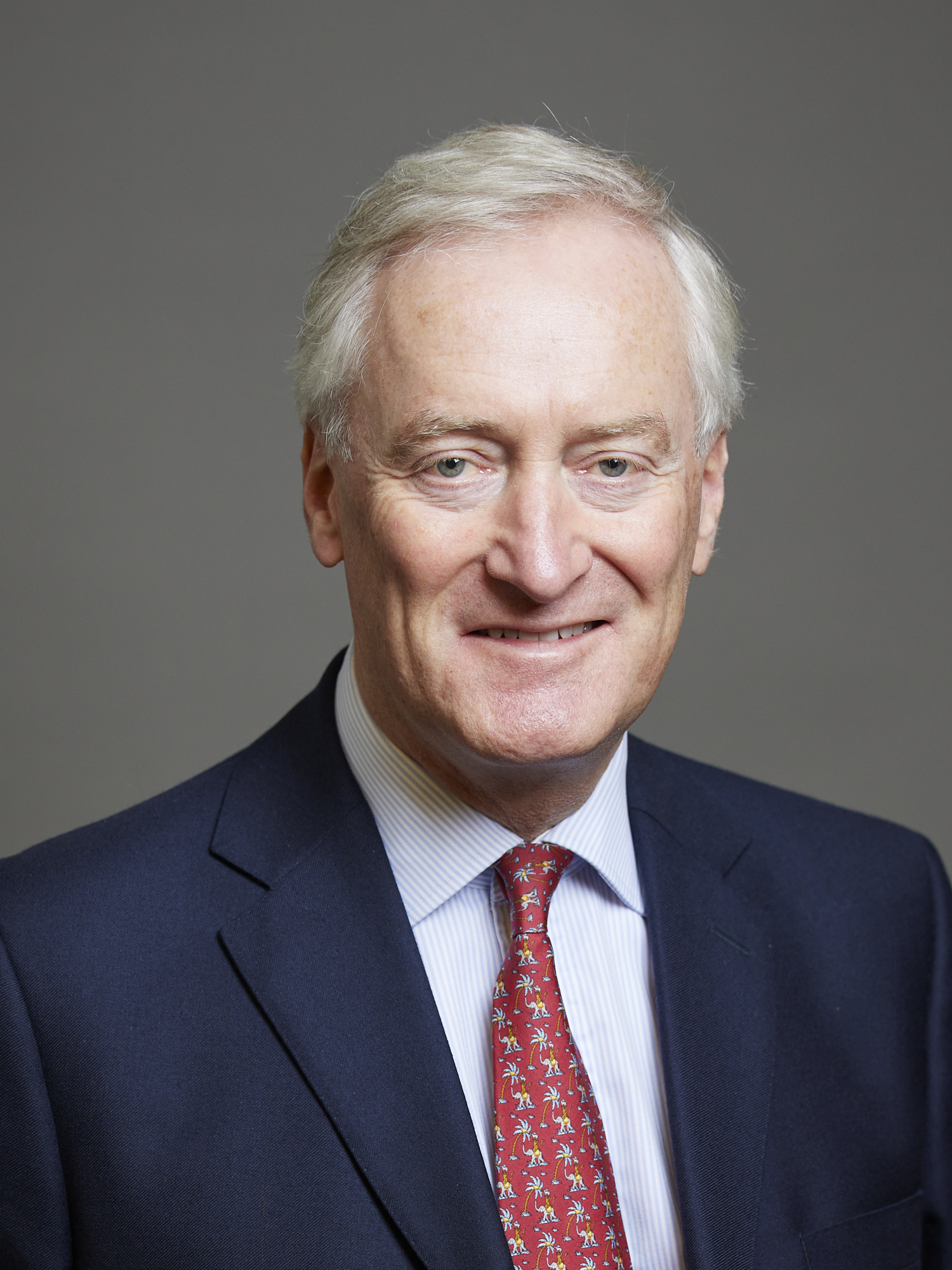
- Official portrait, 2022

Master of the Horse
- Incumbent
- Assumed office 18 June 2024
- Monarch: Charles III
- Preceded by: The Lord de Mauley

Chair of the International Relations and Defence Committee
- In office 31 January 2023 – 30 May 2024
- Preceded by: The Baroness Anelay of St Johns
- Succeeded by: The Lord de Mauley

Chief Whip of the House of Lords Captain of the Honourable Corps of Gentlemen-at-Arms
- In office 26 July 2019 – 7 September 2022
- Prime Minister: Boris Johnson
- Preceded by: The Lord Taylor of Holbeach
- Succeeded by: The Baroness Williams of Trafford

Parliamentary Under-Secretary of State for Civil Society
- In office 13 July 2016 – 26 July 2019
- Prime Minister: Theresa May
- Preceded by: Robert Wilson
- Succeeded by: The Baroness Barran

Lord-in-waiting Government Whip
- In office 15 July 2014 – 11 June 2017
- Prime Minister: David Cameron; Theresa May
- Preceded by: The Lord Bates
- Succeeded by: The Lord Henley

Member of the House of Lords
- Lord Temporal
- Elected Hereditary Peer; 25 July 2011 – 29 April 2026
- By-election: 2011
- Preceded by: The 7th Earl of Onslow
- Succeeded by: Seat abolished

Personal details
- Born: 18 July 1958 (age 68)
- Party: Conservative
- Spouse: Emma Allinson
- Relatives: Thomas Ashton (father)
- Education: Trinity College, Oxford (BA)

Thomas Henry Ashton, 4th Baron Ashton of Hyde PC (born 18 July 1958), is a British hereditary peer and former insurance broker who served as Chief Conservative Whip in the House of Lords and as Captain of the Honourable Corps of Gentlemen-at-Arms from 2019 to 2022.

He serves as Master of the Horse to King Charles III.

== Education and career ==
Henry Ashton went to Eton College and Trinity College, Oxford. He was commissioned in the Royal Hussars, later becoming a Lieutenant in the Royal Wessex Yeomanry. Ashton worked as an insurance broker and held the position of chief executive officer at Berkshire Hathaway-owned Lloyd's firms Faraday Underwriting Ltd, and Faraday Reinsurance Co. Ltd, from 2005 until 2013. From 2010 to 2013 Lord Ashton was a member of the Council of Lloyd's.

Elected a representative hereditary peer in July 2011, Ashton began to sit in the House of Lords as a Conservative. In the July 2014 government reshuffle he was appointed a Lord-in-waiting and Whip in the Lords by Prime Minister David Cameron, serving until the 2017 general election. In July 2016, Prime Minister Theresa May appointed him as Parliamentary Under-Secretary of State for the Department for Culture, Media & Sport.

In March 2019, Lord Ashton received international publicity and acclaim for giving a correct and clever definition to Lord Geddes, to the latter's question about the meaning of the term algorithm. Lord Ashton gave the definition as "an algorithm is a set of rules that precisely defines a sequence of operations". The definition was said to "[rival] dictionary entries for clarity and succinctness—wrapped up in a historical allusion that he knew his classically educated interlocutor would understand."

In July 2019, Lord Ashton of Hyde was appointed Chief Whip in the House of Lords by new Prime Minister Boris Johnson. He was appointed to the Privy Council the following month.

In June 2024, Lord Ashton of Hyde was appointed Master of the Horse by King Charles III.

== Family ==
Descended from a cadet branch of the ancient Lancashire Assheton family, he married Emma Louise Allinson, daughter of Colin Allinson and Alison Palmer (née Bartholomew), in 1987; they have four daughters.

As he does not have any sons, the heir presumptive to the barony is his younger brother, the Hon. John Ashton.

== See also ==
- Baron Ashton of Hyde

=== Arms ===
Coat of arms of Henry Ashton, 4th Baron Ashton of Hyde

Coronet
That of a Baron
Crest
On a Mount Vert a Mower Proper vested paly Argent and Sable in the act of whetting his Scythe also Proper.
Helm
That of a Peer
Escutcheon
Sable on a Pile between two Crescents in base Argent a Mullet pierced of the First.
Supporters
Dexter, a Mower Proper vested paly Argent and Sable holding in the exterior hand a Scythe also Proper; Sinister, a Boar Argent semy of Mullets Sable pierced.
Motto
Fide et Virtute
(Eng: With faith and valour)

Political offices
Preceded by The Lord Taylor of Holbeach	Chief Whip of the House of Lords; 2019–2022	Succeeded by The Baroness Williams of Trafford
Preceded by The Lord Taylor of Holbeach	Captain of the Honourable Corps of Gentlemen-at-Arms; 2019–2022	Succeeded by The Baroness Williams of Trafford
Party political offices
Preceded by The Lord Taylor of Holbeach	Conservative Chief Whip in the House of Lords; 2019–2022	Succeeded by The Baroness Williams of Trafford
Parliament of the United Kingdom
Preceded by The Earl of Onslow	Elected hereditary peer to the House of Lords under the House of Lords Act 1999; 2011–2026	Position abolished under the House of Lords (Hereditary Peers) Act 2026
Peerage of the United Kingdom
Preceded by Thomas Ashton	Baron Ashton of Hyde; 2008–present	Incumbent; Heir presumptive: Hon. John Ashton
Court offices
Preceded by The Lord de Mauley	Master of the Horse; 2024–present	Incumbent
Order of precedence in England and Wales
Preceded by The Lord Benyon as Lord Chamberlain	Gentlemen as Master of the Horse	Followed by The Duke of Somerset
Order of precedence in Northern Ireland
Preceded by The Lord Benyon as Lord Chamberlain	Gentlemen as Master of the Horse	Followed by The Duke of Somerset
