= Robert de Ashton =

14th-century English nobleman and military officer

The Ashton coat-of-arms: Argent, a mullet sable pierced of the field

Sir Robert de Ashton (died 1385), also called Robert Assheton or Robert de Assheton, was a civil, military, and naval officer under Edward III of England who achieved distinction alike in court and camp, both by land and by sea.

== Family ==
Ashton was of the great northern family of Ashton or Assheton, of Ashton-under-Lyne, Lancashire.

Robert was also twice-married. By his first wife, Elizabeth de Gorges, Heiress of Tothill, he left a son, Thomas, and a daughter, Eleanor. His second wife was the widow of Lord Matthew de Gomey, and after Ashton's death she married the knight Sir John Tiptoft. She died in 1417.

== Career ==
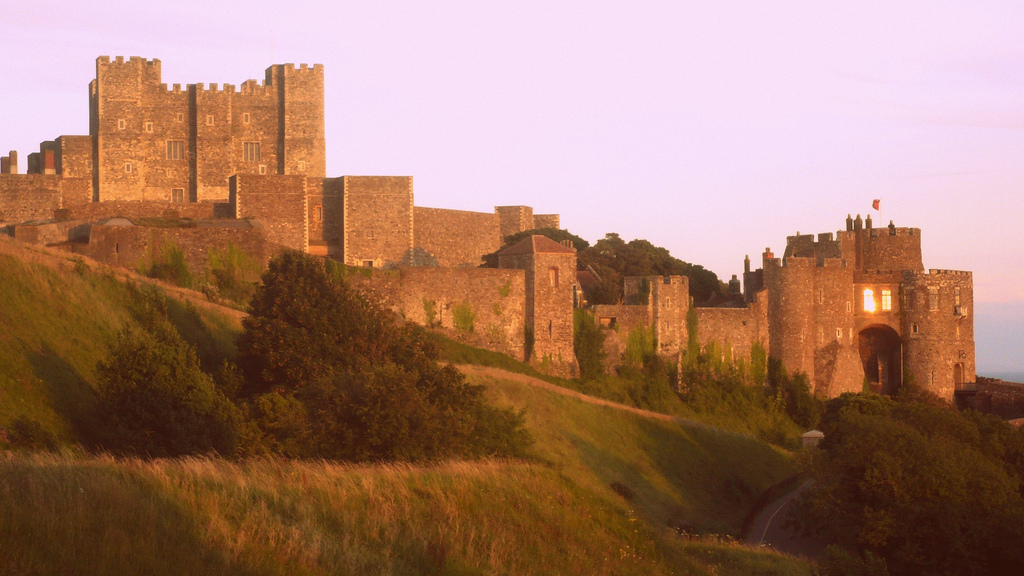
Dover Castle, where Sir Robert died

Sir Robert is first mentioned in 1324 as a member of the parliament of Westminster, and afterwards as occupying positions of great importance and trust. In 1359, he was governor of 'Guynes' near Calais; in 1362 he was Lord Treasurer of England; in 1368 he had custody of the castle of Sandgate near Calais with the lands and revenue thereto belonging; in 1369 he was admiral of the Narrow Seas; in 1372 he was Justiciar of Ireland, and in 1373 he was again Lord Treasurer of England and King's Chamberlain. In 1375, he became Chancellor of the Exchequer and held that office until the death of Edward III in 1377, when he was succeeded by Simon de Burley. From 1376 to 1381, Ashton was Constable of Portchester Castle, which he reinforced by building "Ashton's tower".

The new king did not discard his father's old servant, and in 1380 Ashton was appointed constable of Dover and warden of the Cinque Ports. He died at Dover Castle on 9 January 1385, and was buried in the church there, to which he had previously presented a large bell.
