= Thomas Ashton (industrialist) =

English cotton manufacturer and philanthropist

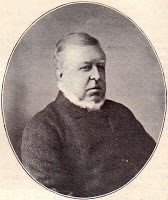
Thomas Ashton (1818–1898)

Thomas Ashton (8 December 1818 – 21 January 1898) was an English cotton manufacturer and philanthropist.

== Early life ==
Ashton was born on 8 December 1818 at Flowery Fields House, Hyde, then in Cheshire, sixth child to Thomas Ashton (1775–1845) and his wife, Harriet, née Booth.

The Ashton family owned mills in Hyde, Godley and Gerrards Wood which employed many hundreds of people. They were among the earliest cotton pioneers in Hyde. From 1800 they worked as a family business with mills at Gerrards Wood and Wilson Brook at Godley. Six brothers were involved in the business which, as well as coal and cotton, also established the calico printing works at Newton Bank. In 1823 the brothers separated, Samuel and Thomas taking the major shares; the former establishing himself at Apethorn Mill and soon after building Woodley Mill, while Thomas ran the factory at the Hollow. The Ashtons were particularly noted for running mills that did both spinning and weaving, a successful practice when most mills concentrated on one process.

== Career ==
Thomas studied chemistry and printing techniques at the University of Heidelberg in Germany in the late 1830s. He had inherited the cotton mills and the merchants' business in Manchester, 1845, and maintained the expansion programme initiated by his father, making the Flowery Fields mills complex the largest industrial concern in the district. The mills were considered to be 'The best of their class in the country, thoroughly equipped and conducted with every regard for the comfort and welfare of the operatives' (Bedford, Ashtons of Hyde).

Not only did Thomas carry on the Ashton family tradition he had inherited as an employer—that of an employer who realised his responsibilities to the men and women who worked for him—he improved on it. He enlarged the mill school, built a church at Flowery Fields, and expanded the village built by his father; he also established scholarships at the Hyde Mechanics' Institute and the technical school which enabled students to go to Owens College and to the Manchester Mechanics Institution. Care of his employees had always been an important factor to him, and during the cotton famine, when many mills were closed and most employers ruined, Thomas Ashton made sure that his mills never stopped.

In spite of immense personal and financial loss, he kept his workforce in full employment by setting them to work in his brickworks and building Throstle Bank Mill. Following his move to Ford Bank in Didsbury, Ashton maintained his strong links with the town of Hyde. He took a very active part in local politics, and succeeded in obtaining the charter of incorporation in 1881 for Hyde.

He was one of the first radicals elected to Hyde town council, and at the first meeting of the new authority, he was elected as alderman and also first mayor of Hyde in recognition of his work. He funded many projects and was also an active member of the Manchester branch of the National Educational League, which did much to prepare the way for the passing of the 1870 act. His work on the Hyde Relief Committee was one of the reasons that the city council gave him the freedom of the city in 1892.

In Manchester, where the family moved in the 1850s, Ashton was active in Liberal politics and in educational reform. He was a governor of Manchester Grammar School from 1869 and the leader of the campaign for the reform of Hulme's Charity, becoming its chairman in 1881. He was especially closely involved in the refoundation (or 'extension') of Owens College, which acknowledged him as its 'second founder'. He was a lifelong Unitarian.

As well as his many activities in Hyde and Manchester, Ashton served as High Sheriff of Lancashire and also as a magistrate for Cheshire and Lancashire. He was a leading member of the Liberal Party in Manchester. In 1882 he declined a baronetcy offered to him by William Gladstone, who became a close friend and who stayed at his Ford Bank home when he came to Manchester.

== Death and legacy ==
Thomas Ashton died at Ford Bank, Didsbury, on 21 January 1898, and was buried at Hyde Chapel three days later.

Due to the nature of his work, in particular his concern for his work force during the cotton famine, Professor Neil Bourne and Professor Andrew Curran decided to use his name when creating the Thomas Ashton Institute for Risk and Regulatory Research at the University of Manchester, an interdisciplinary research institute concerned with the understanding of failures that occur in the world of work leading to injury or ill-health.

== Family ==
With his wife Elizabeth Ashton née Gair, they had nine children:

- Harriet Gertrude Ashton (1853–86), married Arthur G. Lupton
- Elizabeth Marion Ashton (1854–1939), married James Bryce,1st Viscount Bryce.
- Thomas Gair Ashton (1855–1933), an industrialist and politician, later became the 1st Baron Ashton of Hyde. He married Eva James
- Margaret Ashton (1856–1937) was a local politician, elected member of Manchester City Council in 1908.
- Samuel Edgar Ashton (1857–80)
- William Mark Ashton (1858–95), married Letitia Kessler
- Katharine Ashton (1859–1940) married Charles Lupton.
- Grace Mary Ashton (1860–1948), married Philip W. Kessler
- Charlotte Jane Ashton (1861–1924), married Edward Tootal Broadhurst 1st Baronet, a director and eventually chairman of Tootal Broadhurst Lee.
