= Thomas Ashton, 3rd Baron Ashton of Hyde =

British baron and banker (1926–2008)

Major The Right Honourable The Lord Ashton of Hyde TD JP

Member of the House of Lords
- Lord Temporal
- as a hereditary peer 21 March 1983 – 11 November 1999
- Preceded by: The 2nd Baron Ashton of Hyde
- Succeeded by: Seat abolished (Note: Pursuant to the House of Lords Act 1999.)

Personal details
- Born: Thomas John Ashton; 19 November 1926
- Died: 2 August 2008 (aged 81)
- Spouse: Pauline Trewlove Brackenbury
- Parents: Thomas Ashton, 2nd Baron Ashton of Hyde (father); Marjorie Nell Brookes (mother)

Thomas John Ashton, 3rd Baron Ashton of Hyde (19 November 1926 – 2 August 2008), was the eldest son of Thomas Ashton, 2nd Baron Ashton of Hyde, and his wife Marjorie Nell Brookes. He succeeded his father as Baron Ashton of Hyde on the latter's death on 21 March 1983.

== Education and career ==
He attended Eton College, and New College, Oxford. He gained the rank of major with the Royal Gloucestershire Hussars. He held the office of Justice of the Peace for Oxfordshire, 1965–1968. He was a director of Barclays Bank, 1969–1987.

== Family ==
He married Pauline Trewlove Brackenbury, daughter of Lt.-Col. Robert Henry Langton Brackenbury, on 18 May 1957, and has issue:

- Thomas Henry Ashton, 4th Baron Ashton of Hyde (born 1958)
- Charlotte Trewlove Ashton (born 1960), married Andrew D. Bartlett, 1987
- Katharine Judith Ashton (born 1962), married Douglas J. Lawson, 1987
- John Edward Ashton (born 1966)

== Notes ==
Peerage of the United Kingdom
Preceded by Thomas Ashton	Baron Ashton of Hyde; 1983–2008; Member of the House of Lords (1983–1999)	Succeeded by Henry Ashton
