= Duchess of York Hospital =

English hospital (1914–1986)

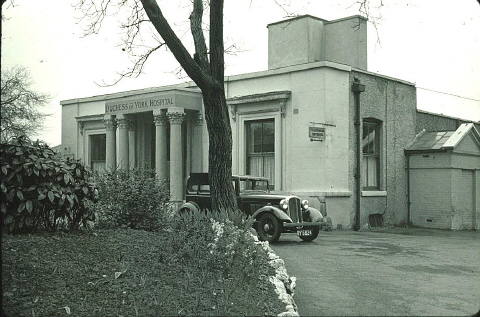
- The Duchess of York Hospital for Babies in 1953

- Shown in Greater Manchester

Geography
- Location: Levenshulme, Greater Manchester, England, United Kingdom
- Coordinates: 53.4394°N 2.1994°W

Organisation
- Care system: Public NHS
- Type: Children's

History
- Founded: 1914; 112 years ago
- Closed: 1986

Links
- Lists: Hospitals in England

The Duchess of York Hospital was a children's hospital in Manchester.

== History ==
The facility opened as the Manchester Babies Hospital on 4 August 1914. Catherine Chisholm was instrumental in establishing the hospital and was one of the first consultants there. The hospital was created as a small facility with 12 beds, aimed at providing specialist care for the "...more effective treatment of babies and very young children suffering from diarrhea and other gastrointestinal disorders." It was based on the model of the London Infants Hospital but, as with the Clapham Maternity Hospital, all the doctors were female.

In 1919, the hospital moved to Cringle Hall in Burnage, having previously been in Levenshulme and Chorlton-on-Medlock. It then had 50 beds; the number of patients increased from 82 in the first year to 430 in 1929. After the building of a new pavilion on the open-air principle with glass wards specially designed for the treatment of rickets in 1925, the number of cots rose to 80. In June 1935, a new hospital wing with much improved surgical facilities was opened by the Duchess of York. The whole facility was renamed the Duchess of York Hospital for Babies.

Until the creation of the National Health Service in 1948, the hospital was supported by the Corporation of Manchester and by voluntary contributions. It was renamed the Duchess of York Hospital in 1981 and, after it closed in 1986, a new Duchess of York ward was opened in Withington Hospital.
