= Darwell Wood =

Coordinates: 50.955°N 0.433°E

- Site of Special Scientific Interest
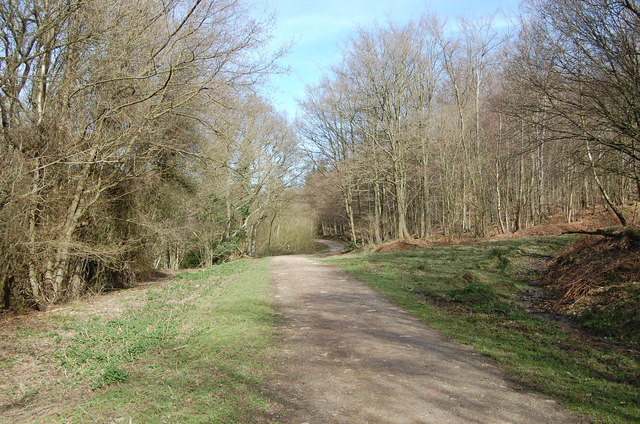
- Location of Darwell Wood.
- Area of search: East Sussex
- Grid reference: TQ 710 201
- Interest: Biological
- Area: 37.5 hectares (93 acres)
- Notification date: 1986
- Location map: Magic Map

Darwell Wood is a 37.5-hectare (93-acre) biological Site of Special Scientific Interest north-west of Battle in East Sussex.

== Species ==
Most of the wood is made-up of coppices of hornbeam (Carpinus betulus) with oak (Quercus robur) standards. Under the dense tree canopy, mosses mainly grow with a few patches of bluebells (Hyacinthoides nonscripta), also blackberry (Rubus fruticosus) and wood sorrel (Oxalis acetosella) can be found. On the higher grounds, the woodland becomes more open, with silver birch (Betula pendula) and hazel (Corylus avellana) and some sweet chestnut (Castanea sativa) coppice areas. The ground flora of the woodland has wood sage (Teucrium scorodonia), bracken (Pteridium aquilinum) and sanicle (Sanicula europaea). On the west of the site, calcareous (chalky) soils help support an ash (Fraxinus excelsior) growth underplanted by mosses, ramsons (Allium ursinum), bee and pyramidal orchids (Ophrys apifera) and (Anacamptis pyramidalis). The streams which pass through the site have eroded deeply into the rock layer to produce steep sided valleys. These valleys have alder (Alnus glutinosa), with local abundances of grey willow (Salix cinerea) above a ground flora of pendulous sedge (Carex pendula), water mint (Mentha aquatica), opposite-leaved golden saxifrage (Chrysosplenium oppositifolium) and ragged robin (Lychnis flos-cuculi).
