= Baron Ashton of Hyde =

Title in the Peerage of the United Kingdom

- Sable on a pile between two crescents in base argent a mullet pierced of the first
- Creation date: 28 June 1911
- Created by: George V
- Peerage: United Kingdom
- First holder: Thomas Gair Ashton
- Present holder: Henry Ashton, 4th Baron
- Heir presumptive: Thomas Henry Ashton
- Remainder to: 1st Baron's heirs male of the body lawfully begotten.
- Motto: Fide et virtute ("With faith and valour")

Baron Ashton of Hyde, of Hyde in the County of Chester, is a title in the Peerage of the United Kingdom. It was created on 28 June 1911 for the industrialist and Liberal politician Thomas Ashton. He had earlier represented Hyde and Luton in the House of Commons.

Since 2008, the title has been held by his great-grandson, the fourth Baron, who won a by-election to the House of Lords in July 2011, taking the Earl of Onslow's room. Ashton was appointed Chief Whip and Captain of the Honourable Corps of Gentlemen-at-Arms in July 2019.

== Baron Ashton of Hyde (1911) ==
- Thomas Gair Ashton, 1st Baron Ashton of Hyde (1855–1933)
- Thomas Henry Raymond Ashton, 2nd Baron Ashton of Hyde (1901–1983)
- Thomas John Ashton, 3rd Baron Ashton of Hyde (1926–2008)
- (Thomas) Henry Ashton, 4th Baron Ashton of Hyde (born 1958)

The heir presumptive is the present holder's brother, the Hon. John Edward Ashton (born 1966).
As of 2025, there are no further heirs to the barony.

== See also ==
- Baron Ashton
