= Thomas Ashton, 2nd Baron Ashton of Hyde =

British aristocrat

The Lord Ashton of Hyde
- Thomas Ashton
- Ashton in April 1925.
- Born: 2 October 1901
- Died: 21 March 1983 (aged 81)
- Spouse: Marjorie Nell Brookes
- Father: Thomas Gair Ashton
- Mother: Eva Margaret James

Thomas Henry Raymond Ashton, 2nd Baron Ashton of Hyde JP DL (2 October 1901 – 21 March 1983). The son of Thomas Gair Ashton, 1st Baron Ashton of Hyde and Eva Margaret James. He succeeded his father as 2nd Baron Ashton of Hyde on the latter's death on 1 May 1933. On his death in 1983 he was succeeded in the barony by his son.

== Education and family ==
He attended Eton College, and New College, Oxford. His uncle was Charles Lupton, Lord Mayor of Leeds whose funeral he attended in 1935.

== Career ==
He gained the rank of Major with the 1st Royal Gloucestershire Hussars. He held the office of Justice of the Peace for Gloucestershire in 1944, and was Deputy Lieutenant of Gloucestershire in 1957.

== Family ==
He married Marjorie Nell Brooks (1901-1993), daughter of Marshall Jones Brooks and Florence Thomas, on 10 June 1925, and had issue:

- Thomas John Ashton, 3rd Baron Ashton of Hyde (1926–2008)
- Susan Ashton (b. 1931), died in infancy
- Judith Marjorie Ashton (1934–1943)

== Notes ==
Peerage of the United Kingdom
Preceded by Thomas Ashton	Baron Ashton of Hyde; 1933–1983	Succeeded by Thomas Ashton
