= Thomas Ashton, 1st Baron Ashton of Hyde =

British politician

The Right Honourable The Lord Ashton of Hyde
- Ashton in 1895

Personal details
- Born: 5 February 1855 Fallowfield, England
- Died: 1 May 1933 (aged 78)
- Parent: Thomas Ashton (father)

Thomas Gair Ashton, 1st Baron Ashton of Hyde (5 February 1855 – 1 May 1933), also known as Lord Ashton, was a British industrialist, philanthropist, Liberal politician and peer.

== Early life and career ==
Ashton was born at Fallowfield, Manchester, Lancashire, the son of Thomas Ashton (died 1898) and Elizabeth Gair, daughter of Samuel Stillman Gair (1789–1847) of Rhode Island. Ashton was baptised on 5 February 1855. The Ashton family had been prominent in the cotton and cloth manufacturing industry for many years. He was educated at Rugby School and University College, Oxford, and later managed the family business.

== Political career ==
Ashton was elected to the House of Commons for Hyde in 1885 but lost his seat the following year. Ashton then married Eva Margret James in 1866 at All Saints Church. He unsuccessfully contested the same seat again in 1892, but in 1895 he was returned for Luton, a seat he held until 1911. That year, he was raised to the peerage as Baron Ashton of Hyde in the County of Chester. During the First World War, he served as Chairman of the Cotton Exports Committee.

Apart from his political career, Ashton was a Justice of the Peace for Cheshire and Mountfield, East Sussex, elected to membership of the Manchester Literary and Philosophical Society on 18 October1881 and was invested as an Honorary Fellow of Oxford University in 1923.

== Family ==
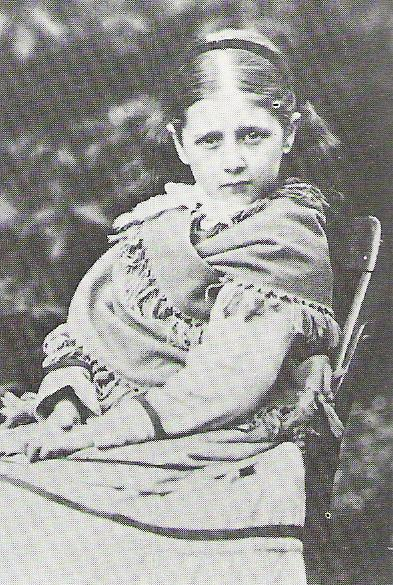
Lord Ashton's first cousin-once removed was Beatrix Potter

Two of Ashton's sisters married the Lupton brothers: Sir Charles Lupton to Katharine and Arthur Lupton to Harriet. Lord Ashton's first cousin, Helen Potter (née Leech 1839–1932), was the mother of Beatrix Potter. Sister Elizabeth Marion Ashton married James Bryce. Ashton married Eva Margaret James, daughter of John Henry James, JP for Hertfordshire, and his wife, Jane Ramsden Ashworth, in 1886. They had four children: two sons and two daughters:

- Thomas Henry Ashton (8 October 1887 – 20 September 1897)
- Marion Evelyn Ashton (born 1890) married Major Robert Wood.
- Margaret Joan Ashton (born 1893) married Hugh Whistler.
- Thomas Henry Raymond Ashton (2 October 1901 – 21 March 1983) succeeded his father in the barony.

== Death ==
Ashton died on 1 May 1933, aged 78, in Vinehall Street, Sussex, and was succeeded in the title by his second but eldest-surviving son, Thomas Henry Raymond Ashton. Lady Ashton of Hyde died in 1938.

== Sources ==
- Legg, L. G. Wickham Legg (editor). The Dictionary of National Biography, 1931-1940. Oxford University Press, 1949.
- Kidd, Charles, Williamson, David (editors). Debrett's Peerage and Baronetage (1990 edition). New York: St Martin's Press, 1990,
- Leigh Rayment's Peerage Pages
- Leigh Rayment's Historical List of MPs

Parliament of the United Kingdom
| New constituency | Member of Parliament for Hyde; 1885–1886 | Succeeded by Joseph Watson Sidebotham |
| Preceded by Samuel Whitbread | Member of Parliament for Luton; 1895–1911 | Succeeded by Cecil Harmsworth |
Peerage of the United Kingdom
| New creation | Baron Ashton of Hyde; 1911–1933 | Succeeded by Thomas Ashton |
