= Rodmell =

Village and parish in East Sussex, England

Coordinates: 50.83581°N 0.01340°E

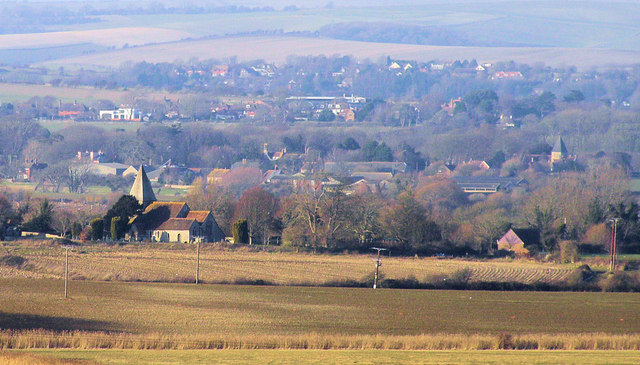
- Rodmell, Iford and Kingston from Itford Hill, Southease

- Location within East Sussex
- Area: 11.3 km^{2} (4.4 sq mi) -inc Southease
- Population: 527 (Parish-2011)
  - Density: 116/sq mi (45/km^{2})
- OS grid reference: TQ418059
  - London: 46 miles (74 km) N
- District: Lewes
- Shire county: East Sussex
- Region: South East
- Country: England
- Sovereign state: United Kingdom
- Post town: LEWES
- Postcode district: BN7
- Dialling code: 01273
- Police: Sussex
- Fire: East Sussex
- Ambulance: South East Coast
- UK Parliament: Lewes
- Website: http://www.rodmell.net/

Rodmell is a small village and civil parish in the Lewes District of East Sussex, England. It is located three miles (4.8 km) south-east of Lewes, on the Lewes to Newhaven road and six and a half miles from the City of Brighton & Hove and is situated by the west banks of the River Ouse. The village is served by Southease railway station, opened in 1906. The Prime Meridian passes just to the west of the village.

The village name has been variously spelled as Ramelle or Redmelle (11th century), Redmelde (12th century), Radmelde (13th century) and Radmill (18th century). It most likely derives from Brittonic where Rhod denotes a wheel and Melin refers to a Mill, hence mill wheel. A less likely derivation is from Old English read *mylde, "[place with] red soil". Before the time of the Norman conquest the manor of Rodmell was held by King Harold II. Rodmell was a significant settlement at the time the Domesday Book was compiled in 1086, with 153 households. Between 1091 and 1095 the church was granted to Lewes Priory by William de Warenne, 2nd Earl of Surrey. The early Norman church is dedicated to St Peter. The font is believed to be Saxon, predating the building itself. More recently, Monk's House was the home of the author Virginia Woolf for twenty-one years until her suicide in 1941.

The village is bisected by the road from Lewes to Newhaven which passes through Iford. This road also passes the neighbouring village of Southease.

The village was part of the Holmstrow hundred until the abolition of hundreds in the 19th century.

== Notable buildings and areas ==
Notable areas around Rodmell

Like many of the county's southern parishes, Rodmell, is a long thin parish. From southeast to the northwest, it runs from Saltdean over the South Downs to the Lewes Brooks and as far as the River Ouse. To the north is the Iford parish and to the south is Southease.

There are many reasons why the Downland area is special as well. The South Downs Way crosses the scarp top. West from the track, on the Down between Highdole Hill and Fore Hill, there are many surviving marks from a busy Iron Age and Roman village. It used to be called ‘Isenden’, a Tolkienesque name, which sounds like it meant ‘Ouse dean’. Unusually, the long and convoluted dry valley behind the scarp does not drain southwards to the sea, but easterly, then northerly to the Brooks and the Ouse. There are also many surviving Down pasture sites that deserve to be known better. Michael Light, a worker at South Farm, has written a book/pamphlet with a number of editions recording the birds he has seen in the parish. In 2005 he recorded turtle dove, barn owl and little owl breeding in the area. He also recorded dotterel and yellow wagtail on passage on the flooded arable fields.

=== St Peter's Church ===
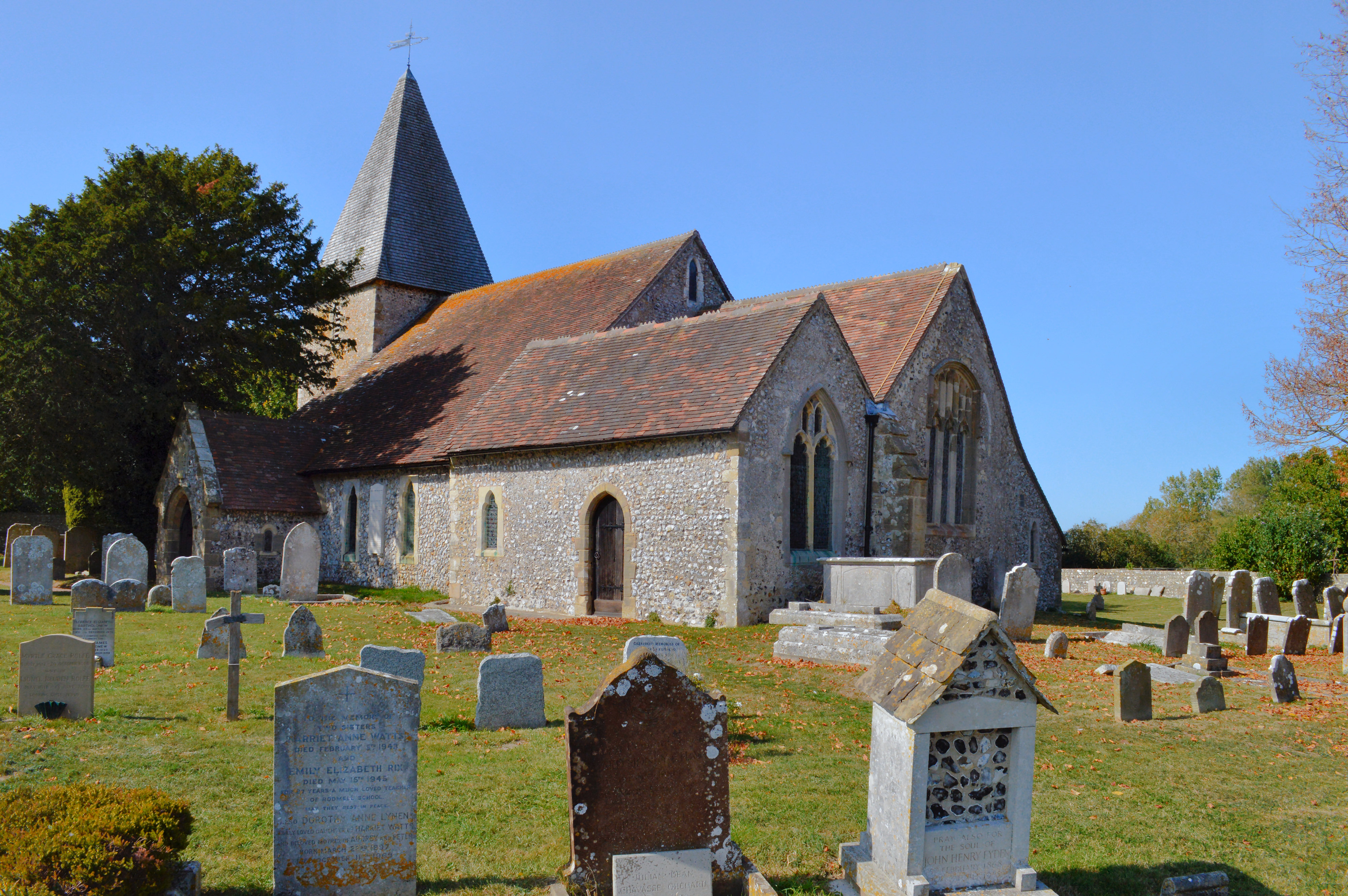
St Peter's Church

St Peter's Church is the parish church and dates from the 12th century. It is a Grade I listed building and unlike many churches it has retained its original features. Consequently it is among the earliest surviving examples of Norman architecture in the country.

=== Lewes Brooks ===
There is a Site of Special Scientific Interest (SSSI) within the parish. Lewes Brooks is of biological importance and is part of the flood plain of the River Ouse. It provides a habitat for many other invertebrates such as water beetles and snails.

=== Monk's House ===
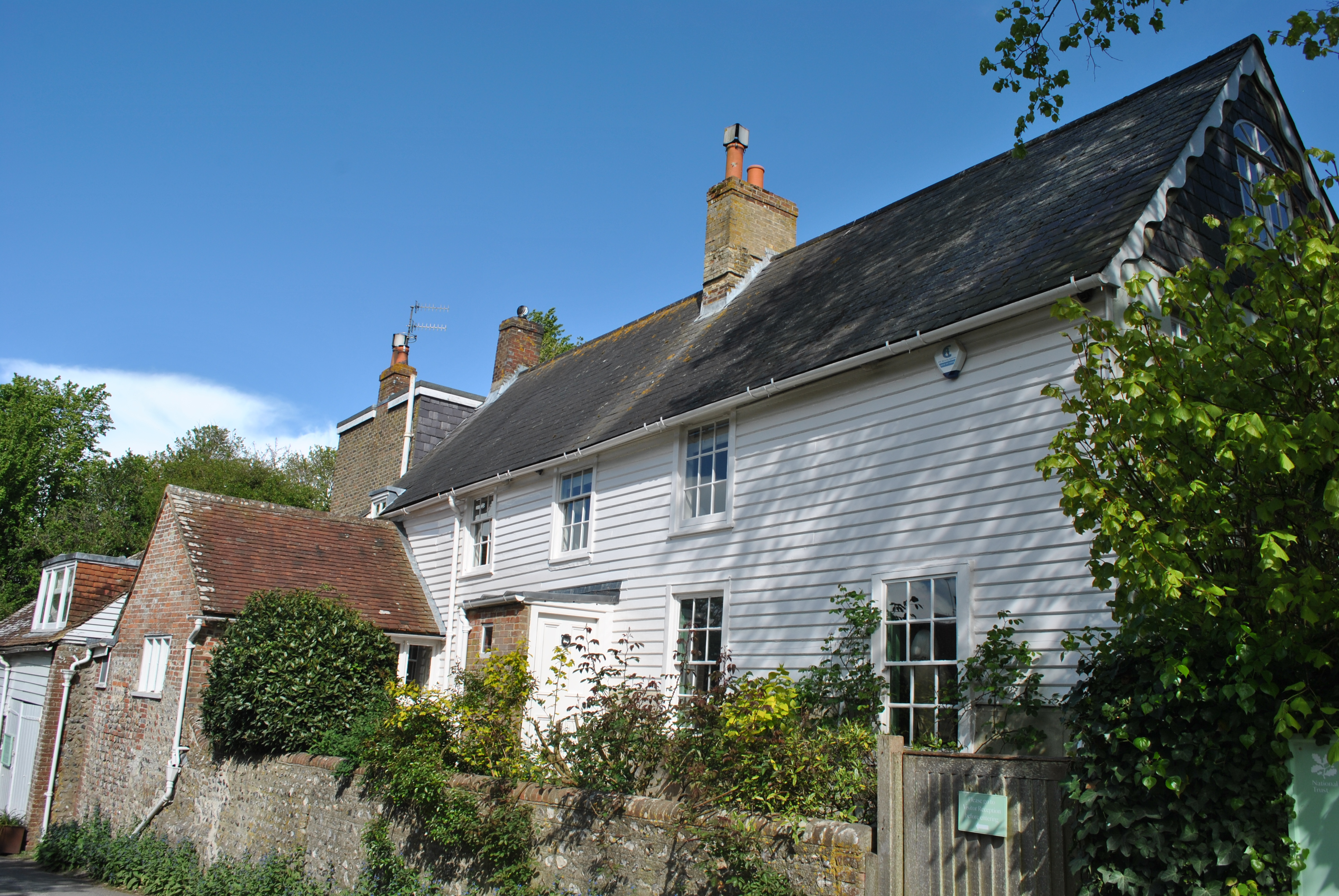
Monk's House

Monk's House is 16th-century weatherboarded cottage that is owned by the National Trust. It lies on the village's eastern boundary with the Lewes Brooks. It was inhabited by members of the Bloomsbury Group, Leonard and the novelist Virginia Woolf, from 1919 until Leonard's death in 1969.

=== Northease Manor ===
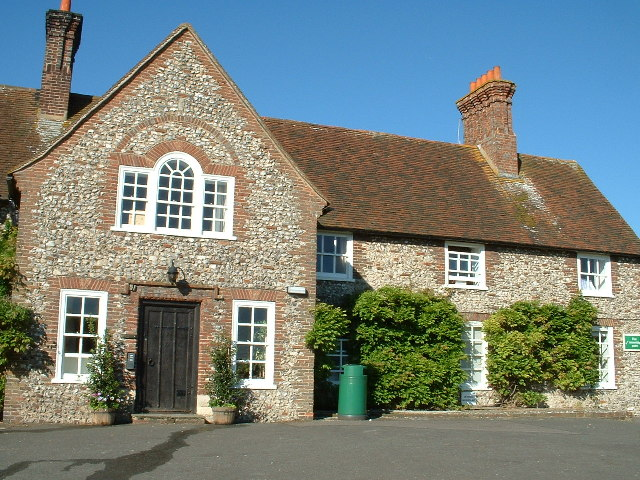
Northease Manor School

The historic Northease Manor is located between Rodmell and Southease. Originally a chapelry and then a private house, it has been a private school since the late 1960s. The main building dates from the 17th Century; a large thatched barn known as the "Tudor Hall" and the walls of an adjacent building are significantly older.

=== Mill Hill ===
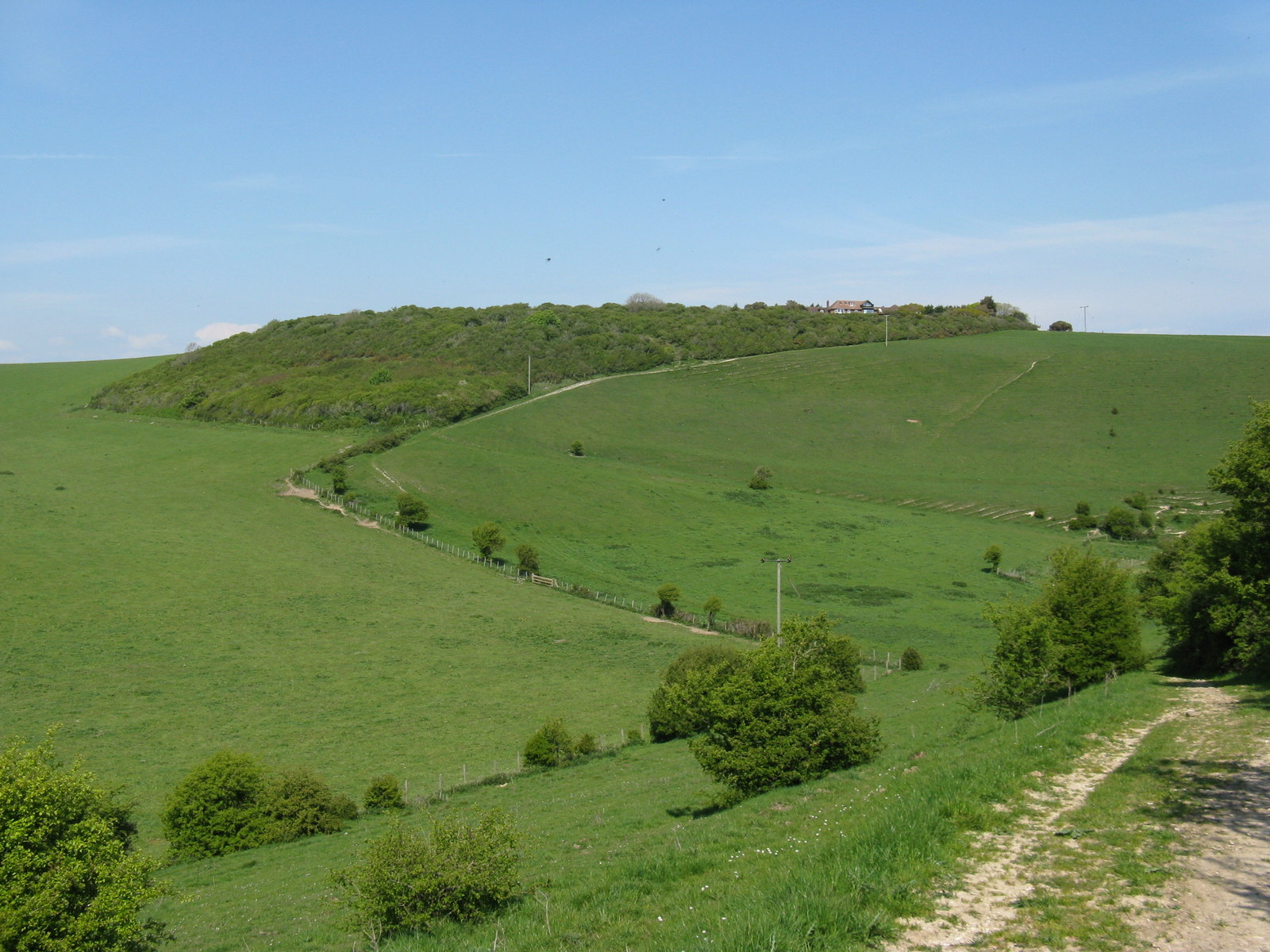
Mill Hill

Running west from the Village up the scarp slope is Mill Hill (TQ 412 052). This landscape is full of impressive viewpoints. Standing on Mill Hill is almost like being on a cliff from which you can see down to Seaford Bay and across to the long shoulder of Southease Hill. Often such steep slopes have been saved from intensive farming and the agrochemicals that implies, but unfortunately Mill Hill was not spared. Only at its base and along the old drove footpath on its northern edge does the old wildlife survive intact. Now it is well managed though and the herbs and insects are returning. Along the footpath edge you can still find bastard toadflax and horseshoe vetch. At the southern end the Northease White Way cuts a substantial bostal and there are two chalk pits by its side. The Down pasture above the Whiteway (TQ 405 059) is a flowery spot in summer.

=== Breaky Bottom ===
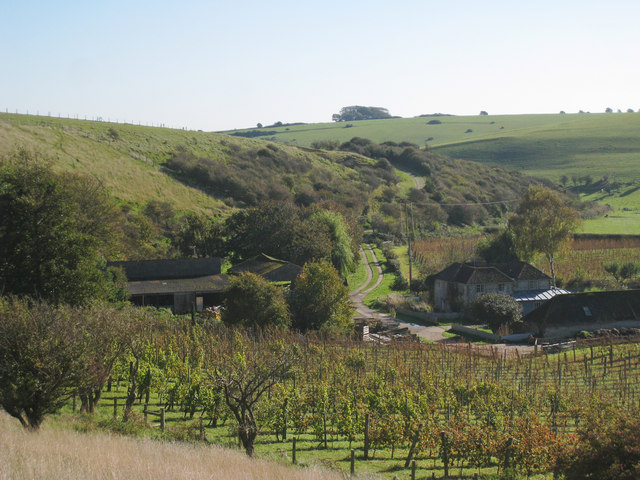
Breaky Bottom vineyard

Breaky Bottom is the name of a valley within the parish. It is owned by Peter Hall who created Breaky Bottom vineyard in 1974. The vineyard produces a well-known English wine and was a former gold medallist in the Wine Magazine International Wine Challenge. The slope to the southwest of the vineyard (TQ 401 050) has retained some of its old Down pasture flora. Above it on the spur is a round barrow (TQ 401 049). To the east of farm is Access Land which continues north into the Iford parish and Whiteway Bottom.

=== Highdole Hill ===
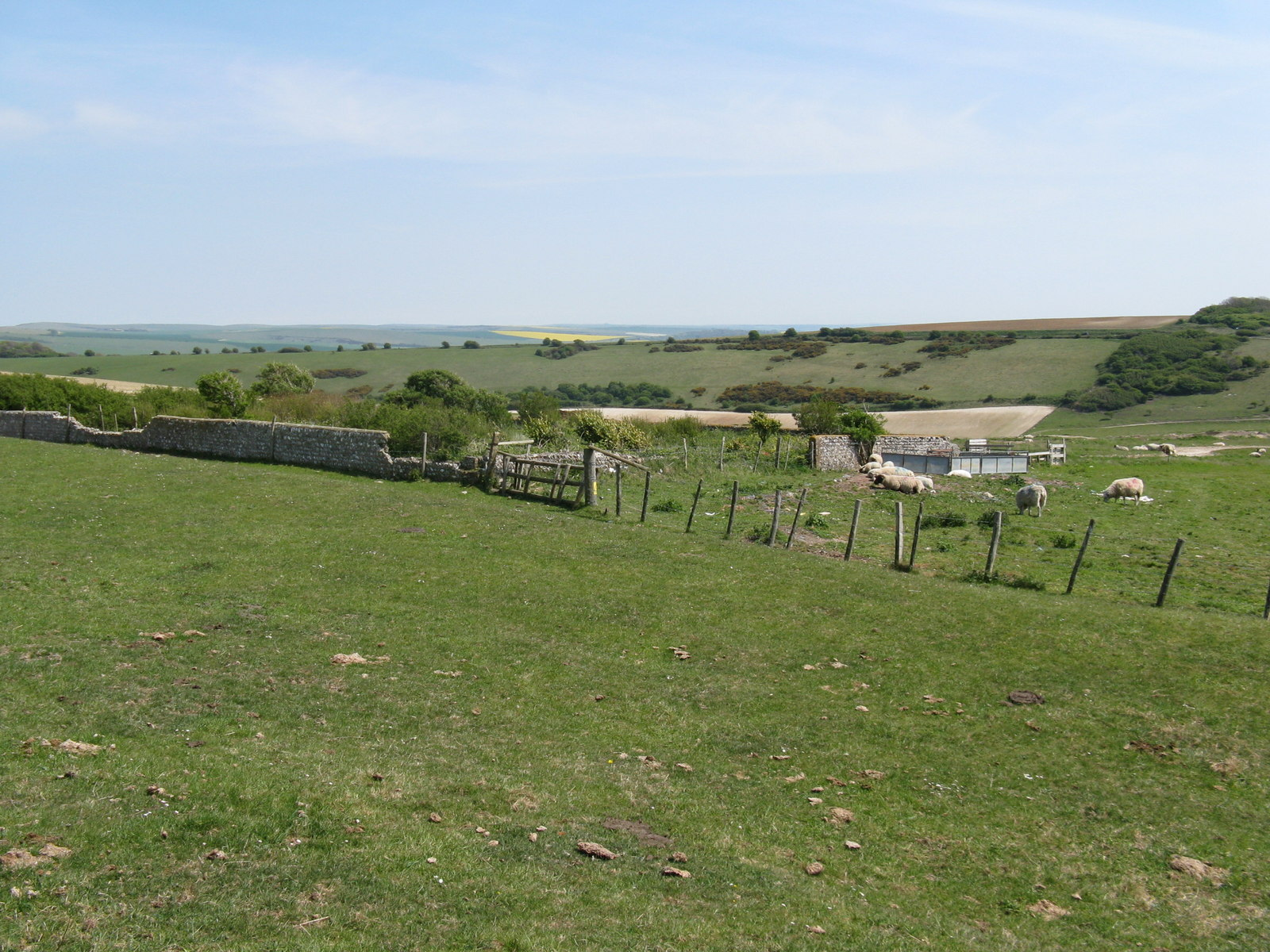
Old sheepfold between Highdole Hill and Fore Hill

You can walk to Highdole Hill (TQ 397 045) up the spine of Telscombe Tye. At the summit you have views of the sea, distant glimpses of the Weald and white cliffs and what strikes many walkers is the silence because, despite its height, the sound of roads do not reach here.

The lost Romano-British village of Isenden sits on the hill. In the 1930s it was excavated and Roman bronze, iron, tiles, querns, pottery and two bronze coins were found. The huts of the village on the hilltop seem to have been arranged around a banked roadway, with other roadways nearby and many small fields and barrows. The findings suggested that the village was occupied shortly before the Roman invasion and abandoned in about AD 350. It is now a designated scheduled monument. Unfortunately, modern ploughing has destroyed most of these remains. The village remains are now more obvious towards Fore Hill, near the flint-walled sheepfold (TQ 404 043). There the pasture has preserved a muddle of field lynchets and round barrows there.

=== Fore Hill ===
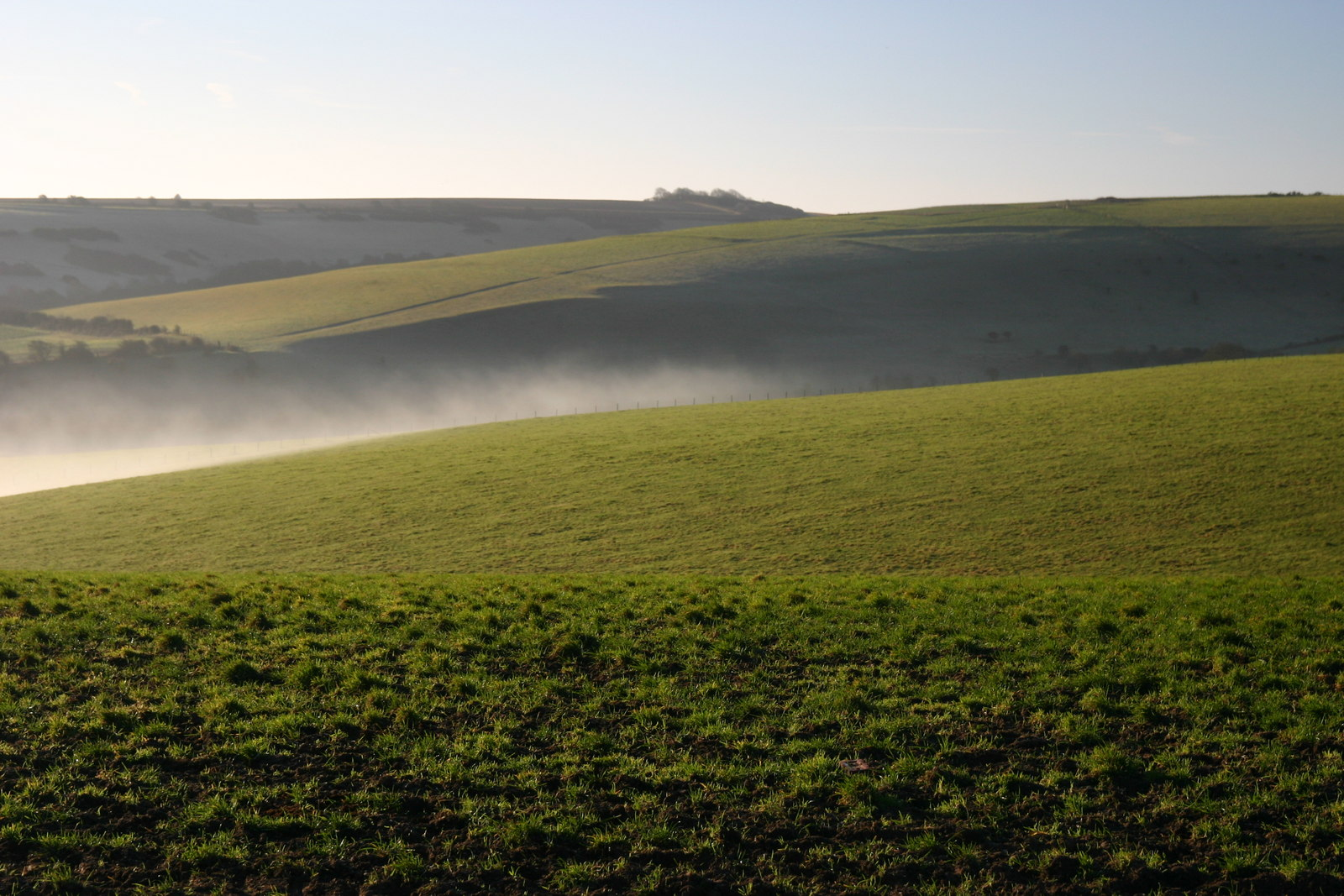
Greenwich Meridian on Mill Hill and Fore Hill

To the east of High Dole is Fore Hill. The Greenwich meridian line runs through it. On its steep northern slope (TQ 406 047) the chalk grassland is well preserved, with lots of cowslips, harebells, devil’s-bit scabious and rampion. The steepest bit to the southeast overlooks Cricketing Bottom and many traditional flowers survive including dropwort, thyme and cowslips. Marbled white and common blue butterflies enjoy the sunny slopes.

== Governance ==
Rodmell Parish Council has seven councillors. Their responsibilities include footpaths, street lighting, playgrounds and minor planning applications.

The next level of government is the district council. The parish of Rodmell lies within the Kingston ward of Lewes District Council, which returns a single councillor.

East Sussex County Council is the next tier of government, for which Rodmell is within the Newhaven and Ouse Valley West division, with responsibility for Education, Libraries, Social Services, Civil Registration, Trading Standards and Transport. Elections for the County Council are held every four years. The Liberal Democrat Carla Butler was elected in the 2013 election.

The UK Parliament constituency for Rodmell is Lewes. The Liberal Democrat Norman Baker served as the constituency MP from 1997 but the Conservative Maria Caulfield was elected in 2015. As of July 2024, Liberal Democrat James MacCleary is the MP.

Prior to Brexit in 2020, the village was part of the South East England constituency in the European Parliament.

== Notable people ==
- The lyrical novelist Virginia Woolf lived in Monk's House for twenty-one years until her death. She left the house for the last time on 28 March 1941, took a walk through the local fields, and drowned herself in the nearby River Ouse. Her husband Leonard Woolf continued to live there until his death in 1969. The house was bought by the University of Sussex as Virginia's papers had been left to the university. It was acquired and restored by the National Trust.
- The composer Benjamin Frankel and his wife Anna lived at Rodmell Hill, next door to Leonard Woolf, from 1952 until 1958.
- Captain F. W. Hartman and his wife Dorothy lived at Northease Manor during the 1930s. Captain Hartman was Master of the Southdown Hunt now the Southdown and Eridge Hunt. As Master of Fox Hounds, he hosted a Hunt Ball at Northease in January 1938 which was reported in The Times. He and his wife were directors of Lendrum & Hartman, sole concessionaires of imported Buick and Cadillac cars from America. They supplied King Edward VIII with a custom-built Buick in 1936, which was transported with him by warship to France on his abdication.
- The Rev. Henry Goodman, a Nonconformist preacher, who was ejected from the church after the 1660 Stuart Restoration. On 29 May 1670 he went down to Lewes to preach at the request of his friends. "Great caution was used to prevent danger; but some informers slyly mixed with the audience. He preached on Eph. v. 16, "Redeeming the time", whereas they fixed on the words following "because the days are evil". Mr. Goodman, living at a distance, escaped the fine; but unconscionable fines were levied on many of his hearers, and they were levied still more unconscionably."

== In popular culture ==
Rodmell was the venue of a local cricket match which was immortalised by A. G. Macdonell in his humorous novel England, Their England, in which it was called "Fordenden, Kent". Rodmell is the name of a traditional English tune given to the office hymn for Holy Innocents' Day 'When Christ was born in Bethlehem' by Laurence Housman 1865-1959 (New English Hymnal #203).

== See also ==
- Lewes and Laughton Levels
