= Southease =

Village and parish in East Sussex, England

Coordinates: 50.83°N 0.02°E

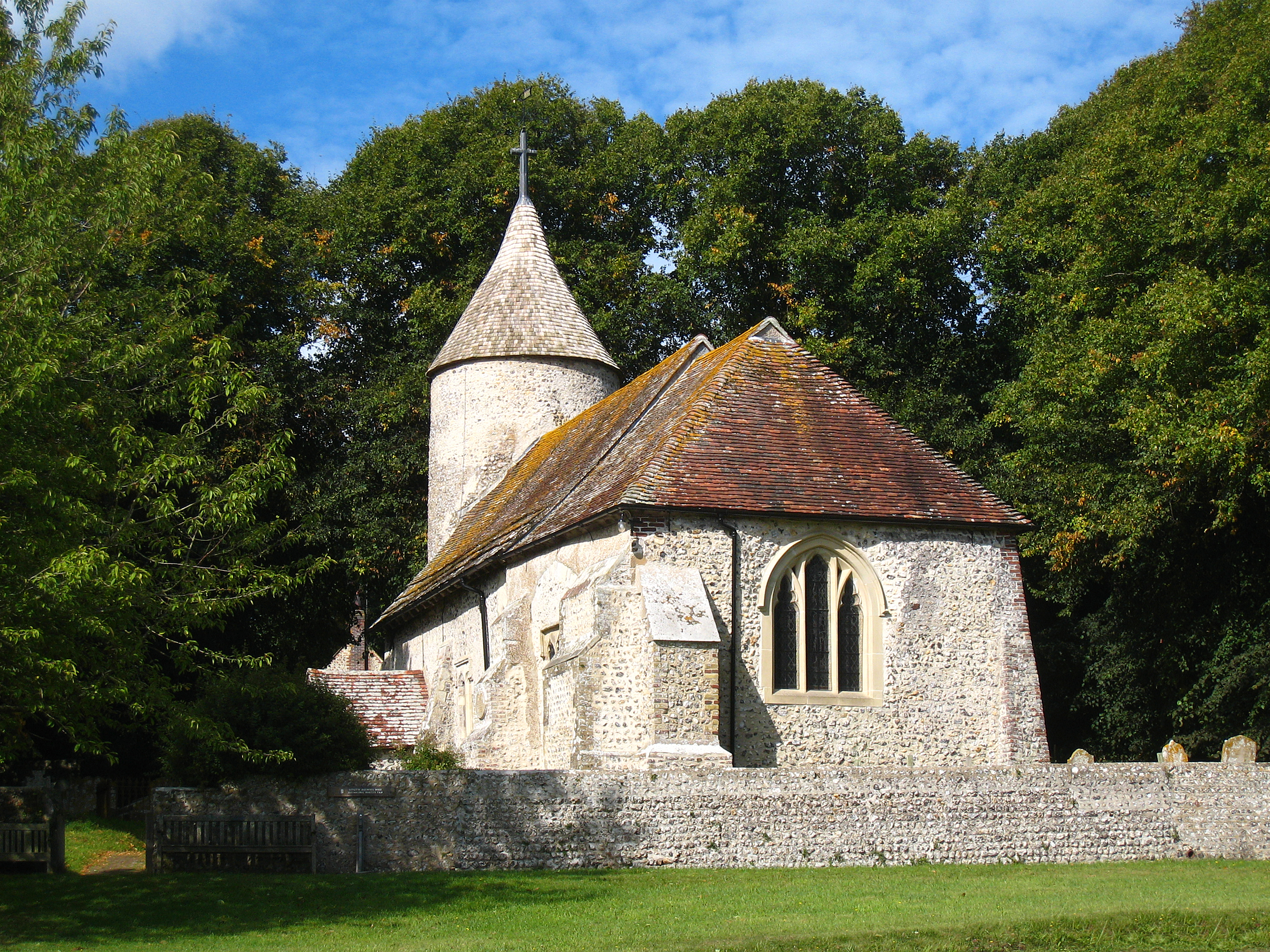
- St Peter’s Church, Southease

- Location within East Sussex
- Area: 11.26 km^{2} (4.35 sq mi) -Rodmell & Southease
- Population: 502 (2007)
  - Density: 115.5/sq mi (44.6/km^{2})
- OS grid reference: TQ421053
  - London: 47 miles (76 km) N
- District: Lewes
- Shire county: East Sussex
- Region: South East
- Country: England
- Sovereign state: United Kingdom
- Post town: LEWES
- Postcode district: BN7
- Dialling code: 01273
- Police: Sussex
- Fire: East Sussex
- Ambulance: South East Coast
- UK Parliament: Lewes

Southease is a small village and civil parish in East Sussex, in South East England between the A26 road and the C7 road from Lewes to Newhaven. The village is to the west of the River Ouse, Sussex and has a church dedicated to Saint Peter. Southease railway station lies roughly a kilometre east over the river and may be reached via a swing bridge.

The church has one of only three round towers in Sussex, all of which are located in the Ouse Valley and all three built in the first half of the 12th century.

It is downstream of Lewes, the county town of East Sussex and upstream of Piddinghoe and Newhaven. Paths along both the banks of the river allow hiking in either direction along the river. The remains of a slipway on the west bank of the Ouse just north of the bridge faces Mount Caburn. The nearest village is Rodmell, about a kilometre to the northwest.

The South Downs Way winds its way through the village towards the nearby River Ouse and the railway station. A new bridge has been built over the A26.

Most cottages in the village date from the 17th century.

== History ==
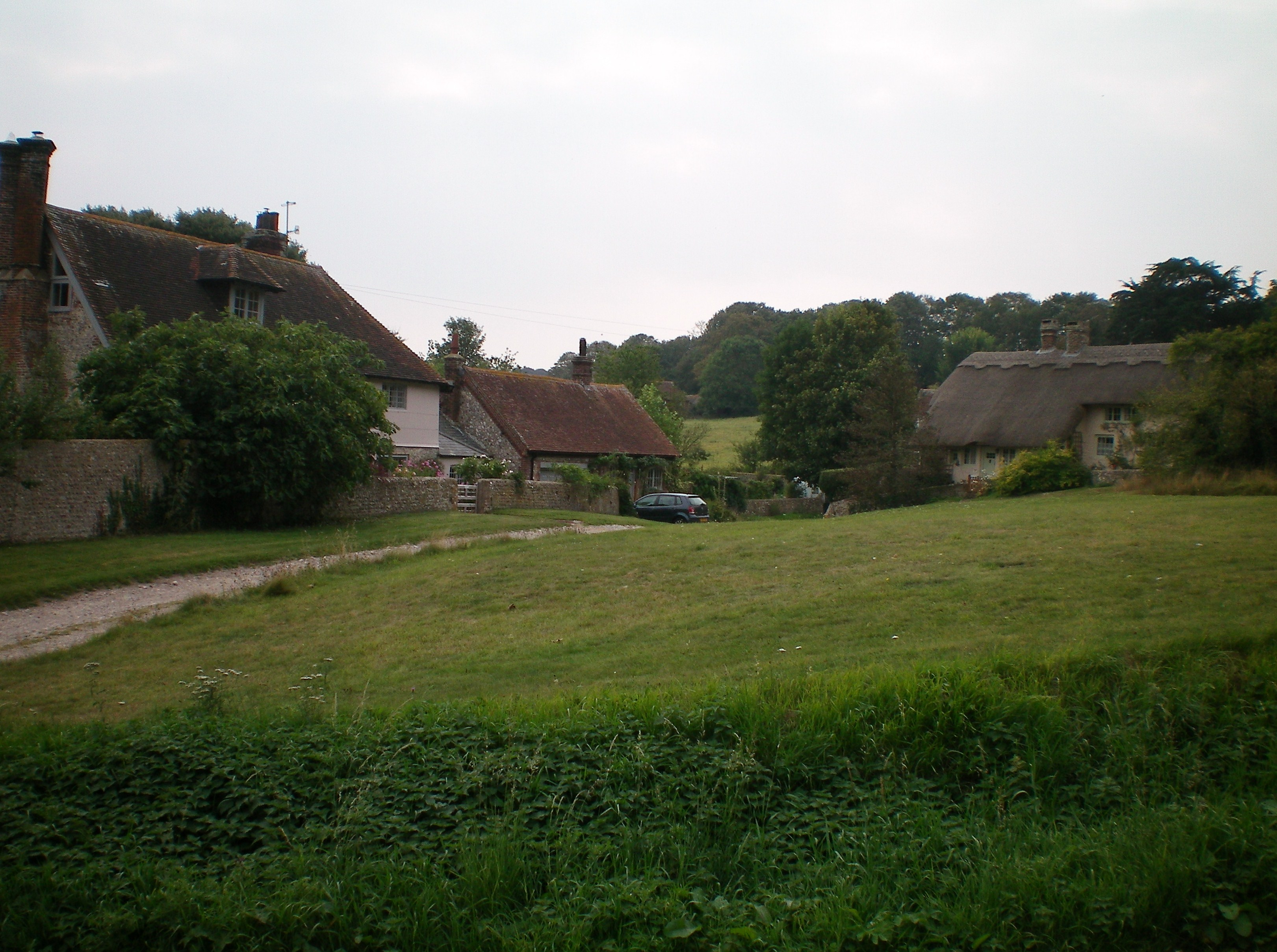
Southease Green

=== Name ===
The name seems to be of Anglo-Saxon origin, meaning "South land overgrown with brushwood". It is possible that Northease and Southease take their names from the Rodmell salt industry for the reference to brushwood could have indicated a small coppice industry provisioning the salt rendering ovens. Now little remains of the saltern mounds, for the big farmers have ploughed the land where they once stood.

=== Historical record ===
The village first appears in the historical record when King Edgar granted the manor of Southease (including Southease parish, 38 hides, a church and part of South Heighton) to Hyde Abbey. It was granted to the abbey again by King Æthelred in 996. The church dates from the year 966. The village is noted in the Domesday Book of 1086 as comprising 60 households, a significant settlement at the time. Included in the listing are ploughlands, meadows and a church.

Village history is closely linked with the Ouse and Lewes Levels. In the 11th to 13th centuries drainage of the river allowed more crops to be grown, but subsequent flooding led to more reliance on fishing. At the time of the Domesday Book a thriving community was in place and the village appears to have been the biggest herring fishery in the district, having been assessed for 38,500 herring while Brighton had a mere 4,000. Until 1623 the steward of Southease manor recorded that the tenants were customarily given six good herrings at Lent (four if they came across the river from the manorial outlier of Heighton), as if herrings were still easily obtained in a village that is now stranded four miles from the sea.

Telscombe and Southease villages must once have been one community, with Telscombe as an outlier of the mother settlement of Southease. Telscombe peasants always shared common rights with Southease over their brooklands, and the two manors were both owned by Winchester's Hyde Abbey for nearly 600 years from Saxon times until the Reformation.

After the Dissolution of the Monasteries, the manor probably remained in possession of the king, and in 1546 one John Kerne was appointed bailiff and collector of the manors of Southease, Telscombe and Heighton. There was never a manor house in Southease as it was always owned by absentee landlords.

In the 16th century the manor passed to the Sackville family: it was held by Thomas Sackville, his widow Cicely and their grandson Robert.

==== 19th century ====
The population of the parish declined through the 19th century. The census recorded a population of 120 in 1841 with the population falling with each census to 66 in 1891. When Telscombe's open fields were enclosed in 1811 the Down pastures were left as common land and the Telscombe Tye still is.

The village was part of the Holmstrow hundred until the abolition of hundreds in the 19th century.

==== 20th century ====
During World War II four Type 24 pillboxes were built, roughly at the corners of the village, with a Type 28 pillbox just to the north. The former were for rifles and light machine guns and the latter was for a 2-pounder anti-tank gun or a 6-pounder Hotchkiss gun. There was also a Prisoner-of-war camp containing 16 Nissen huts near the northern farm, the concrete bases of which are still visible. There was also an anti-aircraft gun.

The body of the writer Virginia Woolf was found on 18 April 1941, at Asham Wharf on the east bank of the Ouse, to the north of the bridge, after her suicide by drowning on 28 March.

== Notable buildings and areas ==
Notable areas around Southease

Like Iford and Kingston, Southease is a parish of two halves. To the east is the Lewes Brooks and to the west is the South Downs. Between the two sits the Southease village with many old buildings from Soiuthease's rich history.

=== Parish Church ===
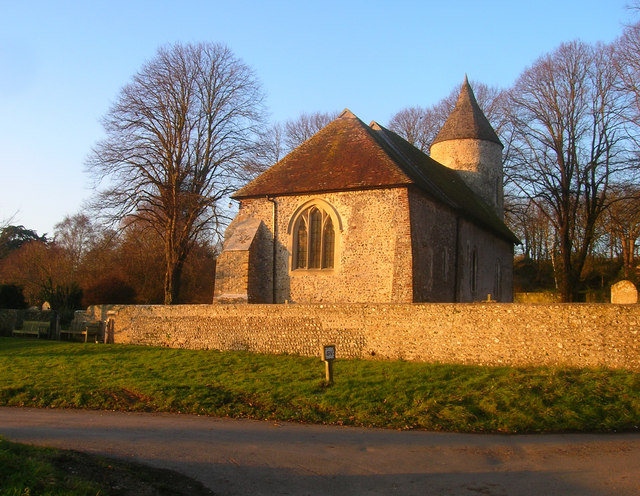
View of church from East

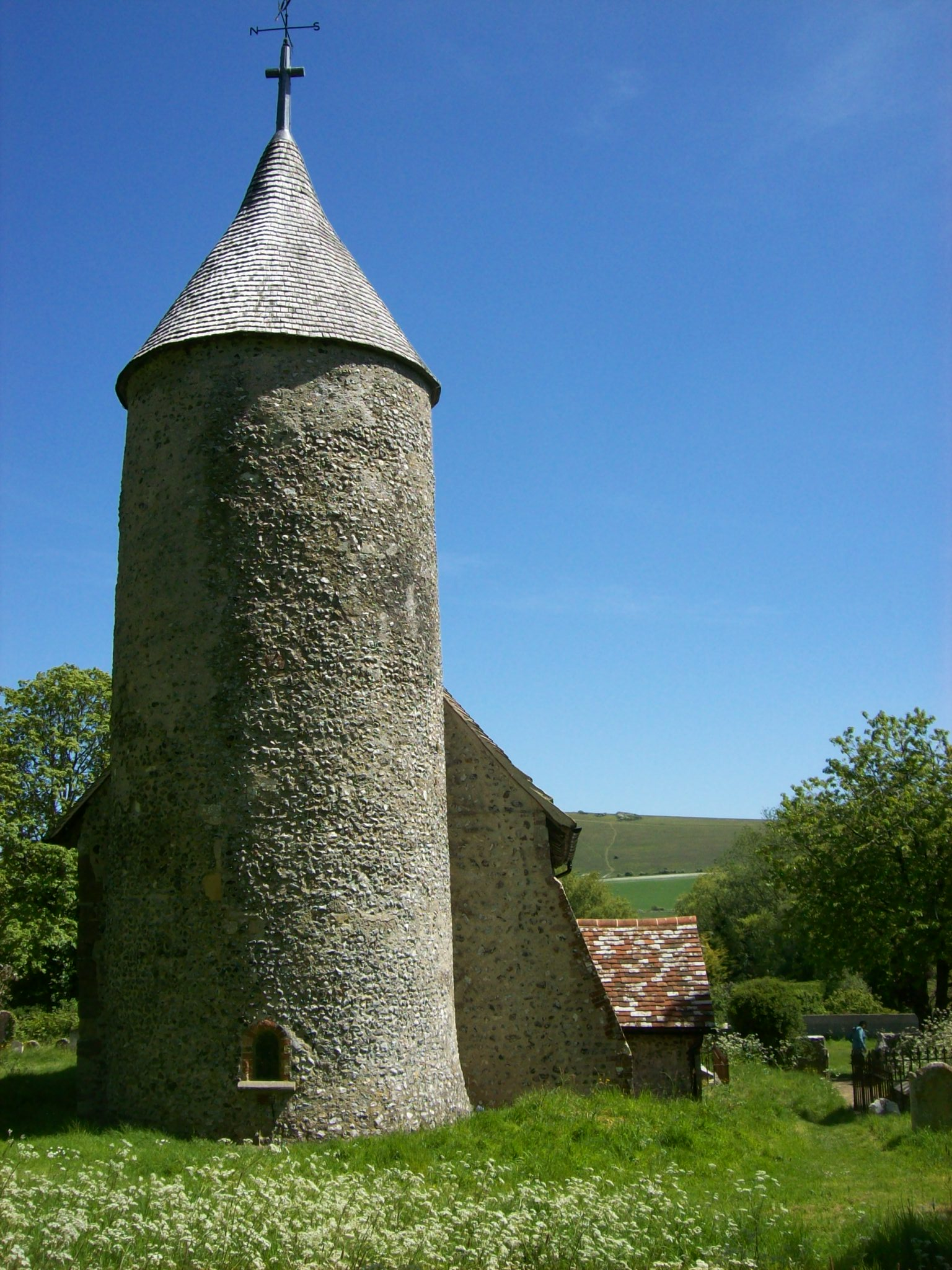
View of church from West

Exterior views of Southease Church

This is one of three churches in the Ouse valley to have a round 12th-century tower – the others are in Lewes and Piddinghoe. The chancel and nave date from the 11th century and form the nave of the original building, the chancel and transepts having been demolished in the 14th century. There are remains of mural paintings from 1280 on the north and west walls. It is a Grade I listed building. The churchyard is surrounded by mature lime trees and bounded by a flint boundary wall. The church bells were rehung in 2000.

=== Southease Listed Buildings ===
Southease has a number of listed buildings givens its grand past, which include Southease Place, Rock and Barn Cottage, Thatched Cottage, The Rectory and Black Lamb House.

Southease Place is a 17th-century two-storey house with a tiled hipped roof. The lower floor has been refaced with flints, the upper with stucco. It is a Grade II listed building.

One of the village's original farmsteads has now been made into two cottages, Rock Cottage and Barn Cottage, with the division having taken place between 1873 and 1899. Rock Cottage forms the western section of the building and Barn Cottage the eastern. Parts of Rock Cottage are 16th century, making it the oldest remaining dwellings in the village. Both are Grade II listed buildings and stand next to the old southern farmstead, which includes all the traditional 18th-century buildings. The late 18th-century threshing barn, on the southern boundary, is the dominant feature in views of the village from the South.

While the farmhouse was divided into two cottages, Thatched Cottage was once two separate cottages and has been combined into a larger one. It dates from the 18th century and has a thatched hipped roof. It is a Grade II listed building.

The Rectory is an L-shaped building with a 16th-century frame that has been stuccoed and a 19th-century addition that has also been stuccoed. A western gable bears the date 1604 and the monogram of John Rivers. It is a Grade II listed building.

Black Lamb House is an 18th-century two-storey house formerly known as "The Rest" and is also a Grade II listed building.

=== Southease Brook pastures ===
Southease brook pastures are still regularly flooded in winter, attracting wintering snipe and other wildfowl, and raptors to prey upon them. To the north of the lane to Southease Bridge, the pastures are designated as part of the Lewes Brooks SSSI (Site of Special Scientific Interest), although the ditches both there and to the south of the Bridge are heavily dominated by Reed, Phragmites australis, at the expense of the much wider range of plants and freshwater invertebrates that occurred until modern times. Wild celery, marsh dock, sea clubrush and bulrush still occur, although other special plants, like greater spearwort and golden dock appear to have been lost. Water rail can still be heard from the thick cover of the ditches, and water shrew and great silver diving beetle are present. Redshank, oystercatcher, little egret and common sandpiper can be seen along the Ouse channel banks.

=== Southease swing bridge ===
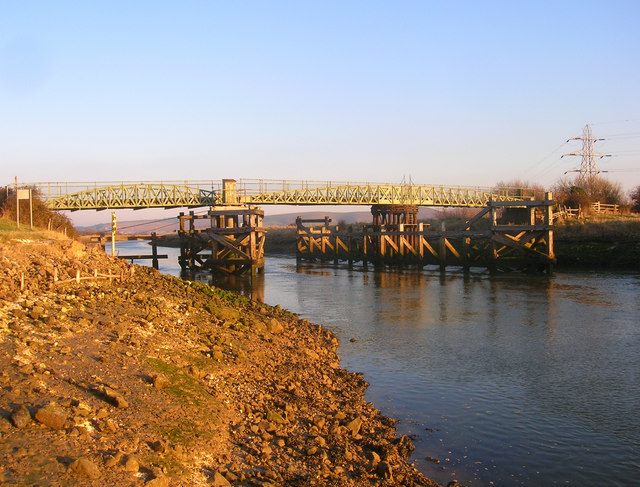
Southease Swing Bridge

Before bridges spanned the Ouse, the Stock Ferry, several hundred yards down stream of the current bridge, was the usual way of crossing. However, the Lower Ouse Improvement Act 1791 (31 Geo. 3. c. 76) required the ferry to be replaced with a bridge. The bridge had to be substantial enough to allow cattle, people and vehicles to pass over while allowing ships to pass. The original bridge was a wooden cantilever bridge slightly to the north of the current one. The wooden bridge was demolished in 1879 when it was replaced by the current one.

The current swing bridge was built in the 1880s and although the swing mechanism remains, it has not been opened since 1967. In September 2009 the bridge was granted Grade II listed building status. The bridge was closed from 8 June to 26 November 2010 and a scaffold bridge was put in place for walkers and cyclists while the original bridge structure was lifted into the adjacent Environment Agency yard, restored and then replaced. Other traffic had to take a detour for 10 kilometres (6.2 mi). The wrought iron parts of the bridge were strengthened as it had suffered corrosion and twisting of the supports. The turntable, deck and supporting timbers were replaced.

=== Southease Hill ===
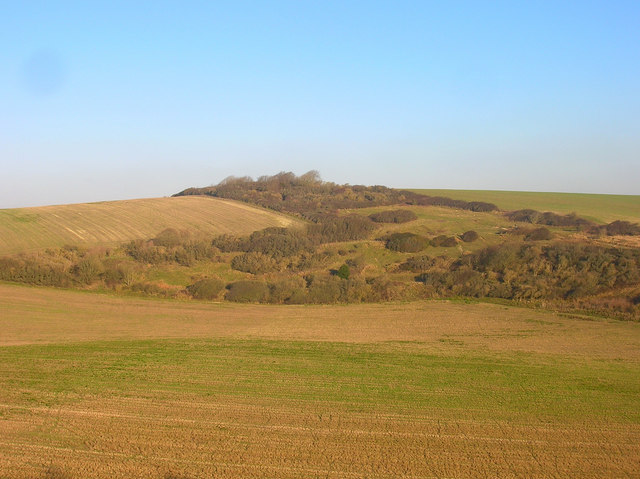
Southease Hill

To the every east of the parish on the border with Telscombe is Southease Hill. To the north, between the Southease Road and Cricketing Bottom, is a broad-backed sheep-grazed slope, with scattered gorse and thorn brakes. It is a special place for downland flora and fauna. After the war it suffered from the farmer applying agrochemicals there and it is still recovering, but you can find harebells and cowslips flowers in summer and butter waxcap fungi, Hygrocybe ceracea, in autumn and one steep part of the slope (TQ 414 047) survived the chemical peril, and the old Down pasture herbs and insects are intact in this area.

=== Hill Buildings ===
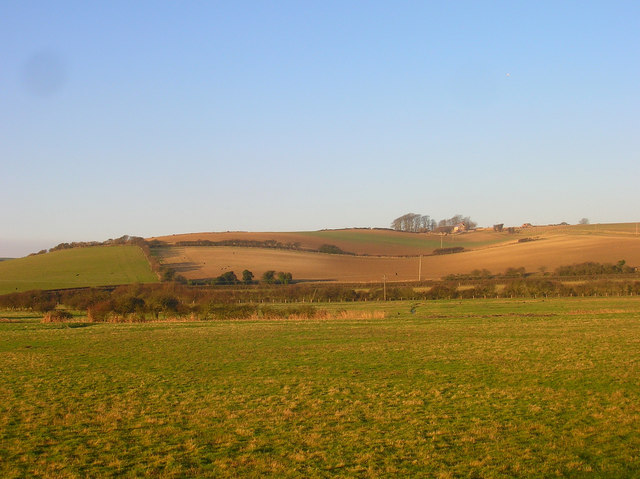
Hill Buildings from the River Ouse

Hill Buildings (TQ 420 042) was a little Victorian farm built after the enclosure of Southease in 1845. It had two gaunt cottages which were deserted for much of the late 20th century and became ruinous. New cottages have now been built, although the old flint barn and yard survive.

To the north is a bushy chalk grassland bank (TQ 420 044) with spotted orchid and cowslips, round-headed rampion and dropwort. It is grazed, which is important for the diversity of the chalk grassland plants.

=== Southease railway station ===
Southease railway station is on the Seaford branch line. Compass Travel runs the 123 bus which stops on the C7 road.

== Governance ==
On a local level, Southease parish is governed as a Parish Meeting with twice yearly meetings of the parish electorate.

The next level of government is the district council. The parish of Southease lies within the Kingston ward of Lewes District Council, which returns a single seat to the council. The election on 12 May 2015 elected a Liberal Democrat

East Sussex County Council is the next tier of government, for which Southease is within the Newhaven and Ouse Valley West division, with responsibility for Education, Libraries, Social Services, Civil Registration, Trading Standards and Transport. Elections for the County Council are held every four years. The Liberal Democrat Carla Butler was elected in the 2013 election.

The UK Parliament constituency for Southease is Lewes. The Liberal Democrat Norman Baker served as the constituency MP from 1997 until 2015, when Conservative Maria Caulfield was elected. As of July 2024 Liberal Democrat James MacCleary is the MP.

Prior to Brexit in 2020, Southease was part of the South East England constituency in the European Parliament.
