= BN postcode area =

Postcode area within the United Kingdom

Brighton
- Postcode area
- Coordinates: 50.829°N 0.112°W
- Country: United Kingdom
- Postcode area: BN
- Postcode area name: Brighton
- Post towns: 18
- Postcode districts: 37
- Postcode sectors: 143
- Postcodes (live): 21,950
- Postcodes (total): 34,887
- Statistics as at May 2020

The BN postcode area, also known as the Brighton postcode area, is a group of 30 postcode districts in South East England, within 18 post towns. These cover southwestern East Sussex (including Brighton, Hove, Eastbourne, Lewes, Hailsham, Newhaven, Peacehaven, Pevensey, Polegate and Seaford) and southeastern West Sussex (including Worthing, Littlehampton, Arundel, Hassocks, Henfield, Lancing, Shoreham-by-Sea and Steyning). The main sorting office is at the Gatwick Mail Centre in Crawley.

== Coverage ==
The approximate coverage of the postcode districts:

Postcode district	Post town	Coverage	Local authority area(s)
BN1	BRIGHTON	Brighton, Coldean, Falmer, Hollingbury, Patcham, Preston, Stanmer, Withdean	Brighton and Hove, Lewes
BN2	BRIGHTON	Brighton, Bevendean, Brighton Marina, Kemptown, Moulsecoomb, Ovingdean, Rottingdean, Saltdean, Woodingdean	Brighton and Hove, Lewes
BN3	HOVE	Hove, Aldrington, Hangleton, West Blatchington	Brighton and Hove
BN5	HENFIELD	Henfield, Blackstone, Edburton, Fulking, Small Dole, Wineham, Woodmancote	Horsham, Mid Sussex
BN6	HASSOCKS	Hassocks, Albourne, Clayton, Ditchling, Goddards Green, Hurstpierpoint, Keymer, Newtimber, Sayers Common, Streat, Westmeston	Lewes, Mid Sussex
BN7	LEWES	Lewes, Cooksbridge, East Chiltington, Iford, Kingston, Offham, Plumpton, Plumpton Green, Rodmell, Southease, Swanborough, Telscombe	Lewes
BN8	LEWES	Barcombe, Barcombe Cross, Beddingham, Chailey Green, Chiddingly, East Hoathly, Firle, Glynde, Halland, Hamsey, Holmes Hill, Laughton, Newick, North Chailey, Ringmer, Ripe, Shortgate, South Chailey, Southerham, Stoneham, Whitesmith	Lewes, Wealden
BN9	NEWHAVEN	Newhaven, Denton, Piddinghoe, South Heighton, Tarring Neville	Lewes
BN10	PEACEHAVEN	Peacehaven, Telscombe Cliffs	Lewes
BN11	WORTHING	Worthing	Worthing
BN12	WORTHING	Worthing, Ferring, Goring-by-Sea	Arun, Worthing
BN13	WORTHING	Worthing, Clapham, Durrington, High Salvington, Patching, Tarring	Arun, Worthing
BN14	WORTHING	Worthing, Broadwater, Findon, Northend, Tarring	Arun, Worthing
BN15	LANCING	Lancing, Coombes, Sompting	Adur, Worthing
BN16	LITTLEHAMPTON	Angmering, East Preston, Kingston Gorse, Rustington	Arun
BN17	LITTLEHAMPTON	Littlehampton, Climping, Lyminster, Wick	Arun
BN18	ARUNDEL	Arundel, Amberley, Binsted, Burpham, Crossbush, Fontwell, Ford, Houghton, Madehurst, Poling, Slindon, Slindon Common, South Stoke, Tortington, Walberton, Warningcamp, Wepham, Yapton	Arun, Horsham
BN20	EASTBOURNE	Eastbourne, Beachy Head, East Dean, Friston, Old Town, Ratton, Wannock, Willingdon	Eastbourne, Wealden
BN21	EASTBOURNE	Eastbourne, Old Town	Eastbourne
BN22	EASTBOURNE	Eastbourne, Hampden Park, Willingdon	Eastbourne, Wealden
BN23	EASTBOURNE	Eastbourne, Friday Street, Langney, Sovereign Harbour	Eastbourne
BN24	PEVENSEY	Pevensey, Beachlands, Hankham, Normans Bay, Pevensey Bay, Stone Cross, Westham	Wealden
BN25	SEAFORD	Seaford, Bishopstone, Cuckmere Haven, Exceat, Norton, Rookery Hill, Westdean	Lewes, Wealden
BN26	POLEGATE	Polegate, Alciston, Alfriston, Arlington, Berwick, Caneheath, Filching, Folkington, Jevington, Litlington, Lullington, Milton Street, Sayerland, Selmeston, Summerhill, Wilmington	Wealden
BN27	HAILSHAM	Hailsham, Amberstone, Bodle Street, Bodle Street Green, Boreham Street, Carters Corner, Chalvington, Cowbeech, Downash, Golden Cross, Hellingly, Herstmonceux, Horsebridge, Lower Dicker, Lower Horsebridge, Magham Down, Mulbrooks, Rickney, Trolliloes, Upper Dicker, Wartling, Windmill Hill	Wealden
BN41	BRIGHTON	Fishersgate, Portslade	Adur, Brighton and Hove
BN42	BRIGHTON	Southwick	Adur
BN43	SHOREHAM-BY-SEA	Shoreham-by-Sea	Adur
BN44	STEYNING	Steyning, Ashurst, Botolphs, Bramber, Upper Beeding, Wiston	Horsham
BN45	BRIGHTON	Poynings, Pyecombe, Saddlescombe	Mid Sussex
BN50	BRIGHTON	Brighton PO boxes	non-geographic
BN51	BRIGHTON	Rottingdean PO boxes	non-geographic
BN52	HOVE	Hove PO boxes	non-geographic
BN88	BRIGHTON	non-geographic	
BN91	WORTHING	non-geographic	
BN95	LANCING	non-geographic	
BN99	LANCING	non-geographic	

== Map ==
BN postcode area map, showing postcode districts in red and post towns in grey text, with links to nearby GU, PO, RH and TN postcode areas.

Detailed map of postcode districts and post towns in and around Brighton

== See also ==
- List of postcode areas in the United Kingdom
- Postcode Address File
