= Piddinghoe =

Village and parish in East Sussex, England

Coordinates: 50.81°N 0.03°E

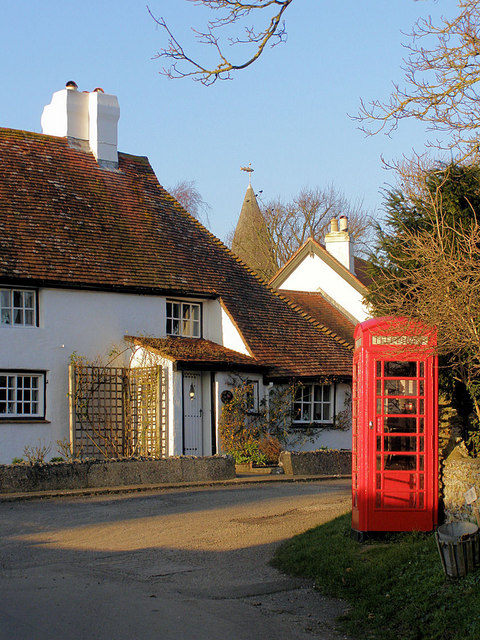
- The Old Post Office, Piddinghoe

- Location within East Sussex
- Area: 3.8 km^{2} (1.5 sq mi)
- Population: 255 (Parish-2011)
  - Density: 180/sq mi (69/km^{2})
- OS grid reference: TQ433031
  - London: 48 miles (77 km) N
- District: Lewes
- Shire county: East Sussex
- Region: South East
- Country: England
- Sovereign state: United Kingdom
- Post town: NEWHAVEN
- Postcode district: BN9
- Dialling code: 01273
- Police: Sussex
- Fire: East Sussex
- Ambulance: South East Coast
- UK Parliament: Lewes

Piddinghoe is a village and civil parish in the Lewes District of East Sussex, England. It is located in the valley of the River Ouse between Lewes and Newhaven, five miles (8 km) south of the former, downstream of Southease.

Piddinghoe is regularly visited by sailing enthusiasts as the body of water by the village is a fine location for dinghy sailing in particular but also windsurfing.

An old saying of unknown origin says that "Piddinghoe people shoe their magpies". One theory is that this refers to the habit of shoeing oxen, which if black and white, were called magpies.

== History ==
Piddinghoe does not appear in the Domesday Book of 1086, but by 1220 a manor of that name was in the hands of William de Warenne.

In the 13th century the village name appears as Peddinghowe or Pidingeho and in the 14th century as Pydynghowe. It means "hill-spur of the family or followers of a man called Pyda".

The village was part of the Holmstrow hundred until the abolition of hundreds in the 19th century.

In 1929 part of the parish on the coast was made into the parish of Peacehaven.

== Notable buildings and areas ==
Notable areas around Southease

There are a number of notable areas around Piddinghoe. From east to west it runs from River Ouse, over the Downs to Peacehaven. Due north is Southease and south is Newhaven.

=== St John's Church ===
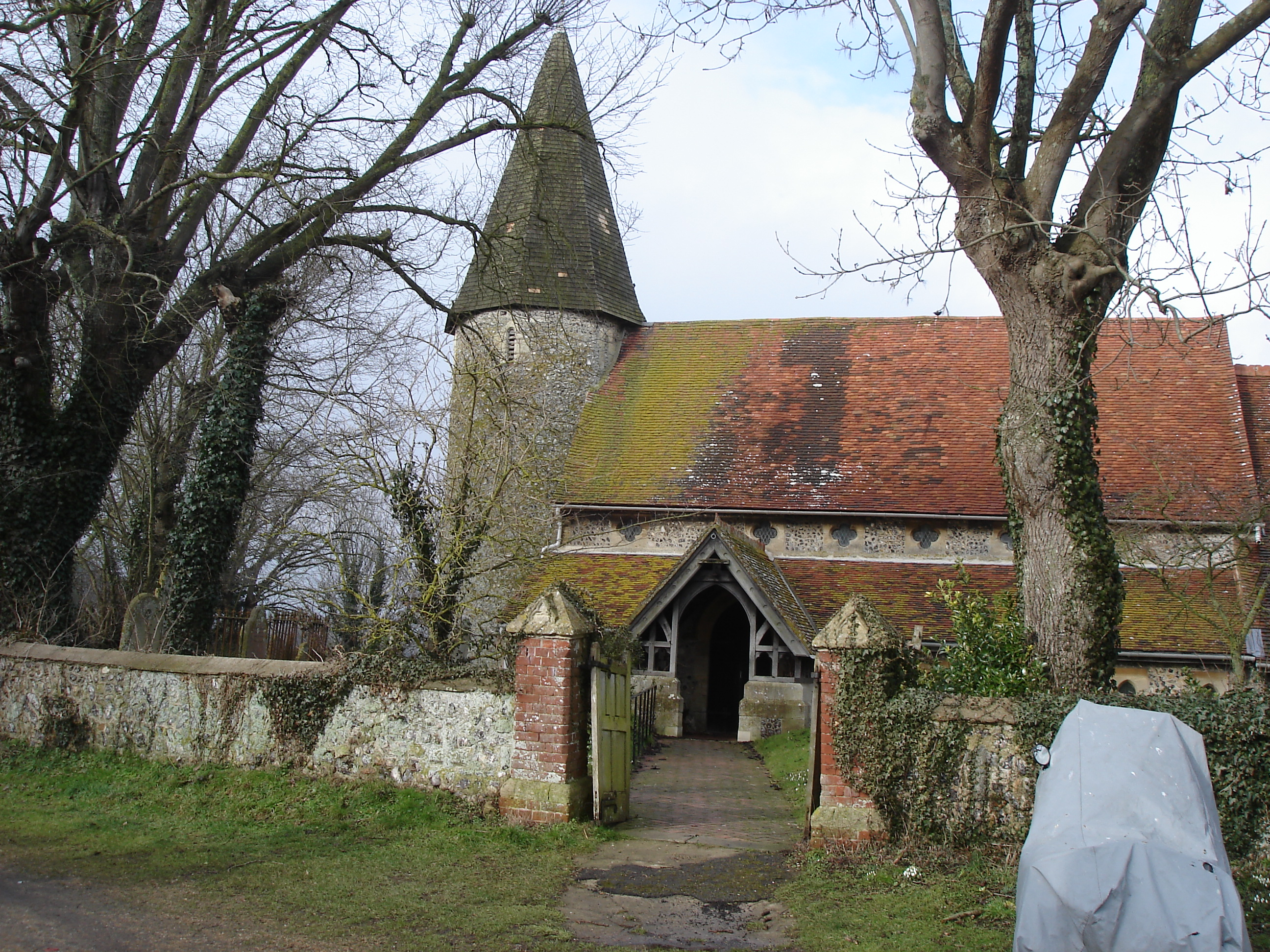
Piddinghoe church

St John's Church is one of three in the Ouse Valley with a round Norman tower, the others being at nearby Southease and St Michael’s, Lewes. It may be built upon a large prehistoric burial mound, again like Southease upstream.

=== Court Farm ===
Court Farm once farmed much of the surrounding downland; the land close to the farmstead is now a smallholding with pigs. The house is medieval and the derelict flint barns are similarly old. The little wildfowl lake was a Victorian brickfield.

=== Piddinghoe Pond ===
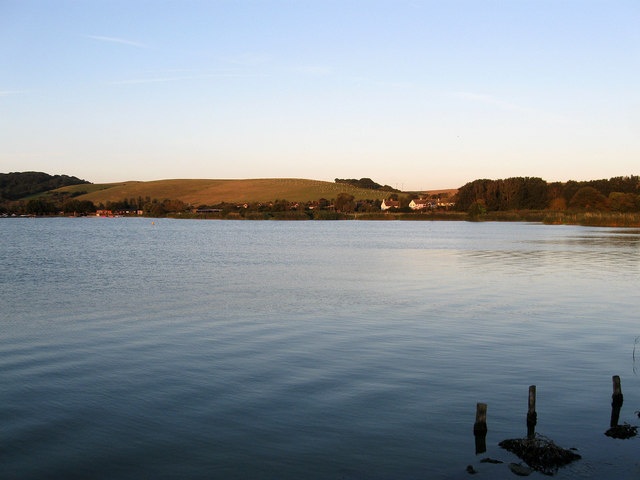
Piddinghoe Pond

Piddinghoe pond was a quarry site from the late 19th century. By the mid-1950s, excavation had stopped and the pit had filled with water. It has now been acquired by the Newhaven & Seaford Sailing Club.

=== Broadgreen Bottom ===
Despite the Downs around Piddinghoe once being almost entirely old Down pasture, now the best surviving fragment is to the north of the parish on the Southease border on the north slope of Broadgreen Bottom (TQ 420 038). The western end is scruffy and there were many rabbits until a few years ago, so you might find hound’s tongue and wild thyme and other open ground short-lived species. The eastern end of the Downslope has old Down pasture perennials, like round-headed rampion, horseshoe vetch, Devil's bit scabious and Autumn Ladies'-tresses orchid. The south slope of Broadgreen Bottom has a long Gorse bank that is used for game bird cover.

=== Money Burgh ===
The Money Burgh (TQ 424 036) is a Neolithic long barrow dominating the narrow strait of the Ouse valley. It is possible that prehistoric people crossed the estuary here as a medieval ferry crossed at Stock Cottages, nearby.

The Burgh itself is large and oval in shape. The mound is 32m by 10m (12m at the eastern end) and towards the northeast end the mound stands over 2m tall although much it is well dug over by people looking for any remaining treasure they can find. In the past a skeleton has been found in it and a number of other artefacts. The Burgh still has round-headed rampion and other old herbs upon it, although it is surrounded by the "improved" horse fields of Dean’s Farm. Next to Dean’s Farm are many game bird rearing pens and the gamekeepers’ cottages. Unfortunately, this part of the Downs is crawling with pheasant and partridge, which put major stress on native species.

=== Halcombe ===
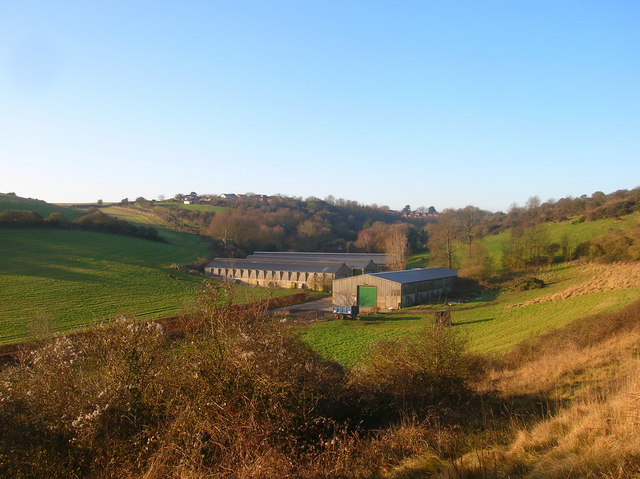
Halcombe Farm

Between north Peacehaven and Piddinghoe lies the peaceful Halcombe valley. It has chalk grassland on both its south and north slopes, and the lower valley has a finger of brook meadows, with old flint walls and reedy ditches. The south slope and the spur between Halcombe and Piddinghoe have very tall and steep medieval lynchets. The spur’s wooded slope overlooking the Newhaven Road is even steeper and is likely to be an ancient river cliff.

The south slope of Halcombe (TQ 427 031) is the best Down pasture site on the Peacehaven Downs. The variety of the place means that in some summers it can be dancing with dark green fritillary, marbled white, chalkhill blue, and many other butterflies as well as many varieties of moths, bees, and spiders. It has old anthills, mossy turf and rich scrub fringe and in spring there are early purple orchid. However the area has been threatened. In 2005 the farmer placed a large pheasant pen on these pastures. Activists were quick to inform DEFRA who instructed the farmer to remove it, although the pen is still on a part of the site. The north slope of Halcombe (TQ 423 031) has lost much of its old pasture to scrub, but the turf that remains is very rich. There is Dyer’s greenweed, round-headed rampion, squinancywort, common gromwell and hound’s tongue. The site is at risk from scrub encroachment although some chalkhill blue are still present in high summer.

=== Nore Down ===
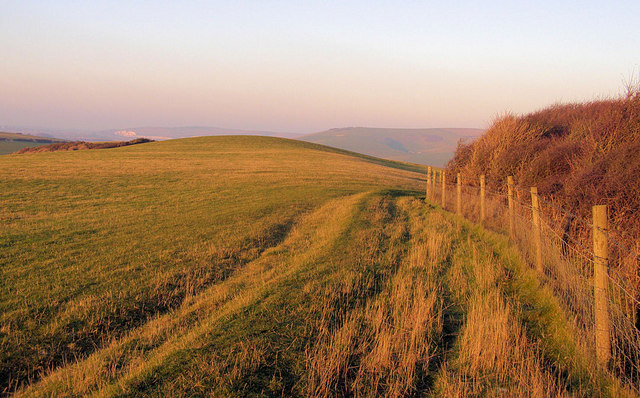
Nore Down

Nore Down (TQ 431 023) has a rumpled top that marks the presence of the Tertiary sands and clays underneath. On its west flank there are large medieval lynchets, but the valley, like much of the downland in this area, has been turned over to game shooting, and there is cover crops and a giant rearing pen covering part of once chalk grassland slope.

== Governance ==
At a local level Piddinghoe is governed by Piddinghoe Parish Council. Their responsibilities include footpaths, street lighting, playgrounds and minor planning applications. The parish council had five seats available in 2007 four were filled in the uncontested May 2007 election.

The next level of government is the district council. The parish of Piddinghoe lies within the Kingston ward of Lewes District Council, which returns a single seat to the council. The election on 4 May 2023 returned a Liberal Democrat

East Sussex County Council is the next tier of government, for which Piddinghoe is within the Newhaven and Ouse Valley West division, with responsibility for education, libraries, social services, civil registration, trading standards and transport. elections for the county council are held every four years. The Liberal Democrat Sarah Osborne was elected in the 2021 election.

The UK Parliament constituency for Piddinghoe is Lewes. Conservative Tim Rathbone represented the constituency from 1973 until the Liberal Democrat Norman Baker became the constituency MP from 1997 until 2015, when Conservative Maria Caulfield was elected. As of July 2024, Liberal Democrat James MacCleary is the MP.

Prior to Brexit in 2020, the village was part of the South East England constituency in the European Parliament.
