= Younsmere Hundred =

Former administrative division in Sussex, England

Younsmere Hundred was an administrative unit in the Rape of Lewes in the eastern division of the county of Sussex, England until the abolition of hundreds in the 19th century. The Rape was a county sub-division peculiar to Sussex. For most of the Younsmere hundred's existence it included the parishes of Rottingdean (including the detached Balsdean chapelry), Ovingdean and Falmer (including Balmer), i.e. the parishes covering a block of downland east of Brighton.

Part of this territory was, at the Domesday survey, in Falmer hundred and part in Welesmere hundred. We can assume therefore that Younsmere hundred was created between 1086 and 1248, the date at which it appears as Iwonesmere in an unpublished Assize Roll. It also appears as Hywelesmere in the Assize Roll of the same year. The second spelling is evidently a confused recollection of the fact that Rottingdean and Ovingdean were previously in Welesmere hundred.

Stanmer, near Falmer, is sometimes said to have been in Younsmere hundred, but apparently only on the grounds that it had been in Falmer hundred at the time of Domesday. Thereafter, however, Stanmer was a geographical anomaly: it was in Ringmer hundred in the Rape of Pevensey.

The origin of the name is contested, but it may mean 'pool of [a male person called in Old English] Gefwine'. Possible alternatives are discussed in Coates (2010). The following spellings are on record from the thirteenth to the nineteenth century: Yenesmere (13th); Iwonesmere (13th-14th); Yonesmere (13th-17th); Jonesmere (15th); Yoensmere al[ias] Ewensmere (16th-17th); Yewnesmere (17th); Hanns OR Hunns Mere Pit, Hound's Mare Pet, Youngsmere (19th).

The pool was presumably the meeting-place of the hundred, though it had ceased to be so long before the end of the hundredal system, according to Dudeney (1849), who knew the Downs intimately. He said it was near the mutual boundary of Rottingdean, Balsdean and Ovingdean, and its faint trace was still visible in 1995, near the top of the ridge south of Cowley Drive in the modern suburb of Woodingdean. A later record suggests that the hundred might have met at a pit of this name in Falmer parish, but that cannot be reconciled with Dudeney's authoritative statement.

== Sources and references ==
- Coates, Richard (2010) A place-name history of Rottingdean and Ovingdean. Nottingham: English Place-Name Society.
- Dudeney, John (1849) Some passages in the life of John Dudeney of Lewes, schoolmaster, but formerly a shepherd, written by himself. 1849. MS. in two fair copies and a rough one, East Sussex Record Office MS. ACC 3785/3 and /4. [Much of this autobiography was published by Blencowe, R.W. (1849). "South-Down shepherds, and their songs at the sheepshearings". Sussex Archaeological Collections. 2 247-56 [at 253-6]. doi:10.5284/1085075.]
- Hudson, W.H., ed. (1910) The three earliest subsidies for the county of Sussex. Lewes: Sussex Record Society (vol. 10).
- Mawer, A., and F.M. Stenton (1930) The place-names of Sussex, vol. 2. Cambridge: Cambridge University Press (Survey of English Place-Names 7), pp. 307-8.
- 'The hundred of Younsmere', A history of the county of Sussex: volume 7: The rape of Lewes (1940), pp. 221-22, the Victoria County History. Date accessed: 14 May 2007.
