= St Peter's Church, Rodmell =

Coordinates: 50.838669°N 0.017850°E

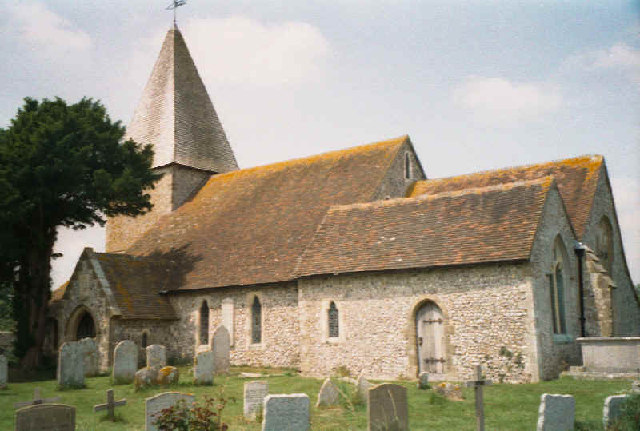

- Location in East Sussex
- OS grid reference: TQ 42169 06268
- Location: Rodmell, Lewes
- Country: England
- Denomination: Anglican
- Website: https://www.achurchnearyou.com/church/5114/

History
- Status: Parish church
- Dedication: Saint Peter
- Consecrated: 12th century

Architecture
- Functional status: Active
- Architectural type: Church
- Style: Norman

Specifications
- Materials: Stone, slate roofs

Administration
- Diocese: Chichester
- Deanery: Lewes and Seaford
- Parish: Rodmell

Listed Building – Grade I
- Official name: The Parish Church of St Peter
- Designated: 20 August 1965
- Reference no.: 1238975

St Peter's Church is the parish church of Rodmell, East Sussex, England, and dates from the 12th century. It is a Grade I listed building and is among the earliest surviving examples of Norman architecture in the country.

== Gallery ==
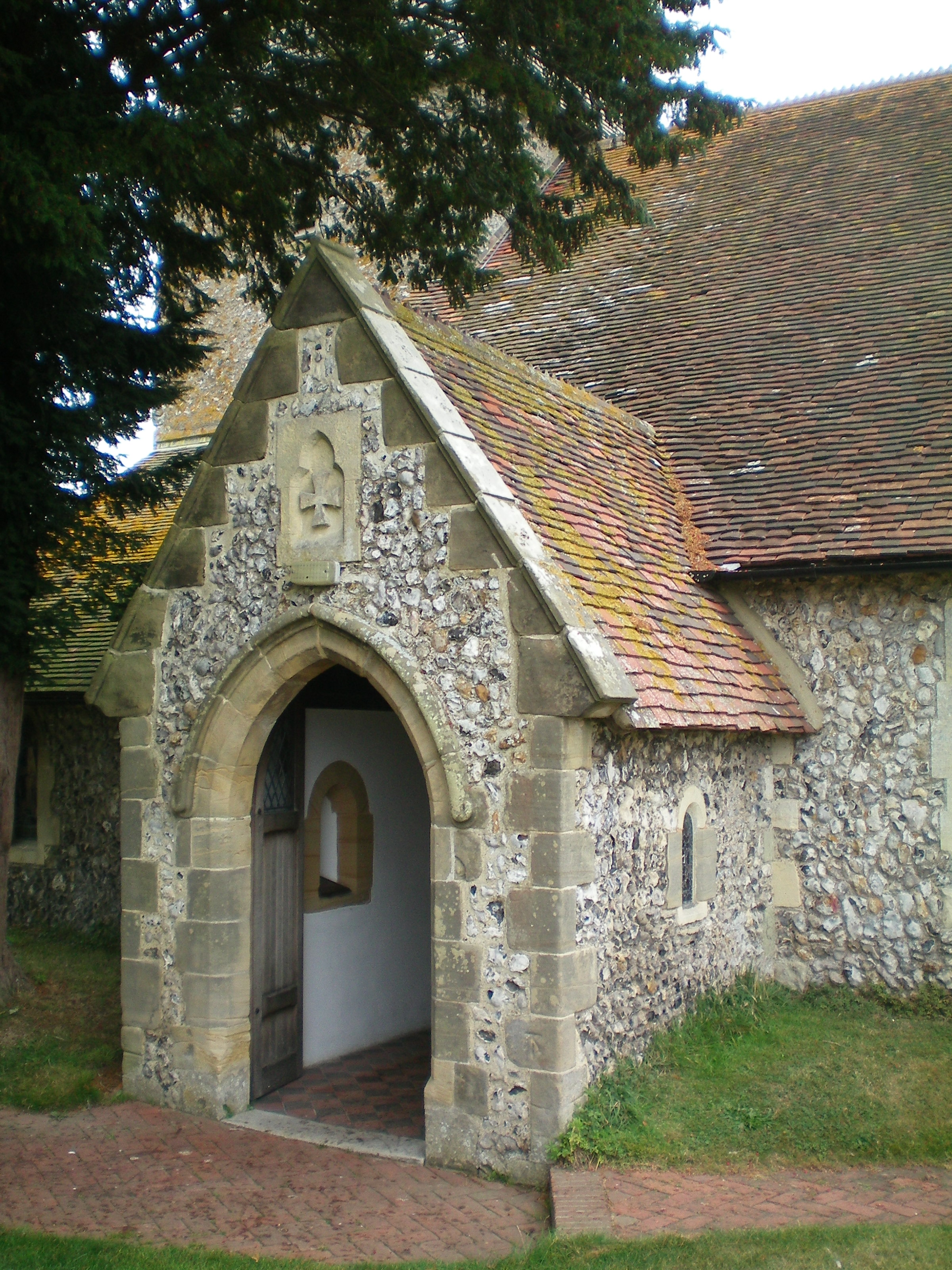
The porch

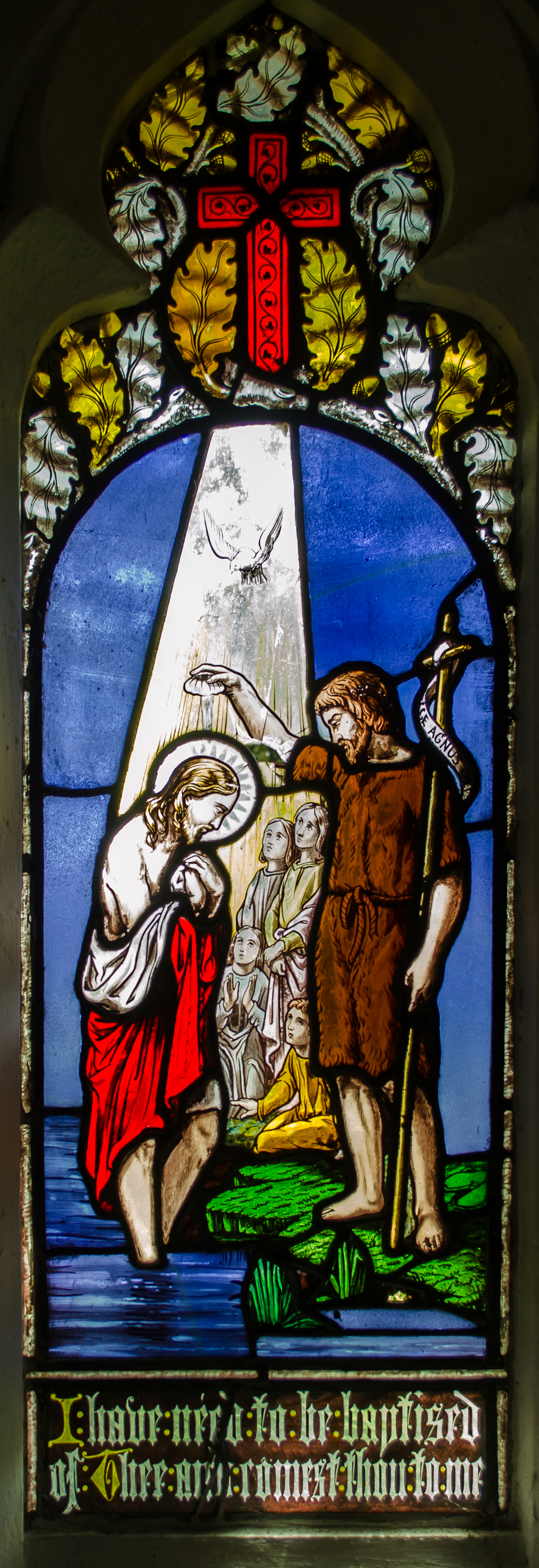
Stained glass window by James Powell and Sons depicting John the Baptist

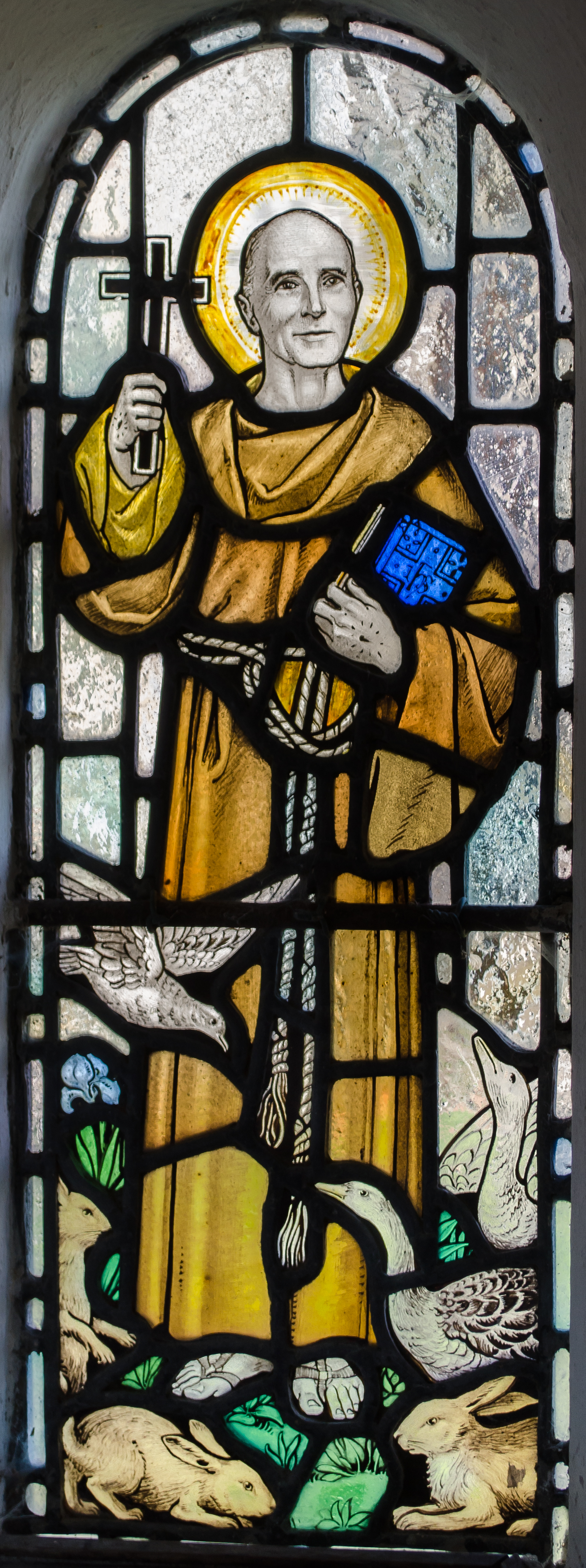
St Francis: stained glass in the porch

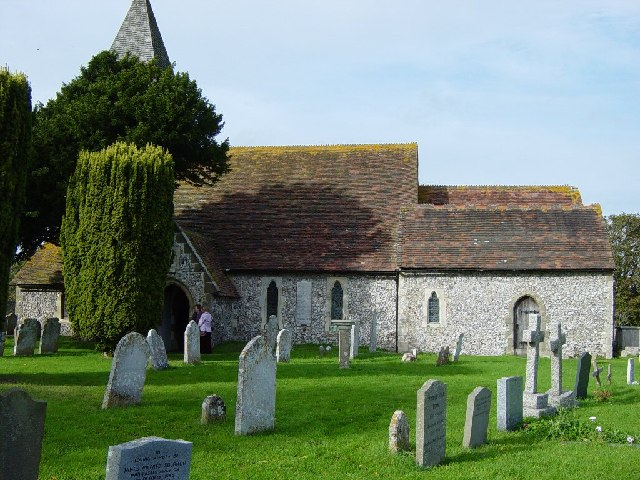
St Peter's graveyard

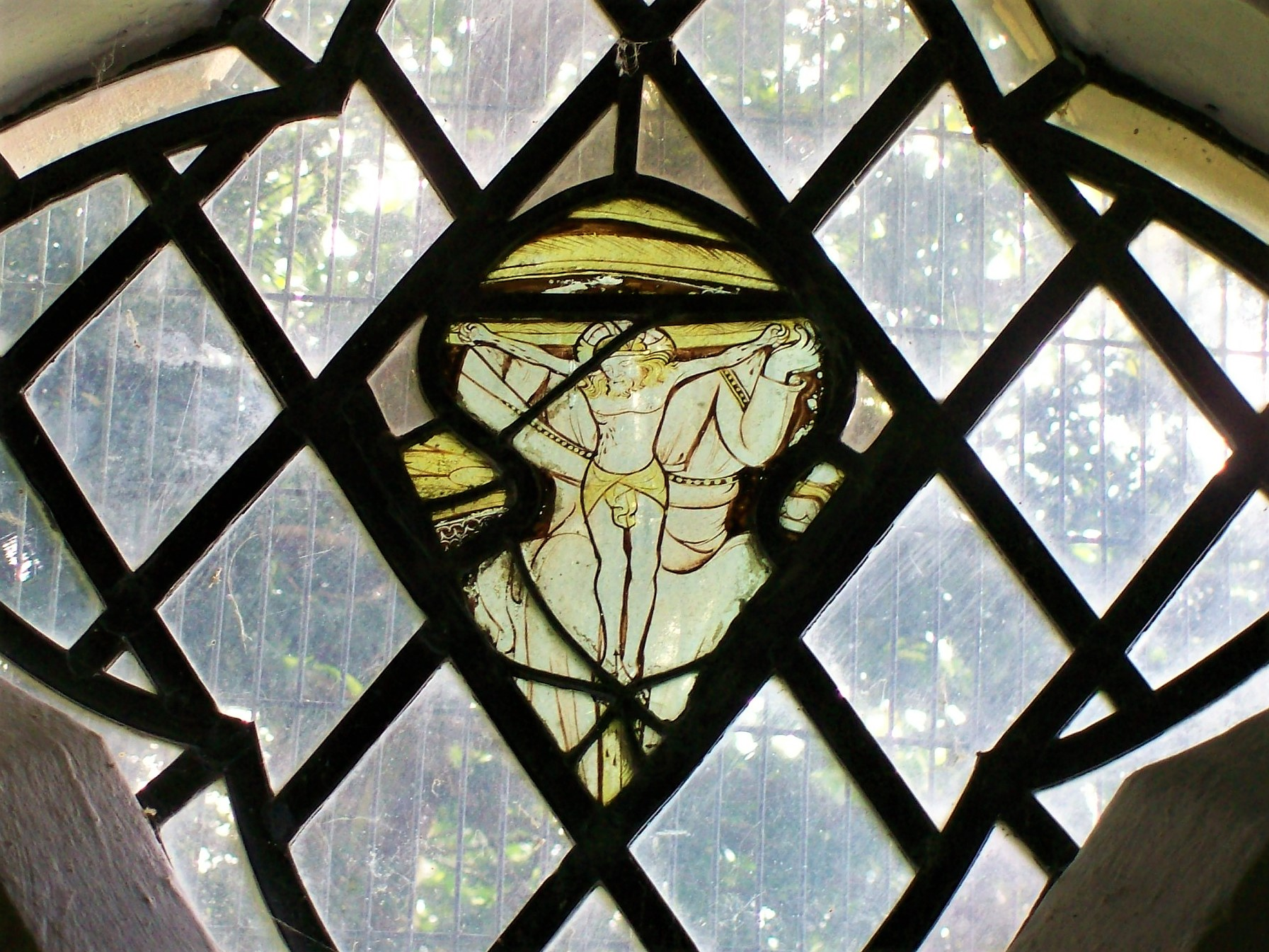
Medieval glass fragment in the church

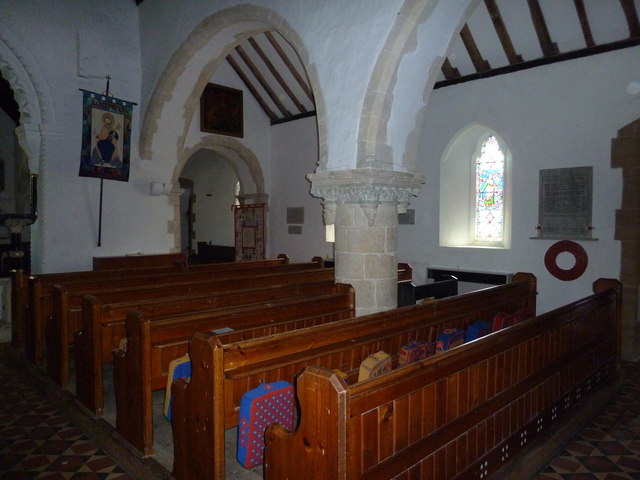
Nave and one aisle of the hall church
