= Holmstrow (hundred) =

Former administrative area of Sussex, England

- Map showing location of Holmstrow hundred in Sussex.
- Area
  - 1831: 6,710 acres (27 km^{2})
- Population
  - 1831: 1,748
- History
  - Created: in antiquity
  - Abolished: 1884 - 1965,
- Status: obsolete
- Government: hundred
- Subdivisions
  - Type: Parishes
  - Units: Newhaven, Piddinghoe, Rodmell, Southease, Telscombe.

Holmstrow Hundred was an administrative unit in the Rape of Lewes in the eastern division of the county of Sussex, until the disuse of hundreds for anything other than census statistics in the 19th century. It contained the villages of Meeching (now Newhaven), Piddinghoe, Telscombe, Southease and Rodmell. The hundreds of England were never formally and comprehensively abolished by a single Act of Parliament; instead, they slowly fell into disuse as their judicial, military, and administrative powers were stripped away over several centuries.
