= Rape of Lewes =

Traditional geographic subdivision in Sussex, England

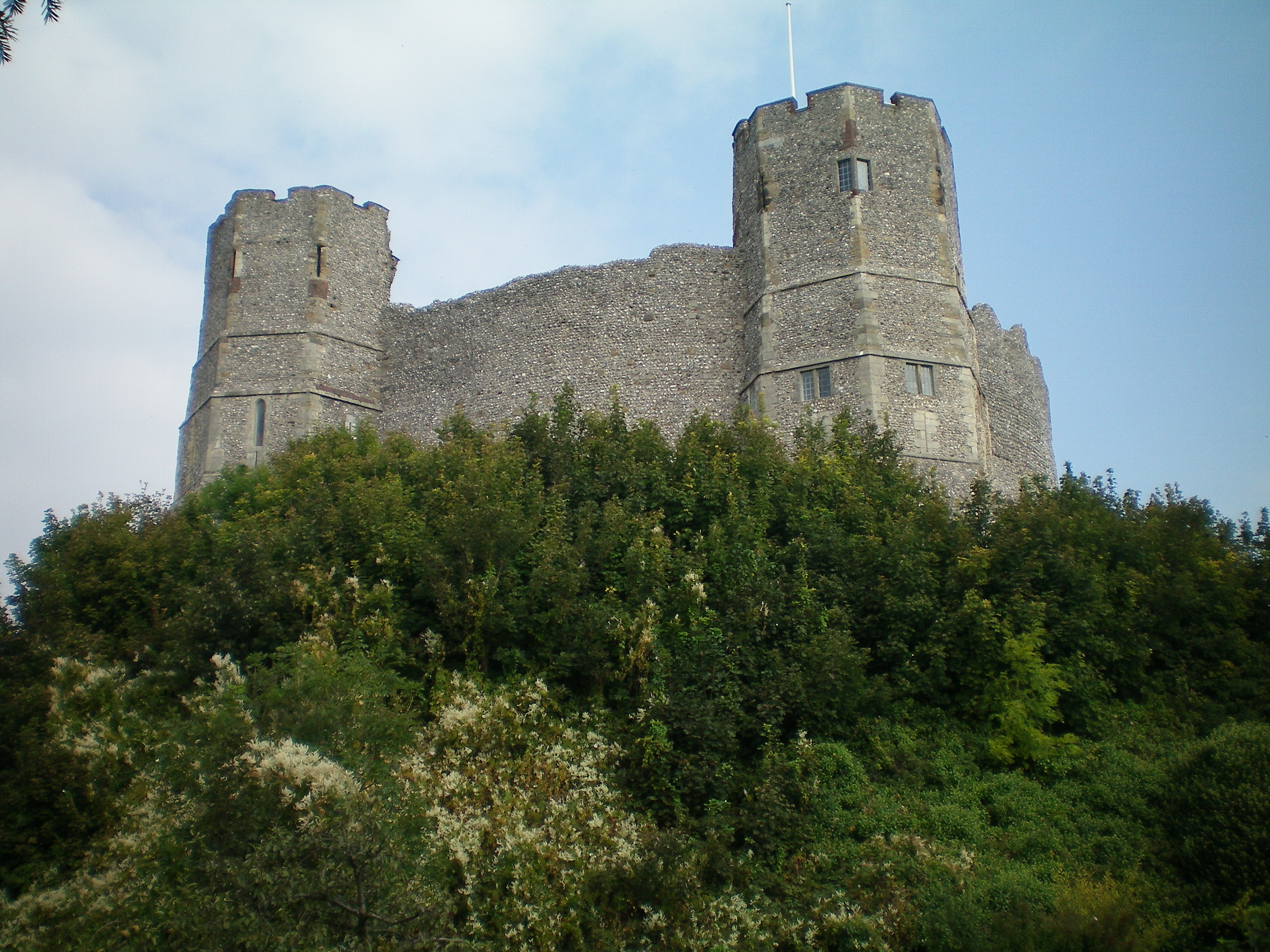
- The keep of Lewes Castle, once the administrative centre of the Rape

- The Rape of Lewes shown within Sussex
- Area
  - 1831: 129,580 acres (524.4 km^{2})
- Population
  - 1821: 53,085
  - 1831: 71,921
- Density
  - 1821: 0.41 inhabitants per acre (100/km^{2})
  - 1831: 0.56 inhabitants per acre (140/km^{2})
- History
  - Created: 6th to 11th century
  - Succeeded by: Sussex (eastern division)
- Status: Rape (county subdivision)
  - HQ: Lewes
- Subdivisions
  - Type: Hundreds
  - Units: Barcombe, Buttinghill, Dean, Fishersgate (half hundred), Holmstrow, Poynings, Preston, Streat, Swanborough, Whalebourne, Younsmere

The Rape of Lewes (also known as Lewes Rape) is one of the rapes, the traditional sub-divisions unique to the historic county of Sussex in England.

== Location ==
The rape of Bramber lies to its west and the rape of Pevensey lies to its east. The north of the rape is bounded by the county of Surrey and to the south by the English Channel. The rape of Lewes includes the city of Brighton and Hove in its south-west corner, as well as the towns of Burgess Hill, Haywards Heath, Lewes, Newhaven and Seaford. At 248 metres (814 ft) tall, its highest point is Ditchling Beacon on the South Downs.

== History ==
According to John Morris the boundary between the Rapes of Lewes and Pevensey, which cuts through the middle of Lewes, probably predates the founding of the town of Lewes in the late 9th or early 10th century. If one boundary had existed so early then it is quite possible that other boundaries also existed, and the Rape of Lewes, or its precursor, would have existed at this time. Ditchling is likely to have been a primary regional centre for a large part of central Sussex between the Rivers Adur and Ouse until the founding of Lewes in the 9th century. Another possibility is that the rapes derive from the system of fortifications, or burhs (boroughs) devised by Alfred the Great in the late ninth century to defeat the Vikings. The Rapes, or similar predecessors could have been marked out to serve the purpose of maintaining these early boroughs, which included Lewes.

At the time of the Norman Conquest in 1066, the Rape of Lewes seems to have included the land between the Rivers Adur and Ouse and would have been given to William de Warenne. By the time of the Domesday Survey was made in 1086 a large strip of land extending to the River Adur on the west, and running from north to south, seems to have been cut off from Warenne's territory and given to William de Braose as part of his rape of Bramber. Another piece of land in the northeast of the original rape of Lewes, the hundred of East Grinstead, was given to Robert, Count of Mortain. William de Warenne was compensated for these land losses by a grant of manors in Norfolk, Suffolk, and Essex, which are described in Domesday Book as 'of the exchange of Lewes' or 'of the castellany of Lewes' and in the time of Henry II as the Earl of Warenne's 'new land'.

== Sub-divisions ==
The rape is traditionally divided into the following hundreds:

- Barcombe
- Buttinghill
- Dean
- Fishersgate
- Holmstrow
- Poynings
- Preston
- Streat
- Swanborough
- Whalebourne
- Younsmere

== See also ==
- History of Sussex
- List of hundreds of England and Wales

== Bibliography ==
- Allen, Thomas (1829). A History of the Counties of Surrey and Sussex.
