= Telscombe =

Town and civil parish in East Sussex, England

Coordinates: 50.803°N 0.01°W

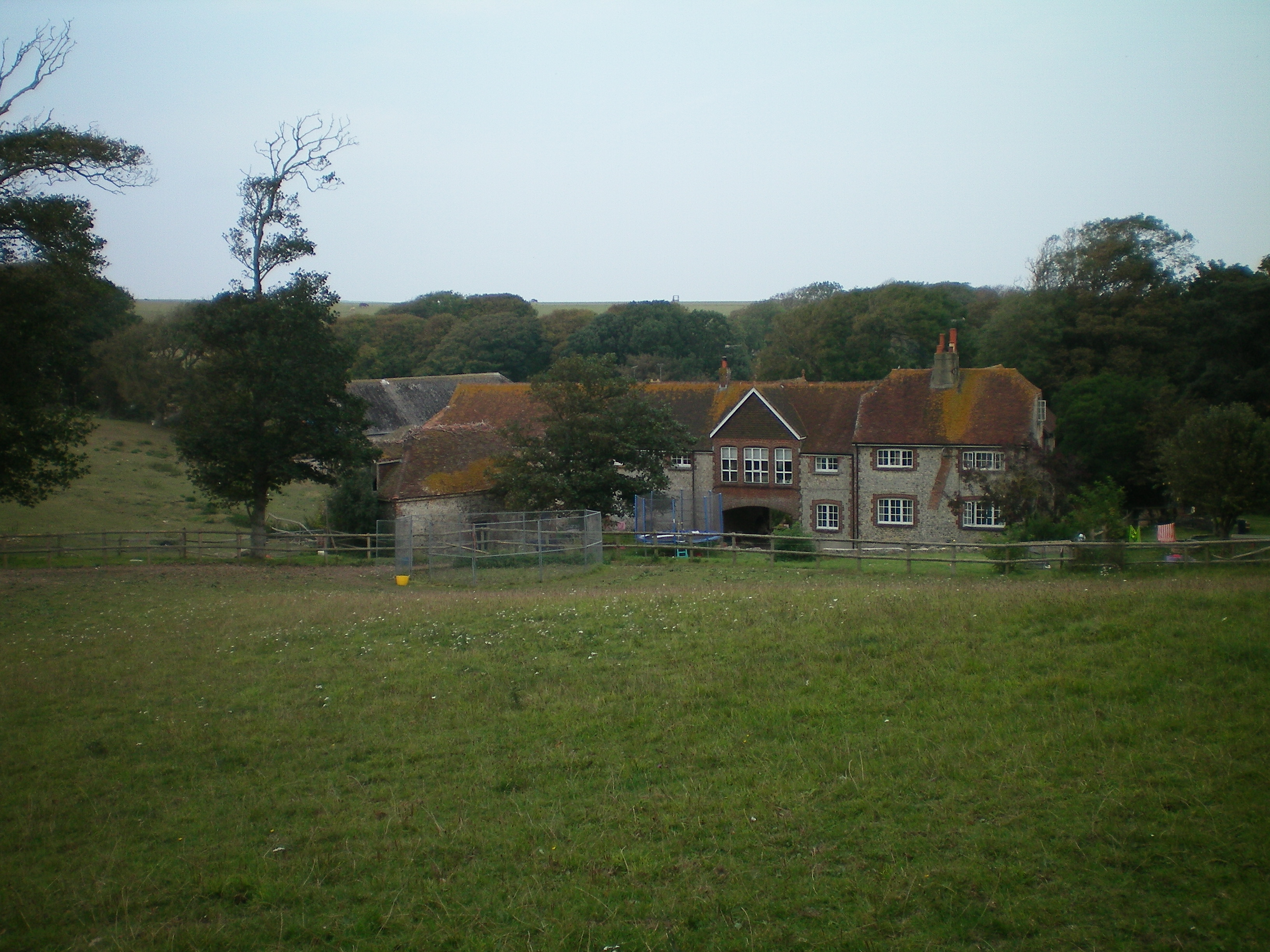
- Telscombe Farm

- Location within East Sussex
- Area: 4.7 km^{2} (1.8 sq mi)
- Population: 7,477 (2011)
  - Density: 3,868/sq mi (1,493/km^{2})
- OS grid reference: TQ403022
  - London: 48 miles (77 km) N
- District: Lewes
- Shire county: East Sussex
- Region: South East
- Country: England
- Sovereign state: United Kingdom
- Post town: PEACEHAVEN
- Postcode district: BN10
- Post town: BRIGHTON
- Postcode district: BN2
- Post town: LEWES
- Postcode district: BN7
- Dialling code: 01273
- Police: Sussex
- Fire: East Sussex
- Ambulance: South East Coast
- UK Parliament: Brighton Kemptown
- Website: Town council web site

Telscombe is a town and civil parish in the Lewes District of East Sussex, England. It consists of three distinct settlements, separated from each other by an open area of downland called Telscombe Tye.

Telscombe village is a small village on the South Downs, six miles (10 km) south of Lewes. It includes the parish church, with origins dating back to the 10th century. The village has a population of fewer than 50 people.

The parish retains its ancient boundaries, which reach from the village to the coast, and the major part of the population is in the two coastal settlements. At the eastern end of the parish, about 4500 people live at Telscombe Cliffs, developed in the 20th century effectively as an extension of the town of Peacehaven over the town boundary. At the western end, the remaining 2500 population forms part of the community of Saltdean, the remainder of Saltdean being within the city of Brighton and Hove.

In 1929, thanks to the growth in population, Telscombe gained a parish council: in 1974 it became a town, with a mayor. The new civic centre in Telscombe Cliffs came into use in 2000.

The Prime Meridian crosses the northeast corner of Telscombe parish. The town has a school, Telscombe Cliffs Primary.

The parish includes part of the Brighton to Newhaven Cliffs Site of Special Scientific Interest. The cliffs are mainly of geological interest, containing many Santonian and Campanian fossils. The SSSI listing includes flora and fauna biological interest too.

== History ==
The name Telscombe derives from the Old English titelscumb meaning 'Titel's combe'.

The manor of Telscombe is recorded as early as the 10th century, when it was given by King Edgar to the minster of Hyde, and remained in those hands until the dissolution in 1538. The manor and village passed through many hands in the following centuries; in 1900 James Andrew Harman became Lord of the Manor, and in 1924 it was acquired by Charles Willam Neville (born Charles William Neville Ussher in 1881), the developer who had founded Peacehaven in 1916. The village was part of the Holmstrow hundred until the abolition of hundreds in the 19th century.

== Telscombe Village ==
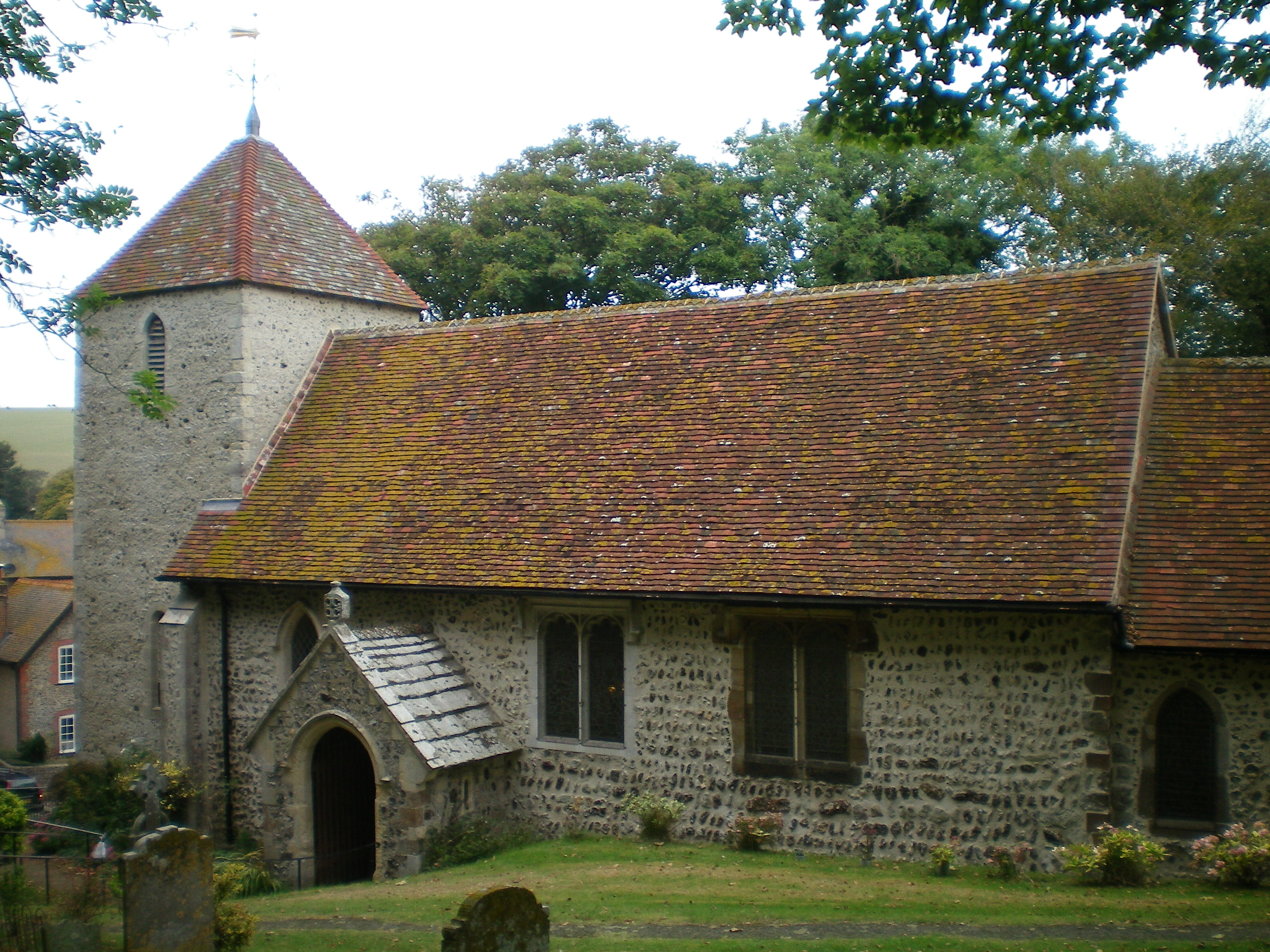
St. Laurence's Church

Although the ancient village of Telscombe is located less than two miles (3 km) from the coast, there is no public road linking the village with the coastal part of the parish. The byway was closed to all traffic in 2015. The village is found at the end of a winding dead end road leaving the Lewes—Newhaven road at Southease.

Telscombe is a small cluster of buildings around a church dedicated to St Laurence. It is a 10th-century foundation with a 13th-century font, largely rebuilt and decorated in the 20th century.

The manor house was for many years used as Judge's Lodgings, occupied when High Court judges were sitting at Lewes Crown Court. This practice was controversial because of the costs of providing and maintaining this accommodation, including the employment of butlers and other staff, and was phased out by the Labour government from 2001. The cost of the Telscombe lodgings was put at £147,893.

== Telscombe Tye ==
Telscombe Tye is an area of open land with the status of common, extending from Telscombe village to the coast. The Tye forms a natural break between the settlements of Saltdean and Telscombe Cliffs/Peacehaven, and marks the eastern end of a continuously built up area (Greater Brighton) from Shoreham in West Sussex. The Tye is contained within the South Downs National Park, and is one of the few places where the park boundary reaches the seafront.

As designated common, the land was unenclosed and on a map dated 1811 is shown as "Sheep Down" on which local stockholders had grazing rights. One such landowner in the early 20th century was Ambrose Gorham. He managed a stud farm and trained racehorses, including the 1902 winner of the Grand National. On his death in 1933 he bequeathed his property in the village in trust to be administered by the Brighton Corporation, stating in the trust deed:

The object and purpose of the Charity with respect to the Telscombe property is that the said

property may continue to be preserved with its present rural characteristics in order that the public and especially the inhabitants of Telscombe Piddinghoe and Brighton may have recourse thereto for quiet and peaceful recreation and meditation and the management of the Telscombe property shall be so conducted as best to further this object but so that the leasing of the land for agricultural or

pastoral purposes on the terms hereinafter authorised shall not be precluded...

At this time Neville, the developer of Peacehaven owned the Tye itself, while the trustees of Gorham's Gift owned the rights of common: a situation which led to frequent disputes. In January 1979 the land was registered as common under the Commons Registration Act, and in 1989 the Tye was put up for auction by the Neville family (Charles Neville had died in 1960) and purchased by Telscombe Town Council.

== Governance ==
Telscombe Town Council consists of 13 elected councillors, five representing East Saltdean and eight from Telscombe Cliffs. Elections are held every four years and, as in neighbouring Peacehaven town council, are contested by candidates of the main political parties. The town is represented by three councillors on Lewes District Council; the May 2023 local elections returned three Labour Party councillors for the ward.

Telscombe and Peacehaven jointly form the Peacehaven & Telscombe Towns electoral division which elects two councillors to the East Sussex county council.

Telscombe is in the Brighton Kemptown constituency for the UK Parliament.

In July 2025 a consultation was launched over proposals to bring East Saltdean, Telscombe Cliffs, and Peacehaven into Brighton and Hove.
