= Rape of Pevensey =

Traditional geographic subdivision in Sussex, England

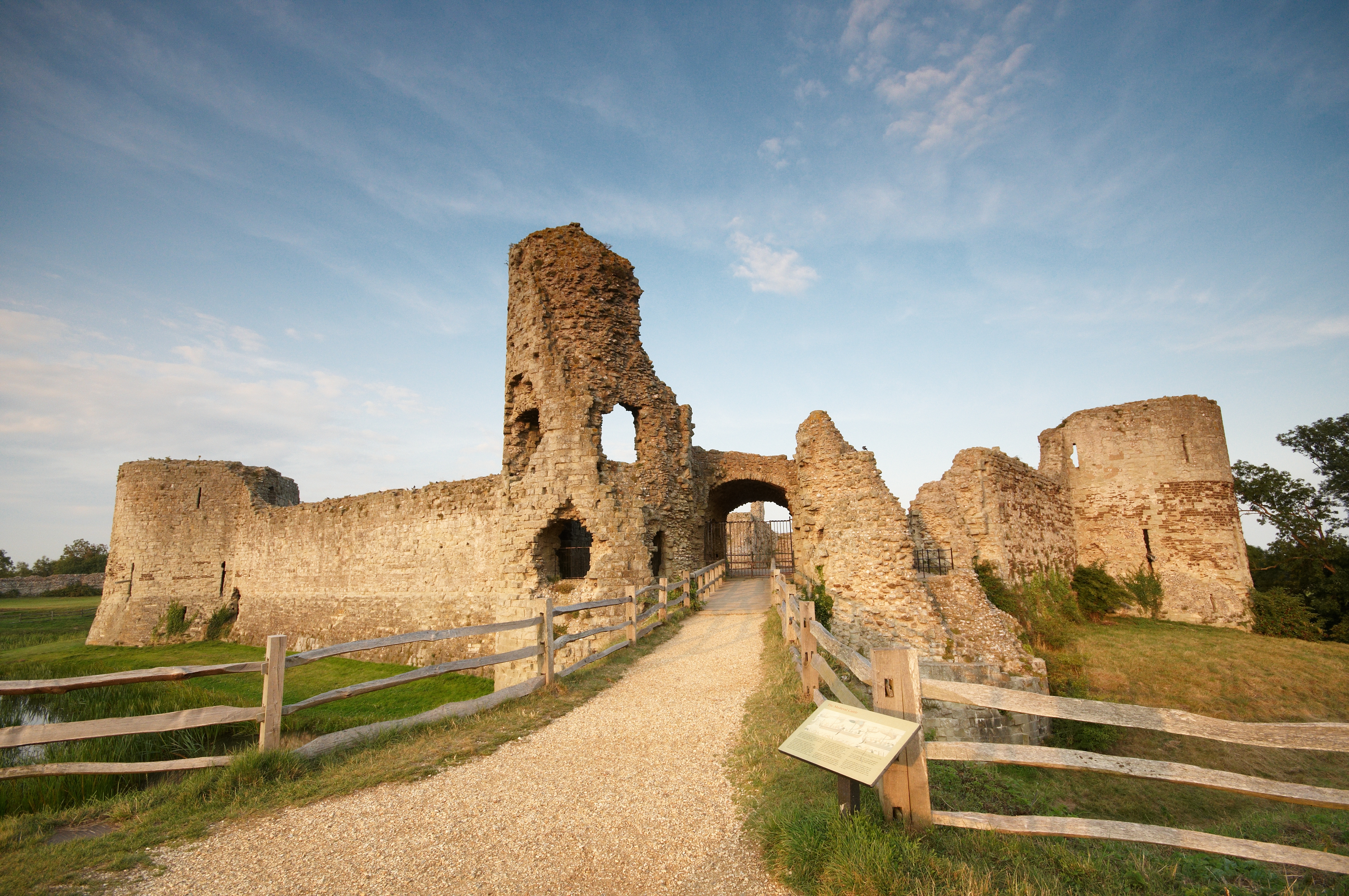
- The keep of Pevensey Castle, once the administrative centre of the Rape

- The Rape of Pevensey shown within Sussex
- Area
  - 1821: 228,930 acres (926.4 km^{2})
  - 1831: 228,930 acres (926.4 km^{2})
- Population
  - 1821: 44,830
  - 1831: 49,776
- Density
  - 1821: 0.20 inhabitants per acre (49/km^{2})
  - 1831: 0.22 inhabitants per acre (54/km^{2})
- History
  - Created: 6th to 11th century
  - Succeeded by: Sussex (eastern division)
- Status: Rape (county subdivision)
  - HQ: Pevensey
- Subdivisions
  - Type: Hundreds
  - Units: Alciston, Bishopstone, Burleigh Arches, Danehill, Horsted, Dill, East Grinstead, Eastbourne, Flexborough, Hartfield, Longbridge, Loxfield Dorset, Loxfield Pelham, Pevensey Lowey, Ringmer, Rotherfield, Rushmonden, Shiplake, Totnore, Willingdon

The Rape of Pevensey (also known as Pevensey Rape) is one of the rapes, the traditional sub-divisions unique to the historic county of Sussex in England. With an area of 228,930 acres (926.4 km^{2}) it is the largest of the Sussex rapes.

== History ==
William the Conqueror granted Pevensey Castle and the rape of Pevensey to his half-brother Robert, Count of Mortain shortly after the Norman Conquest. The Count of Mortain supported Robert Curthose in his rebellion against Henry I of England, leading to Henry I re-granting the rape to Norman lord Gilbert Laigle.

== Location ==
Pevensey rape lies between the rape of Lewes to the west and the rape of Hastings to the east. The north-west of the rape is bounded by the county of Surrey and the north-east of the rape by the county of Kent. To the south lies the English Channel. The rape of Pevensey includes the towns of Crowborough, Eastbourne and East Grinstead. At 242 metres (794 ft) tall, Crowborough Beacon in the High Weald is the highest point in the rape.

From the Middle Ages, Stanmer in the Rape of Lewes was a southwestern exclave (forming a detached part) of the Rape of Pevensey, which is otherwise east of the Ouse.

== Sub-divisions ==
The rape is traditionally divided into the following hundreds:

- Alciston
- Bishopstone
- Burleigh Arches
- Danehill Horsted
- Dill
- East Grinstead
- Eastbourne
- Flexborough
- Hartfield
- Longbridge
- Loxfield Dorset
- Loxfield Pelham
- Pevensey Lowey
- Ringmer
- Rotherfield
- Rushmonden
- Shiplake
- Totnore
- Willingdon

== See also ==
- History of Sussex
- List of hundreds of England and Wales
