= Lewes District =

Coordinates: 50°52′26″N 0°00′32″E

- Non-metropolitan district
- Lewes shown within East Sussex
- Sovereign state: United Kingdom
- Constituent country: England
- Region: South East England
- Non-metropolitan county: East Sussex
- Status: Non-metropolitan district
- Admin HQ: Newhaven
- Founded: 1 April 1974

Government
  - Type: Non-metropolitan district council
  - Body: Lewes District Council

Area
  - Total: 112.74 sq mi (292.00 km^{2})
  - Rank: 120th (of 296)

Population (2025)
  - Total: 102,648
  - Rank: 245th (of 296)
  - Density: 910.47/sq mi (351.53/km^{2})

Ethnicity (2021)
  - Ethnic groups: List: 94.2% White; 2.5% Mixed; 1.9% Asian; 0.7% other; 0.7% Black

Religion (2021)
  - Religion: List: 48.2% no religion; 42.7% Christianity; 6.3% not stated; 0.8% Islam; 0.8% other; 0.6% Buddhism; 0.3% Hinduism; 0.3% Judaism; 0.1% Sikhism
- Time zone: UTC0 (GMT)
  - Summer (DST): UTC+1 (BST)
- ONS code: 21UF (ONS); E07000063 (GSS)
- OS grid reference: TQ420104

Lewes is a local government district in East Sussex, England. The district is named after the town of Lewes. The largest town is Seaford, and the council is based in Newhaven. The district also includes the towns of Peacehaven and Telscombe and numerous villages and surrounding rural areas.

The district lies on the south coast, and a large part of it lies within the South Downs National Park. The district covers an area of 113 sq mi (290 km^{2}), with 9 miles (14.5 km) of coastline. Plumpton Racecourse is within the district. There are 28 parishes in the district.

The neighbouring districts are Brighton and Hove, Mid Sussex and Wealden.

== History ==
The district was formed on 1 April 1974 under the Local Government Act 1972. The new district covered the area of four former districts, which were all abolished at the same time:

- Chailey Rural District
- Lewes Municipal Borough
- Newhaven Urban District
- Seaford Urban District

The new district was named after Lewes, the ancient county town of Sussex.

Since 2016 the council has shared a chief executive and other staff with nearby Eastbourne Borough Council.

Local government reorganisation is being considered for the area. In July 2026, the government announced reforms across East Sussex which included abolishing Lewes district. Under these proposals, East Saltdean, Telscombe and Peacehaven would be transferred to an enlarged Brighton and Hove, and the rest of the current Lewes district would become part of an East Sussex unitary authority. In September 2026 these proposals were paused for further review.

== Governance ==
Lewes District Council

Type
- Type: Non-metropolitan district

History
- Founded: 1 April 1974

Leadership
- Chair: Charlotte Keenan, Green since 26 May 2026
- Leader: Zoe Nicholson, Green since 22 May 2023
- Chief Executive: Robert Cottrill since 18 January 2016 (Note: Serves as shared chief executive to both Lewes District Council and Eastbourne Borough Council.)

Structure
- Seats: 41
- Graph of the party split among 41 seats.
- Political groups: Administration (18) Green (18) Other parties (23) Liberal Democrats (14) Labour (8) Independent (1)

Elections
- Voting system: First past the post
- Last election: 4 May 2023

Meeting place
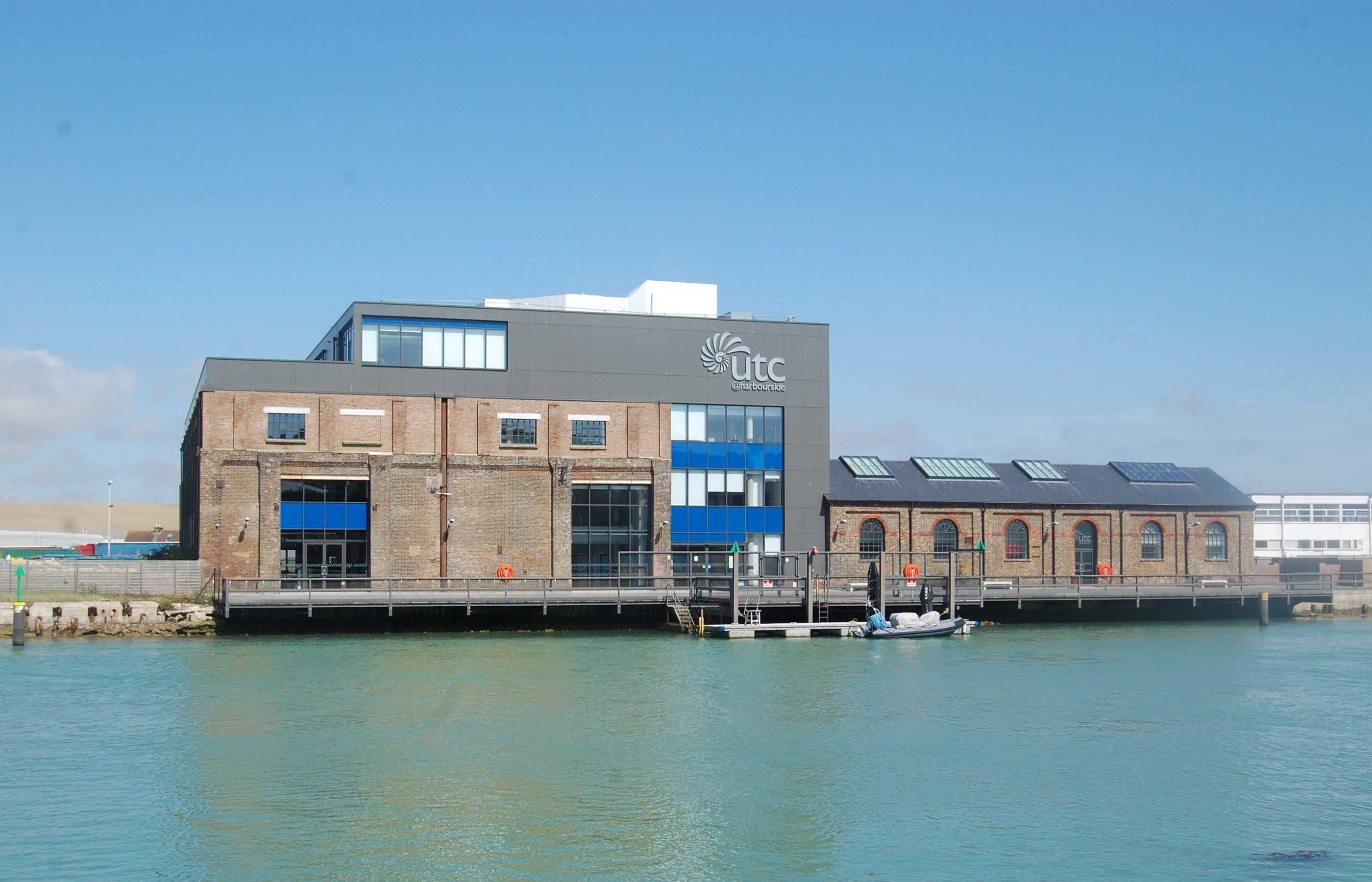
- Marine Workshops, Railway Quay, Newhaven, BN9 0ER

Website
- www.lewes-eastbourne.gov.uk

Lewes District Council provides district-level services. County-level services are provided by East Sussex County Council. The whole district is also covered by civil parishes, which form a third tier of local government.

In the parts of the district within the South Downs National Park, town planning is the responsibility of the South Downs National Park Authority. The district council appoints one of its councillors to serve on the 27-person National Park Authority.

=== Political control ===
The council has been under no overall control since 2018. Following the 2023 election an alliance of the Greens and Labour formed the council's administration. The alliance separated in October 2026, leaving the Greens running the council as a minority administration.

The first election to the council was held in 1973, initially operating as a shadow authority alongside the outgoing authorities until the new arrangements took effect on 1 April 1974. Political control of the council since 1974 has been as follows:

Party in control	Years
Conservative	1974–1991
Liberal Democrats	1991–2011
Conservative	2011–2013
No overall control	2013–2015
Conservative	2015–2018
No overall control	2018–present

=== Leadership ===
The leaders of the council since 1999 have been:

Councillor	Party	From	To
Ann De Vecchi	Liberal Democrats	May 1999	May 2011
Tony Nicholson	Conservative	25 May 2011	20 Feb 2012
James Page	Conservative	20 Feb 2012	26 Feb 2014
Rob Blackman	Conservative	26 Feb 2014	Sep 2015
Andy Smith	Conservative	14 Oct 2015	May 2019
Isabelle Linington	Conservative	20 May 2019	15 Jul 2019
Zoe Nicholson	Green	15 Jul 2019	20 Jul 2020
James MacCleary	Liberal Democrats	20 Jul 2020	15 Jul 2021
Zoe Nicholson	Green	15 Jul 2021	18 Jul 2022
James MacCleary	Liberal Democrats	18 Jul 2022	May 2023
Zoe Nicholson	Green	22 May 2023	

=== Composition ===
Following the 2023 election, and changes of allegiance up to April 2026, the composition of the council was:

Party	Councillors
Green	18
Liberal Democrats	14
Labour	8
Independent	1
Total	41

=== Elections ===
Since the last boundary changes in 2019 the council has comprised 41 councillors representing 21 wards, with each ward electing one, two or three councillors. Elections are held every four years.

The wards, with their populations at the 2021 Census, are:

Ward	Population (2021 Census)	Number of Councillors	Population per Councillor
Chailey, Barcombe and Hamsey	5,204	2	2,602
Ditchling and Westmeston	2,554	1	2,554
East Saltdean and Telscombe Cliffs	7,394	3	2,461
Kingston	1,904	1	1,904
Lewes Bridge	4,834	2	2,417
Lewes Castle	3,964	2	1,982
Lewes Priory	7,916	3	2,639
Newhaven North	4,877	2	2,439
Newhaven South	7,814	2	2,605
Newick	2,446	1	2,446
Ouse Valley and Ringmer	6,513	3	2,171
Peacehaven East	5,377	2	2,689
Peacehaven North	5,186	2	2,593
Peacehaven West	4,872	2	2,436
Plumpton, Streat, East Chiltington and St John (Without)	2,222	1	2,222
Seaford Central	5,023	2	2,512
Seaford East	4,776	2	2,388
Seaford North	5,207	2	2,604
Seaford South	4,388	2	2,194
Seaford West	4,471	2	2,236
Wivelsfield	2,964	1	2,964
Total Lewes	99,905	41	2,437

The district straddles the constituencies of Lewes and Brighton Kemptown.

=== Premises ===
The council is based at Marine Workshops, a former industrial building in Newhaven which it shares with East Sussex Colleges Group.

When created in 1974 the council inherited four sets of offices from its predecessor councils:

- Lewes House, 32 High Street, Lewes from Chailey Rural District Council.
- Lewes Town Hall and the adjoining municipal offices at 4 Fisher Street from Lewes Town Council.
- 20 Fort Road, Newhaven from Newhaven Urban District Council.
- The Downs, Sutton Road, Seaford from Seaford Urban District Council.

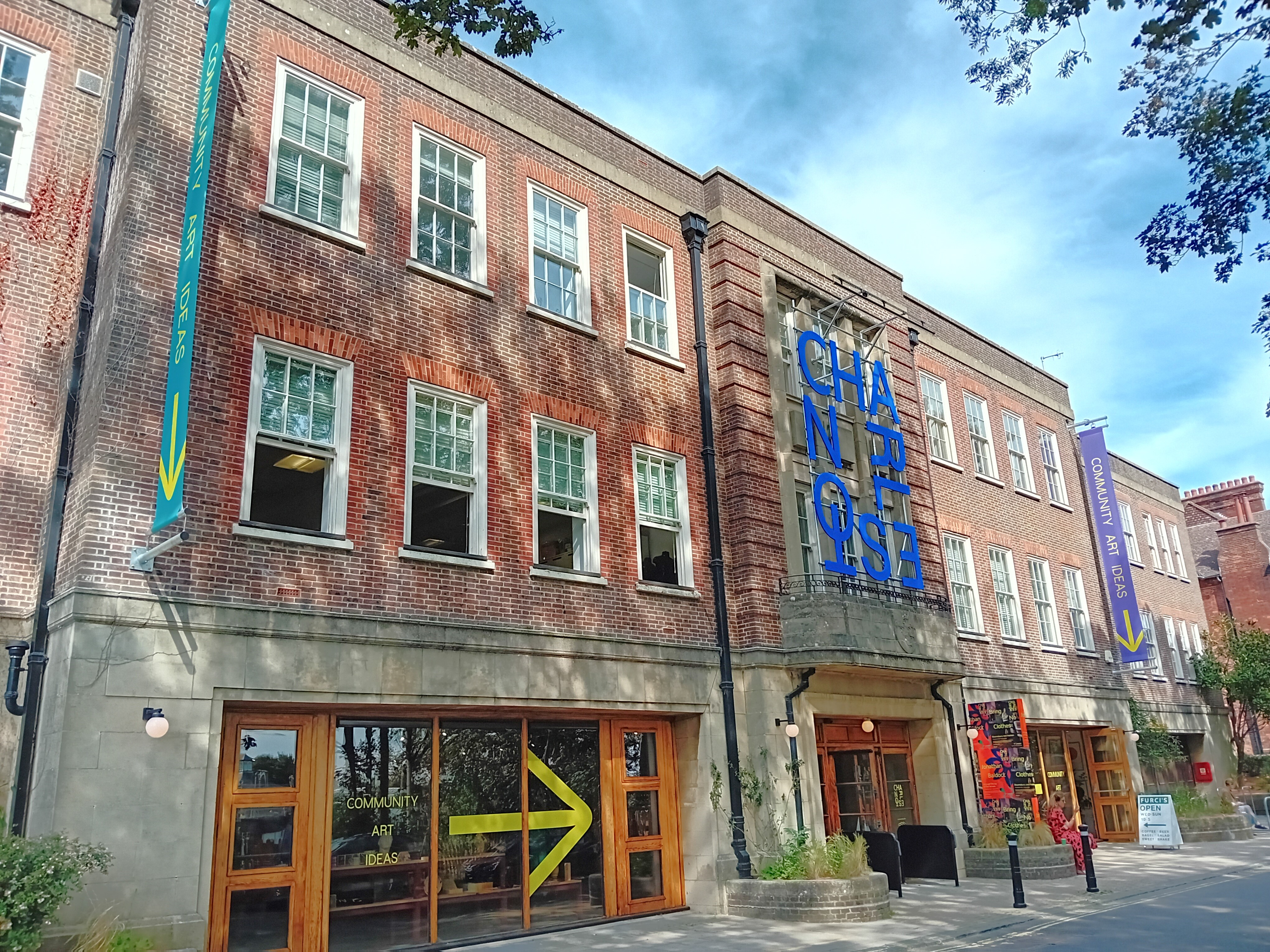
Southover House: Council's headquarters 1998–2022

The Downs was converted into housing and a leisure centre built behind it. The new council's offices were divided between the other three buildings. In 1998 the council acquired Southover House on Southover Road in Lewes, which had previously been offices of East Sussex County Council, to serve as its main offices, remaining there until 2023 when it moved to Marine Workshops.

== Geography ==
The Prime Meridian passes through the district.

Sussex Police has its head office in the town of Lewes.

=== Towns and parishes ===
The whole district is divided into civil parishes. The parish councils for Lewes, Newhaven, Peacehaven, Seaford and Telscombe take the style "town council". Some of the smaller parishes have a parish meeting rather than a parish council.

Parish	Type	Population (2021 Census)	Area (km^{2})	Pop Density per km^{2}
Barcombe	Parish Council	1,491	17.81	83.7
Beddingham	Parish Council	273	15.71	17.4
Chailey	Parish Council	2,975	17.81	119.4
Ditchling	Parish Council	2,265	15.50	146.1
East Chiltington & St John Without ‡	Parish Council	458	13.58	33.7
Falmer & St Ann Without ‡	Parish Council	250	17.02	14.7
Firle	Parish Council	267	13.87	19.3
Glynde & Tarring Neville ‡	Parish Council	194	9.72	20.0
Hamsey	Parish Council	734	11.44	64.2
Iford	Parish Meeting	177	9.71	18.2
Kingston near Lewes	Parish Council	816	5.70	143.1
Lewes	Town Council	16,723	11.42	1,464.4
Newhaven	Town Council	12,693	7.18	1,767.6
Newick	Parish Council	2,445	7.80	313.4
Peacehaven	Town Council	15,442	5.18	2,979.4
Piddinghoe	Parish Council	234	3.80	61.5
Plumpton	Parish Council	1,599	9.66	165.5
Ringmer	Parish Council	4,765	25.91	183.9
Rodmell & Southease ‡	Parish Council	429	11.27	38.1
Seaford	Town Council	23,865	17.31	1,378.7
South Heighton	Parish Council	1,015	8.49	119.6
Streat	Parish Meeting	164	5.18	31.6
Telscombe	Town Council	7,392	4.73	1,563.5
Westmeston	Parish Council	290	8.48	34.2
Wivelsfield	Parish Council	2,960	10.79	274.3
Total Lewes		99,905	292.10	342.0

‡ St John Without, St Ann Without, Tarring Neville and Southease are separate civil parishes with parish meetings, but due to their small size population statistics are not published separately for them.
