= Lewes Brooks =

Site of Special Scientific Interest in Lewes District, England

Coordinates: 50.850°N 0.017°E

- Site of Special Scientific Interest
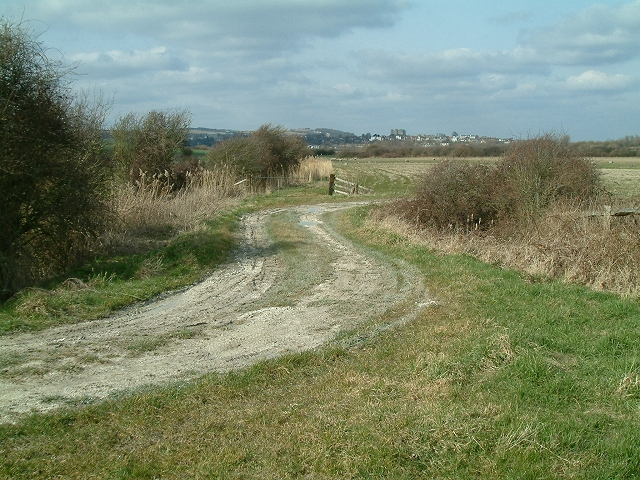
- Location of Lewes Brooks.
- Area of search: East Sussex
- Grid reference: TQ 421 076
- Interest: Biological
- Area: 339.1 hectares (838 acres)
- Notification date: 1988
- Location map: Magic Map

Lewes Brooks is a 339.1-hectare (838-acre) biological Site of Special Scientific Interest south of Lewes in East Sussex. The Falmer-Glynde and the Ouse valleys meet in Lewes Brooks, and the Upper and Lower Rises are the remains of the chalk uplands eroded by the Ouse.

This site is on the flood plain of the River Ouse, and has fields separated by ditches. Variations in salinity from brackish to spring-fed, together with periodic clearing of ditches, produce a variety of habitats. The site is home to a diverse array of invertebrate fauna, especially water beetles. There are also rare snails, flies and moths.
