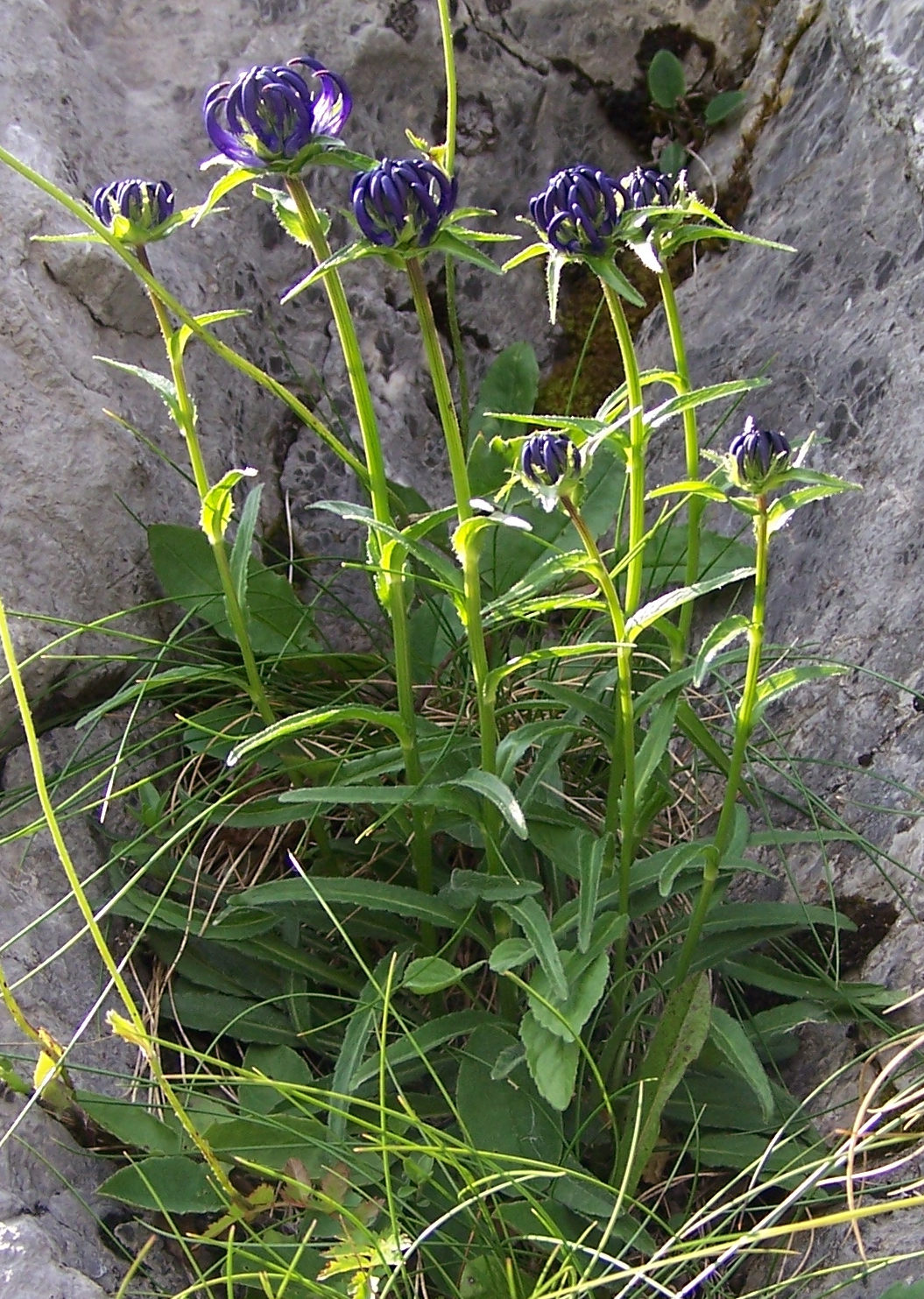
- Plant of Phyteuma orbiculare

Scientific classification
- Kingdom: Plantae
- Clade: Tracheophytes
- Clade: Angiosperms
- Clade: Eudicots
- Clade: Asterids
- Order: Asterales
- Family: Campanulaceae
- Genus: Phyteuma
- Species: P. orbiculare

Binomial name
- Phyteuma orbiculare L., 1753

Synonyms
- Rapunculus orbicularis (L.) Mill. (1768); Phyteuma tenerum

= Phyteuma orbiculare =

Species of flowering plant

Phyteuma orbiculare, common name round-headed rampion or Pride of Sussex, is a herbaceous perennial plant of the genus Phyteuma belonging to the family Campanulaceae.

== Description ==
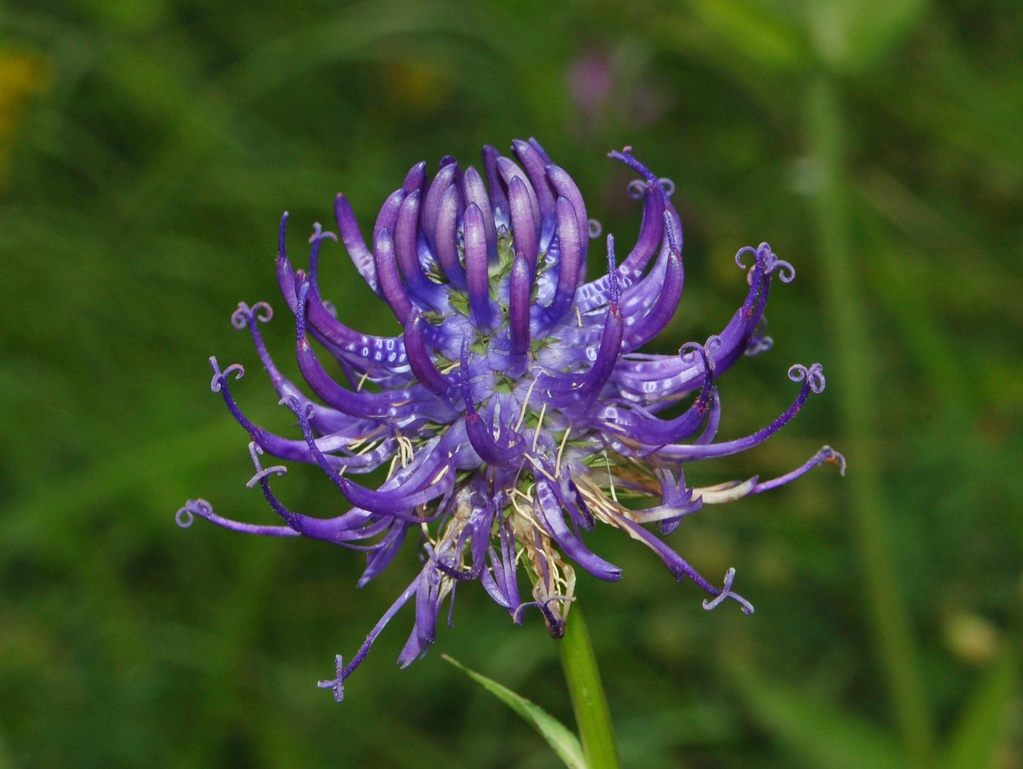
Close-up of flowers of Phyteuma orbiculare

Phyteuma orbiculare reaches on average 20–50 centimetres (7.9–19.7 in) of height. A deep blue, almost purple wildflower that is not as it seems: each head, rather than being a single bloom, is actually a collection of smaller ones, huddled together.

The stem is erect, simple, glabrous and striated, the leaves vary in shape on a single plant, with larger, broader, ovate to lanceolate, serrated, petiolated leaves at the base of the stem and smaller, narrower, lanceolate to linear cauline leaves. The head-shaped inflorescence is a dense erect panicle of about 1.5–3 centimetres (0.59–1.18 in) of diameter, with usually 15 to 30 flowers. The petals are blue or violet-blue and form small tubes with an opening at the top. The outer bracts are lanceolate and usually two to four times longer than wide. The flowering period extends from May to August. The fruit is a capsule containing numerous small seeds.

== Distribution ==
This plant is widespread in most of Europe from the Pyrenees to the Balkans. The plant can be found at low altitudes in Western Europe and in mountains of Central Europe. In the United Kingdom, the plant is more common on the South Downs than anywhere else.

== Habitat ==
This species grows mainly in grasslands, meadows, pasturelands, and pine forests. It prefers full sun exposure on calcareous soils, at an altitude of 600–2,400 metres (2,000–7,900 ft) above sea level. In the UK, its habitat is chalk grassland.

== Subspecies ==
- Phyteuma orbiculare subsp. flexuosum R. Schulz
- Phyteuma orbiculare subsp. montanum R. Schultz
- Phyteuma orbiculare subsp. orbiculare

== Culture ==
The round-headed rampion is known colloquially in the county of Sussex, England as the Pride of Sussex. It is also the County flower of Sussex. As Sussex's county flower, its name was chosen for the Rampion Wind Farm, a wind farm off the coast of Sussex.
