= History of local government in Sussex =

The history of local government in Sussex is unique and complex. Founded as a kingdom in the 5th century, Sussex was annexed by the kingdom of Wessex in the 9th century, which after further developments became the Kingdom of England. It currently corresponds to two counties, East Sussex and West Sussex.

After the Reform Act 1832 Sussex was divided for purposes of administration into an eastern and a western division; these divisions were coterminous with the two archdeaconries of Chichester and Lewes and also the three eastern and three western county subdivisions respectively. In 1889, following the Local Government Act 1888, using those same boundaries, Sussex was divided into two administrative counties, East Sussex and West Sussex, together with two self-governing county boroughs, Brighton and Hastings, later joined by Eastbourne. In 1974, under the Local Government Act 1972, the county boundaries were revised with the mid-Sussex areas of East Grinstead, Haywards Heath, Burgess Hill and Hassocks being transferred from the administrative area of East Sussex into that of West Sussex, along with the Gatwick area that historically has been part of Surrey. The county boroughs were returned to the control of the two county councils but in 1997 the towns of Brighton and Hove were amalgamated as a unitary local authority and in 2000, Brighton and Hove was given city status.

There continue to be a range of organisations that operate across the entirety of Sussex, even though it is administered as two non-metropolitan counties of East and West Sussex. Organisations providing public services to across Sussex include Sussex Police, NHS Sussex, and the Sussex Inshore Fisheries and Conservation Authority. Sussex is recognised as a single cultural region, significant in culture and sport and is used by a range of organisations as a regional unit.

== Saxon period ==
Sussex and the other main Anglo-Saxon kingdoms at about AD600

Sussex originated in the 5th century as the Kingdom of Sussex, which in the 9th century was annexed by the Kingdom of Wessex, which with further expansions became the Kingdom of England. While Sussex retained its independence it is likely that it would have had a regular assembly or folkmoot.

Sussex seems to have had a greater degree of decentralisation than other kingdoms. For a period during the 760s there may have been as many as four of five kings based within the territory, perhaps with each ruling over a distinct tribal territory, perhaps on a temporary basis. It seems possible that the people of the Haestingas may have had their own ruler for a while, and another sub-division may have been along the River Adur.

At some stage in the Saxon period Sussex was divided into administrative areas which became known as 'rapes'. It is possible that the rapes represent the shires of the ancient kingdom of Sussex, especially as in the 12th century they had sheriffs of their own. Another possibility is that the rapes may derive from the system of fortifications, or burhs (boroughs) devised by Alfred the Great in the late ninth century to defeat the Vikings.

Various local folkmoots would have been held in Sussex, for instance at Ditchling, Tinhale (in Bersted) and Madehurst. Placename evidence for early assemblies in Sussex comes from Tinhale (from the Old English þing (thing) meaning hold a meeting, so 'meeting-hill') and Madehurst (from the Old English maedel meaning assembly, so 'assembly wooded hill'). There is also a location in Durrington that had the name gemot biorh meaning a moot barrow or meeting barrow, a boundary barrow.

The early hundreds often lacked the formality of later attempts of local government: frequently they met in the open, at a convenient central spot, perhaps marked by a tree, as at Easebourne. Dill, meaning the boarded meeting place, was one of the few hundreds in Sussex that provided any accommodation. From the 10th century onwards the hundred became important as a court of justice as well as dealing with matters of local administration. The meeting place was often a point within the hundred such as a bridge (as in the bridge over the western River Rother in Rotherbridge hundred) or a notable tree (such as a tree called Tippa's Oak in Tipnoak hundred).

== Late medieval period ==
At the time of the Norman Conquest there were four rapes: Arundel, Lewes, Pevensey and Hastings. By the time of the Domesday Book, William the Conqueror had created the Rape of Bramber out of parts of the Arundel and Lewes rapes, so that the Adur estuary could be better defended. Between 1250 and 1262, the rape of Chichester was created from the western half of Arundel rape. From this time onwards, Sussex was divided into—from west to east—Chichester, Arundel, Bramber, Lewes, Pevensey and Hastings rapes.

Although the origin and original purpose of the rapes is not known, their function after 1066 is clear. With its own lord and sheriff, each rape was an administrative and fiscal unit.

== Early modern period ==
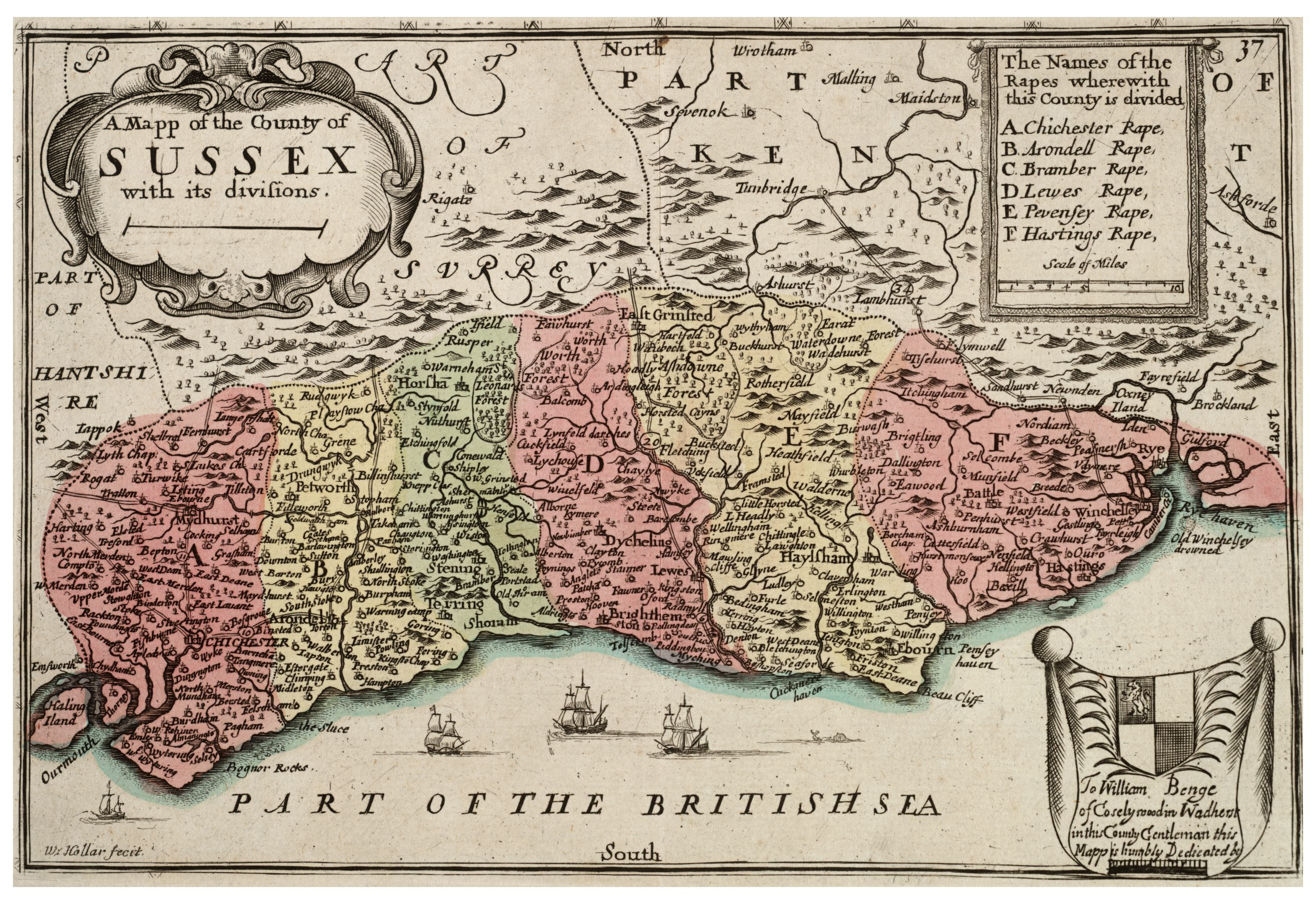
17th century map by Wenceslas Hollar showing the six Rapes of Sussex, including the Rape of Chichester, which existed from the 13th century

Administering such an extensive county as Sussex as a single unit had proved difficult: the traditional meeting of the court of quarter sessions at Chichester in the south-west was a long distance from much of the county's population and no single venue met the needs of such a diverse county. A statute of 1504 created a system where the sheriff's court alternated between Chichester and Lewes. By the 1590s every administrative arrangement within local control respected the subdivision of the county into an eastern division, made up of the rapes of Hastings, Lewes and Pevensey, and a western division, made up of the rapes of Arundel, Bramber and Chichester.

Sussex hosted seven rather than the usual four quarter sessions. During the assigned weeks for Epiphany, Easter and Michaelmas, one court convened at the western section of Sussex on Mondays and Tuesdays and another court convened in the eastern section on Thursdays and Fridays. The western meetings followed a geographical rotation between Chichester, Petworth, Arundel and Midhurst; the eastern sessions always took place at Lewes. The Midsummer quarter session took place for the whole of Sussex at either East Grinstead or Horsham. By the reign of Elizabeth I the quarter sessions for eastern and western Sussex were effectively independent and the office of the Clerk of the Peace was the sole administrative link between the two.

The rapal courts continued to meet and stewards for the rapes were recorded into the 18th century.

== 19th century ==
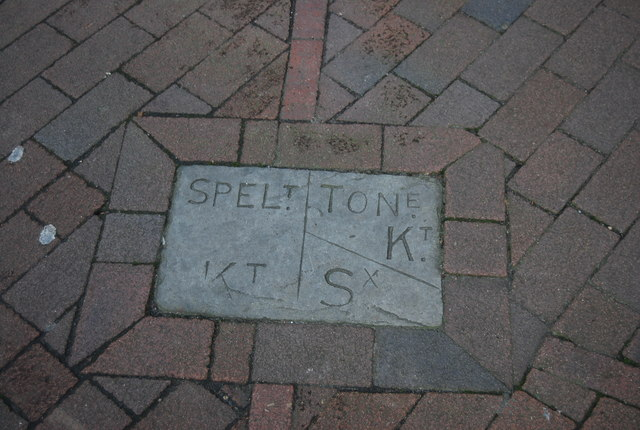
This boundary stone in the centre of Tunbridge Wells marks the historic boundary between Sussex and Kent; after the Local Government Act 1894 the south of Tunbridge Wells and the south of Lamberhurst were administered as part of Kent

By 1835 several Sussex towns had borough status and as part of the Municipal Corporations Act 1835 a uniform system of municipal boroughs was introduced. In Sussex the towns of Arundel, Chichester, Hastings, Rye (all 1836); Brighton 1854, Lewes 1881 were all incorporated as municipal boroughs. Under the Municipal Corporations Act 1883 borough status was abolished in 1886 for the towns of Midhurst, Pevensey, Seaford and Winchelsea, whose corporations had not been reformed by the Municipal Corporations Act 1835. New municipal boroughs were later created in Boroughs incorporated in England and Wales 1882-1974 for Eastbourne (1883), Worthing (1890), Hove (1898) and Bexhill (1902).

Between 1834 and 1930 poor law unions existed for administration of poor law relief. In 1860 the north of parish of Frant in the Rape of Pevensey became part of the Tunbridge Wells Local Government District.

Together with several other counties (Cambridgeshire, Lincolnshire, Northamptonshire, Suffolk and Yorkshire) Sussex was for administrative purposes divided into an eastern division and a western division. An informal arrangement for several centuries, the division of Sussex for administrative purposes was formally confirmed through the County of Sussex Act 1865. In 1889 county councils were created for the eastern and western divisions and county boroughs were created as part of the Local Government Act 1888. The rapes of Arundel, Bramber and Chichester comprised Sussex's western division and the rapes of Lewes, Pevensey and Hastings comprised the eastern division, with the exclusion of the large towns of Brighton and Hastings which became county boroughs. Sussex continued to be classed as a single county under the act and retained a single lieutenancy and shrievalty.

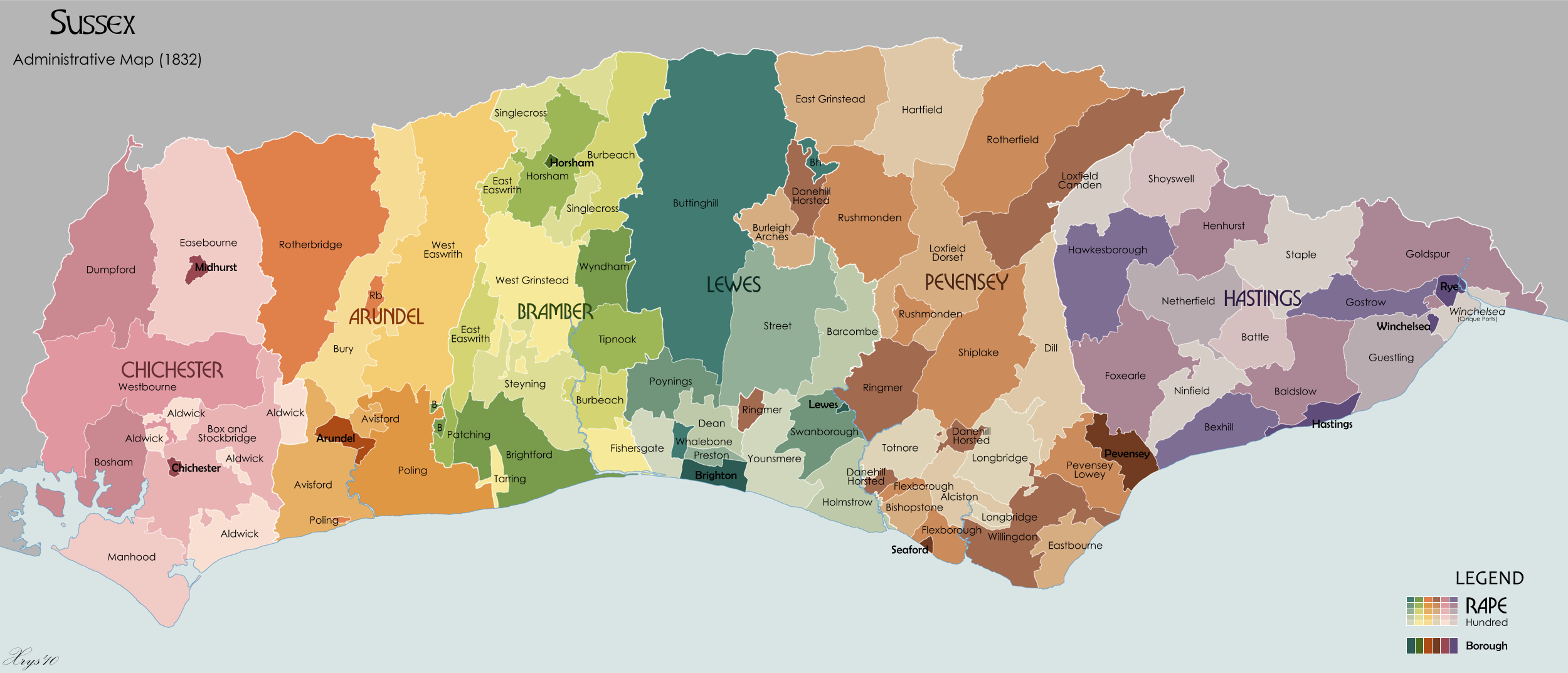
Map of Sussex in 1851 showing the six Rapes

In 1894 and 1895 minor boundary alterations between Sussex and Kent were made by the Local Government Board. The parish of Frant, which had lain within both counties was split with the Kent portions becoming the parishes of Broadwater Down (the southern area of Tunbridge Wells) and Tonbridge Rural. In 1895 Lamberhurst south of the River Teise transferred to Kent, while the Kent portions of Horsemonden and Broomhill were transferred to Sussex.

Sub-division	Rapes	Top tier local authorities in 1889	Changes to top tier local authorities 1889-1974
Eastern	Hastings, Lewes, Pevensey	East Sussex (administrative county), Brighton, Hastings (county boroughs)	Boundary changes in 1894, 1895, 1897, 1900, 1909, 1926, 1928, 1938, 1952 and 1953. Eastbourne became county borough in 1911.
Western	Arundel, Bramber, Chichester,	West Sussex (administrative county)	Boundary changes in 1894, 1895, 1908 and 1953.

In 1894 the remainder of each administrative county, that was not a county borough or municipal ('non-county') borough, was divided into urban and rural districts by the Local Government Act 1894 (56 & 57 Vict. c. 73). A new county borough for Eastbourne was created in 1911.

== Local government districts, 1894–1974 ==
The local government districts created in 1894 remained largely unchanged until the 1930s. The Local Government Act 1929 and Local Government Act 1933 gave county councils to carry out reviews and eliminate smaller districts and carry out amalgamations to provide more effective council areas. Changes were made in West Sussex in 1933 and in East Sussex in 1934.

=== East Sussex ===
District	Changes
Battle Rural District	Absorbed Battle Urban District, Hastings Rural District, Rye Rural District, most of Ticehurst Rural District in 1934
Battle Urban District	Absorbed by Battle Rural District 1934
Bexhill Urban District	Incorporated as Borough of Bexhill-on-Sea 1902
Burgess Hill Urban District	
Chailey Rural District	Absorbed Newhaven Rural District 1934
Cuckfield Rural District	Included one parish in West Sussex (Albourne) until 1908 when the parish was moved into East Sussex. Absorbed part of East Grinstead Rural District 1934
Cuckfield Urban District	Absorbed Haywards Heath Urban District 1934
Eastbourne Borough	Created a county borough in 1911
Eastbourne Rural District	Absorbed by Hailsham Rural District 1934
East Grinstead Rural District	Absorbed by Cuckfield and Uckfield Rural Districts 1934
East Grinstead Urban District	
Hailsham Rural District	Absorbed Eastbourne Rural District 1934
Hastings Rural District	Absorbed by Battle Rural District 1934
Haywards Heath Urban District	Absorbed by Cuckfield Urban District 1934
Hove Urban District	Incorporated as a borough in 1898. Absorbed part of Steyning East Rural District 1928
Lewes Borough	
Newhaven Rural District	Part absorbed by Brighton County Borough in 1928; remainder partitioned amongst Chailey Rural District, Newhaven Urban District and Seaford Urban District in 1934, when Chailey RD ceded some parishes to Lewes Borough.
Newhaven Urban District	
Portslade by Sea Urban District	Created 1898 from part of Steyning East Rural District
Rye Borough	
Rye Rural District	Absorbed by Battle Rural District 1934
Seaford Urban District	
Steyning East Rural District	Abolished 1928: part to Brighton County borough, part to Hove Borough, part to Cuckfield Rural District 1928
Ticehurst Rural District	Abolished 1934, most to Battle Rural District, Part to Uckfield Rural District
Uckfield Rural District	Absorbed Uckfield Urban District, part of East Grinstead Rural District, part of Ticehurst Urban District 1934

=== West Sussex ===
District	Changes
Arundel Borough	
Bognor Urban District	Renamed Bognor Regis Urban District 1929
Chanctonbury Rural District	Formed 1933 from parts of abolished Steyning West Rural District, Thakenham Rural District
Chichester City (Borough)	
Chichester Rural District	Formed 1933 from parts of abolished East Preston Rural District, Westbourne Rural District, Westhampnett Rural District
Crawley Urban District	Created 1956 from part of Horsham Rural District
Cuckfield Rural District (part only)	One West Sussex parish (Albourne) was in the rural district. In 1908 the parish was transferred to East Sussex and Cuckfield RD was entirely in that county.
East Preston Rural District	Abolished 1933, most went to form Worthing Rural District, part to Chichester Rural District
Horsham Rural District	Parish of Crawley became a separate urban district 1956
Horsham Urban District	
Littlehampton Urban District
Midhurst Rural District	
New Shoreham Urban District	Became part of Shoreham-by-Sea Urban district 1910
Petworth Rural District	
Shoreham-by-Sea Urban District	Formed 1910 from New Shoreham Urban District and part of Steyning West Rural District (Kingston by Sea). Enlarged 1933 by addition of Old Shoreham when Steyning West Rural District abolished
Southwick Urban District	Formed 1899 from part of Steyning West Rural District
Steyning West Rural District	Abolished 1933. Area divided between Chanctonbury Rural District and Shoreham-by-Sea Urban District
Thakenham Rural District	Abolished 1933. Most of area went to form Chanctonbury Rural District, part to Worthing Rural District
Westbourne Rural District	Abolished 1933, area went to form part of Chichester Rural District
Westhampnett Rural District	Abolished 1933. Became part of new Chichester Rural District
Worthing Borough	
Worthing Rural District	Created from parts of abolished East Preston Rural District, Thakenham Rural District

== Changes in 1974 ==
Local government in England was reformed in 1974 by the Local Government Act 1972. Under the act, the ridings lost their lieutenancies and shrievalties and the administrative counties, county boroughs and their councils were abolished. The area of Sussex was divided between a number of non-metropolitan counties:

County after 1974	Pre-1974 area
East Sussex	County boroughs of Brighton, Eastbourne and Hastings; municipal boroughs of Bexhill, Lewes and Rye together with the Newhaven, Portslade-by-Sea and Seaford urban districts and the Battle, Chailey, Hailsham and Uckfield rural districts, from the administrative county of East Sussex.
West Sussex	Municipal boroughs of Arundel, Chichester and Worthing together with the Bognor Regis, Crawley, Horsham, Littlehampton, Shoreham-by-Sea and Southwick urban districts and the Chanctonbury, Chichester, Midhurst, Petworth and Worthing rural districts from the administrative county of West Sussex Burgess Hill Urban District and Cuckfield rural district from the administrative county of East Sussex.

=== East Sussex ===
Brighton, Eastbourne and Hastings were county boroughs, which on 1 April 1974 became boroughs within the non-metropolitan county of East Sussex.

Pre-1974 District	Post-1974 Successor District
Battle Rural District	Rother
Bexhill Borough	Rother
Burgess Hill Urban District	Mid Sussex
Chailey Rural District	Lewes
Cuckfield Rural District	Mid Sussex, Crawley
Cuckfield Urban District	Mid Sussex
East Grinstead Urban District	Mid Sussex
Hailsham Rural District	Wealden
Hove Borough	Hove
Lewes Borough	Lewes
Newhaven Urban District	Lewes
Portslade-by-Sea Urban District	Hove
Rye Borough	Rother
Seaford Urban District	Lewes
Uckfield Rural District	Wealden

=== West Sussex ===
Pre-1974 District	Post-1974 Successor District
Arundel Borough	Arun
Bognor Regis Urban District	Arun
Chanctonbury Rural District	Horsham
Chichester Borough	Chichester
Chichester Rural District	Arun, Chichester
Crawley Urban District	Crawley
Horsham Rural District	Horsham
Horsham Urban District	Horsham
Littlehampton Urban District	Arun
Midhurst Rural District	Chichester
Petworth Rural District	Chichester
Shoreham-by-Sea Urban District	Adur
Southwick Urban District	Adur
Worthing Borough	Worthing
Worthing Rural District	Adur, Arun

The non-metropolitan counties became counties for purposes such as lieutenancy.

The urban districts of Burgess Hill, Cuckfield and East Grinstead, and nearly all of Cuckfield Rural District were transferred to the new district of Mid Sussex, while the remainder of Cuckfield Rural District was transferred to the borough of Crawley; both areas were transferred from the jurisdiction of East Sussex to that of West Sussex. Mid Sussex's change in county was argued under the Redcliffe-Maud Report's Planning Area enhancing a Second Wilson ministry plan with support from locally resident Lords and of the Heath ministry. Under this plan West Sussex gained an irregular swathe of East Sussex as far as East Grinstead in the north and in its initially passed form, Crawley would have gained two parishes in Surrey instead of the Gatwick part of these. The proposals met with some protest, a 1971 demonstration by 1,500 residents disrupted traffic on the main London to Brighton road at the proposed boundary. The changes were mostly reversed due to a local poll before its 1974 implementation, with the Charlwood and Horley Act 1974. East to West Sussex land re-designation was kept with the stated aim of uniting all areas affected by the projected major Crawley and Gatwick Airport economy under one supervisory local authority.

=== Royal Mail reaction ===
The Royal Mail adopted East and West Sussex as postal counties in 1974. Postal counties are no longer in official use.

== 1990s local government reform ==
A review of local government took place during the 1990s which made a number of changes to the counties created in 1974. Brighton regained its unitary status lost in 1974 by joining with the borough of Hove to form Brighton and Hove in 1997. Brighton and Hove subsequently attained city status in 2001.

== 21st century ==
The abolition of regional development agencies including the South East England Development Agency and the creation of local enterprise partnerships were announced as part of the June 2010 United Kingdom budget. On 29 June 2010 a letter was sent from the Department of Communities and Local Government and the Department for Business, Innovation and Skills to local authority and business leaders, inviting proposals to replace regional development agencies in their areas by 6 September 2010. Within Sussex two LEPs were created. The Coast to Capital LEP was created for West Sussex, Brighton and Hove and Lewes, plus parts of Surrey and south London. The South East LEP was created for East Sussex, Kent and Essex. The Lewes district participates in both LEPs.

The 21st century has seen greater partnership working between neighbouring authorities. Operating as Adur and Worthing Councils, Adur District Council and Worthing Borough Council have operated under a joint management structure, with a single Chief Executive, since 1 April 2008. Wider sharing arrangements between Eastbourne and Lewes were proposed in 2015.

In 2020, East Sussex and West Sussex County Councils started sharing their chief executive, Becky Shaw.

== Calls for devolution ==
Cultural historian Peter Brandon has called the current division of Sussex into east and west 'unnatural' and advocates the reunification of East and West Sussex while historian Chris Hare has called for a devolved regional assembly for Sussex. Brighton Kemptown MP, Lloyd Russell-Moyle has also called for a tax-raising Sussex Parliament, with similar powers to the Welsh Senedd, and for regional representation for Sussex in a reformed House of Lords.

Two devolution proposals involving Sussex local authorities were submitted to the UK Government in 2015. One proposal involved East and West Sussex County Councils together with Surrey County Council and district and borough councils. Another proposal involved the city of Brighton and Hove as well as Adur, Lewes, Mid Sussex and Worthing, which agreed the Greater Brighton City Deal in 2014.

In the 2020s, the government announced plans to replace all remaining county and district council areas with unitary authorities. Brighton and Hove will expand slightly into East Sussex, taking East Saltdean, Peacehaven, and Telscombe, and the remaining area will become a new East Sussex unitary authority. Final plans for West Sussex have been delayed Proposals for West Sussex include a single unitary authority for the entire county, supported by West Sussex County Council,, and a two-unitary proposal with Arun, Worthing and Adur forming a coastal unitary authority and Chichester, Horsham, Crawley and Mid Sussex forming a largely inland one. However, In September 2026 the plans were halted pending a review by the Ministry of Housing, Communities and Local Government, with the old authorities remaining in place until further notice.

== Headquarters of top tier and unitary authorities ==
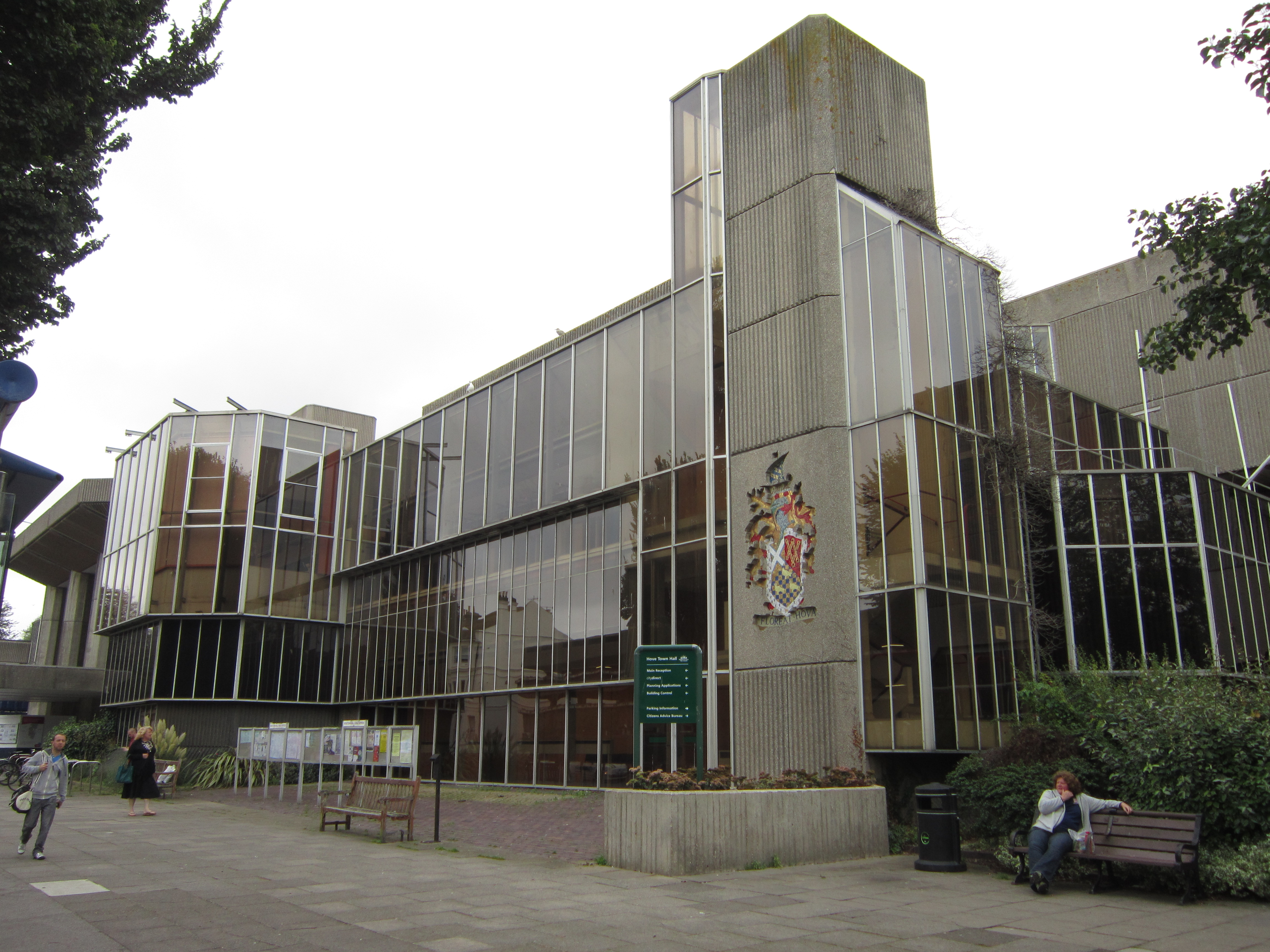
Hove Town Hall
Brighton and Hove Council

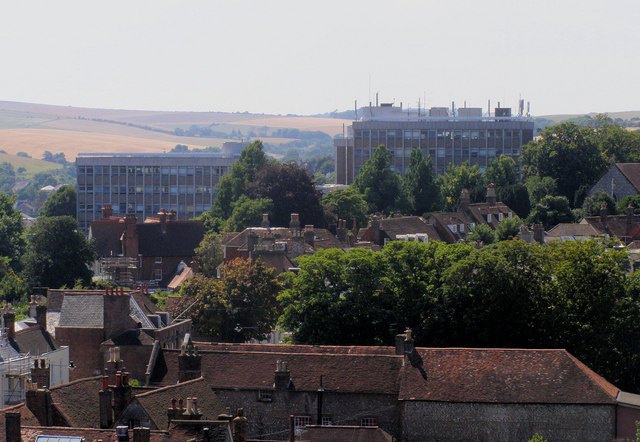
County Hall, Lewes
East Sussex County Council

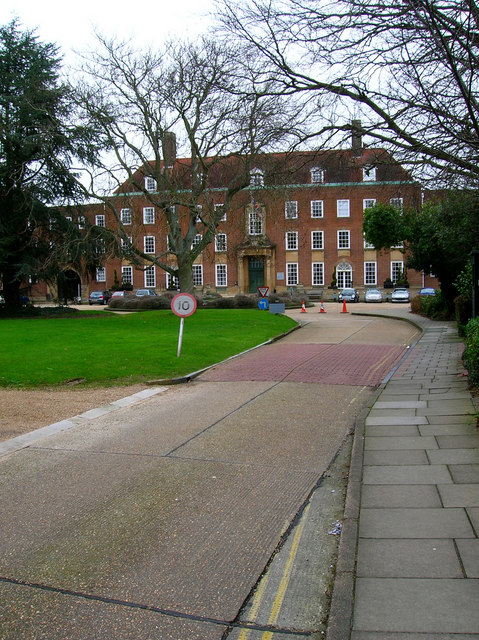
County Hall, Chichester
West Sussex County Council

== See also ==
- History of Sussex
- History of Christianity in Sussex
- History of local government in England
- History of local government in the United Kingdom
- Sussex Police and Crime Commissioner

== Bibliography ==
- Armstrong, J.R. (1971). A History of Sussex. Sussex: Phillimore. ISBN 978-0-85033-185-1.
- Brabant, Frederick Gaspard (1909). Rambles in Sussex. Sussex: Methuen.
- Brandon, Peter (2006). Sussex. London: Phillimore. ISBN 978-0-7090-6998-0.
- Grehan, John; Mace, Martin (2012). Battleground Sussex. Casemate Publishers. ISBN 978-1848846616.
- Hare, Chris (1995). A History of the Sussex People. Worthing: Southern Heritage Books. ISBN 978-0-9527097-0-1.
- Herrup, Cynthia B. (1989). The Common Peace: Participation and he Criminal Law in Seventeenth-Century England. Cambridge University Press. ISBN 978-0521375870.
- Lapidge, Michael; Blair, John; Keynes, Simon; Scragg, Donald (2013). The Wiley Blackwell Encyclopedia of Anglo-Saxon England. Wiley. ISBN 9780470656327.
- Lowerson, John (1980). A Short History of Sussex. Folkestone: Dawson Publishing. ISBN 0-7129-0948-6.
- Semple, Sarah (2013). Perceptions of the Prehistoric in Anglo-Saxon England: Religion, Ritual and Rulership in the Landscape. Oxford: Oxford University Press. ISBN 978-0199683109.
- Stubbs, William (1874). A Constitutional History of England in its Origin and Development, Volume 1. Clarendon Press.
