= Rape of Chichester =

Traditional geographic subdivision in Sussex, England

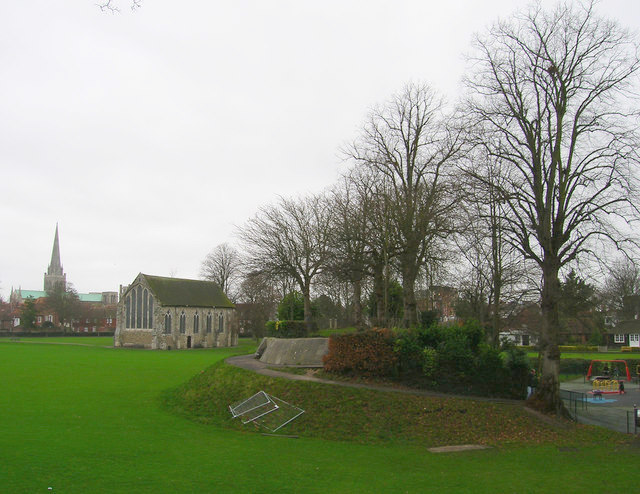
- Remains of Chichester Castle, once the administrative centre of the Rape

- The Rape of Chichester shown within Sussex
- Area
  - 1831: 145,840 acres (590.2 km^{2})
- Population
  - 1801: 21,608
  - 1811: 24,200
  - 1831: 38,929
- Density
  - 1831: 0.27 inhabitants per acre (67/km^{2})
- History
  - Created: by 1275
  - Succeeded by: Sussex (western division)
- Status: Rape (county subdivision)
  - HQ: Chichester
- Subdivisions
  - Type: Hundreds

The Rape of Chichester (also known as Chichester Rape) is one of the rapes, the traditional sub-divisions unique to the historic county of Sussex in England. The most westerly of the Sussex rapes, the rape of Chichester is a former barony, originally centred on Chichester Castle in the city of Chichester.

== History ==
The rape is not mentioned independently of 'the rape of Earl Roger' in the Domesday Book and passed by inheritance as a single unit, out of all proportion to the other rapes in size, until the 13th century. First mentioned as the 'Bailiwick (Balliua) of Chichester' in 1264, it first appeared by name as the rape of Chichester in the Hundred Rolls of 1275. It was referred to as the Rape de Cycestre in 1279, le rape de Cicestre in 1376 and of Chichestre in 1495.

The rape of Chichester was created out of the larger rape of Arundel. It would seem likely that the creation of this new division was connected with the partition of the estates of Hugh d'Aubigny, 5th Earl of Arundel, the last Earl of Arundel of his line, between his co-heirs after his death in 1243. While John FitzAlan acquired Arundel, Robert de Mohaut obtained the overlordship of the twelve fees constituting the honor of Halnaker, and certain other estates in the vicinity. The unity of overlordship being thus lost, it may have appeared convenient to divide this district into two separate rapes, which would be of a similar size and nature to those in the rest of Sussex. No trace of any orders given or measures taken to create the division of the old rape of Arundel has been found.

It is possible that the rape of Chichester may have existed before the Norman Conquest. The rapes in general pre-date the Norman Conquest and many rapes are based on King Alfred's fortifications in the Burghal Hidage. As Chichester was also a fortification in the Burghal Hidage, it is quite possible that it existed as a separate administrative unit in the Saxon era and was merged with neighbouring Arundel rape by William the Conqueror and given to Earl Roger of Montgomery. William might of course have created five rapes only, one of which, out of all proportion to the others in size, was afterwards divided, but for this there is no evidence.

The population of the rape of Chichester was 21,608 in 1801, rising to 24,200 in 1811 and 38,929 in 1831.

== Location ==
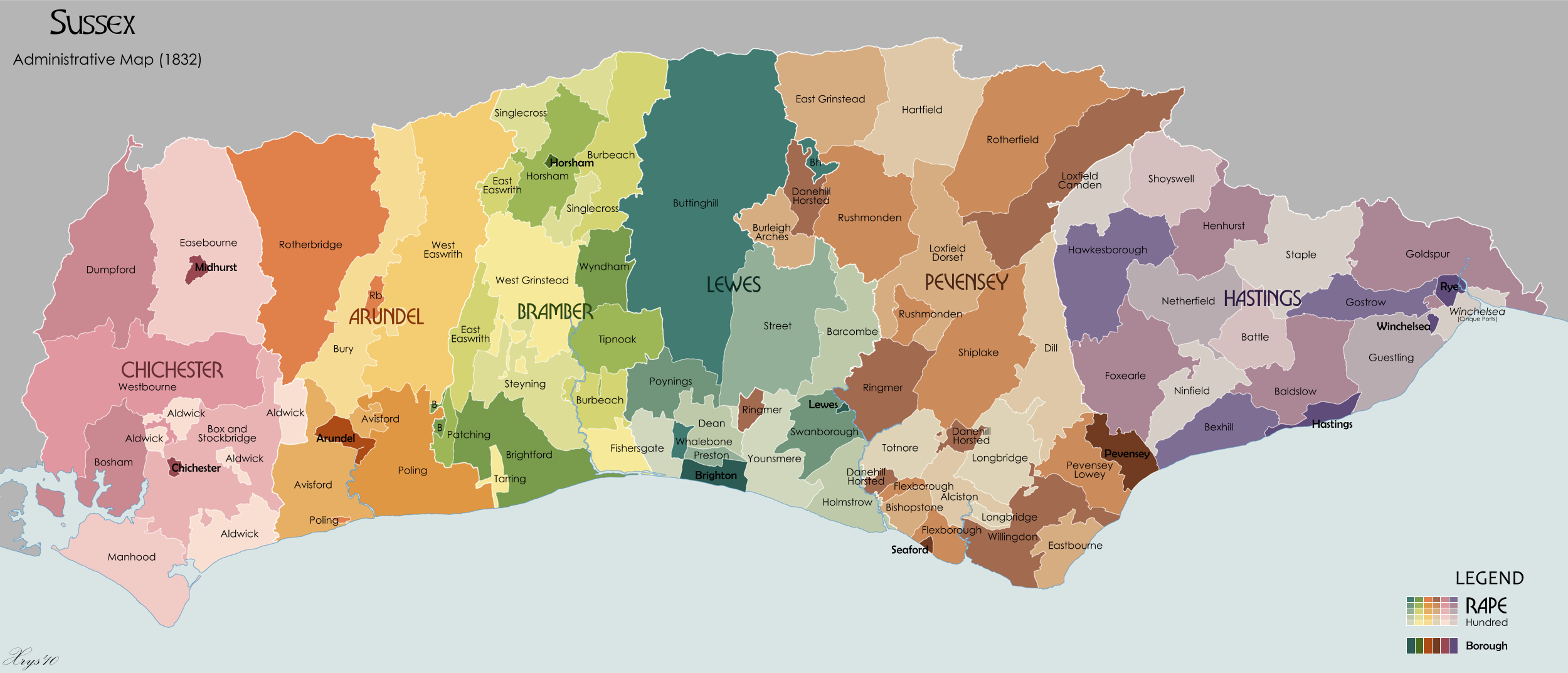
Location of the rape of Chichester within Sussex

The most westerly of all the Sussex rapes, the rape of Chichester borders the rape of Arundel to the east, with the county of Hampshire lying to the west and the county of Surrey to the north. The boundary between the Rapes of Chichester and Arundel started on the coast at the small stream dividing the parish of Pagham from that of Felpham. The boundary ran roughly due north, except for a divagation eastwards to include the parish of Slindon, which was a peculiar of the Archbishop of Canterbury and so was attached to the archbishop's hundred of Pagham. Once established it remained unaltered, the only change in the contents of the Rape being in 1844, when under the Counties (Detached Parts) Act 1844 the long narrow strip constituting North and South Ambersham was annexed to Sussex. Until that time it had been a detached part of the county of Hampshire, part of the parish of Steep.

The rape of Chichester includes the city of Chichester and the towns of Bognor Regis, Midhurst and Selsey. Its highest point is Blackdown, which at 280 metres (919 feet) is the highest point in all of Sussex.

== Historical population ==
Population 1801–1831
Year	Pop.	±%
1801	21,608	—
1811	24,200	+12.0%
1821	35,238	+45.6%
1831	38,929	+10.5%

== Sub-divisions ==
The rape is traditionally divided into the following hundreds:

- Aldwick
- Bosham
- Box (Boxgrove) and Stockbridge (which included Chichester)
- Dumpford
- Easebourne
- Manhood
- Westbourne (or Westbourne and Singleton)

== See also ==
- List of hundreds of England and Wales
- History of Sussex
