= Rape (county subdivision) =

County subdivision of Sussex, England

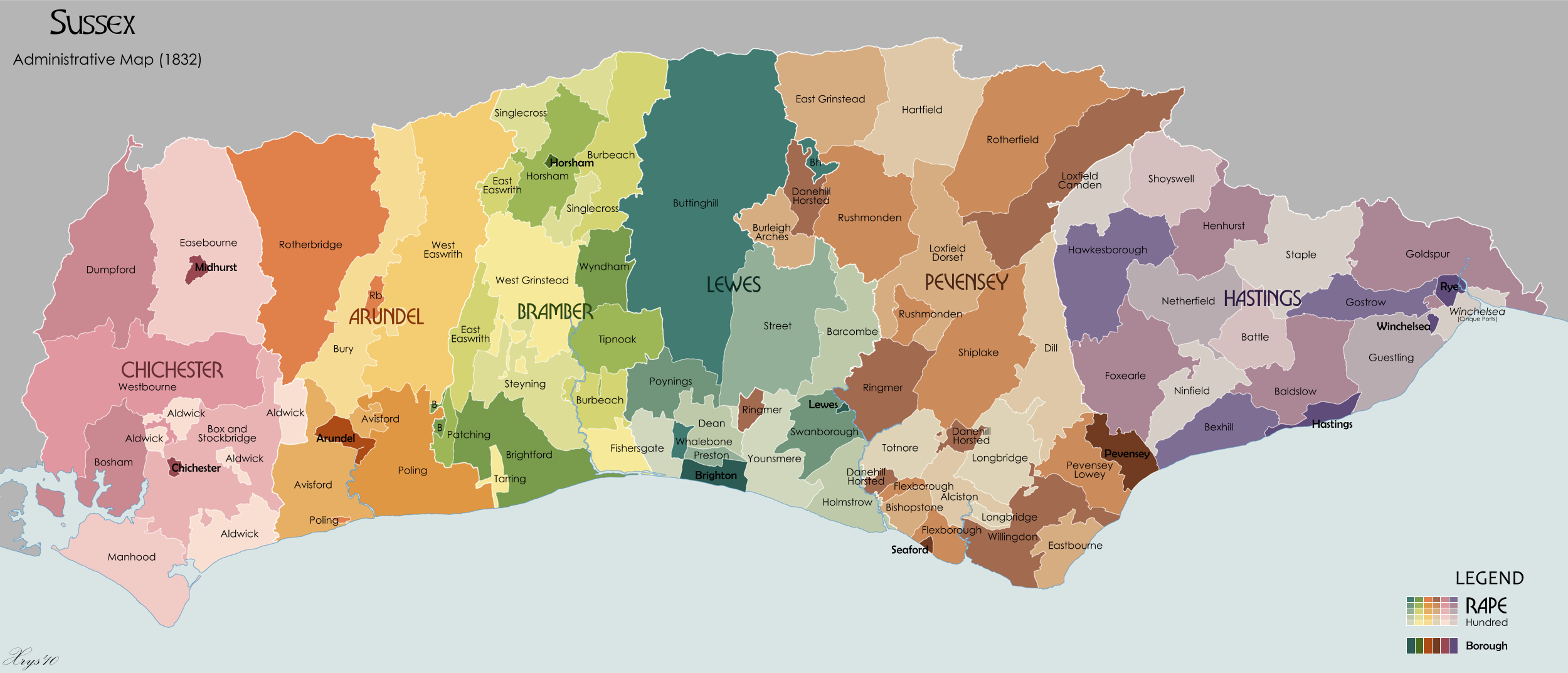
- Map of Sussex in 1832, showing the six rapes
- Category: County subdivision
- Location: Sussex
- Created: Saxon period (pre-1066); Rape of Bramber (by 1086); Rape of Chichester (by 1275)
- Number: 6
- Populations: 30,113 (Rape of Bramber) (1831) – 71,921 (Rape of Lewes) (1831)
- Areas: 116,650 acres (472.1 km^{2}) (Rape of Bramber) – 228,930 acres (926.4 km^{2}) (Rape of Pevensey)

A rape is a traditional territorial sub-division of the county of Sussex in England, formerly used for various administrative purposes. Their origin is unknown, but they appear to predate the Norman Conquest of 1066. Historically, the rapes formed the basis of local government in Sussex.

There are various theories about their origin. Possibly surviving from the Romano-British era or perhaps representing the shires of the kingdom of Sussex, the Sussex rapes, like the Kentish lathes, go back to the dawn of English history when their main function would have been to provide food rents and military manpower to the king. The rapes may also derive from the system of fortifications devised by Alfred the Great in the late ninth century to defeat the Vikings.

The Sussex rapes each had a headquarters in the developed south where the lord's hall, court, demesne lands, principal church and peasant holdings were located, whereas to the north there were smaller dependent settlements in the marsh, woodland and heath used for summer pasture. Each rape was split into several hundreds.

== Etymology ==
The toponymy of the rapes is unclear and debated to this day. First suggested by William Somner in the 17th century, it seems that the derivation of the word from the Old English rāp (rope) has been made practically certain. The suggestion that ropes were used to mark out territory, was well countered by J. H. Round, asking "do those who advance such views realize the size of the districts they have to deal with?" However, Heinrich Brunner explained the application of "rope" to an administrative district by the old German custom of defining the limits of the "peace" of popular open-air courts by stakes and ropes, the ropes then giving a name first to the court and then afterwards to the area of its jurisdiction, and produced a case where reep, the Dutch cognate of rāp, is applied to such a judicial area. The parish of Rope, in Cheshire is one place name in England derived from the word rāp.

The Saxon origin has been questioned, as the Normans showed little interest in learning the English language, and thus it seems unlikely that they would have adopted a local word. It has been suggested that the term comes from the old French raper, meaning to seize or take by force.

One suggested etymology of the word, from Edward Lye in the 18th century, is in the Icelandic territorial division hreppr, meaning 'district or tract of land'. However, this is rejected in the New English Dictionary, and according to the English Place-Name Society is "phonologically impossible".

== History ==
=== Origins ===
The origin of the rapes is not known. It is possible that the rapes represent the shires of the ancient kingdom of Sussex, especially as in the 12th century they had sheriffs of their own. According to John Morris the boundary between the Rapes of Lewes and Pevensey, which cuts through the middle of Lewes, probably pre-dates the founding of Lewes in the late 9th or early 10th century. If one boundary had existed so early then it is quite possible that other boundaries also existed. Sussex's rapes may have been a similar division to the six or seven lathes of neighbouring Kent which were undoubtedly early administrative units.

Another possibility is that the rapes may derive from the system of fortifications, or burhs (boroughs) devised by Alfred the Great in the late ninth century to defeat the Vikings. The rapes, or similar predecessors may have been created for the purpose of maintaining these early boroughs, or they may have re-used earlier divisions for this purpose. In Sussex, the fortifications in the Burghal Hidage were recorded as being at Eorpeburnan on the Sussex-Kent border, Hastings, Lewes, Burpham and Chichester. The "Burghal Hidage" lists boroughs in geographical order. Burpham was the predecessor of Arundel and Eorpeburnan or Heorpeburnan should be the predecessor of Rye. Pevensey and Steyning were not included. It looks as if the lands of Steyning served Lewes and those of Pevensey served Hastings, while the eastern portion of the later Hastings rape was attached to the Rye area. It is possible that these divisions might be rapes as four of them (taking Burpham as equivalent to neighbouring Arundel) had the same centres as later rapes. If this is the case then the rapes must have been completely reorganised in the next century and a half. Since the system of fortifications introduced by Alfred the Great extended into Surrey and Wessex as well, but neither of these regions have rapes or any similar sub-divisions.

It is also possible that the "rape of Arundel" that is twice mentioned in the Domesday Book of 1086 was the later rape of Arundel and not the whole "rape of Earl Roger (of Montgomery)", which included the later rape of Chichester. The Normans are not likely to have created rapes and then to have at once thrown two of them into one. The existence of the rapes before the Norman Conquest provides the most natural explanation of the fact that the two later rapes of Chichester and Arundel are represented in the Domesday Book of the single "rape of Earl Roger", William the Conqueror's most important grantee in Sussex. William might of course have created five rapes only, one of which, out of all proportion to the others in size, was afterwards divided, but for this there is no evidence.

=== Norman castleries ===
At the time of the Norman Conquest there were four rapes: Arundel, Lewes, Pevensey and Hastings. Arundel and Bramber replaced Burpham and Steyning as Rapal centres. The rape of Arundel consisted of the entire area of Sussex west of the River Adur, corresponding to the boundaries of both the western division of the church in Sussex (the forerunner to the archdeaconry of Chichester) and the boundaries of the traditional western area of the Sussex dialect. By the time of the Domesday Book, William the Conqueror had created the rape of Bramber as an afterthought out of parts of the Arundel and Lewes rapes, so that the Adur estuary could be better defended. Although the origin and original purpose of the Rapes is not known, their function after 1066 is clear. With its own lord and sheriff, each Rape was an administrative and fiscal unit. The organisation of the whole of Sussex apart from royal and church lands into territorial blocks each with a fortress near the sea was exceptional. Situated between Normandy and London, control over Sussex was strategically important to William the Conqueror, who needed to protect his major communication routes. Also as the ancestral home of the last Saxon king of England, Harold Godwinson, William had to be careful to secure Sussex against revolt. William did this by dividing Sussex into territories. Under the Normans each traditional rape was now centred on a castle: Sir Henry Ellis's observation that the rapes "were military districts for the supply of the castles which existed in each" applied to the Anglo-Norman period The castles formed a network of strongholds which, as well as deterring insurgency and preventing invasion also acted as regional administrative centres. Each rape had a single sheriff and ran as a strip, north–south, from the border with Surrey/Kent to the English Channel. The castles of Arundel, Bramber and Lewes were sited on positions overlooking the rivers Arun, Adur and Ouse respectively, while those at Chichester, Hastings and Pevensey overlooked the coast.

In the Domesday survey, five great Norman lords held the rapes into which Sussex was divided, four of them giving their names to four of the five divisions as they were called in Domesday Book; at the accession of King Henry I in 1100 they were Robert of Bellême in Arundel rape, Robert's nephew William, Count of Mortain in Pevensey, William of Warenne in Lewes, the count of Eu in Hastings and, the only fully trustworthy Sussex lord at the time, Philip de Braose in Bramber. These lords had succeeded, not to similar Anglo-Saxon magnates, but to a crowd of lesser landholders: each also held lands in the rapes of others.

Between 1250 and 1262, the rape of Chichester was created from the western half of Arundel rape. From this time onwards, Sussex was divided into—from west to east—Chichester, Arundel, Bramber, Lewes, Pevensey and Hastings rapes.

=== Modern period ===
The rapal courts continued to meet and stewards for the rapes were recorded into the 18th century. In the 17th century an annual muster took place at the same place in each Rape, such as at Ditchling Common for the Lewes Rape and Berwick Common for the Rape of Pevensey. The muster could take place more frequently at times of perceived danger. Each Rape also had a horse company which would meet at Bury Hill for the Rapes of Arundel, Bramber and Chichester, and at Piltdown for the Rapes of Hastings, Lewes and Pevensey.

By 1894 most administrative functions of the rapes had ended. The western rapes (Arundel, Bramber and Chichester) each held responsibility for the repair of bridges, and the Rape of Hastings had a separate coroner, which lasted until 1960.

In 2018, flags for each of the six rapes were designed for the Sussex Association by the vexillographer, Brady Ells. Ells had previously campaigned for the flag of Sussex to be registered by the Flag Institute in 2010.

== The Sussex Rapes ==
Name	Rapal town	Norman caput or castle	Area			Hundreds	Towns and cities	Highest point		
Name	Rapal town	Norman caput or castle	km^{2}	sq mi	rank	Hundreds	Towns and cities	Name	m	ft
Rape of Chichester	Chichester	Chichester Castle	590	230	3	Aldwick, Bosham, Box and Stockbridge, Dumpford, Easebourne, Manhood, Westbourne and Singleton	Chichester, Bognor Regis, Selsey, Midhurst	Blackdown	280	920
Rape of Arundel	Arundel	Arundel Castle	537	207	4	Avisford, Bury, Poling, Rotherbridge, West Easwrith	Littlehampton, Arundel	Glatting Beacon	245	804
Rape of Bramber	Bramber	Bramber Castle	472	182	6	Brightford, Burbeach, East Easwrith, Fishersgate, Patching, Singlecross, Steyning, Tarring, Tipnoak, West Grinstead, Windham and Ewhurst	Worthing, (Note: All the former parishes that make up the borough of Worthing are within the Rape of Bramber except for that of Goring-by-Sea.) Horsham, Crawley (west), (Note: The former parish of Crawley and areas to the east are included in the Rape of Lewes; the parish of Ifield is included within the Rape of Bramber.) Shoreham-by-Sea, Southwick, Steyning	Chanctonbury Hill	242	794
Rape of Lewes	Lewes	Lewes Castle	524	202	5	Barcombe, Buttinghill, Dean, Fishersgate, Holmstrow, Poynings, Preston, Street, Swanborough, Whalebone, Younsmere	Brighton and Hove, Crawley (centre and east), Burgess Hill, Haywards Heath, Lewes, Peacehaven, Newhaven, Telscombe	Ditchling Beacon	248	814
Rape of Pevensey	Pevensey	Pevensey Castle	926	358	1	Alciston, Bishopstone, Burleigh Arches, Danehill Horsted, Dill, East Grinstead, Eastbourne, Flexborough, Hartfield, Longbridge, Loxfield Dorset, Loxfield Pelham, Pevensey Lowey, Ringmer, Rotherfield, Rushmonden, Shiplake, Totnore, Willingdon	Eastbourne, Seaford, East Grinstead, Crowborough, Hailsham, Uckfield, Heathfield	Crowborough	242	794
Rape of Hastings	Hastings	Hastings Castle	624	241	2	Baldstrow, Battle, Bexhill, Foxearle, Goldspur, Gostrow, Guestling, Hawkesborough, Henhurst, Netherfield, Ninfield, Shoyswell	Hastings, Bexhill-on-Sea, Rye, Battle	Brightling Down	197	646

=== Rapal castles ===
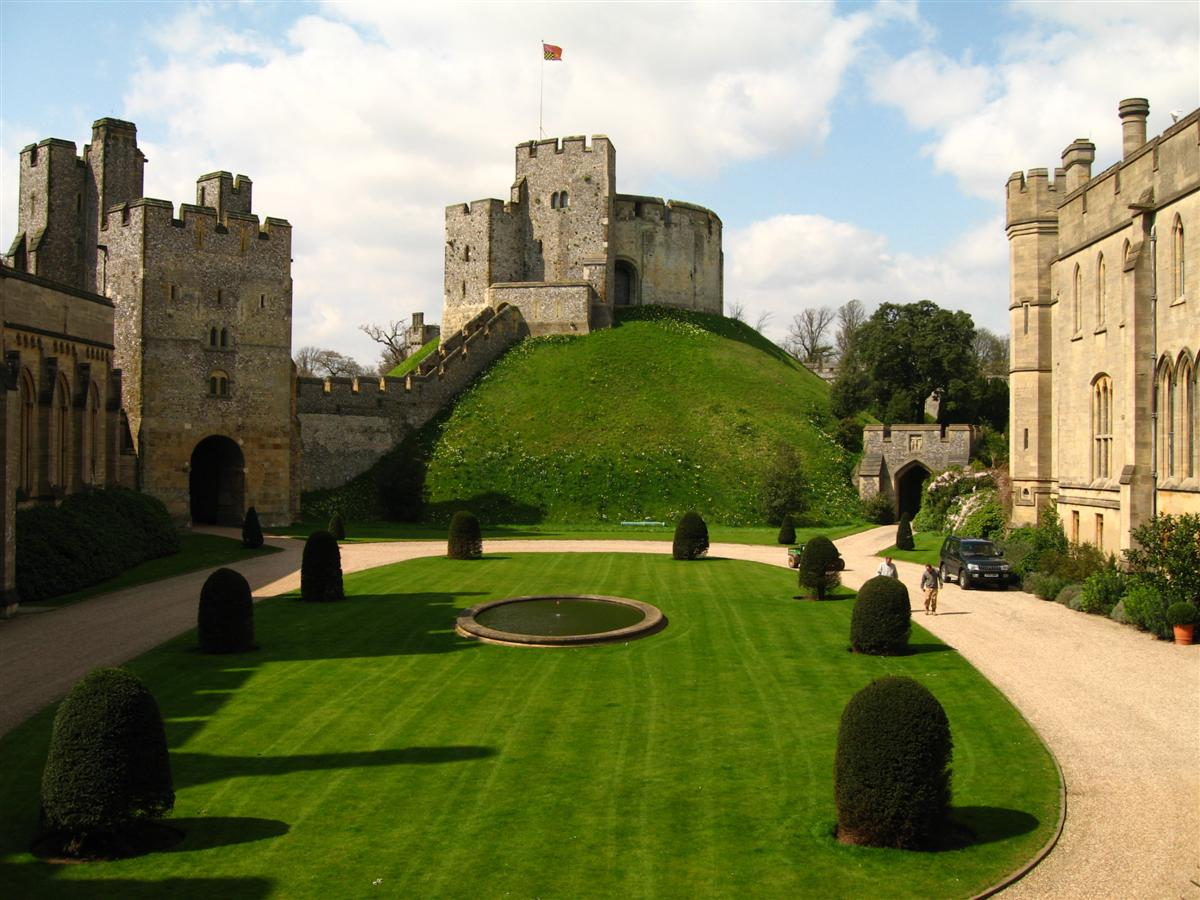
Arundel Castle

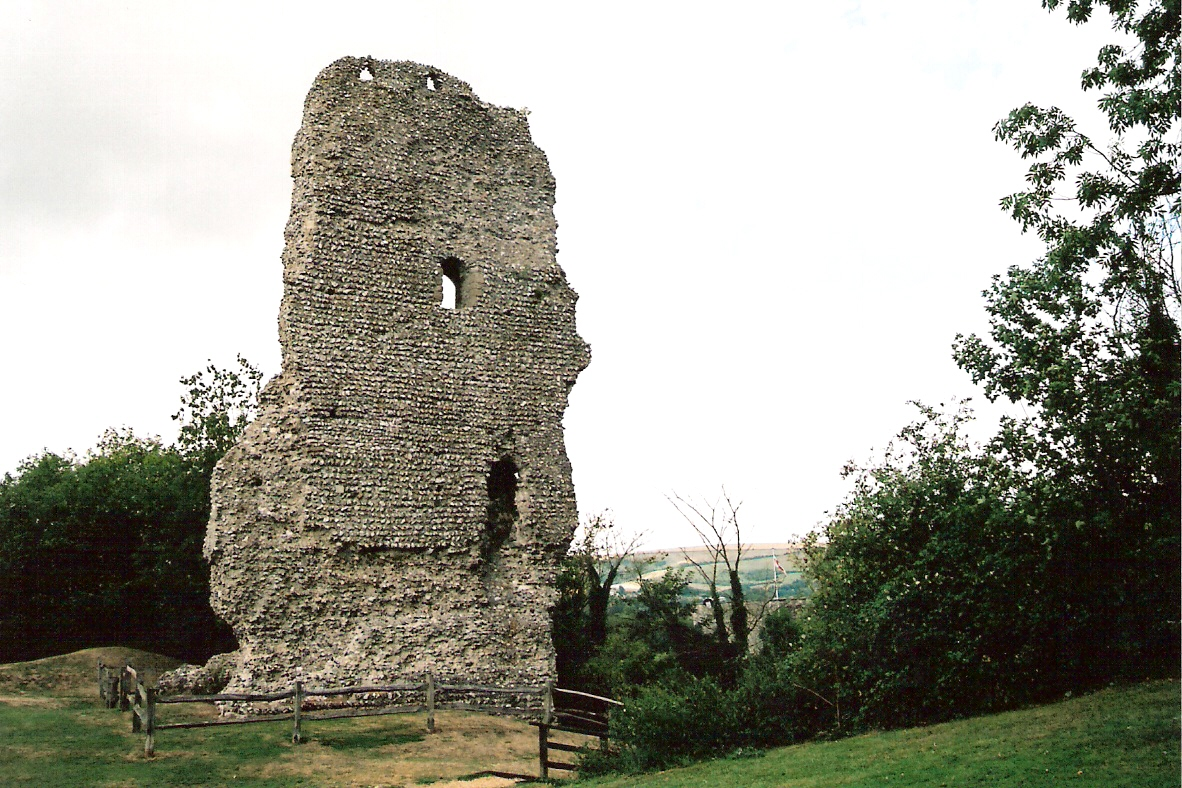
Bramber Castle

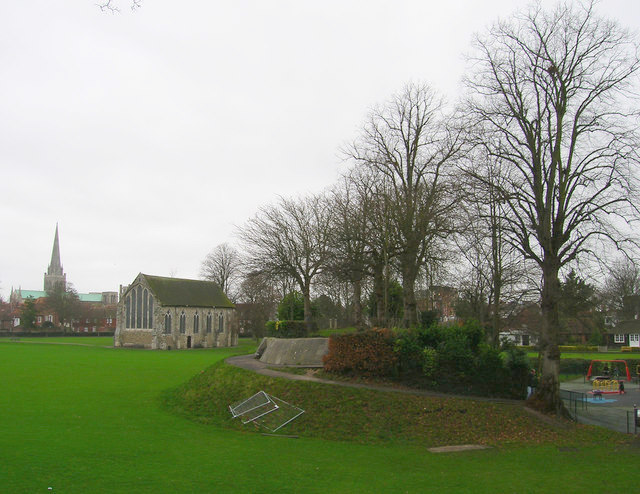
Chichester Castle

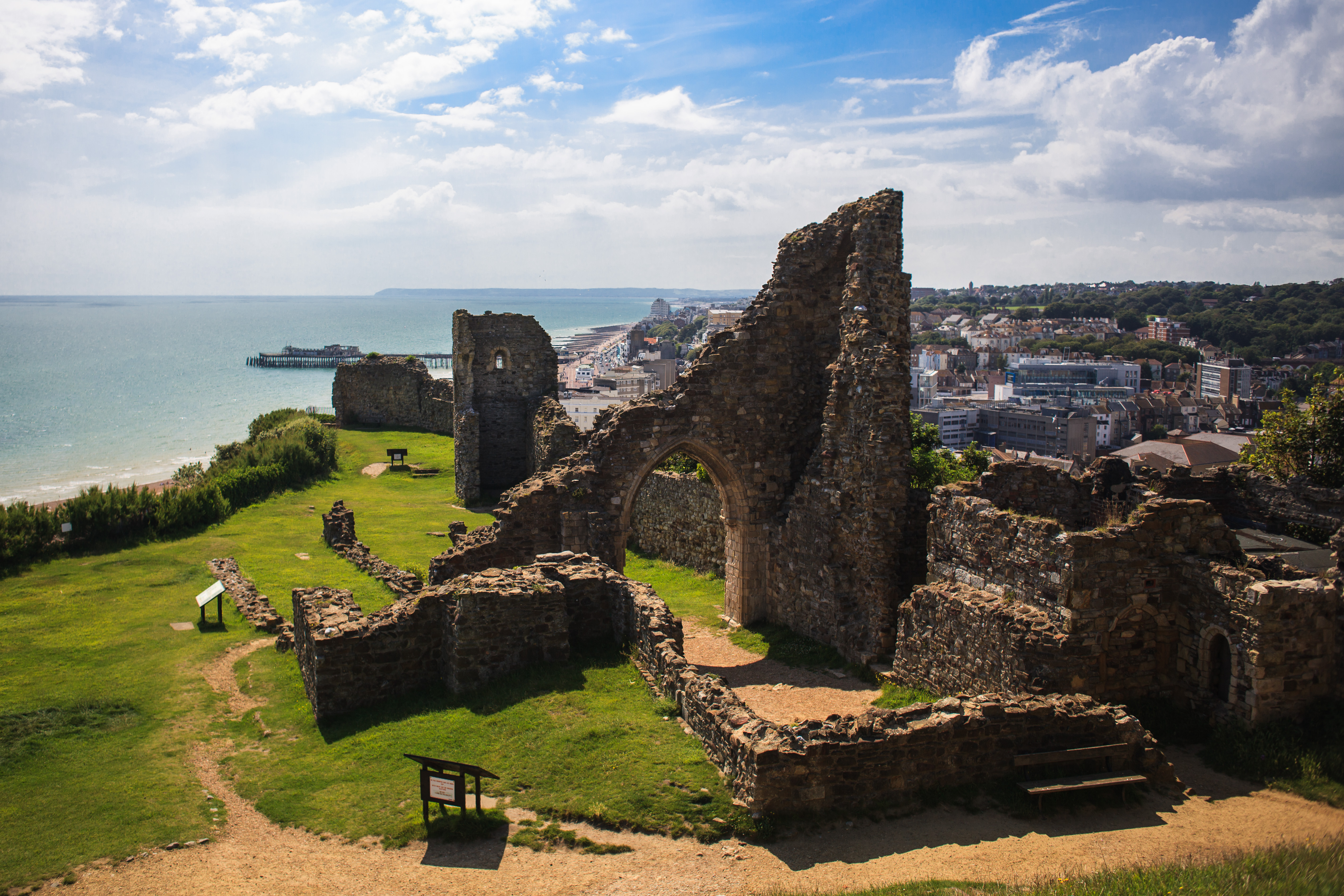
Hastings Castle

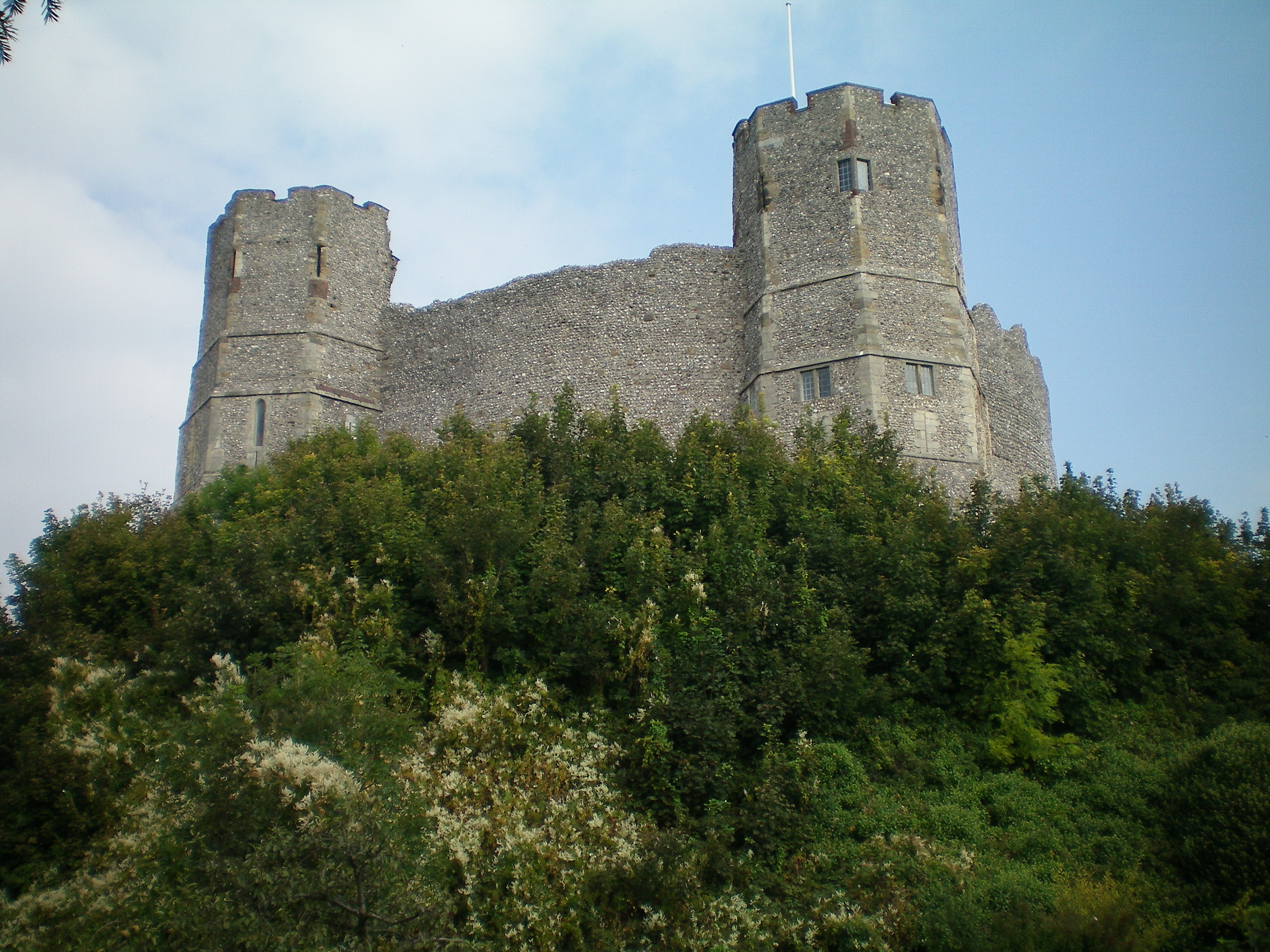
Lewes Castle

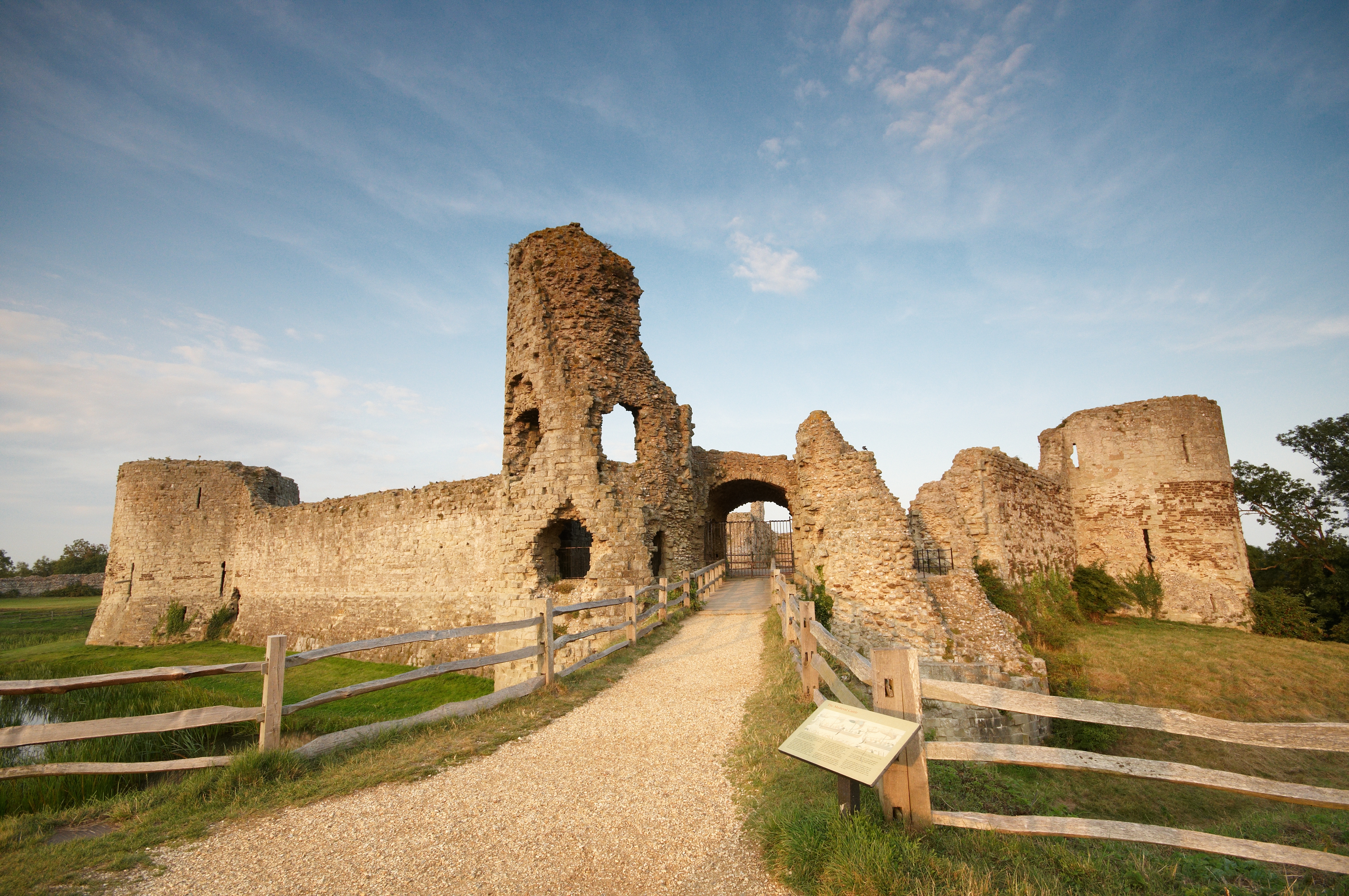
Pevensey Castle

== Geography ==
=== Subdivisions ===
Each Rape was subdivided into several hundreds and half hundreds. The half hundreds arose when the Rape of Bramber was created in the late 11th century where the new Rapal boundary divided a pre-existing hundred in two. This happened at East and West Easwrith, which was divided between the Rapes of Arundel and Bramber, and Fishersgate, which was divided between the Rapes of Bramber and Lewes. By the 19th century the Rapes were each subdivided for administrative purposes into two divisions. Each Rape had an upper division covering the northern, Wealden half of each Rape, and a lower division covering the southern, coastal half of each Rape.

=== Regional grouping ===
The Rapes may be grouped in regions, most commonly two geographic divisions within Sussex. The Rapes of Arundel, Bramber and Chichester comprised Sussex's western division; the Rapes of Hastings, Lewes and Pevensey comprised Sussex's eastern division. These divisions formed the basis of the areas administered by East and West Sussex County Councils and the non-metropolitan counties of East Sussex and West Sussex that were created in 1974 by the Local Government Act 1972.

== Symbolism ==
The six rapes are represented on the Sussex flag by six martlets

The six martlets on the Sussex flag and emblem represent the six Rapes, a design which goes back to at least the 17th century.

== See also ==
- History of local government in Sussex
- History of Sussex
- Lathe
- Parts of Lincolnshire
- Riding

== Cited works ==
- Grehan, John; Mace, Martin (2012). Battleground Sussex: a Military History of Sussex from the Iron Age to the Present Day. Casemate Publishers. ISBN 978-1848846616.
- Somerville, Maxwell (1894). Encyclopædia Britannica: a Dictionary of Arts, Science, and General Literature, Volume 22.
