= Chichester Castle =

Castle in the United Kingdom

- Chichester, West Sussex
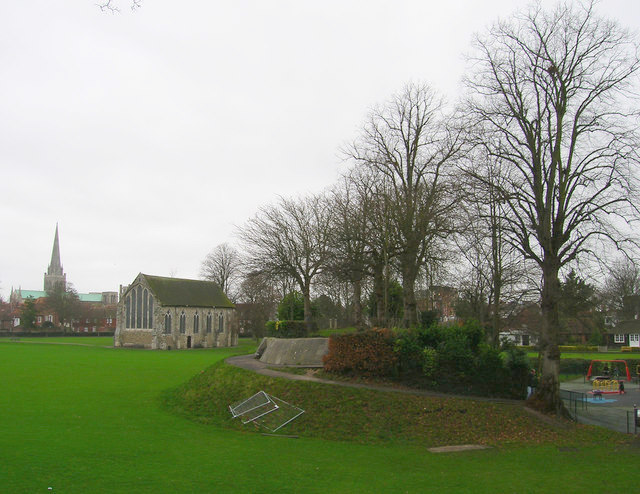
- Remnants of the castle motte

Site information
- Type: Norman

Location
- Shown within Chichester
- Coordinates: 50.839814°N 0.775799°W

Site history
- Built: 11th century
- Built by: Roger de Montgomery

Chichester Castle stood in the city of the same name in West Sussex (grid reference SU863052). Shortly after the Norman Conquest of England, Roger de Montgomery ordered the construction of a castle at Chichester. The castle at Chichester was one of 11 fortified sites to be established in Sussex before 1100. The Rape of Chichester, a subdivision of Sussex, was administered from the castle and was split off from the larger Rape of Arundel; a Rape was an administrative unit originating in the Saxon era and continued by the Normans. Situated in the north-east corner of Chichester, the castle was protected by the city walls. As it was an urban castle inserted into a pre-existing settlement, buildings were probably cleared to make way for the castle. Chichester Castle was of timber construction; although some timber castles were rebuilt in stone, there is no evidence that this was the case at Chichester.

Although the castle was originally built by the Earl of Shrewsbury, the Earls of Sussex owned it in the period 1154–1176, after which it passed into the possession of the Crown. Early in the 13th century, Chichester Castle was used as a court and jail. Chichester and Oxford Castle were two of the earliest urban castles to be used for this purpose, but gradually most urban castles were also used in this way.

In 1216, King John gave orders to destroy Chichester Castle. This was in the midst of the First Barons' War and around the time that Prince Louis of France landed in southern England with an army in support of the barons. John's orders were not acted on and the castle, along with many others in southern England, such as Reigate Castle in Surrey, was captured by the French. The castle was recaptured by the English in the spring of 1217, and the same year Henry III – who had succeeded John – ordered the castle's destruction. Between 1222 and 1269, Richard, 1st Earl of Cornwall, gave the site to the order of Greyfriars for their use as the site of a friary. The remains of the motte are still visible in Priory Park, Chichester; the motte is protected as a Scheduled Monument.

The castle ruins were excavated between 27 May and 3 June 2025.

== See also ==
- Noviomagus Reginorum – the Roman town of Chichester; the castle was situated in the northern part of the Roman military settlement
