= Rape of Arundel =

Traditional sub-divisions unique to the historic county of Sussex in England

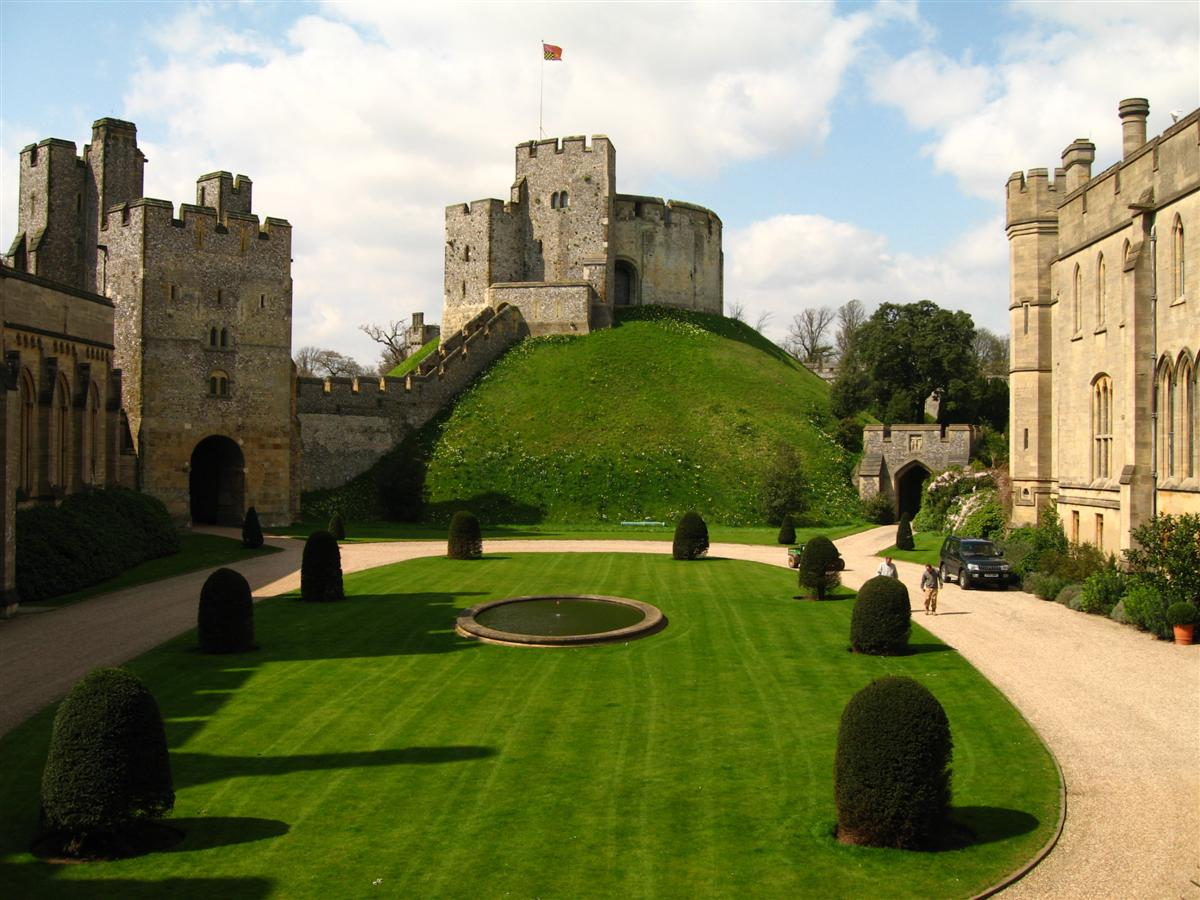
- The Norman Motte of Arundel Castle, once the administrative centre of the Rape

- The Rape of Arundel shown within Sussex
- Area
  - 1831: 132,800 acres (537 km^{2})
- Population
  - 1801: 22,478
  - 1811: 24,276
  - 1831: 31,064
- Density
  - 1831: 0.23 inhabitants per acre (57/km^{2})
- History
  - Created: 6th to 11th century
  - Succeeded by: Sussex (western division)
- Status: Rape (county subdivision)
  - HQ: Arundel
- Subdivisions
  - Type: Hundreds
  - Units: Avisford (named Binsted in 1086 but had its later name by 1166), Bury, Poling, Rotherbridge, West Easwrith

The Rape of Arundel (also known as Arundel Rape) is one of the rapes, the traditional sub-divisions unique to the historic county of Sussex in England.

The population of the rape of Arundel was 22,478 in 1801, falling to 24,276 in 1811.

== Location ==
The rape of Chichester lies to its west and the rape of Bramber lies to its east. To the north the rape is bounded by the county of Surrey and to the south by the English Channel. The rape of Arundel includes the towns of Arundel and Littlehampton. Its highest point is Glatting Beacon on the South Downs, which is 245 metres (804 ft) tall.

== Historical population ==
Population 1801–1831
Year	Pop.	±%
1801	22,478	—
1811	24,276	+8.0%
1821	28,615	+17.9%
1831	31,064	+8.6%

== Sub-divisions ==
The rape is traditionally divided into the following hundreds:

- Avisford (named Binsted in 1086 but had its later name by 1166)
- Bury
- Poling
- Rotherbridge
- West Easwrith

== See also ==
- History of Sussex
- List of hundreds of England and Wales
