= Lewes and Laughton Levels =

Park in Lewes, United Kingdom

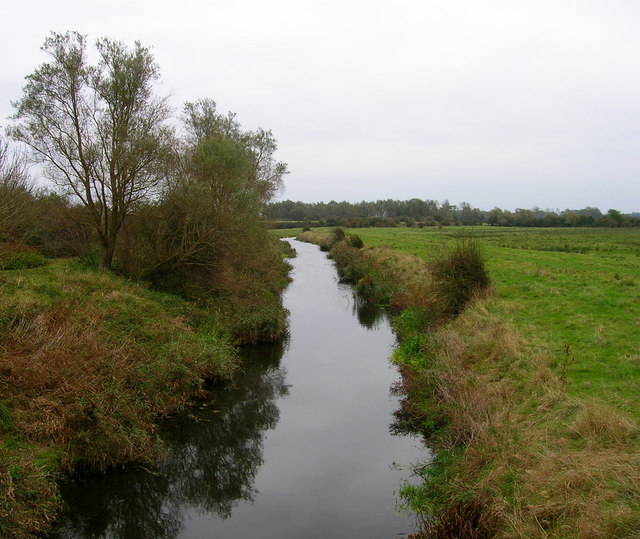
- Glynde Reach is the main drain for the Laughton Levels

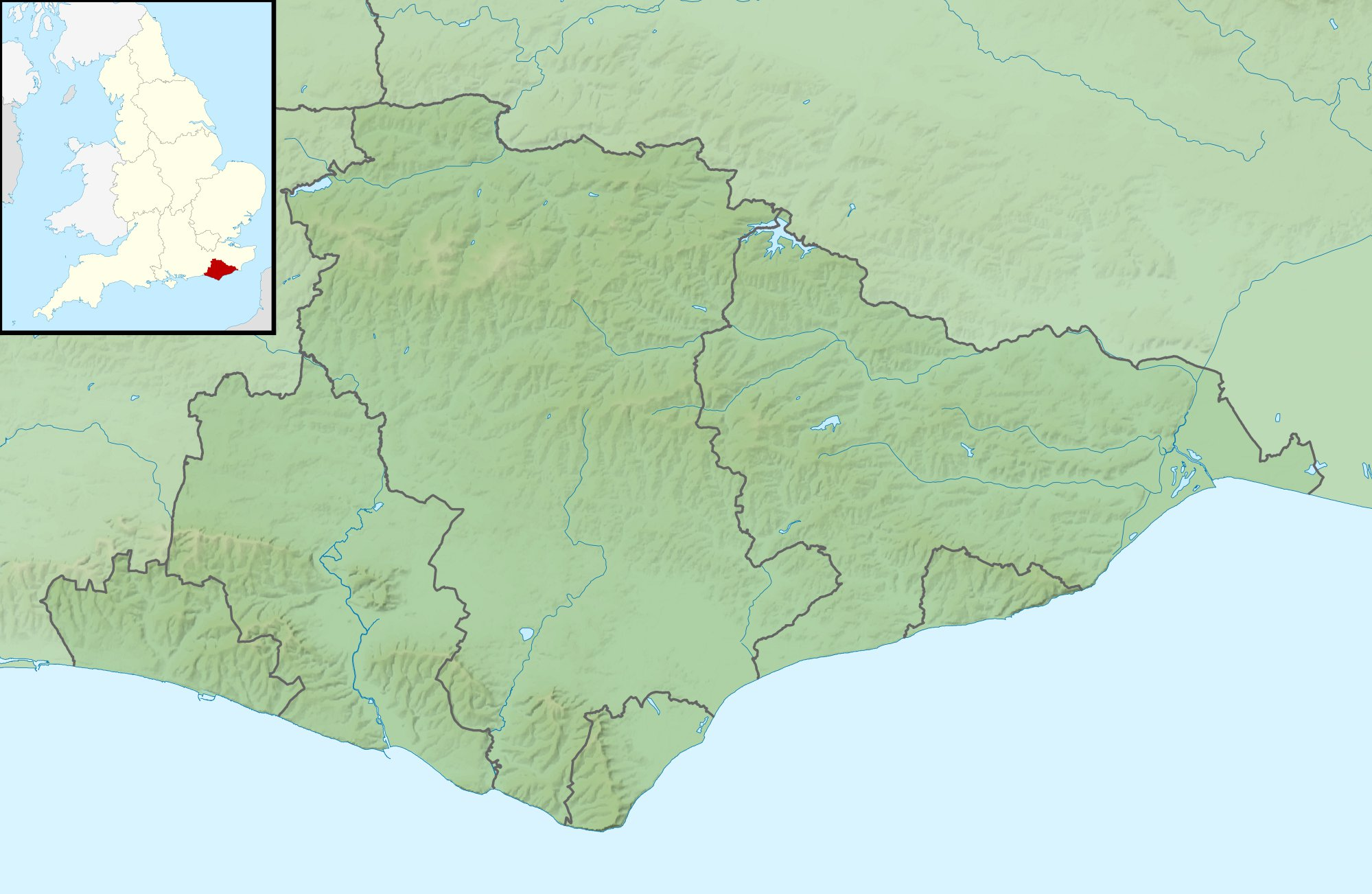
- Location within East Sussex
- Location: Lewes and Laughton in East Sussex
- OS grid: TQ435080
- Coordinates: 50°51′N 0°02′E
- Area: 6,000 acres (24 km^{2})

The Lewes and Laughton Levels are an area of low-lying land bordering the River Ouse near Lewes and the Glynde Reach near Laughton in East Sussex, England. The area was probably a tidal inlet in Norman times, but by the early 14th century, some meadows had been created by building embankments. Conditions deteriorated later that century, and by 1537, most of the meadows were permanently flooded. Part of the problem was the buildup of shingle across the mouth of the Ouse, but in 1537 a scot tax was raised, and a new channel cut through the shingle. By the mid 17th century, shingle was again preventing the region from draining properly, until the new channel was reinstated around 1731. In 1758 John Smeaton surveyed the area with a view to improving it for agriculture. He suggested straightening and widening the river channel, raising the banks around meadows, and building a large sluice near Piddinghoe, to keep the tides out. Some dredging and widening were carried out, but the straightending and sluice were discarded.

In 1788, William Jessop surveyed the whole river, with the main object of improving navigation. The Ouse above Lewes became the River Ouse Navigation, with 19 locks, and for the lower river, he suggested radical straightening, and removal of the shingle bar near the mouth of the river. The work was overseen by a Lewes schoolmaster and civil engineer, and was completed in 1795. Similar treatment of the Glynde Reach occurred between 1796 and 1803, and as well as enabling ships to reach Lewes, the faster moving tides drained the meadows much more effectively. Improvements continued in the early 19th century under the leadership of John Ellman, a renowned agriculturalist who became the Expenditor for the Lewes and Laughton Levels. Severe floods occurred in 1829, but the meadows drained within 48 hours.

Management of the flood defences for the Levels passed to the River Ouse Catchment Board in 1939, following the passing of the Land Drainage Act 1930. After three reorganisations and the subsequent privatisation of the water industry, responsibility passed to the Environment Agency, who suggested in 2012 that the land drainage functions should be managed by a local internal drainage board. Lewes District Council objected, and agreed to fund flood and coastal erosion management after the Environment Agency's internal drainage district for the Ouse was formally abolished from 31 March 2017.

== History ==
The Ouse valley in Sussex was almost certainly a tidal inlet in Norman times, for the Domesday Book of 1086 lists several salt works, which produced salt by evaporating sea water. Some were quite far inland, and such works were recorded at Laughton and Ripe on the Glynde. Other activities around the edges of the water included fishing and agriculture. By the early 14th century, some reclamation of the flood plain had taken place, with the construction of embankments to create fertile meadows, but the process was not without risk. The gradient on the lower Ouse, between Lewes and Newhaven, is just 6 inches per mile (0.1m per km) and changes in the relative levels of the land and sea, together with an increase in the number of storm tides, resulted in many of the meadows being submerged in winter by the later 14th century, and sometimes remaining flooded through the summer. Meadows at Beddingham were recorded as being flooded in the summer months for five years in the 1360s and three years in the 1380s, but were not flooded during the 1370s.

In the autumn of 1421, the Sussex coast was affected by a great flood, which also had serious consequences for the Netherlands. It appears that the valley was devastated by the event, as a Commission of Sewers was appointed in the spring of 1422. They were required to repair the banks and drainage between Seaford and Fletching, around 20 miles (32 km) inland. Records for the later part of the century are scarce, but it is recorded that some 400 acres (160 ha) of meadow at Southerham, just below Lewes, which belonged to the Archbishop of Canterbury, was turned into a fishery, known as the Brodewater. By the early 16th century, most of the drainage systems had failed. Lewes Priory held estates at Kingston, Iford and Southover on the southern edge of Lewes, but when the Dissolution of the Monasteries occurred in 1537, they were all listed as being under water for most of the year. This appears to have been the state of most of the levels at that time, with over 6,000 acres (24 km^{2}) affected. Such an area includes the valley of the Ouse as far upstream as Sheffield Bridge, and the Glynde Reach to Laughton, all of which had become an inland lake, suitable only for fowling and fishing.

Part of the problem of flooding was caused by longshore drift creating a huge shingle bar across the outlet of the river, which had gradually moved eastwards to Seaford, some 2 miles (3.2 km) from its position in Roman times. This restricted both the rate at which water drained from the river, and the ease with which boats could reach the river from the sea. One possible solution was to dig a new channel through the bar, near the position of the original outlet. The Prior of Lewes and some gentlemen of the area sought help from two Dutch drainage engineers and the engineer who had succeeded in reclaiming St Katherine's Marsh near the Tower of London. In 1537, they levied a scot tax on all those who had lands which were likely to flood, and the work on the new channel was completed, probably by 1539. The following year, a number of sluices along the Ouse were replaced, after they had been damaged maliciously. The improved drainage provided by the new outfall meant that cattle could be grazed on the Levels, and the Brodewater reverted to being a meadow.

The improved conditions lasted until the early 17th century, but by 1648 the outlet was again clogged by shingle, which impeded both drainage and shipping. At some time between 1676 and the publication of an Admiralty chart in 1698, the river flowed along the back of the shingle bar and broke through into the sea about 0.5 miles (0.8 km) further to the east, at the site of a tide mill. The outlet at Newhaven had again been reinstated by 1731, when the engineer John Reynolds carried out surveys and work for the Newhaven Harbour Commissioners, created by an Act of Parliament obtained that same year. Between 1731 and 1733 Reynolds was also employed by the Drainage Commissioners to construct a sluice across the river at Piddinghoe. It was designed to hold back the water in the river, so that it could be released at low tide to scour the channel, but it was short-lived, as it was damaged in 1736, and removed rather than repaired.

=== Smeaton's survey ===
The Commissioners for the Lewes and Laughton Levels employed the engineer John Smeaton to survey the river, in order to improve the drainage of the levels. He visited the area for four days in June 1767, during a period which was halfway between spring tides and neap tides, and which followed a time when the weather had been quite wet. He found that the meadows, which were locally known as brooks, were in many cases under water, but that their condition, and therefore the remedies that would be required, were variable. In particular, the brooks of Southover, Iford, Pool Bar, and Rodmell, which he called the West Levels, were badly affected as their embankments were low and poorly maintained. At high tide, the level of the river was above that in the meadows. The same applied to Ranscombe brooks, to the north of the junction between the Ouse and the Glynde, Further down river, at White Wall and Tarring, the brooks were generally dry, which he attributed to the land surface being higher, the walls being higher and well maintained, and the outfall sluices from the meadows being arranged at a lower level in relation to the river.

He noted that the rise and fall of the tide below Broad Salts, a little below Piddinghoe, was some 8 feet (2.4 m), but this was reduced to just 6 inches (15 cm) at the mouth of the Glynde, and was barely visible at Lewes Bridge. A series of shoals, combined with the narrow and winding channel, held water back, and prevented it from draining from the levels. He also commented on the great shingle bar crossing the mouth of the river at Newhaven, which if removed would allow the water levels to be around 6.5 feet (2.0 m) lower at low tide. The brooks above Lewes Bridge became gradually drier as he progressed towards Barcombe Mill, but with almost no fall on the river, its winding course and numerous shoals did little to assist the drainage of the meadows. The brooks bordering the Glynde, to the east of Ranscombe, were generally at a higher level, but were affected by stagnant water lying on the surface. There was again no gradient on the river, which followed a winding course, but he was confident that if the drainage of Ranscombe could be solved, the drainage of the Laughton Levels would also be.

He proposed two methods to achieve the drainage of the levels. The first was to straighten the river, to remove all of the obstructions, and to construct an outfall sluice, to prevent the tides entering the river. The brooks on the west level and at Ranscombe would need better embankments, and adequate sluices to allow water to drain away when required. The second method involved raising the banks on all of the meadows, and constructing a separate sewer to carry surplus water from them to the sea. A sluice near the sea would prevent tides entering the sewer, but the main river would be left largely unaltered. His outfall sluice would have been constructed at Tarring Tenantry, on a new channel which bypassed Piddinghoe shoal. It would contain three openings, two of 13 feet (4.0 m), each with a set of pointed doors pointing in opposite directions, to prevent the sea entering the river, and to retain water in the river during dry periods. The third opening would be 14 feet (4.3 m) wide, with double pointed doors facing in both directions, so that it could additionally be used as a navigation lock at all states of the tide and river. Once the work was completed, a dam would be constructed to close the old channel at Piddinghoe.

He estimated the cost of the first scheme to be £10,800, and of the second to be £13,061. The Commissioners implemented some of his suggestions, improving the channels below Lewes in 1768, by dredging to remove shoals and making the channel wider in places. However, they did little to straighten the river, and Smeaton's great sluice was not constructed.

=== Jessop's contribution ===
The next advance took place in 1788, when William Jessop was asked to survey the river, with a view to extending navigation. His plan to canalise the river upwards from Lewes was embodied in an Act of Parliament obtained in 1790, which created the Company of Proprietors of the River Ouse Navigation to manage that project. He also recognised that navigation between Lewes and Newhaven was only possible when there were spring tides, and proposed making the channel wider, deeper and straighter to rectify this. The work would include 1,000 yards (910 m) of new cut, to resolve the worst of the meanders, and a second Act of Parliament created the Lower Ouse Navigation Company in 1791. The Trustees of the Company worked with the Commissioners of the Lewes and Laughton Levels, and the project was jointly funded by tolls for using the river and by a drainage tax on owners of land in the five districts into which the levels were split. There were provisions to ensure that the relative rates of tolls and taxes remained in step, but the taxes proved to be too onerous, and a subsequent Act was obtained in 1800 to alter the balance.

A Lewes schoolmaster and civil engineer called Cater Rand was employed as the resident engineer, and managed a team of several hundred navvies, who worked on the channel from Lewes down to Southease. This work was completed by February 1795, and in October, the tides flowed up to Lewes Bridge. Unfortunately, the salt water killed fish and polluted a number of wells, but the scheme was generally successful, with the faster-moving water scouring the channel at Newhaven and draining the levels more efficiently. Work to improve Glynde Reach took place from 1786 to 1803, resulting in better drainage for Ranscombe Brooks and Laughton Levels, although there were complaints from a group of chair-bottomers, whose source of reeds to make chair seats dried up.

=== Development ===
In 1780, John Ellman inherited the tenancy of Place Farm in Glynde from his father. Of its 580 acres (230 ha), some 200 acres (81 ha) was brookland, situated on the Laughton Levels, and although he knew that his education was lacking, he understood the importance of keeping accounts, a practice which his father had also kept. Ellman is best known for his agricultural achievements, particularly the improvement of the Southdown sheep breed, but he became part of the jury for the Commissioners of the Lewes and Laughton Levels in 1780, and its Expenditor in 1783. While this role traditionally involved supervising the collection of the water scot tax and its expenditure, Ellman worked tirelessly to organise and supervise work carried out on the Glynde Reach and in the valley. He produced estimates for the improvements, and while his contribution to the drainage and navigation of the Ouse is not fully understood, due to the fragmentary nature of the evidence, it appears to have been considerable. He supervised further work on the main channel to Newhaven, which enabled a 120-ton ship to unload stone at Lewes Bridge in the late 1820s. He retired from farming and the Commissioners in 1828, but the benefit of the work was demonstrated in April 1829, when although severe flooding occurred on the river below Lewes, the meadows had drained within 48 hours.

The Commissioners continued to manage the levels until the 1930s, when the first comprehensive legislation covering land drainage was introduced with the passing of the Land Drainage Act 1930. Under the act, the commissioners effectively became an internal drainage board, until a new structure could be set up in accordance with part 2 of the act. This occurred in 1939, when the Commissioners were abolished, to be replaced by the River Ouse Catchment Board (internal drainage). Serious flooding occurred at Lewes and Malling in 1960, and a further round of raising the banks and widening the channel occurred between Newhaven and Lewes. Gravity drainage of some parts of the levels has proved ineffective, and by 1991 water from Rodmell and Ranscombe Brooks was being pumped into the river. All of the streams entering the river from the brooklands are fitted with tidal flaps, which prevent saltwater from entering the agricultural land. Tidal water has been unable to enter the Laughton Level since 1973, when a dam and pumping station was constructed across the channel at Beddingham. There are now land drainage pumping stations at Stoneham, Offham, Rodmell, ET Wadham, Ranscombe, Denton and Beddingham, with an eighth station at Lewes which pumps water into the Malling Drain.

Because the land drainage functions of the River Ouse district were managed by a catchment board, rather than a separate internal drainage board, they passed to the East Sussex River Board, the Sussex River Authority, and the Southern Water Authority through the successive reorganisations of the water industry, and then passed to the National Rivers Authority when the water companies were privatised in 1989. The Environment Agency took over responsibility for the River Ouse Internal Drainage District (IDD) when it was created in 1995, along with five other IDDs in Sussex. In 2012, they decided that locally accountable bodies would be better at performing these functions, and consulted local authorities as to how best this could be achieved. Lewes District Council, who contributed £131,000 annually for the work of the IDD, opposed the setting up of an independent internal drainage board. East Sussex County Council were initially concerned that this might result in them bearing additional costs as the Local Flood Authority, but Lewes Council stated that they would use any savings made from not supporting an internal drainage board to fund flood and coastal erosion management. Subsequently, The River Ouse (Sussex) Internal Drainage District Order 2016 was passed by Parliament on 18 July 2016, which abolished the River Ouse Internal Drainage District as from 31 March 2017, without creating a formal body to replace it.

== Bibliography ==
- Brandon, P. F. (1971). "The Origin of Newhaven and the Drainage of the Lewes and Laughton Levels". Sussex Archaeological Collections. 109: 94–106. doi:10.5284/1086029.
- Brent, Colin (1993). Georgian Lewes 1714-1830: The Heyday of a Country Town. Colin Brent Books. ISBN 978-0-9522423-0-7.
- Farrant, Sue (2008). John Ellman of Glynde in Sussex (PDF). British Agricultural History Society. Archived (PDF) from the original on 21 April 2018.
- Hadfield, Charles (1969). The Canals of South and South East England. David and Charles. ISBN 978-0-7153-4693-8.
- NRA (October 1991). "The River Ouse" (PDF). National Rivers Authority. Archived (PDF) from the original on 23 April 2018.
- Priestley, Joseph (1831). "Historical Account of the Navigable Rivers, Canals and Railways of Great Britain". Archived from the original on 3 March 2016.
- Robinson, D A; Williams, R B G (1983). "Chapter 3. The Sussex Coast Past and Present". In Sutton, Alan (ed.). Sussex: Environment, Landscape and Society (PDF). Sussex University. Archived (PDF) from the original on 12 July 2018.
- Smeaton, John (1812). Miscellaneous Papers of John Smeaton. Longman, Hurst, Rees, Orme and Brown.
- Skempton, Sir Alec; et al. (2002). A Biographical Dictionary of Civil Engineers in Great Britain and Ireland: Vol 1: 1500 to 1830. Thomas Telford. ISBN 978-0-7277-2939-2.
