= Mount Caburn =

Hill in Sussex, England

Coordinates: 50°51′43″N 0°3′3″E

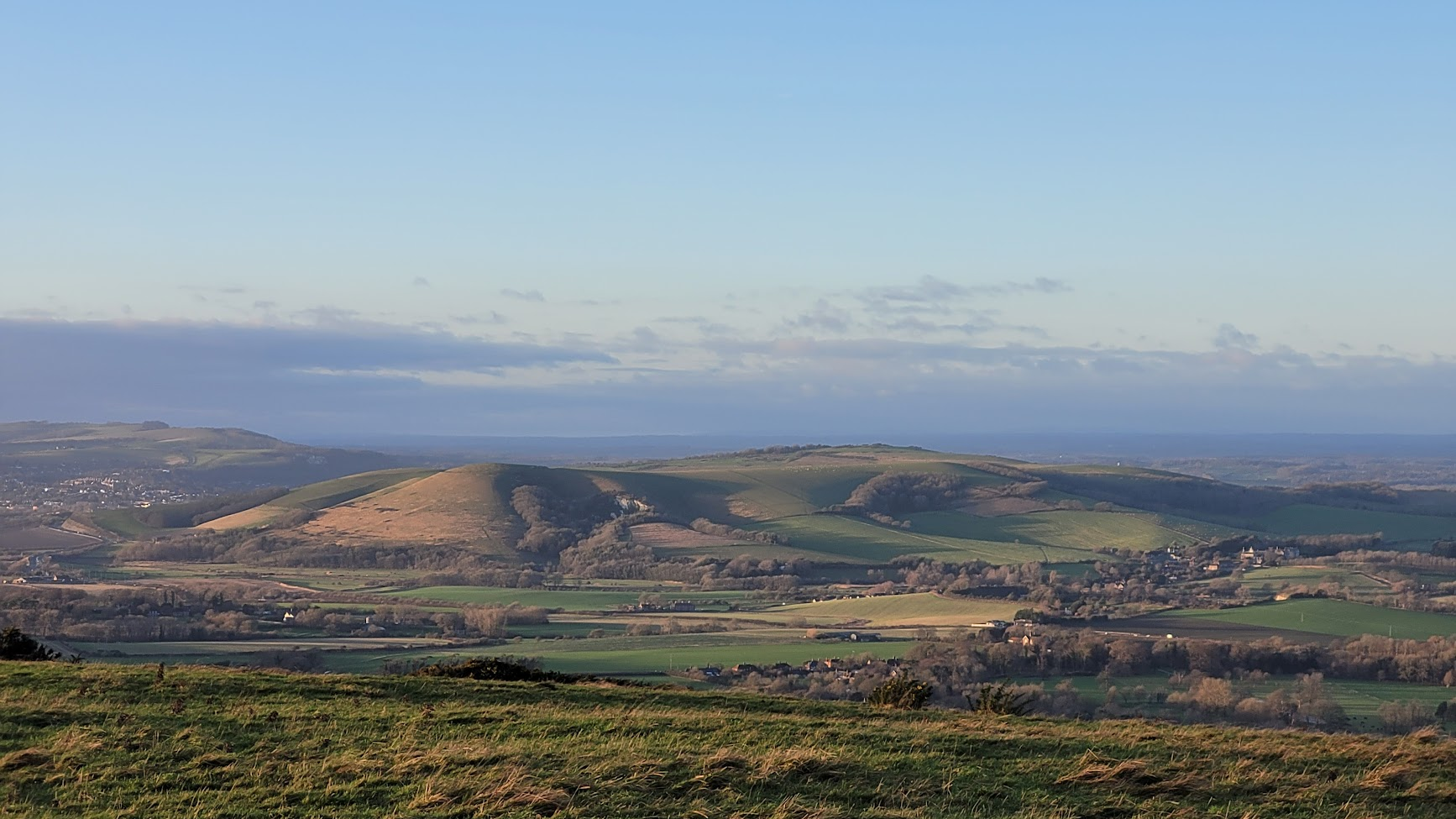
- Mount Caburn and its surroundings, including Lewes, taken from Firle Beacon, 28 December 2021.

Highest point
- Elevation: 150 m (490 ft)

Geography
- Location: Glynde, East Sussex, England
- Parent range: South Downs
- OS grid: TQ 44429 08911
- Topo map: OS Landranger 198, Explorer 11, 25

Mount Caburn is a 150-metre (492 ft) prominent landmark in East Sussex, England, about one mile (1.6 km) east of Lewes overlooking the village of Glynde. It is the highest part of an outlier of the South Downs, separated from the main range by Glynde Reach, a tributary of the River Ouse.

== Enclosure ==
On the summit of Caburn are the remains of an Iron Age hill fort. The hill fort has been repeatedly excavated, by Augustus Pitt Rivers from 1877 to 1878, the Curwens from 1925 to 1926, and again from 1937 to 1938, and the Sussex Archaeological Society from 1996 to 1998. It may have the most excavations per site in Britain, with 170 trenches.

Pollen records (from peat at the southern base) indicate that prior to 2000 BC the hill was covered with dark yew woodlands. The fact that a single Neolithic leaf-shaped arrowhead is the only pre-Bronze Age find on Caburn, despite the extent and duration of excavations, suggests that there was little permanent occupation then.

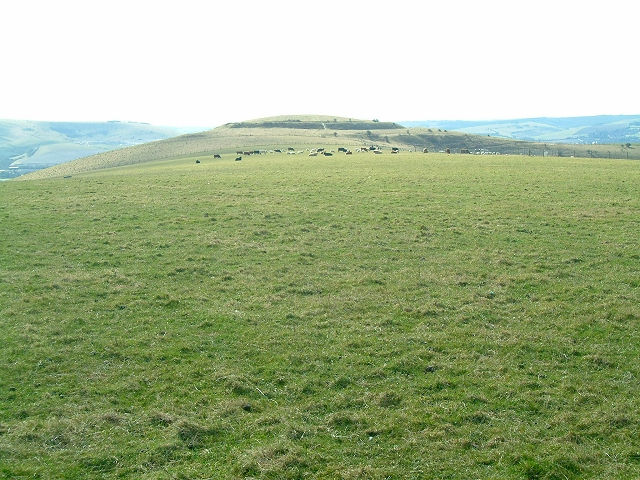
The Iron Age earthworks on Mount Caburn are most clearly visible from the north, as in this picture

The summit was initially enclosed in the middle Iron Age (c. 400 BC), with a deep V-shaped ditch and a bank of dumped spoil. Originally the ditch was 8m wide at the top, 2.7m deep, and enclosed an area of 1.9 ha.

Since before the first excavations, it has been assumed that this enclosure was defensive, making a conventional hill fort. However the most recent excavators have challenged this assumption, arguing instead that the site was a religious enclosure, rather than a military fort or fortified farmstead. They point to the contents of the small pits, the insubstantial rampart, and its weak defensive attributes.

There are over 140 burial pits on Caburn: some are circular, some triangular and some rectangular. Each pit was found to be full of artefacts. Deposits included weapons, tools, pottery, coins, querns, and disarticulated human and animal bones. The most recent excavators argue that these are not random, or mere domestic rubbish, but are structured deposits and appear "ritually charged". The NE corner of the enclosure seemed to have special significance, because the high-status objects were mostly deposited there.

Outside the original rampart, on the northern side, there is a great ditch cut into the chalk. This is the side most vulnerable to attack.

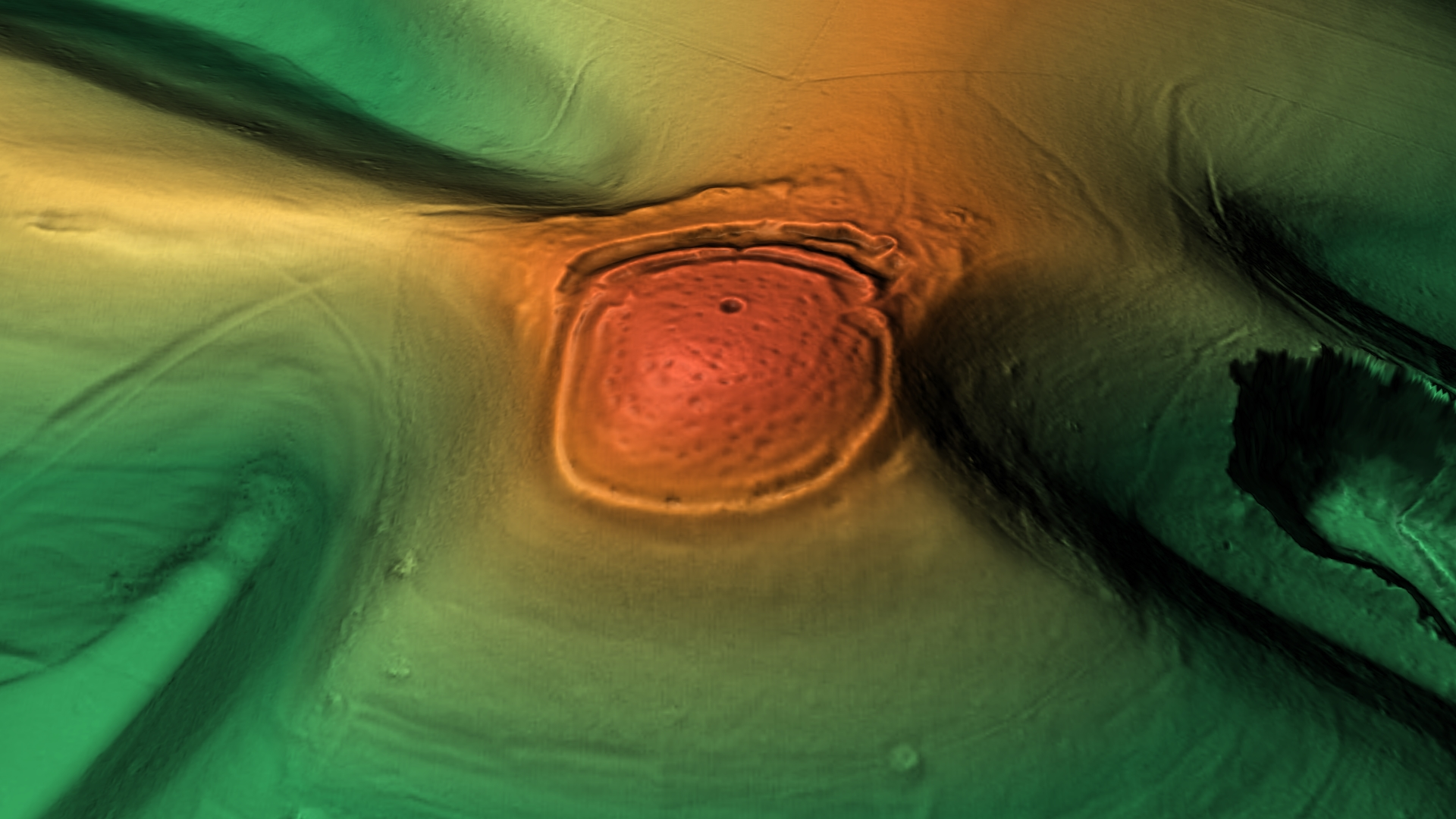
3D view of the digital terrain model

This outer ditch has long been assumed to be a late Iron Age (re-)fortification, perhaps in response to the threat from Rome. That assumption has now been disproved. The excavation of trenches through the chalk dump (the spoil had been dumped in the adjacent valley instead of being used to build a bank) and a small internal bank turned up Romano-British pottery. Therefore, the outer ditch is Romano-British or later, perhaps a Saxon measure against Viking raids.

== Use ==
Caburn has only been reoccupied sporadically since the great northern ditch was built, at the Norman Conquest and during Stephen's reign.

It appears that the Caburn was densely grazed during the Roman period, when the hill slopes around were a patchwork of rectangular ploughed fields. Then the hill probably returned to scrub, but by the Norman Conquest the Caburn was heavily grazed again and the hill slopes were ploughed into strips. Both the Roman rectangular fields and the medieval strips are still visible today.

Over later centuries the dominant agricultural activity became sheep grazing. It was on Caburn and other local pastures that John Ellman reared his famous breed of Southdown sheep.

During the Second World War two slit trenches and a three-sided Bren position were dug into Caburn as part of a 'stop-line' to defend against invasion.

== Conservation and recreation ==
Mount Caburn is now legally protected. It lies within the Lewes Downs SSSI (designated in 1953) and the Mount Caburn National Nature Reserve was established in the mid-1980s. It has been designated a Special Area of Conservation as an example of orchid-rich chalk grassland. It is home to a good population of European stonechats.

Caburn is unusual within the South Downs for having a south-facing scarp slope. The site has the largest British population of burnt-tip orchid. There is also the rare small-leaved sweet-briar, and the typical fragrant and pyramidal orchids. Invertebrates include Adonis and chalkhill blue butterflies and the scarce forester moth. Populations of European stonechats live in scrubby bushes such as gorse near the golf club and in the valley below, along with other song birds such as blue tits. Herring gulls and carrion crows often fly overhead and hundreds of domestic sheep graze the area. There is a sheltered cave with a water trough where lost sheep can rest safely if they stray away from the flock on a dark night when the farmer is rounding up the animals.

== Arts ==
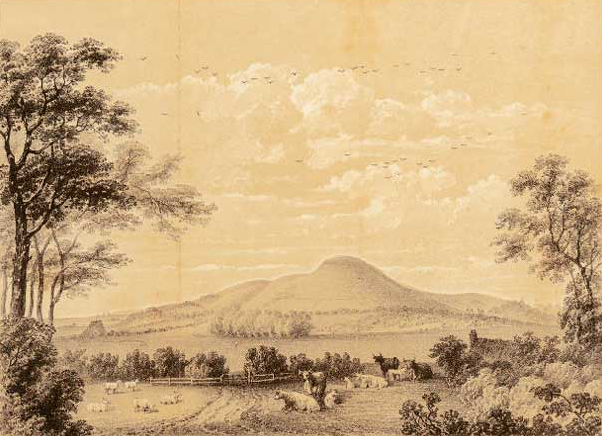
The Caburn by J. Lambert, 1783

In fiction Caburn appears as Wealden Hill in the novel of the same name by Graeme K Talboys. Caburn also features prominently in the novels and short stories of John Whitbourn (e.g. The Royal Changeling and Bury My Heart At Southerham (East Sussex)). Caburn also appears in the children's story Elsie Piddock Skips in Her Sleep (first published in 1937) by Eleanor Farjeon. It is mentioned in Kipling's poem "The Run of the Downs."

== Name ==
The hill has only been called Mount Caburn since the end of the 18th century. The origins of the name are disputed.

- The likely etymology of the hill is from the Old English 'Calde burgh' or 'Cold Fort' in 1296, which later became 'Mount Carbone' in the late 18th century.
- It has also been suggested that Caburn may come from the Welsh 'Caer Bryn' or 'Stronghold hill', yet this is unlikely and widely discredited.
- Some local accounts allege that by the 18th century it was called Carber, and before that it was called Calborough Hill.
