= Glynde Reach =

River in East Sussex, England

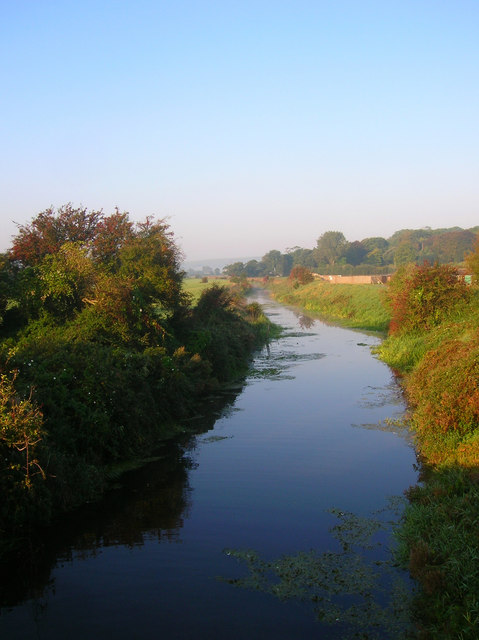
- Glynde Reach near Glynde

Location
- Country: England
- County: East Sussex
- Villages: Beddingham, Glynde, Ringmer, Laughton, Ripe, Selmeston

Physical characteristics
- Source
  - location: Selmeston, East Sussex, UK
  - coordinates: 50.843594°N 0.140326°E
- Mouth: River Ouse
  - location: UK
  - coordinates: 50.847698°N 0.038201°E
- Length: 7.75 mi (12.47 km)

Glynde Reach is a river in East Sussex, England and tributary of the River Ouse. The main channel is fed from sources near Laughton, Rushy Green on the outskirts of Ringmer, two streams near Selmeston and several near Ripe.

== History ==
Glynde Reach and the River Ouse were almost certainly a tidal inlet at the time the Domesday Book was produced in 1086. The main industry was the production of salt by the evaporation of sea water, and salt works were recorded at Ripe and Laughton. During the early 14th century, meadows were created on parts of the flood plain by building embankments, but conditions worsened later in the century. Meadows at Beddingham were flooded in the summer for five years in the 1360s and three in the 1380s, but not at all in the 1370s. The state of the land was affected by the state of the Ouse, and reductions in the volume of water to scour the main outlet at Newhaven as a result of the embanking resulted in a large shingle bar forming, and the mouth moving eastwards to Seaford. Consequently, conditions on the floodplain, known as the Lewes and Laughton Levels, worsened. Some 400 acres (160 ha) of meadow owned by the Archbishop of Canterbury near the junction of the Glynde Reach and the Ouse became a permanent fishery called the Brodewater in the 15th century.

In 1537, after the Prior of Lewes and various riparian landowners had consulted with Dutch drainage engineers, the Commissioners of the Levels raised a water scot, levied on all whose land was threatened by flooding, and by 1539 had cut a new outlet channel for the River Ouse through the shingle bank at Newhaven. The improved drainage benefitted the levels, enabling the Archbishop of Canterbury's Brodewater to revert to meadow, and it was still in use as such in 1616. Conditions worsened later in the 17th century, again connected with the deteriorating outlet to the Ouse, and so the Commissioners for the Levels employed the engineer John Smeaton to carry out a survey and recommend solutions. He visited the area on four days in June 1767, after a period of wet weather, to inspect the meadow lands, locally known as brooks. He found that the brooks at Ranscombe, near the junction between Glynde Reach and the Ouse, in common with those to the west of the Ouse, had low and poorly maintained embankments, and at high tide, the water level in the river was above the levels of the meadows. To the east of Ranscombe, the brooks bordering Glynde Reach were generally at a higher level, but were affected by stagnant water lying on the surface. He attributed this to the fact that there was no gradient on the river, which followed a winding course, and was confident that if the issues at Ranscombe could be resolved, those on the Glynde would also be.

He proposed that the River Ouse should be straightened, that embankments should be raised at Ranscombe and to the west of the Ouse, and that a huge sluice should be constructed on the Ouse at Piddinghoe, to prevent tides from entering the river system. By 1768, the Commissioners had implemented some of Smeaton's suggestions, widening the Ouse below Lewes and dredging it to remove the worst shoals, but they did little to straighten the river, and his great sluice was not constructed.

=== Development ===
The next great advance came not as a result of land drainage proposals, but from an attempt to make the Ouse navigable. William Jessop surveyed the Ouse with this in mind in 1768, and made two proposals. The Ouse would be made navigable above Lewes, almost to its source, by constructing locks and weirs. Below Lewes, he proposed radical reworking of the channel, to make it straighter, deeper and wider. This second proposal was authorised by an Act of Parliament obtained in 1791, and responsibility for the work was shared between a new body of Trustees for the river and the Commissioners of the Lewes and Laughton Levels. It would be funded by tolls for using the river, and by drainage rates for those who owned land on the levels. The balance between tolls and rates was too onerous for the landowners, and a second Act was obtained in 1800 to adjust them. The project was managed by a Lewes schoolmaster and civil engineer called Cater Rand, who employed a team of several hundred navvies. Work on the Ouse was completed by 1795, and from 1796 to 1803 they tackled the Glynde Reach. The faster-moving water in the rivers and its scouring effect on the mouth of the Ouse meant that drainage was significantly improved. Ranscombe Brooks and the Laughton Levels could again be used for agriculture, although there were complaints from a group of chair-bottomers, who lost their source of reeds to make chair seats.

From 1783 until his retirement in 1828, the Expenditor for the Lewes and Laughton Levels was John Ellman, better known for his agricultural achievements, particularly the improvement of the Southdown sheep breed. He worked tirelessly to organise and supervise work carried out on the Glynde Reach and in the valley, where part of his farm was located on the levels. Such improvements reduced the incidence of flooding, and improved the draining of the land if such an event occurred. In 1973 a dam and pumping station was constructed across the channel at Beddingham, to prevent tidal water from entering the Laughton Level completely.

== Water quality ==
The Environment Agency measure the water quality of the river systems in England. Each is given an overall ecological status, which may be one of five levels: high, good, moderate, poor and bad. There are several components that are used to determine this, including biological status, which looks at the quantity and varieties of invertebrates, angiosperms and fish. Chemical status, which compares the concentrations of various chemicals against known safe concentrations, is rated good or fail.

The water quality of Glynde Reach was as follows in 2019.

Section	Ecological Status	Chemical Status	Length	Catchment
Glynde Reach	Poor	Fail	8.0 miles (12.9 km)	21.82 square miles (56.5 km^{2})

Reasons for the water quality being less than good include physical modification of the channel, discharge from sewage treatment works and runoff from agricultural land. Although still poor, the quality has improved since 2016, when it was rated bad. Like most rivers in the UK, the chemical status changed from good to fail in 2019, due to the presence of polybrominated diphenyl ethers (PBDE), perfluorooctane sulphonate (PFOS) and mercury compounds, none of which had previously been included in the assessment.

== Bibliography ==
- Bamber, Judith; Smith, Helena (2003). The Rough Guide to Walks in London and Southeast England. Rough Guides. ISBN 978-1-85828-938-0.
- Brandon, P. F. (1971). "The Origin of Newhaven and the Drainage of the Lewes and Laughton Levels". Sussex Archaeological Collections. 109: 94–106. doi:10.5284/1086029.
- Brent, Colin (1993). Georgian Lewes 1714-1830: The Heyday of a Country Town. Colin Brent Books. ISBN 978-0-9522423-0-7.
- Chantler, Bob; Chantler, Chris (2013). Kent & East Sussex River Walks. Amazon for Kindle.
- Farrant, Sue (2008). John Ellman of Glynde in Sussex (PDF). British Agricultural History Society. Archived (PDF) from the original on 21 April 2018.
- Hadfield, Charles (1969). The Canals of South and South East England. David and Charles. ISBN 978-0-7153-4693-8.
- NRA (October 1991). "The River Ouse" (PDF). National Rivers Authority. Archived (PDF) from the original on 23 April 2018.
- Priestley, Joseph (1831). "Historical Account of the Navigable Rivers, Canals and Railways of Great Britain". Archived from the original on 3 March 2016.
- Robinson, D A; Williams, R B G (1983). "Chapter 3. The Sussex Coast Past and Present". In Sutton, Alan (ed.). Sussex: Environment, Landscape and Society (PDF). Sussex University. Archived (PDF) from the original on 12 July 2018.
- Smeaton, John (1812). Miscellaneous Papers of John Smeaton. Longman, Hurst, Rees, Orme and Brown.
