= River Uck =

River in East Sussex, England

Coordinates: 50.941°N 0.0535°E

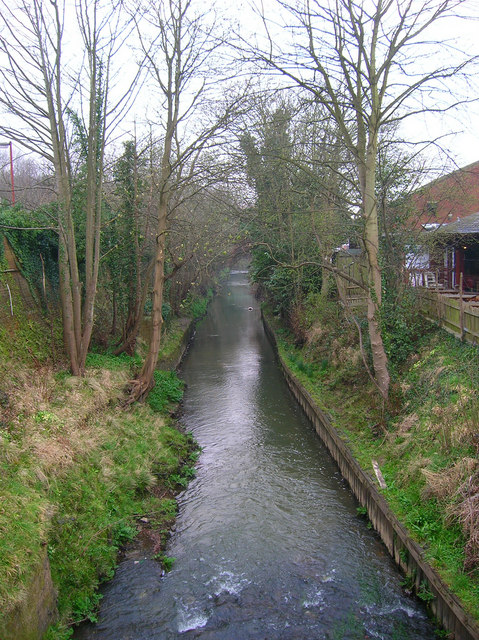
- A portion of River Uck straightened for industrial purposes

The River Uck is a river in East Sussex, United Kingdom, which drains a catchment starting near Crowborough in the North, Hadlow Down to the East and Laughton, East Sussex to the South. It flows through the town of Uckfield and into the River Ouse about 5 miles (8.0 km) north of Lewes. The River Uck has a scenic walk alongside it. The river burst its banks in 2000, flooding much of Uckfield and the surrounding countryside.

The signs indicating the name of the river have been subject to frequent vandalism, resulting in the council fitting specially shaped signs which reduce the ability of vandals to add the letter 'f' to the word 'Uck'.

In the Terry Pratchett and Neil Gaiman novel Good Omens the Uck provides a small but important scene in the narrative.
