= Malling Down =

Nature reserve in East Sussex, England

Coordinates: 50.883°N 0.022°E

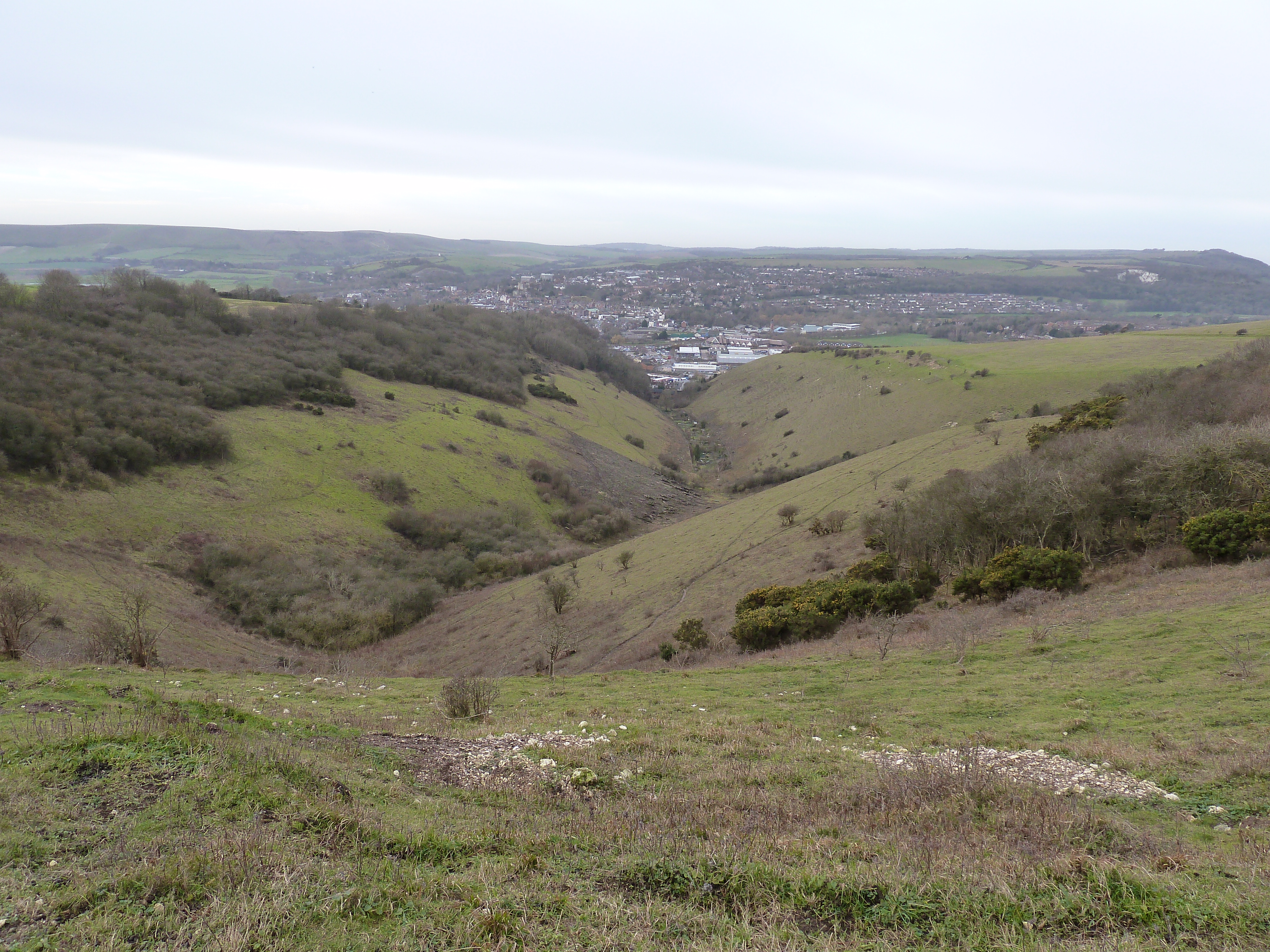
- Interactive map of Malling Down
- Type: Nature reserve
- Location: Lewes, East Sussex
- OS grid: TQ423112
- Area: 85 hectares (210 acres)
- Manager: Sussex Wildlife Trust

Malling Down is an 85-hectare (210-acre) nature reserve on the eastern outskirts of Lewes in East Sussex. It is managed by the Sussex Wildlife Trust. It is part of Lewes Downs, which is a Nature Conservation Review site, Grade I. Special Area of Conservation and Site of Special Scientific Interest.

The South Downs site is chalk grassland, which is one of Britain's richest habitats for flowers. There are many orchids including the widespread common spotted and fragrant and rarer ones such as the musk and frog orchid.
