= Beddingham =

Village in East Sussex, England

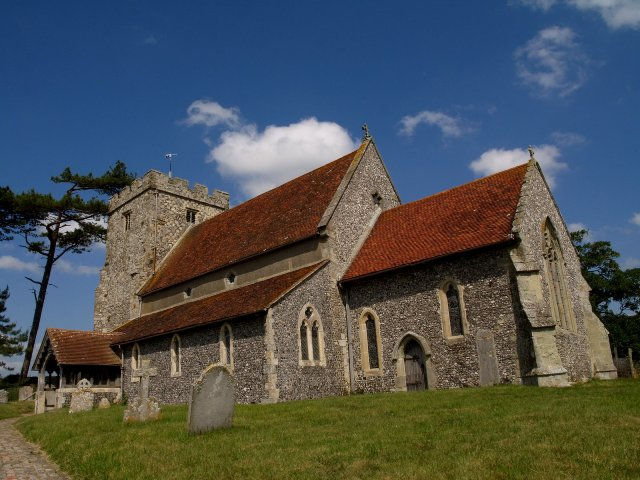
- Beddingham Church

- Location within East Sussex
- Area: 11.4 km^{2} (4.4 sq mi)
- Population: 245 (Parish, 2021)
  - Density: 25/km^{2} (65/sq mi)
- OS grid reference: TQ445078
  - London: 45 miles (72 km) N
- Civil parish: Beddingham
- District: Lewes
- Shire county: East Sussex
- Region: South East
- Country: England
- Sovereign state: United Kingdom
- Post town: LEWES
- Postcode district: BN8
- Dialling code: 01273
- Police: Sussex
- Fire: East Sussex
- Ambulance: South East Coast
- UK Parliament: Lewes
- Website: Parish Council website

Beddingham is a village and civil parish in the Lewes district of East Sussex, England. It lies at the junction between the London–Newhaven (A26) and south coast (A27) roads, to the southeast of the town of Lewes. At the 2021 census the parish had a population of 245. Since 1972 it has shared a grouped parish council with the neighbouring parish of Glynde.

== History ==
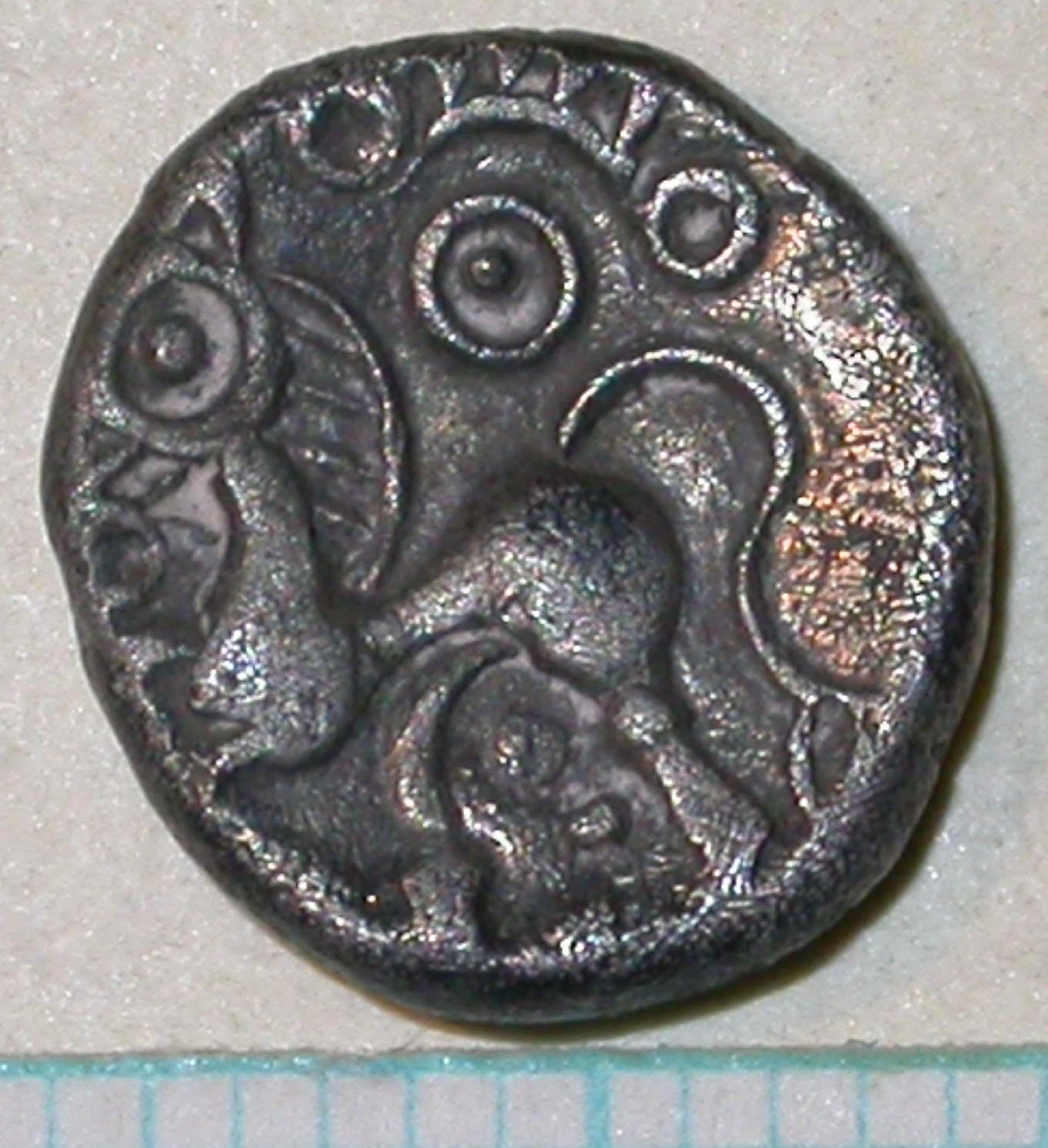
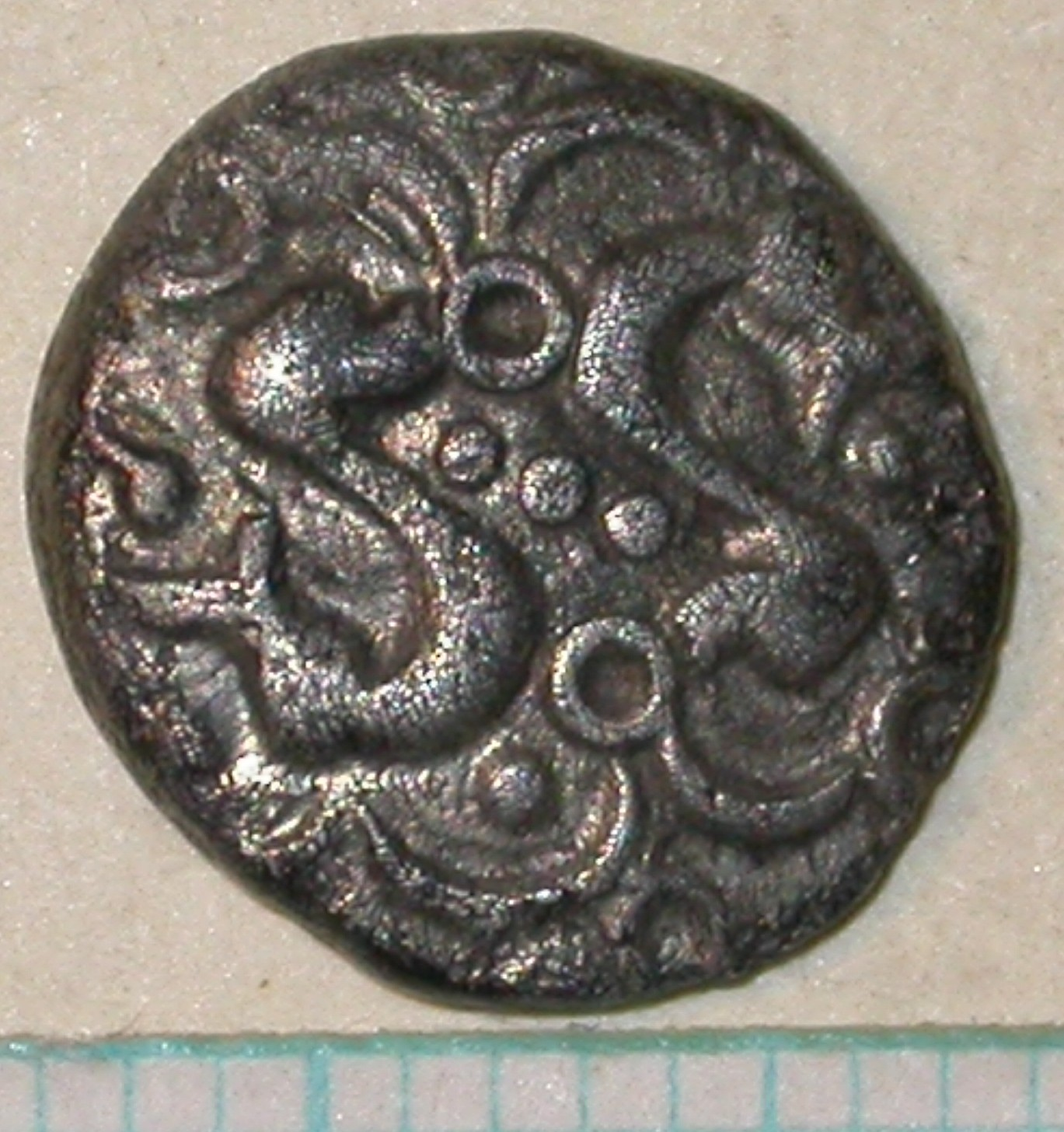
The front (left) and back faces of an Iron Age quarter stater coin, found at Beddingham in 1985 and minted c. 50 BCE.

The area was settled in pre-Roman times with many tumuli in the surrounding hills originating in the Iron Age.

A Roman villa at Beddingham 50.84771°N 0.07115°E was excavated in the 1980s and early 1990s by David Rudling. Construction began in the late first century AD, and the villa was occupied until the mid fourth-century. There was a wooden roundhouse built originally (about 50 AD) before Roman construction began towards the end of the century.

When the Saxons came, one of the buildings on the site was hollowed out, presumably as a Sunken Feature Building (Grubenhaus). The fill of the cut contains a mix of Late Roman and Early Saxon pottery, suggesting some degree of continuity of settlement.

Beddingham was a Saxon royal minster. It was probably seized by Offa of Mercia after his annexation of Sussex early in the 770s. One of Offa's coins was found there. Once back in Saxon possession, the land was bequeathed by King Alfred to his nephew Æthelhelm, and the manor later held by Earl Godwin.

The manor of Preston in Beddingham (or "Preston Becklewin") was originally held by the Abbey of Bec and passed to King's College, Cambridge, on its foundation.

The original church was wooden. The Normans used local flint from the South Downs to construct the present building. The noted horticulturist Frances Garnet Wolseley, 2nd Viscountess Wolseley was buried in the churchyard in 1936.

The 13th-century Itford Farm house (Grade II* listed) was converted into the YHA South Downs youth hostel in 2013.

Glynde railway station opened in 1846. Although named after the adjoining village of Glynde, the station is actually in the parish of Beddingham; the parish boundary follows the river of Glynde Reach. Glynde village now extends south of the river into the area of Beddingham parish around the station, including the rows of cottages called Trevor Gardens.

== Governance ==
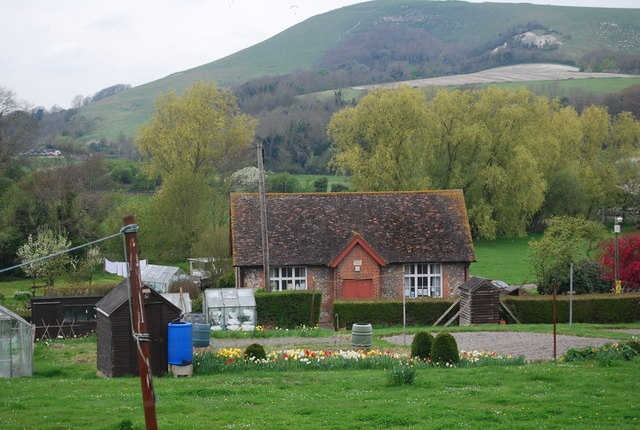
Reading Room

There are three tiers of local government covering Beddingham, at parish, district and county level: Glynde and Beddingham Parish Council, Lewes District Council, and East Sussex County Council. The parish council is a grouped parish council, set up in 1972 to cover the two parishes of Beddingham and Glynde. The parish council meets at the Reading Room (built 1884) adjoining Trevor Gardens.

== Population ==
The parish had a population of 245 at the 2021 census. The population had been 289 in 2001 and 242 in 2011.

== Landscape ==
There are two Sites of Special Scientific Interest (SSSI) within the parish.

- Firle Escarpment, which extends into the neighbouring parish of Firle.
- Asham Quarry, which is of geological interest due to its stratigraphy of Devensian and Flandrian deposits.

The track that runs from Little Dene up to the Firle Escarpment was laid down as a tank road during the Second World War. This was intentionally abandoned after the war, although it is still used by farm vehicles.

== Culture ==
Virginia Woolf spent holidays and weekends during 1912–19 at Asham House, just off the road between Lewes and Newhaven. The house was later surrounded by the cement works that opened in 1932 and became derelict. The Grade II listed house was demolished on 12 July 1994, to allow expansion of Beddingham landfill site.

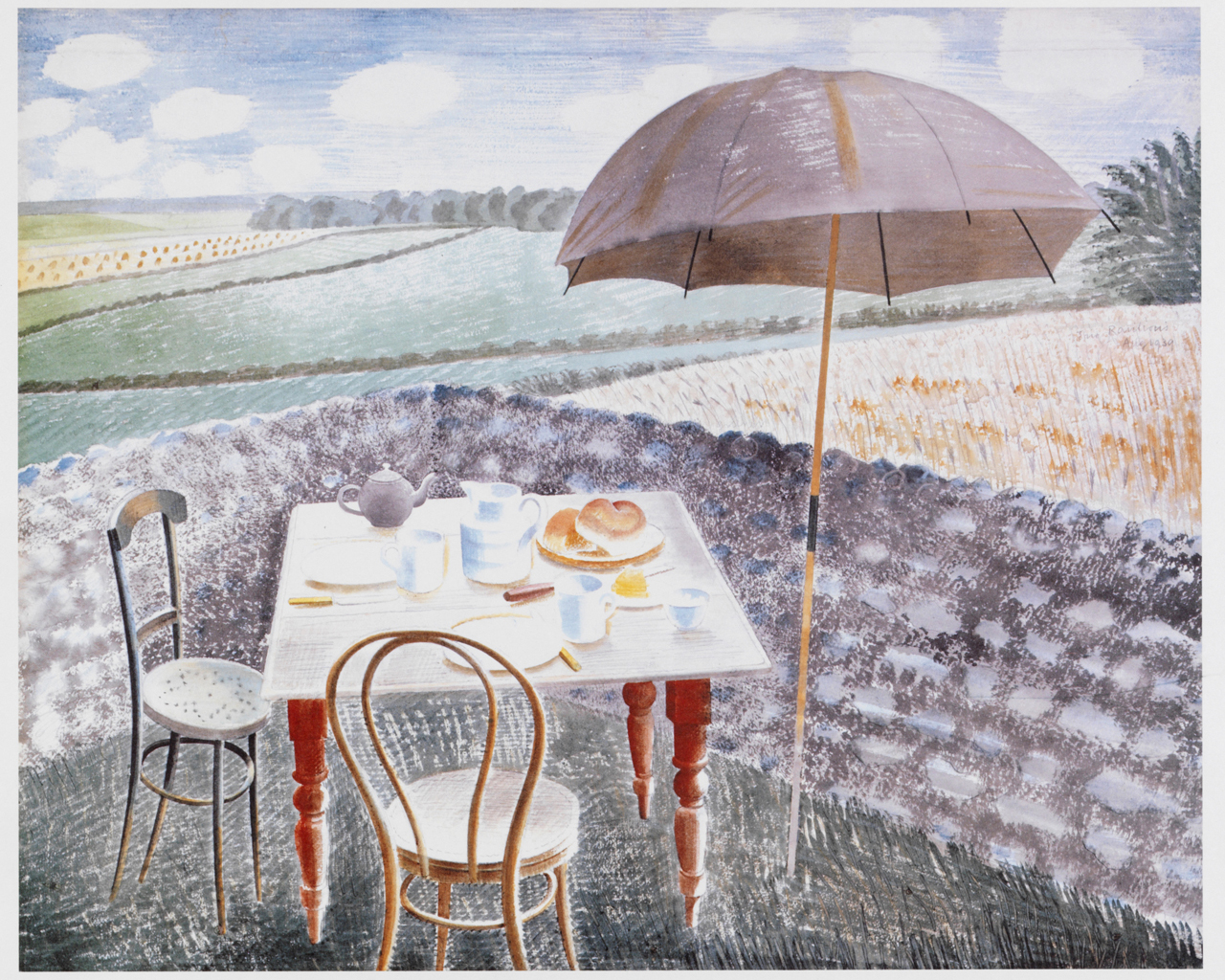
Tea at Furlongs 1939, by Eric Ravilious

Peggy Angus rented Furlongs, a cottage beneath the South Downs, to host a circle of artistic friends, including Eric Ravilious, Tirzah Garwood and John Piper. Ravilious was notably inspired by the landscape to produce some of his famous work, such as Tea at Furlongs.

== Industry ==
An experimental flotation kiln was built into the face of Asham Quarry in 1928. In 1927 the chemist Geoffrey Martin had patented a kiln designed to enable cement to be manufactured more cheaply. The experimental kiln to the patented design was constructed by hand. The experiments lasted three months in late 1929. The kiln was demolished when the quarry was converted into Beddingham landfill site.

Rodmell Works was founded as a cement works with a rotary kiln in 1932, adjacent to Asham Quarry, using a 2-foot (0.61 m) narrow-gauge tramway. Cement was carried to Asham Wharf on the Ouse by an aerial ropeway and there loaded into boats piloted up and down the Ouse by tugs. Clay from Piddinghoe and coal for the kilns were shipped in. The works closed in 1975.

== Beddingham landfill site ==
In 1979 the cement works and quarry were converted into a landfill site that was above a water table and was not initially lined. The site was licensed for industrial, commercial and household waste, with no sub-divisions to keep the different waste streams apart. As part of the preparation for waste disposal, more chalk has been quarried, and sold for use in construction and agriculture.

Three pits have been used for disposal. The first two were relatively low lying, penetrating below the depth of the groundwater table, and were not lined; these were filled and capped in 1985. The third pit is higher, deeper and larger, and has been filled in two stages: the northern half (1985–95) and southern half (1995–2009). The northern half was not lined; the southern half has been lined with a layer of clay and a geo-membrane liner.

Pit	Filling date	Area (ha)	Waste volume (m^{3})	Average waste depth (m)	Base level (mAOD)	Stratum	Leachate (m^{3}/yr)
1	1980–1985	8	800	10	−3 to +5	Gault clay	16000
2	1980–1985	5	500	10	+3 to +8	Cretaceous clay	22480
3 North	1985–1995	8.8	2400	30	+10 to +19	Chalk	Presently unknown
3 South	1995–2009 (Year site closed)	10	2990	30	+15 to +21	Chalk	Presently unknown

The landfill material at Beddingham has consistently been 60% domestic, 30% non-hazardous industrial/commercial and 10% cover (clay/chalk capping). Waste typically includes 15,000 tonnes per year of disposable nappies. In the late 1980s the site was used to dispose of cow carcasses suspected of having BSE in an unlined pit. By the early 1990s the Environment Agency was authorising the disposal of low-level radioactive waste at the site, including some from the University of Sussex. 4.5 cubic metres were disposed of in 1993. Other hazardous material has included waste from the pharmaceutical and cosmetics industry, tyres and asbestos.

A leachate treatment works was built in 1987 comprising two collection lagoons fitted with surface aerators. In 1988 consent was obtained to discharge the aerated leachate into the River Ouse via a ditch on the flood plain, although by 2003 this had not yet been used to discharge any leachate. The accumulated leachate is periodically removed, or used in summer to suppress dust on the landfill.

The three unlined pits were used for "dilute and disperse" disposal of waste; accordingly they are continually releasing leachates into the groundwater. The groundwater flows westwards and is assumed to discharge where the chalk meets the alluvial Ouse flood plain. The discharge runs through open drainage ditches and into the Ouse via tidal flaps. These wetlands lie within a conservation area (SNCI) and are close to another at Lewes Brooks (SSSI).

In 1997 the water quality at a number of surface water sites on the flood plain of the River Ouse were monitored. It was found that the water at some sites may be contaminated by leachate from the landfill site. The macroinvertebrate communities at these surface water sites may be affected.

The leachate from the first two pits is typical of older landfill sites, being neutral in pH, but with high concentrations of NH_{3}-N (260–350 mg/L), Cl (1300–1500 mg/L) and metals including Fe (5–15 mg/L).

In 2005 the Environment Agency refused the operator a Pollution Prevention and Control permit for the site (essential for its operation), as leachate from the landfill posed an unacceptable risk to groundwater round the site. Further improvements to the site's liner system were also required. These issues were resolved.

The site was profitable for Viridor, the waste-management company operating the site. In 2008–2009 the site contributed £4.4m to its profits.

In 2009 the site became full and closed on 16 May. The operator stated that the site will be restored to downland.

Gases from the waste are collected and used to generate some 4.9 MW of power, which is enough for most of the houses in the nearby town of Lewes. This generation of electricity continues since closure.
