= Glynde =

Village in East Sussex, England

Coordinates: 50.8616°N 0.06773°E

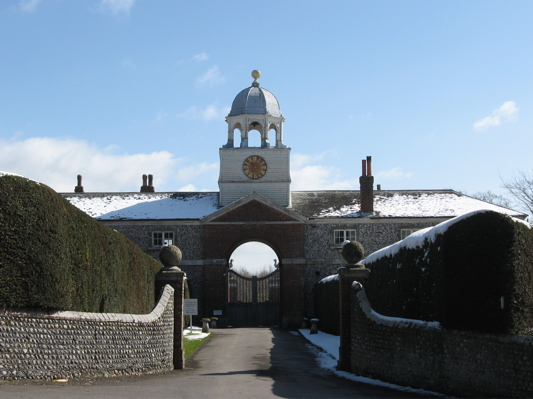
- Glynde Place

- Location within East Sussex
- Area: 17.8 km^{2} (6.9 sq mi)
- Population: 194 (Parish, 2021)
  - Density: 12/km^{2} (31/sq mi)
- OS grid reference: TQ 456 089
  - London: 45 miles (72 km) N
- Civil parish: Glynde
- District: Lewes
- Shire county: East Sussex
- Region: South East
- Country: England
- Sovereign state: United Kingdom
- Post town: LEWES
- Postcode district: BN8
- Dialling code: 01273
- Police: Sussex
- Fire: East Sussex
- Ambulance: South East Coast
- UK Parliament: Lewes
- Website: Parish Council website

Glynde is a village and civil parish in the Lewes District of East Sussex, England. It is located two miles (5 km) east of the town of Lewes. At the 2021 census the parish had a population of 194. The parts of Glynde village around Glynde railway station fall within the neighbouring parish of Beddingham; the two parishes have shared a grouped parish council since 1972.

Glyndebourne is a large house at the northern end of the parish, known for its opera festival.

== Estate ==
The estate at Glynde has belonged to four interlinked families: the Waleys ("from Wales"), Morleys, Trevors, and Brands. The Trevors were originally from north Wales, and descended from Tudor Trevor, a chieftain who in 915 married the daughter of Hywel the Good of Gwynedd and all Wales.

The Glynde manor was not named in the Domesday Book, but it is probably the unnamed peculiar of the Archbishop of Canterbury held by one Godfrey of Malling, who also held the manor of South Malling. By the late 12th century, Richard Waleys held four knight fees of the Archbishop, including Glynde.

The Waleys added further estates near Mayfield (Hawkesden and Bainden), which in the 16th century became the centre of the Wealden ironmaking industry and a major source of wealth. William Morley (1531–97) added the manors of Combe and Beddingham, on the other side of Glynde Reach. Harbert Morley (1616–67) added the manor of Preston Beckhelwyn. These remain part of the Glynde Estate.

== Glynde Place ==
Glynde Place (1569) was erected by William Morley (1531–1597). The house was built of Sussex flint and stone from Caen. It was square, with an inner courtyard.

The house was considerably altered by Richard Trevor (1707–1771), Bishop of Durham, who turned it back to front, so that the house looked east. He added an imposing coach house and stable block to the south. On the walls of knapped flint he erected two wyverns sculpted by John Cheere, the heraldic dragons of the Trevors. In addition, he created a new front hall, embellished the gallery panelling, installed a marble fireplace, and added a set of bronzes.

Glyndebourne, at the northern end of the parish, was formerly part of the Glynde Place estate, but passed into separate ownership in the late 16th century. An opera festival has been held there since 1934.

== Parish ==
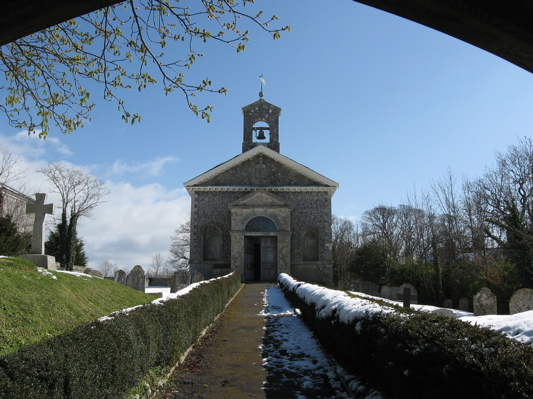
Glynde parish church

Glynde is an ancient parish, which historically formed part of the hundred of Ringmer and Rape of Pevensey. Within the parish, overlooking the village of Glynde, is Mount Caburn, a 480 foot (146 m) isolated peak on top of which sits an Iron Age hill fort.

The rectory of Glynde was held by the Abbots of Bec in Normandy from the Norman Conquest to Agincourt (1415). Henry V's brother, the Duke of Bedford, confiscated it and transferred it to the Dean and Chapter of Windsor (1421). They remain patrons to the living to this day.

The present parish church of St Mary the Virgin, built by Richard Trevor to a design by Sir Thomas Robinson, was dedicated in 1765. The old parish church which it replaced appears to have been similar to many churches in the district, having nave, north aisle, and chancel, with south porch. The new church, in Palladian style, was faced in Sussex flints and lightened with windows of coloured lozenges of Flemish glass; these were taken out in the 19th century, but some of the glass remains in windows in Glynde Place.

The war memorial, with the names of seventeen men of Glynde who fell in the two world wars, is of Portland stone and stands at the bottom of the churchyard, close to the road.

The village was the home of Field Marshal Garnet, Viscount Wolesley (1833–1913) Commander-in-Chief of the British Army from the 1890s until his death in 1913.

Glynde railway station opened in 1846. The station is actually in the neighbouring parish of Beddingham; the parish boundary follows the river of Glynde Reach. Glynde village now extends south of the river into the area of Beddingham parish around the station, including the rows of cottages called Trevor Gardens.

== Governance ==
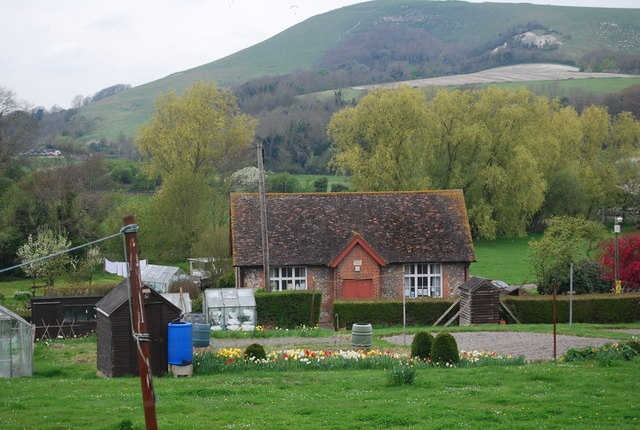
Reading Room

There are three tiers of local government covering Glynde, at parish, district and county level: Glynde and Beddingham Parish Council, Lewes District Council, and East Sussex County Council. The parish council is a grouped parish council, set up in 1972 to cover the two parishes of Beddingham and Glynde. The parish council meets at the Reading Room (built 1884) adjoining Trevor Gardens.

== Transport ==
=== Roads ===
Glynde was once on the turnpike between Lewes and Eastbourne. The turnpike road was constituted by the Glynde Bridge Turnpike Act. It is now Ranscombe Lane. It was not a financial success. In 1817, with its act due to expire in 1821 and the works incomplete, a new turnpike was sponsored to cut across the marshes of Beddingham. This cut 7 miles (11 km) from the journey from Lewes to Eastbourne. The new turnpike road is – broadly – the modern A27. Glynde lies to the north of that road.

=== Railways ===
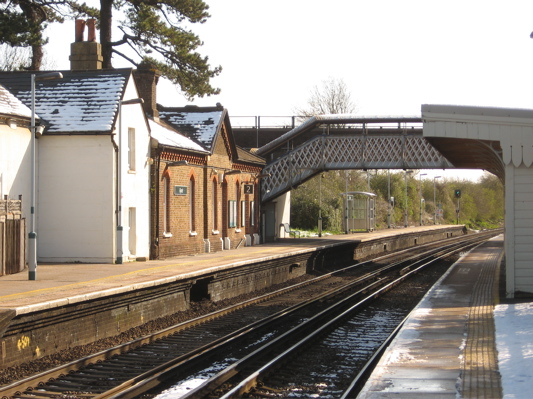
Glynde railway station

Glynde railway station is located on the East Coastway Line east of Lewes and west of Berwick.

The railway arrived in 1846. The railway was electrified in 1935.

There were three industrial lines connected to Glynde station:

- Balcombe Pit was connected to the railway at the eastern end of Glynde station.
- A tramway to Brigden Pit was connected to the western end of Glynde station.
- A clay pit was connected to the eastern end of the station, first by a telpherage line, then by a tramway.

The Glynde telpherage line was built by the Telpherage Company and was opened on Saturday 17 October 1885. Reports of the new system were published as far afield as the New York Times. It was said to cost £1,200, including the equipment to generate electricity, the trains, and the locomotives. The electricity was generated by a dynamo which was powered by a steam engine. The water for the engine was apparently raised by a windmill at the station end of the line. The line extended for almost a mile. It was a double line of steel rods 66 feet (20 m) long and with a 0.75-inch (19 mm) diameter. The rods were elevated 18 feet (5.5 m) above the ground on posts. The locomotive and skips were suspended from pulleys that ran on the rods. A train of ten skips could carry a ton of clay."

== Industries ==
=== Agriculture ===
The Southdown breed of sheep were first bred here by John Ellman.

Frances Garnet Wolseley founded the influential Glynde College for Lady Gardeners at Trevor House, Glynde in 1899. It continued to offer two-year courses at Ragged Lands from 1902 until about 1933.

=== Lime ===
Chalk pits are long standing features in the area, used for liming the fields, mending the roads, and occasionally making mortar for building. Transportation by road was prohibitively expensive, so the pits had minimal commercial value.

Then in 1846 the railway came and Henry Otway Trevor immediately leased all the chalk pits in Glynde and Beddingham to a Lewes limeburning partnership. Three pits were named: Glyndebourne, Brigden, and Balcombe (also known as Poor or Newington). The procedure was to excavate the chalk, turn it into lime in large kilns, and transport it away by rail to be used as cement. The kilns were coal-fired; much of the coal was shipped by barge up Glynde Reach to the wharves at Glynde Bridge. The work in the chalk pits was labour-intensive, with over a hundred men employed in the pits at their peak.

=== Clay ===
A clay pit was opened in 1885 north of Glynde Reach, to the east of Decoy Wood. The pit was to supply Gault clay to the new Sussex Portland Cement works at South Heighton. Both were on land leased from the Glynde Estate for 99 years. In the event, the clay pit was only worked for around 30 years. Initially the clay was transported via a telpherage line to Glynde station, latterly (by the late 1890s) via a tramway.

=== Power ===
The lack of fast-moving water has prevented the production of power by water mills. Instead, a number of windmills have been built.

- It seems that in medieval times there was a windmill at Wyck (grid reference TQ 447 106).
- In the 16th and 17th centuries there was a windmill on an old burial mound just above and to the west of Speaker's Holt on the crest of the Downs. This was no longer in operation by 1717. Apparently even the mound has now been bulldozed.
- A Glyndebourne estate windmill lay within Ringmer parish, on Mill Plain, just above Glyndebourne.
- Edward Elphick erected a windmill that stood from 1806 to 1867, located on the Balcombe lands that were eventually swallowed up by the chalk pit. When the mill stood in the way of the pit's expansion, it was dismantled and moved to Blackboys. Its operation there ceased in 1937 and it was demolished in 1945.

When Elphick's windmill was dismantled in 1867, the local farmers transferred their custom to the new steam mill built between Glynde station and Glynde Reach.

== Economy and tourism ==
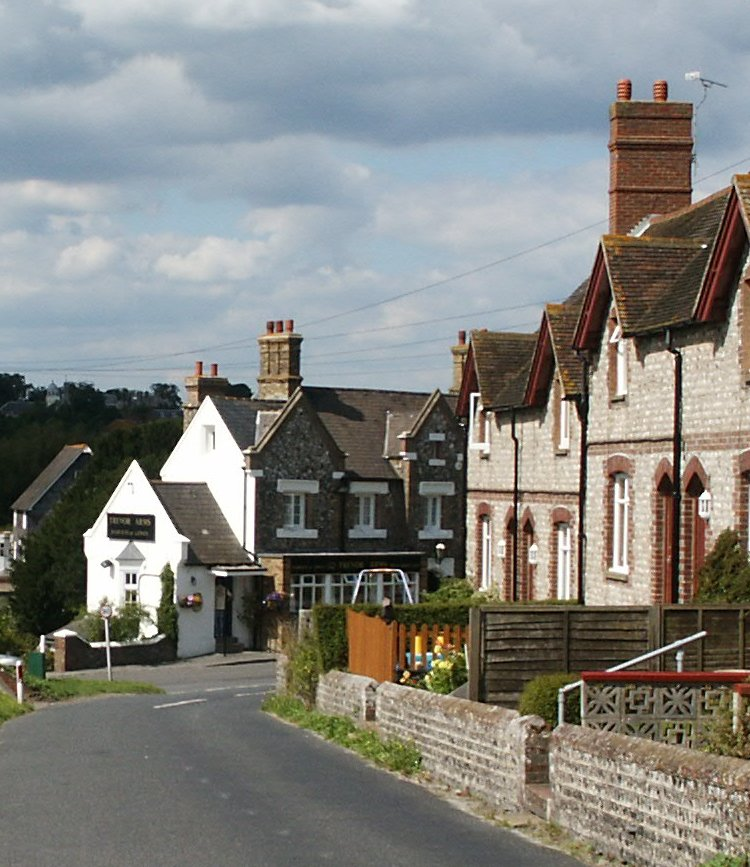
Glynde

Glynde has an unusually large number of businesses for a small English village. In addition to the usual village shop, there is a staircase manufacturer in the old steam mill and a weighing equipment manufacturer in the old granary.

Glynde has several tourist attractions. Many tourists are people walking on the South Downs; Glynde sits on the flank of Mount Caburn. The Elizabethan manor house, Glynde Place, is open to the public. Other facilities for visitors include a teashop, a forge, and a paragliding and hang-gliding centre. North of the village is Glyndebourne, where opera is performed. The village has a total of 27 listed buildings by Historic England, including Glynde Place, a Grade I Listed Building.

The Trevor Arms was a pub in the village, near the station, but it closed in January 2017. In July 2025, it reopened under new ownership.

The village is the location the Jazz Festival Love Supreme is hosted at, attracting 40,000 visitors to the village in 2018.

== Sites of Special Scientific Interest ==
There are three Sites of Special Scientific Interest (SSSIs) in the parish. Southerham Grey Pit and Southerham Machine Bottom Pit are disused chalk pits, which display a wide variety of fossilised fish remains. Lewes Downs is a SSSI designated for its biological interest; it forms is an isolated area of the South Downs.
