= Lewes Downs =

Protected area in East Sussex, England

Coordinates: 50.871°N 0.041°E

- Site of Special Scientific Interest
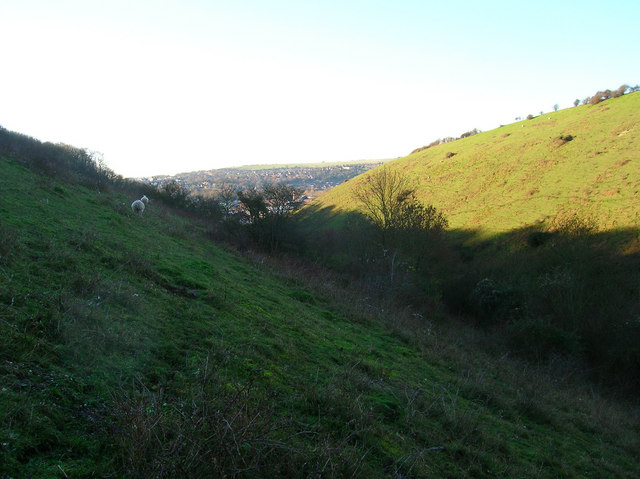
- Location of Lewes Downs.
- Area of search: East Sussex
- Grid reference: TQ 437 099
- Interest: Biological
- Area: 165.0 hectares (408 acres)
- Notification date: 1986
- Location map: Magic Map

Lewes Downs is a 165-hectare (410-acre) biological Site of Special Scientific Interest east of Lewes in East Sussex. It is a Nature Conservation Review site, Grade I and a Special Area of Conservation. Part of it is a national nature reserve, part is Malling Down nature reserve, which is managed by the Sussex Wildlife Trust, and part is Mount Caburn, an Iron Age hill fort which is a Scheduled Monument.

This south-facing slope on the South Downs is ecologically rich chalk grassland and scrub. Flora include the nationally rare early-spider orchid and it also has a diverse invertebrate fauna and an important breeding community of downland birds.
