= Chalvington with Ripe =

Parish in East Sussex, England

Coordinates: 50.864436°N 0.159125°E

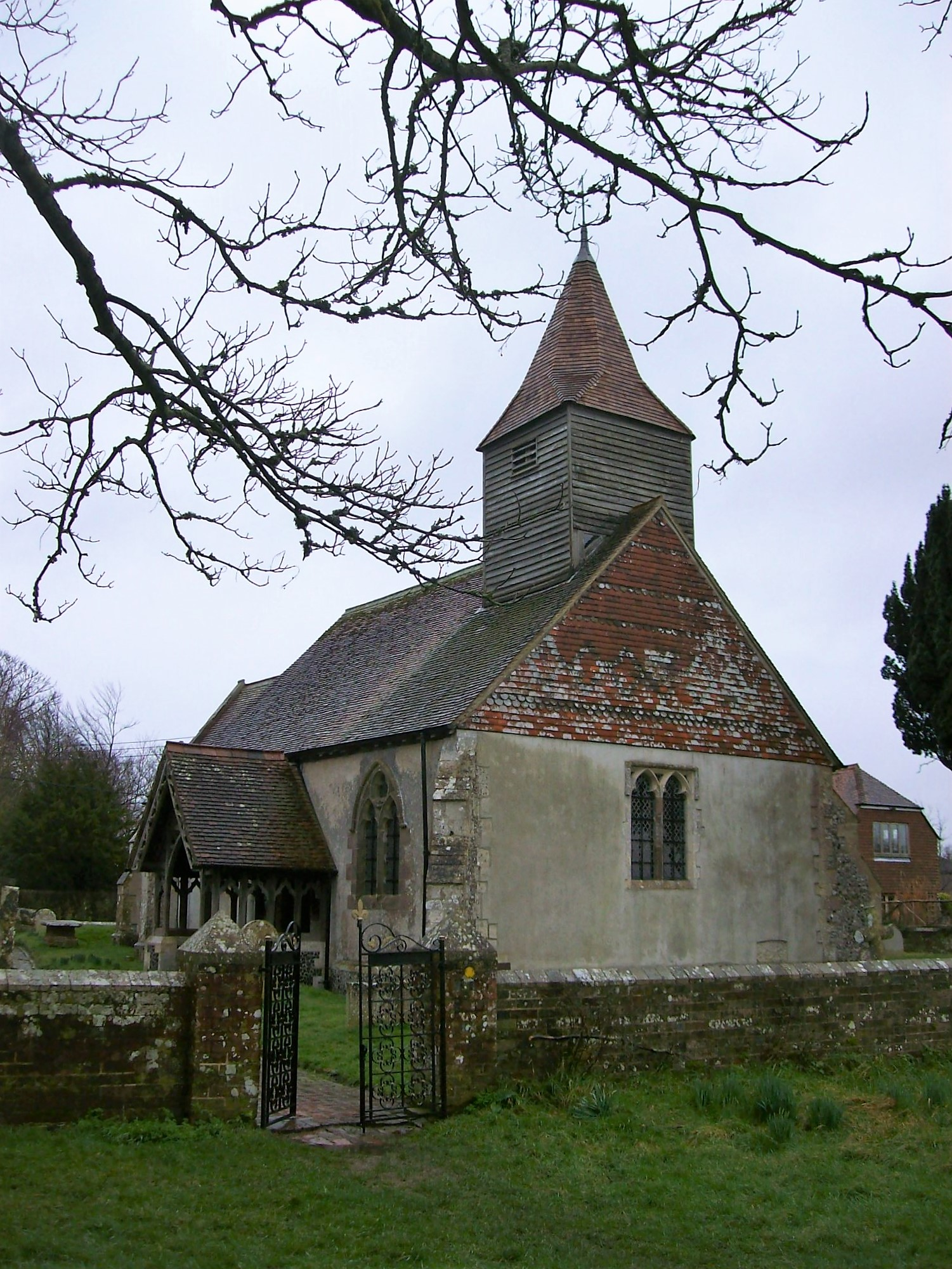
- St Bartholomew's church, Chalvington

- Location within East Sussex
- Area: 11.12 km^{2} (4.29 sq mi)
- Population: 953 (2011)
  - Density: 252/sq mi (97/km^{2})
- OS grid reference: TQ520094
  - London: 46 miles (74 km) NNW
- District: Wealden
- Shire county: East Sussex
- Region: South East
- Country: England
- Sovereign state: United Kingdom
- Post town: HAILSHAM
- Postcode district: BN27
- Dialling code: 01323
- Police: Sussex
- Fire: East Sussex
- Ambulance: South East Coast
- UK Parliament: Lewes
- Website: Chalvington with Ripe

The civil parish of Chalvington with Ripe, in the Wealden District of East Sussex, England, is made up of the two villages, Chalvington and Ripe. They are located in the upper Rivers Cuckmere and Ouse joint valley north of the South Downs, between the A27 and the A22 roads, and some 15 miles (24 km) northwest of Eastbourne.

Ripe is the larger of the two ecclesiastical parishes with 1,120 acres (450 hectares), compared to the 729 acres (295 hectares) of Chalvington. The civil parish was formed on 1 April 1999 from "Chalvington" and "Ripe" parishes.

== History of the villages ==
The Romans built a road through the two villages, and remains of the layout can still be seen.

In medieval times the area had a profitable wool trade.

== The villages ==
=== Chalvington ===
The village of Chalvington (Charnton in the traditional Sussex dialect) is named Calvintone or Caveltone in the Domesday Book of 1086. It is located in the area between the A27 and the A22 roads, some 15 miles (24 km) north-west of Eastbourne. The name Chalvington is first attested as Caveltone and Calvintone in Domesday Book; it is Old English in origin, and means Cealfa's farm. Many local names derive from the Anglo-Saxon occupation of the area.

There is one public house in the village, the Yew Tree Inn. The parish church is dedicated to St Bartholomew.

=== Ripe ===
Ripe is a village within the Wealden District of East Sussex, England. It is located eight miles (13 km) east of Lewes in the valley north of the South Downs. The two villages are adjacent to one another, Ripe ecclesiastical parish being the larger of the two in area. There is limited public transport to the village.

The village, in a mainly rural area, is mentioned in the Domesday Book and has had a number of names, including Alchitone, Achiltone, Achintone, Echentone and Eckington. The 13th-century parish church is dedicated to St John the Baptist. There is limited public transport to the village.

At the end of the Anglo-Saxon period it was owned by Earl Harold Godwinson, who become King Harold II and was killed at the Battle of Hastings in 1066. The Domesday Book mentions 'Rype' and 'Echentone' which were owned by Richer de Aquila (L'Aigle), and the church is also mentioned in Pope Nicholas IV's Taxatio Ecclesiastica of 1291, an ecclesiastical tax assessment survey.

The novelist Malcolm Lowry, best known for Under the Volcano, died at age 47 in a boarding house in Ripe on 27 June 1957. Lowry is buried in the village churchyard. Ripe was also the retirement home of the tattooed performer Horace Ridler (the Great Omi) who died there in 1969.

There was one public house, now closed.
