= River Ouse, Sussex =

River in Sussex, England

Ouse
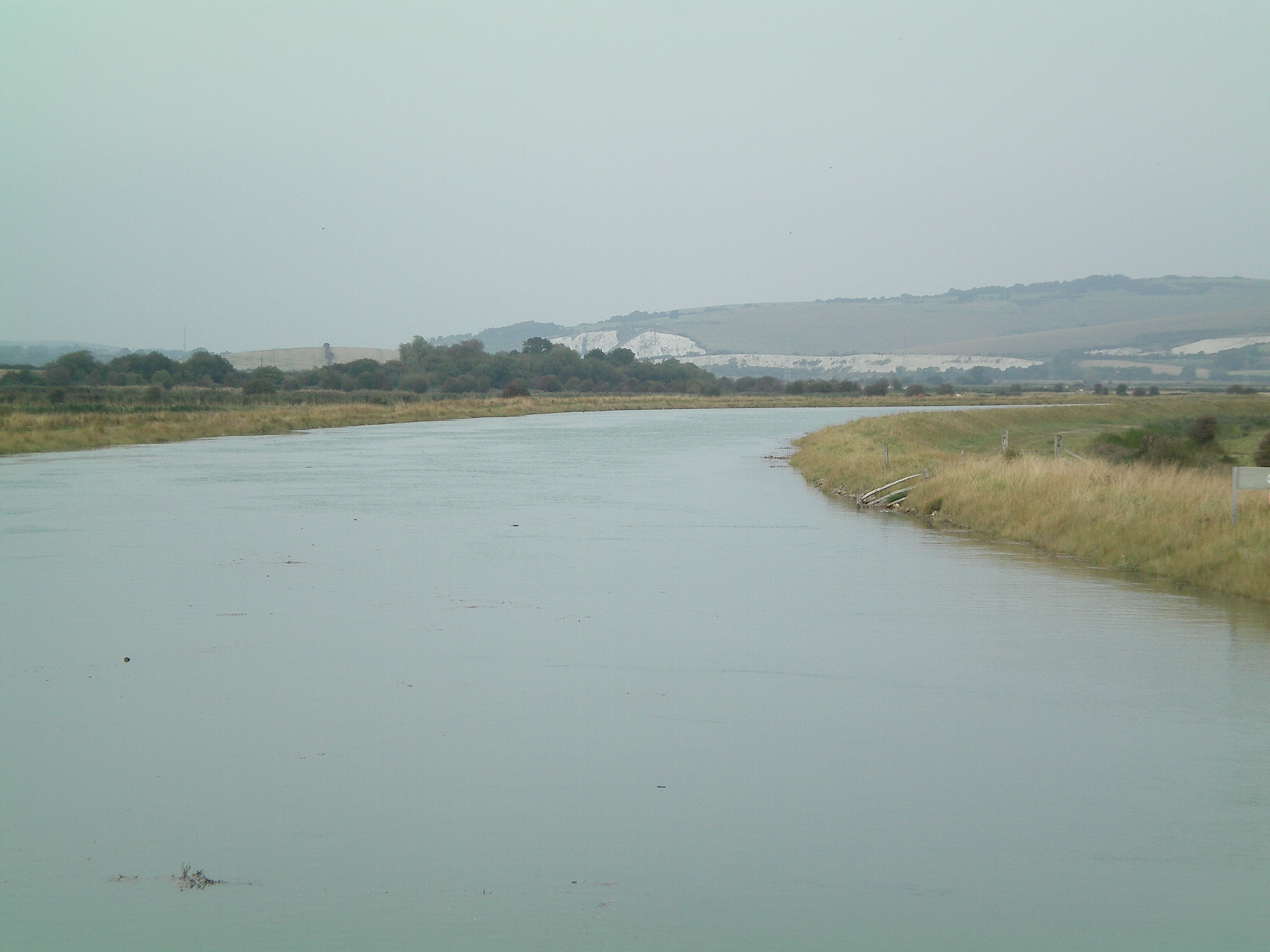
- View looking north towards Cliffe at high tide from Southease swing bridge

Location
- Country: England
- Counties: West Sussex, East Sussex
- Towns/Cities: Slaugham, Lindfield, Newick, Isfield, Barcombe, Lewes, Newhaven

Physical characteristics
- Source
  - location: Lower Beeding, West Sussex, UK
  - coordinates: 51.038875°N 0.234315°W
  - elevation: 85 m (279 ft)
- Mouth: English Channel
  - location: Newhaven, East Sussex, UK
  - coordinates: 50.784217°N 0.057995°E
  - elevation: 0 m (0 ft)
- Length: 35 m (115 ft)

The Ouse (/uːz/ OOZ) is a 35 miles (56 kilometres) long river in the English counties of West and East Sussex. It rises near Lower Beeding in West Sussex, and flows eastwards and then southwards to reach the sea at Newhaven. It skirts Haywards Heath and passes through Lewes. It forms the main spine of an extensive network of smaller streams, of which the River Uck is the main tributary. As it nears the coast it passes through the Lewes and Laughton Levels, an area of flat, low-lying land that borders the river and another tributary, the Glynde Reach. It was a large tidal inlet at the time of the Domesday Book in 1086, but over the following centuries, some attempts were made to reclaim some of the valley floor for agriculture, by building embankments, but the drainage was hampered by the buildup of a large shingle bar which formed across the mouth of the river by longshore drift.

In 1539, a new channel for the entrance to the river was cut through the shingle bar, and meadows flourished for a time, but flooding returned and meadows reverted to marshland. The engineer John Smeaton proposed a solution for the drainage of the valley in 1767, but it was only partly implemented. William Jessop surveyed the river in 1788, and produced proposals to canalise the upper river above Lewes, and to radically improve the lower river. The Proprietors of the River Ouse Navigation were created by act of Parliament, the River Ouse Navigation Act 1790 (30 Geo. 3. c. 52), and eventually built 19 locks, to enable boats to reach Upper Ryelands Bridge at Balcombe. Trustees and the Commissioners of the Lewes and Laughton Levels jointly managed the work on the lower river, and the agriculturalist John Ellman continued the progress while he was Expenditor for the Commissioners, which enabled 120-ton ships to reach Lewes by 1829. Navigation on the upper river could not compete with the railways, and all traffic had ceased by 1868.

On the lower river, Newhaven became an important port and barge traffic continued using the river up to Lewes until the 1950s. Cross-Channel ferries still sail from the port. The river provides habitat for many varieties of fish, including unusually large sea trout that swim up the river to spawn in the higher tributaries. The Lewes Brooks area of the levels is a Site of Special Scientific Interest because of its wide variety of invertebrates. Walkers can follow the course of the river by using the Sussex Ouse Valley Way long-distance footpath, and the Sussex Ouse Conservation Society promotes awareness of the navigation by publishing details of shorter walks. The Sussex Ouse Restoration Trust is hoping to see navigation restored to the upper river, but this is not universally popular, as the Ouse and Adur Rivers Trust is opposed to the idea.

== Ecology and wildlife ==
The River Ouse catchment plays a critical role in supporting regional biodiversity, notably providing habitat for the Sussex sea trout (Salmo trutta). As an apex predator and key indicator species, sea trout spend up to two years in nursery streams before migrating into the English Channel and returning to their natal spawning grounds. The chalk-fed North End Stream, alongside the Bevern Stream, forms a vital part of this ecological system. The Wild Trout Trust identifies the North End Stream as a nationally and locally significant spawning ground and nursery for the species. The sea trout holds protected status as a Species of Principal Importance under Section 41 of the Natural Environment and Rural Communities Act 2006, is listed under the Environment Targets (Biodiversity) Regulations 2023, and is prioritized in the draft East Sussex Local Nature Recovery Strategy.

Despite ongoing restoration work across the catchment, local populations face severe pressure from habitat degradation, climate change, and pollution. Emerging threats include proposed housing developments adjacent to the North End Stream, which risk damaging spawning beds through siltation, toxic runoff, and increased sewage discharge. To mitigate these risks, local community groups and conservation organisations, including the Sussex Wildlife Trust have partnered to improve habitat connectivity. This collaborative effort led to the formation of the Charter of Rights for the River Ouse, a community-led initiative officially supported by Lewes District Council, Lewes Town Council, and Hamsey Parish Council to establish legal and practical protections for the river and its tributaries.

There are also populations of pike and more recently carp, both of which can exceed 30 pounds (14 kg) in weight. Other species include barbel, roach, dace, rudd, perch, chub, bream and tench. The Sheffield and Batts Bridge tributaries have small populations of pumpkinseed, which have escaped from on-line fish ponds, and since 2009 a few Wels catfish have appeared in the river at and upstream of Lewes. Rarer breeds which inhabit the river include grayling, stone loach, river lampreys, and bullhead, which are a species under threat on an international scale. The tidal stretches contain fish that can tolerate the lower levels of salt found in brackish water, including flounder, grey mullet, bass, twait shad, and sea lampreys.

Lewes Brooks is a Site of Special Scientific Interest on the levels to the west of the river below Lewes. It covers an area of 822.8 acres (333.0 ha), and is noted for its wide diversity of water beetles, rare snails, flies and moths. The habitat is enhanced by a gradation in the water, which varies from fresh in the west to brackish in the east. Several studies into the presence and effects of organic and inorganic pollutants in the Sussex Ouse have been carried out, including one on the effects of estrogens entering the river from Sewage Treatment Works outfalls on the reproductive physiology of fish.

=== Water quality ===
The Environment Agency measure the water quality of the river systems in England. Each is given an overall ecological status, which may be one of five levels: high, good, moderate, poor and bad. There are several components that are used to determine this, including biological status, which looks at the quantity and varieties of invertebrates, angiosperms and fish. Chemical status, which compares the concentrations of various chemicals against known safe concentrations, is rated good or fail.

Apart from the initial section from its source to Ardingly, the channel is designated as heavily modified, because of the canalisation works. The water quality of the River Ouse system was as follows in 2019.

Section	Ecological Status	Chemical Status	Length	Catchment	Channel
Ouse from Slaugham to Ardingly Reservoir	Moderate	Fail	6.9 miles (11.1 km)	14.49 square miles (37.5 km^{2})	
Ouse Ardingly to confluence with Scrase Brk	Moderate	Fail	4.5 miles (7.2 km)	4.66 square miles (12.1 km^{2})	heavily modified
Middle Ouse	Moderate	Fail	9.2 miles (14.8 km)	10.55 square miles (27.3 km^{2})	heavily modified
Ouse between Isfield and Coast	Moderate	Fail	2.4 miles (3.9 km)	0.99 square miles (2.6 km^{2})	heavily modified
Ouse	Moderate	Fail			heavily modified

Reasons for the quality being less than good include discharges from sewage treatment works, physical modification to the channel, which prevents the free movement of fish, and runoff from agricultural land. Like most rivers in the UK, the chemical status changed from good to fail in 2019, due to the presence of polybrominated diphenyl ethers (PBDE), perfluorooctane sulphonate (PFOS) and mercury compounds, none of which had previously been included in the assessment.

== Course ==
The River Ouse, together with its main tributary the River Uck, form the central spines of a network of streams and rivers which drain over 250 square miles (650 km^{2}) of Sussex. There are around 750 miles (1,200 km) of streams in total, of which some 140 miles (230 km) are designated as main rivers, on which the Environment Agency has a responsibility for maintenance.

The river rises near Lower Beeding in West Sussex and meanders eastwards, passing under Upper Ryelands Bridge, once the limit of navigation. After it has been joined by the outflow from Ardingly Reservoir, created by building a dam across the valley of a tributary, which has resulted in the partial flooding of two river valleys, it turns to the south east, passing to the north of Lindfield and Haywards Heath. It passes into East Sussex just before reaching Sheffield Park railway station on the preserved Bluebell Railway. After skirting around Newick, it turns to the south and is joined by its main tributary, the River Uck, flowing in from the north east, before reaching Isfield. Most of the tributaries are in the upper catchment that have joined it originate in the heaths and forests of the High Weald, where fast-flowing small streams cut deep valleys through woods, and flow over underlying beds of sandstones and clays.

Below Isfield, the narrow valley widens out into a broad flood plain, and the river is joined by the Longford Stream, the Iron River and the Bevern Stream, before it reaches Barcombe Mills. There is a network of channels at Barcombe, which once supplied water for at least two watermills, but the last one was destroyed by fire in 1938. On the east bank of the river is Barcombe Reservoir and Water Treatment Works. Both are owned by South East Water, who extract water from the river and depending on the quality of the water, store it in the reservoir or treat it immediately and pump it into the public water supply. The works was constructed in two stages, in 1962 and 1977 and can deliver up to 75 Megalitres per day (Mld) for public consumption. Just north of this on the west bank of the river is the Anchor Inn, dating from 1790, which has boats for hire, restaurants and bars, and is licensed for civil weddings.

Some of the tributaries on this middle section are similar to those on the upper section, but others are lowland streams, where the underlying geology is alluvium and clays, and which flow more slowly. The Bevern Stream and Northend Stream both originate in the chalk uplands of the South Downs, but traverse greensand and clay before they reach the Ouse. Below the weirs of Barcombe, the river is partially tidal, and forms large meanders, with numerous ox-bow lakes. At Hamsey, a long lock cut crosses the neck of a large meander creating Hamsey Island, home to St Peter's Church, which is situated on a mount. Much of it dates from the 12th century, with 14th and 15th century additions, and the structure is Grade I listed. Flow on the river above is modulated by a half-weir, which prevented a serious ecological disaster spreading further downstream, when a spillage of pesticide near Newick in 2001 killed the insect populations and more than 500 fish on a 12-mile (20 km) stretch of the river.

The tidal river continues through the town of Lewes, where the channel has been considerably modified over time, and is crossed by three bridges. Willey's Bridge is a small footbridge opened in 1965, to provide public access to South Malling church and to enable residents in housing estates built at Malling to get to Lewes. Previously, access to the church had only been available on Sundays, when owners of Malling Deanery allowed people to use their private suspension bridge, constructed in 1934, and located a little further upstream. This had in turn replaced a wooden bridge erected in 1868. The Phoenix Causeway is a larger road bridge named after the former Phoenix Ironworks, which was constructed in 1979 to provide a bypass for Cliffe High Street, and the Grade II listed Cliffe Bridge carries the High Street over the river. It was designed by Nicholas Dubois, and built in 1726–27. It consists of a single arch in red brick with stone dressings, but the original design has been modified. An inscribed keystone was obscured when a footway was added to the north side of the bridge in 1888, and cast iron balustrades replaced the original brick balustrades when the bridge was reconstructed in 1932. After Cliffe the Winterbourne stream flows into the Ouse and also supplies water to the Railway Land nature reserve, owned by Lewes District Council, and managed with help from the Railway Land Wildlife Trust. It covers 25 acres (10 ha) and was the site of railway sidings until 1989. It includes a reed bed called the Heart of Reeds. The Ouse continues southeast past Glynde, where the tributary of Glynde Reach joins from the east, and then passes Rodmell, Southease and Piddinghoe. There are public pathways on both sides of the channel for most of this stretch.

At Southease there is a swing bridge, designed by Henry E Wallis of Westminster in 1878 and installed two years later, to replace a previous structure slightly further upstream. It consists of three bowspring arches, one fixed and the other two mounted on a central pivot. It was manually operated by a capstan mounted on the movable section, and is a rare example of its type, which are more normally found in docks and industrial areas. In 1988, Parliamentary approval was obtained to fix the bridge in position, as it had not been opened since 1967. The river finally reaches Newhaven, where it splits industrial Denton Island from the mainland. A wooden drawbridge was built in 1794 to carry the coastal road over the river, but this was replaced in 1866, when a cast iron swing bridge was erected in its place. It carried both a road and a tramway, which was used in the construction of the West Quay breakwater, a project which was finally completed in 1889. The tramway was then used to facilitate maintenance of the breakwater, until the tracks were lifted in 1963. A new road bridge, at a higher level and slightly further to the north, replaced the swing bridge in 1974. It is opened regularly for commercial shipping, near to high tide, but as the bridge carries the A259 road, each opening causes significant traffic congestion. Below the bridge, the river becomes the Port of Newhaven, where there is a ferry terminal for sailings to Dieppe in France, a service which has been running since 1847. Finally, the river flows into the English Channel, surrounded on either side by two long breakwater piers.

== Name ==
'Ouse' is a common name for rivers in England, with examples including the Ouse in Yorkshire, and the Great Ouse and Little Ouse in Norfolk, Suffolk and Cambridgeshire. The name may stem from the Celtic word Ūsa, which is in turn derived from the word *udso-, meaning "water". The root of this word is the Indo-European *wed-, from which the modern English words "wet" and "water" also stem. If this derivation is correct, then its name is a tautology, meaning "Water river" or "Wet river". However, the National Rivers Authority stated that the river above Lewes was called the Middewinde historically, while the river from Lewes to the sea was called "The Great River of Lewes", and that the present name is a contraction of Lewes. This claim is also supported by others.

== Formation ==
The Ouse is one of the four rivers that cut through the South Downs. It is presumed that its valley was cut during a glacial period, since it forms the remnant of a much larger river system that once flowed onto the floor of what is now the English Channel. In the warmer interglacials the lower valley would have flooded; there are raised beaches 40 metres (Goodwood-Slindon) and 8 metres (Brighton-Norton) above present sea level. The offshore topography indicates that the current coastline was also the coastline before the final deglaciation, and therefore the mouth of the Ouse has long been at its present latitude.

== Inundation and drainage ==
When the Domesday Book was produced in 1086, the Ouse valley was probably a tidal inlet with a string of settlements located at its margins. In later centuries the river was draining the valley sufficiently well for some of the marshland to be reclaimed, by building embankments to create highly prized meadow land. However, by the 14th century the Ouse valley was regularly flooding in winter, and frequently the waters remained on the lower meadows through the summer. In 1422 a Commission of Sewers was appointed to restore the banks and drainage between the coast and Fletching, around 20 miles (32 km) inland, which may indicate that the Ouse was affected by the same storm that devastated the Netherlands in the St Elizabeth's flood of 1421. Drainage became so bad that 400 acres (1.6 km^{2}) of the Archbishop of Canterbury's meadow at Southerham were converted into a permanent fishery (the Brodewater) in the mid-15th century, and by the 1530s the entire Lewes and Laughton Levels comprising over 6,000 acres (24 km^{2}), were reduced to marshland again.

Part of the problem of flooding was caused by longshore drift creating a huge shingle bar across the river mouth, which had gradually moved eastwards to Seaford, some 2 miles (3.2 km) from its position in Roman times. The bar prevented the river from draining effectively, and made it difficult for ships to enter the estuary. Prior Crowham of Lewes Priory sailed to Flanders and returned with two drainage experts. In 1537 a water-rate was levied on all lands on the Levels to fund the cutting of a channel through the shingle bar at the mouth of the Ouse, below Castle Hill at Meeching, to allow the river to drain the Levels. This canalisation created access to a sheltered harbour, Newhaven, which succeeded Seaford as the port at the mouth of the Ouse.

The new channel was completed by 1539 and drained the Levels so that much of the valley floor could be reclaimed for pasture. However, shingle continued to accumulate and so the mouth of the Ouse began to migrate eastwards again. In 1648 the Ouse was reported to be unfit either to drain the levels or for navigation. At some time between 1676 and the publication of an Admiralty chart in 1698, the river flowed along the back of the shingle bar and broke through into the sea about 0.5 miles (0.8 km) further to the east, at the site of a tide mill. The outlet at Newhaven had been reinstated by 1731, when the Newhaven Harbour Commissioners were established by act of Parliament. The engineer John Reynolds carried out some work for them on the piers at the entrance to the river, and constructed a sluice across it at Piddinghoe between 1731 and 1733, working for the Drainage Commissioners, but that was short lived, as it was damaged in 1736 and taken down rather than repaired. By the 18th century the valley was regularly inundated in winter and often flooded in summer.

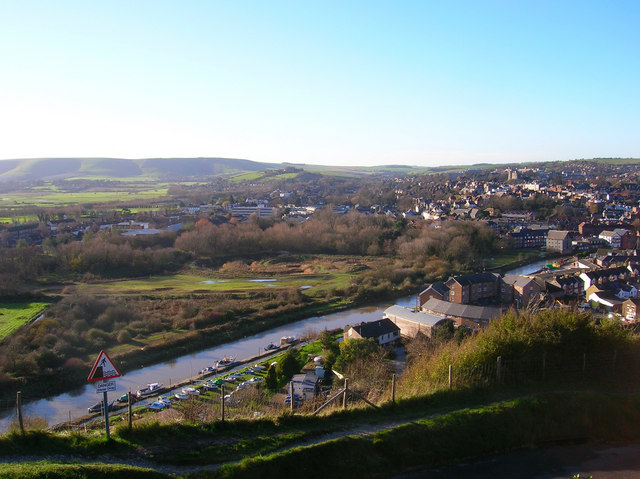
This straightened tidal stretch of the River Ouse just south of Lewes is called Cliffe Cut. It was made when the Ouse was canalised in the late 1790s. The original course of the river meandered in the foreground.

=== Smeaton's survey ===
In 1767 the Commissioners for the Lewes and Laughton Levels employed the engineer John Smeaton to survey the river and the drainage of the levels, which he did over four days in June following a period of wet weather. He found that the meadows, which were locally known as brooks, were in many cases under water, but that their condition, and therefore the remedies that would be required, were variable. In particular, the brooks of Southover, Iford, Pool Bar, and Rodmell, which he called the West Levels, were badly affected as their embankments were low and poorly maintained. At high tide, the level of the river was above that in the meadows. The same applied to Ranscombe brooks, to the north of the junction between the Ouse and the Glynde, Further down river, at White Wall and Tarring, the brooks were generally dry, which he attributed to the land surface being higher, the walls being higher and well maintained, and the outfall sluices from the meadows being arranged at a lower level in relation to the river.

He noted that the rise and fall of the tide below Piddinghoe was some 8 feet (2.4 m), but this was reduced to just 6 inches (15 cm) at the mouth of the Glynde, and was barely visible at Lewes Bridge. A series of shoals, combined with the narrow and winding channel, held water back and prevented it from draining from the levels. He also commented on the great shingle bar crossing the mouth of the river at Newhaven, which if removed would allow the water levels to be around 6.5 feet (2.0 m) lower at low tide. The brooks above Lewes Bridge became gradually drier as he progressed towards Barcombe Mill, but with almost no fall on the river, its winding course and numerous shoals hampered the drainage of the meadows. The brooks bordering the Glynde, to the east of Ranscombe, were generally at a higher level, but were affected by stagnant water lying on the surface. There was again no gradient on that river, which followed a winding course, but he was confident that if the drainage of Ranscombe could be solved, the drainage of the Laughton Levels would also be.

His first proposal to achieve the drainage of the levels was to straighten the river, to remove all of the obstructions, and to construct an outfall sluice, to prevent the tides entering the river. The brooks on the west level and at Ranscombe would need better embankments, and adequate sluices to allow water to drain away when required. A second option involved raising the banks on all of the meadows, and constructing a separate sewer to carry surplus water from them to the sea, leaving the main river largely unaltered. The outfall sluice would have been located at Tarring Tenantry near Piddinghoe, and would contain three openings, two of 13 feet (4.0 m), each with a set of pointed doors facing in opposite directions, to prevent the sea entering the river, and to retain water in the river during dry periods. The third opening would be 14 feet (4.3 m) wide, with double pointed doors facing in both directions, so that it could additionally be used as a navigation lock at all states of the tide and river.

He estimated the cost of the first scheme to be £10,800, and the commissioners implemented some of his suggestions, improving the channels below Lewes in 1768, by dredging to remove shoals and making the channel wider in places. However, they did little to straighten the river, and Smeaton's great sluice was not constructed.

== Ouse navigation ==
The is some evidence that the Ouse was used for navigation in the early 18th century, as boats are marked on a map published in 1724, travelling to Maresfield Forge, to the north of Shortbridge. There is also a lock marked on the river, though this was presumably a flash lock. Smeaton's plan for a sluice and navigation lock at Piddinghoe had not been carried out, and the river remained free of tolls. The preamble to the River Ouse Navigation Act 1790 (30 Geo. 3. c. 52) indicated that the river was only used from the sea to Barcombe Mills at that time.

In 1788, the engineer William Jessop was asked to survey the river with a view to extending navigation. He suggested that the river could be made navigable to Pilstye Bridge, near the road from Cuckfield to Balcombe. It would be 4 feet (1.2 m) deep, and at least 24 feet (7.3 m) wide, enabling it to accommodate boats 45 by 12 feet (13.7 by 3.7 m), which could carry 30 tons. The work would involve easing sharp curves, widening the channel in places, making cuts to straighten some sections, and constructing 25 locks. He estimated that the work would cost £14,400, in addition to the costs associated with obtaining an act of Parliament, but was not entirely convinced that making the upper stretch navigable was sensible, and suggested that stopping the navigation at Lindfield would result in only 18 locks being needed, with the cost dropping to £9,271. Navigation of the river between Lewes and Newhaven was only normally possible when there were spring tides, and so he also suggested that this could be resolved by making the channel wider, deeper and straighter. This work would include a new cut some 1,000 yards (910 m) long, and would cost an additional £1,980, which included the cost of a towpath from Lewes to Piddinghoe, just to the north of Newhaven.

River Ouse Navigation Act 1790
- Act of Parliament
- Parliament of Great Britain
- Long title: An Act for improving, continuing, and extending the Navigation of the River Ouse, from Lewes Bridge, at the Town of Lewes, to Hammer Bridge, in the Parish of Cuckfield, and to the Extent of the said Parish of Cuckfield; and also of a Branch of the said River to Shortbridge, in the Parish of Fletching, in the County of Sussex.
- Citation: 30 Geo. 3. c. 52
- Territorial extent: Great Britain

Dates
- Royal assent: 28 April 1790
- Commencement: 21 January 1790 (Note: Start of session)
Other legislation
Amended by	River Ouse Navigation (Sussex) Act 1806; River Ouse Navigation Act 1814
Relates to	Lower Ouse Navigation Act 1791

Status: Amended

Text of statute as originally enacted

An act of Parliament, the River Ouse Navigation Act 1790 (30 Geo. 3. c. 52) was obtained on 28 April 1790, covering improvements to the river between Lewes Bridge and Hammer Bridge in Cuckfield, with a branch to Shortbridge. The Company of Proprietors of the River Ouse Navigation was created by the act, and they had powers to raise £25,000, by issuing £100 shares. Work on the river could not start until the proprietors had raised £10,000, and tolls could not be charged until some work had been done. On 6 June 1791 a second act of Parliament, the Lower Ouse Navigation Act 1791 (31 Geo. 3. c. 76) was obtained, covering the work between Lewes and Newhaven, for the purposes of improving navigation and also improving the drainage of the low-lying lands of the Lewes and Laughton Levels. The work was to be jointly supervised by some Trustees and the Commissioners of the Levels, who could then collect tolls for use of their part of the river.

River Ouse Navigation (Sussex) Act 1806
- Act of Parliament
- Parliament of the United Kingdom
- Long title: An Act for altering, amending and rendering more effectual, an Act passed in the Thirtieth Year of His present Majesty, for improving the Navigation of the River Ouse, in the County of Sussex.
- Citation: 46 Geo. 3. c. cxxii
- Territorial extent: United Kingdom

Dates
- Royal assent: 12 July 1806
- Commencement: 12 July 1806 (Note: The Acts of Parliament (Commencement) Act 1793.)
Other legislation
Amends	River Ouse Navigation Act 1790
Amended by	River Ouse Navigation Act 1814

Status: Amended

Text of statute as originally enacted

Contracts for work on the river above Lewes were advertised in May 1790, and were awarded to Pinkertons, who had worked with Jessop on a number of projects. However, by mid-1791, the committee was complaining that Pinkertons' work had been sub-standard and that some parts had failed. By April 1793, the navigation was open from Lewes to Sheffield Bridge, and some work on increasing the size of the channel had been carried out between there and Hammer Bridge. The construction costs had reached £20,000, but the tolls were meagre, averaging just £236 per year between 1793 and 1796. The navigation was in the hands of a receiver from 1797, but by 1805, enough funds had been raised to open another 1.5 miles (2.4 km) to Freshfield Bridge. Tolls increased sufficiently for the Proprietors to obtain another act of Parliament, the River Ouse Navigation (Sussex) Act 1806 (46 Geo. 3. c. cxxii) on 12 June 1806, which allowed them to raise another £30,000, and to abandon plans to proceed beyond Hammer Bridge. With new motivation, the Proprietors found an engineer in William Smith, the geologist who had formerly worked for the Somerset Coal Canal, and engaged Dymoke Wells to carry out the construction work. Wells was a local man, and agreed to take one-third of the payment as cash and the remainder as bonds and shares. The creditors who had installed a receiver were given bonds, and control of the navigation passed back to the Proprietors, who collected £751 in tolls during 1809. By the end of the year, the navigation had been extended to Lindfield Mill.

The proprietors then faced a dispute with the first Lord Sheffield, who, in their opinion, had overseen a period of stagnation, once the navigation had reached his wharf at Sheffield Bridge. Subsequently, he had quarrelled with the other proprietors and had sought to obstruct the project. The difficulties endured for several years, but eventually there was reconciliation with the second Lord Sheffield, who had a seat on the committee by 1823. The navigation reached its greatest extent of 22.5 miles (36.2 km) in 1812, when Wells constructed a further extension to Upper Ryelands Bridge at Balcombe, with similar payment terms to his previous contract. There was a 0.75-mile (1.2 km) branch to Shortbridge, and some shorter branches. There were 19 locks, although Hadfield only quotes 18, perhaps because there were two at Barcombe, identified as Pikesbridge Upper and Lower Lock on the 1875 map. Each was 52.5 by 13.5 feet (16.0 by 4.1 m), and the barges used on the navigation could carry 18 tons, suggesting that the channel was not as deep as Jessop had suggested, since his plan was for boats 45 by 12 feet (13.7 by 3.7 m) with a draught of 3.5 feet (1.1 m) which could carry 30 tons. Almost no records of the tolls collected are known to exist, but it appears that they were sufficient to pay interest on the money borrowed, but not to pay any dividends to the shareholders.

=== Lower river ===
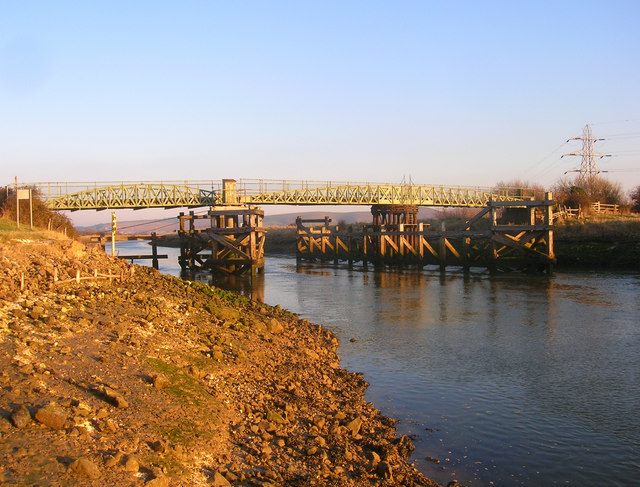
Southease swing bridge dates from 1880. It no longer opens.

Several attempts were made to improve the tidal river below Lewes. In March 1730, the engineer John Reynolds had surveyed the state of the timber pier at Newhaven, and reported to Parliament. The Newhaven Harbour Act 1730 (4 Geo. 2. c. 17) was obtained in 1731, and the harbour commissioners employed him to carry out renovation work, at a cost of £3,000. Over the next four years, piers were repaired and extended to control the channel, but Reynolds sluice at Piddinghoe, constructed between 1731 and 1733 and designed to hold back the water so that it could be used to scour the channel, failed and was removed in 1736.

Lower Ouse Navigation Act 1791
- Act of Parliament
- Parliament of Great Britain
- Long title: An Act for improving the Navigation of the River Ouse, between Newhaven Bridge and Lewes Bridge, in the County of Sussex, and for the better draining of the Low Lands lying in Lewes and Laughton Levels, in the said County.
- Citation: 31 Geo. 3. c. 76
- Territorial extent: Great Britain

Dates
- Royal assent: 6 June 1791
- Commencement: 10 August 1790
Other legislation
Relates to	River Ouse Navigation Act 1790

Status: Amended

Text of statute as originally enacted

The Lower Ouse Navigation Act 1791 (31 Geo. 3. c. 76), to straighten the channel below Lewes, was managed by Trustees and the Commissioners of the Lewes and Laughton Levels. Funding came from tolls on the river, and a drainage charge for landowners within the levels. There were clauses in the act to ensure that tolls could not be varied significantly without corresponding variations in the land drainage rates. The work on straightening and enlarging the lower river was carried out between 1791 and 1795, and Jessop's plans were overseen by a schoolmaster and civil engineer from Lewes called Cater Rand. The provision of a bridge at Southease was a requirement of the act, as the re-routing of the river divided farmland. In practice the costs to the landowners on the levels were too high, and another act of Parliament was obtained on 20 June 1800, which repealed the river tolls, and replaced them with higher tolls, to redress the balance.

From 1783, John Ellman, better known for his agricultural achievements, became the Expenditor for the Lewes and Laughton Levels, and as well as carrying out the tradition role of collecting the water scot tax and spending it, he worked tirelessly to organise and supervise work on the Glynde Reach and the lower Ouse, which enabled a 120-ton ship named Kitty to unload stone at Lewes Bridge in the late 1820s. He retired in 1828, and the following year the river flooded, but the results of the improvements were seen when the meadows drained in just 48 hours. Tapsfield's Shallow, near to Lewes Bridge, was finally removed by the engineer William Cubitt in 1838. Work on the west breakwater, a huge construction to protect the mouth of the river and enable ships to access the port of Newhaven at all states of the tide, began after a tramway link was constructed in 1866. It was completed in 1889, and the tramway was subsequently used to maintain the breakwater, until the tracks were lifted in 1963. For many years the locomotive used on the tramway was No. 72 Fenchurch, now preserved on the Bluebell Railway, which runs from Sheffield Park on the upper river to East Grinstead.

=== Operation ===
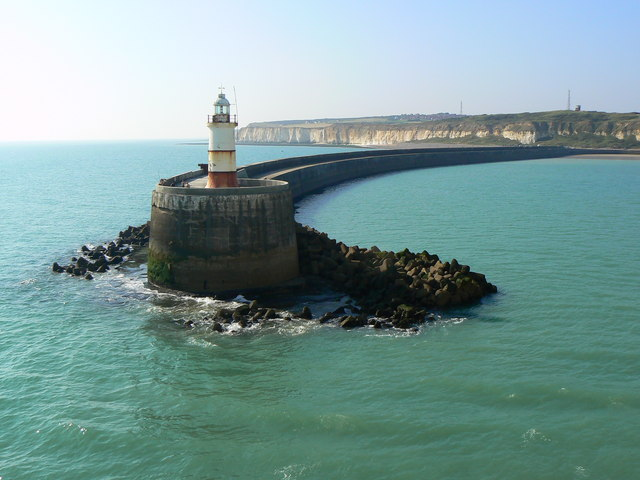
The west breakwater prevents shingle from blocking the mouth of the river at Newhaven

Trade along the Ouse Navigation consisted mostly of lime, chalk, manure, aggregates and coal. Whilst in 1801 there were 51 barges registered as trading on the river, of which 21 worked on the section above Lewes, the navigation was never a huge commercial success. In 1825 there was a proposal for a canal from Lewes to Brighton, which would have left the river at Lewes, risen through 29 locks, and required a 2.5-mile (4.0 km) tunnel to reach Brighton, but no further action was taken. Competition arrived in the early 1840s, when the London and Brighton Railway was built. Initially, this provided some trade, as 11 million bricks from the Netherlands were transported along the Ouse for the construction of the Ouse Valley Viaduct at Haywards Heath. There is some evidence that goods were carried up the navigation and transferred to the railway, but this practice was short lived, as the coastal railway from Brighton to Lewes opened in 1846. Receipts in that year were about £800, a drop from around £1,200 in the 1810s, and despite significant reductions in tolls, traffic dwindled rapidly. The death-knell occurred in 1858, when the Lewes to Uckfield branch line opened, running parallel to the river for much of its route, and in 1859, the company stopped keeping records. The navigation above Lindfield was disused by 1861, and the last barge to Lindfield sailed in 1868, after which there was no trade above Lewes, although boats continued working on the Lower Ouse below Lewes.

A major user of the lower river was the Southerham Cement Works, located on the east bank of the river just above Lewes railway bridge. A chalk pit is known to have existed there since at least 1725, and it became a cement works in the 19th century, as the demand for building materials grew. The works had its own fleet of barges, which were used to transport coal, coke and clay to the site, and to carry lime and cement away from it. Although it had been connected to the railway by sidings since at least 1875, barges continued to serve the works until the 1950s.

=== Management ===
With the passing of the Land Drainage Act 1930, most rivers were managed by a catchment board, with the land drainage functions handled by an internal drainage board (IDB). The Commissioners of the Lewes and Laughton Levels effectively became an IDB until a new structure could be created. This happened in 1939, but rather than creating an independent IDB, flood management of the Ouse became the responsibility of the River Ouse Catchment Board (internal drainage). During the successive reorganisations of the water industry, responsibility passed to the East Sussex River Board, the Sussex River Authority, and the Southern Water Authority. When the water companies were privatised in 1989, rivers became the responsibility of the National Rivers Authority, and when the Environment Agency replaced that organisation in 1995, they managed the River Ouse Internal Drainage District (IDD), together with five other IDDs in Sussex. In 2012, the Environment Agency decided that these functions would be better served by locally accountable organisations, and consulted local authorities as to how best this could be achieved.

River Ouse (Sussex) Internal Drainage District Order 2016 (Note: Section 1(1).)
- Statutory Instrument
- Parliament of the United Kingdom
- Citation: SI 2016/791
- Territorial extent: United Kingdom

Dates
- Made: 18 July 2016
- Commencement: 31 March 2017
Other legislation
Made under	Land Drainage Act 1991

Status: Current legislation

Text of statute as originally enacted

Text of the River Ouse (Sussex) Internal Drainage District Order 2016 as in force today (including any amendments) within the United Kingdom, from legislation.gov.uk.

Lewes District Council, who contributed £131,000 annually to the work of the IDD, opposed the setting up of an independent Internal Drainage Board. East Sussex County Council, who act as the local flood authority, were initially worried that this might result in their costs rising, but Lewes Council stated that they would use any savings made from not supporting an Internal Drainage Board to fund flood and coastal erosion management. Subsequently, the River Ouse (Sussex) Internal Drainage District Order 2016 (SI 2016/791) was passed by Parliament on 18 July 2016, which abolished the River Ouse Internal Drainage District as from 31 March 2017, without creating a formal body to replace it.

The work carried out to improve the river has not removed the risk of flooding, and there have been major flood events in 1960, 1979, 1987, 1993 and 2000, which have affected people living in Lewes, Uckfield, Haywards Heath and Lindfield. The river is embanked below Barcombe Mills, and although this primarily protects agricultural land, it also offers some protection to around 2,000 properties. Following the floods of 1960, a further round of widening the channel and raising the banks below Lewes occurred, and where gravity drainage of the levels has proved ineffective, water is pumped into the river from land drainage ditches. Tidal water has been unable to enter the Laughton Level since 1973, when a dam and pumping station was constructed across the Glynde Reach at Beddingham. There are land drainage pumping stations at Stoneham, Offham, Rodmell, ET Wadham, Ranscombe, Denton and Beddingham, with an eighth station at Lewes which pumps water into the Malling Drain.

=== Legacy ===
On the upper river, the remains of most of the old locks are still visible, although all are gradually deteriorating. The Sussex Ouse Conservation Society promotes awareness of the navigation, and publishes details of circular walks which include river sections. For serious walkers, the Sussex Ouse Valley Way is a long-distance footpath which follows the course of the river. It begins near its source at Horsham, and is 42 miles (68 km) long, ending at the sea near Seaford. The Sussex Ouse Restoration Trust was formed in 2001, with the long-term aim of seeing navigation restored to the upper river, and have completed work on restoring Isfield Lock. However, the Ouse and Adur Rivers Trust see this aim as a threat to the ecology of the river.

== Milling ==
The river has been used as a source of power, with nine mills known to have existed on the main channel, with four more on the Shortbridge Stream, three on the Bevern Stream, and a tide mill at Bishopstone, to the east of Newhaven. The northernmost of the mills on the main channel was Fletching Mill. A forge was operational at the site in 1574, but was replaced by a corn mill when the iron industry declined. This was replaced by a three-storey brick and timber building at some point, which was later supplemented by a four-storey square extension with a flat roof, from which the owners, the Maryon-Wilson family, could watch cricket matches at Sheffield Park. While the navigation was in use, there was a wharf just to the north of the mill, where barges moored to deliver grain or collect produce. The mill ceased to use water power in the 1920s, when Tidy & Sons owned it, but was in use until 1940, when the War Office requisitioned it to billet soldiers in it. Much of the fabric of the building was damaged during this period, and it was only used irregularly after the war, until it was demolished in 1950, as was the hump-back bridge at the front of the building.

Between 1813 and 1816, a local papermaker called James Pim bought a property called "Sharp's" in Newick, and built a paper mill close to Sharp's Bridge Lock. He was the only occupant of the building, and by the time it was offered for sale in 1853, the details in the sale documents make it clear that paper making had ceased. They noted that the mill was next to a wharf, and that it was powered by a single engine. No buyer was found, and the mill had been demolished by the time the 1874 Ordnance Survey map was published. There is still a "Sharp's Bridge House" near to the bridge, which was probably the property bought by Pim in 1813.

Isfield Paper Mill was built on a 2-acre (0.81 ha) site next to Isfield Lock, which the proprietors of the navigation offered for sale in 1793. Molineux and Johnston bought the land and built a large mill, for which the opening ceremony in July 1809 was a grand affair, according to the Sussex Weekly Advertiser. Success was fairly short-lived, as it was offered for sale in 1855, together with Molineux and Johnston's other mill at Lewes. Neither mill was sold, and the building materials from a foreman's cottage, nine other cottages, stone from the leats and two large cast iron waterwheels were sold at auction on 28 September 1857. There is some evidence for another mill further downstream, as Isfield Old Mill appears on Greenwood's map of 1823, and the 1874 Ordnance Survey map shows details of the leats, but it was not mentioned on the Tithe Apportionment of 1840, which is usually a reliable source of information. It was probably dismantled in the late 18th century.

At Barcombe there were two mills, the most northerly of which was known as Barcombe Oil Mill, although this hid the fact that it was also used for milling corn. It was established soon after the navigation opened in 1793, and the mill was unusual in its location, in that most oil production took place in East Anglia. Seeds were crushed by edge rolling millstones, and then held in linen bags to be beaten by trip hammers. The process was initially powered by waterwheel, but subsequently a 28 hp (21 kW) beam engine was installed, and by 1880 was driving 16 hydraulic presses. Oil was used in the production of soap and paint, while oil cake was used as cattle feed, fertiliser and fuel. Much of the mill was destroyed by fire on 6 June 1854, when slicks of burning oil floated downstream and threatened Barcombe Mill. The cost of the repairs was estimated to be between £7,000 and £8,000, but the mill was rebuilt and continued trading. When offered for sale in 1880, it could produce 80 tons of oil cake and 200 quarters of wheat per week. The beam engine supplemented two breastshot water wheels, one made of iron and the other of wood. The mill was served by a siding on the Lewes to Uckfield Railway after the demise of the navigation, continuing in use until at least 1911, and was demolished around 1917.

Barcombe Mill was considerably older, as Thomas Erith had a fulling mill in the 16th century. It was used as a corn mill and paper mill prior to the owner becoming bankrupt in 1706. It developed once the navigation provided transport links, enabling flour and produce to reach Lewes to the south and several villages to the north. The owners at the time were Thomas Rickman & Son, who also owned Barcombe Oil Mill. A siding from the mill to Barcombe Mills railway station revolutionised transport, and a new, larger mill was built in 1870, with four floors and powered by two enclosed water wheels. It could produce 500 to 600 sacks of flour each week. Ownership passed to William Catt & Sons in 1879, who also ran the tide mill at Bishopstone, and in 1894 they installed a Turner five-sack roller mill. A 60 hp (45 kW) compound engine was used to power the roller mill, while three pairs of millstones were driven by a "Little Giant" turbine. Milling ceased in 1918, and after a period of dereliction, it was used to manufacture buttons, made by slicing Italian nuts. Button production started in 1931, but the mill building was destroyed by fire in March 1939. It had been one of the biggest watermills in Sussex, but little remains apart from the four channels, while a grass mound where the main building was conceals an atmospheric syphon installed in the 1960s, which is used to force water downstream when the river is in spate.

Continuing downstream, Germany Mill was built near the village of Hamsey in 1744. When the navigation was constructed, the course of the river was altered, and the mill lost its water supply. The three-storey brick and flint building still exists, but is now used for drying grain. Lewes Paper Mill was owned by Messrs Molineux, Johnston & Lee, and operated from 1802 until its demolition in 1825. A large flour mill powered by steam was built on the site in 1860, but was short-lived, closing in 1868. Burgeon's map dating from 1724 mentions a tide mill at Lewes, but no other references to it are known to exist.

The final mill was Bishopstone Tide Mill, located a little to the east of the present mouth of the river. The Duke of Newcastle, Thomas Pelham, obtained the Bishopstone Tide Mills Act 1762 (2 Geo. 3. c. 12 Pr.) to authorise construction of the mill on the foreshore of land that he owned at Bishopstone. The first mill was completed in 1788, by which time Pelham had died. It was sold in 1791 to Thomas Barton, and the sale documents listed five pairs of stones, capable of producing 130 quarters of week each week. The new owner built a large mill with three storeys, capable of producing 1,500 sacks of flour each week, using 16 pairs of stones. The site was regularly affected by storms, with wheat and flour destroyed in 1792, while in 1820, the building was damaged and part of the dam was washed away. After 1853, the volume of flour produced gradually declined, often as a result of weather conditions, but it continued in operation until March 1883, when there was another violent storm and the new harbour at Newhaven required more water. The site which was known as Tide Mills was much more than just the mill buildings, as 60 men were employed, and William Catt, the owner until his death in 1853, built cottages for his workers and a school for the children. Transport of the flour to markets improved when the Newhaven to Seaford railway line opened, and the mill was served by a siding. Some of the buildings remained in use for various purposes until the end of the Second World War, but virtually nothing remains of what was the largest water mill in Sussex.

== Culture ==
The author Virginia Woolf drowned herself in the River Ouse on 28 March 1941, near the village of Rodmell; her body was recovered from the river on 18 April. Olivia Laing's book, To the River: A Journey Beneath the Surface, was published in 2011; walking the length of the Ouse, Laing reflects upon Woolf's life and upon the relationship between history and place.

== See also ==
- Rivers of Great Britain
- Canals of Great Britain
- History of the British canal system
- Media related to River Ouse, Sussex at Wikimedia Commons

Prendergast, H.D.V. (2019). Ouse and Uck. Sketch of a Sussex Catchment. Essedon Press, Wych Cross, East Sussex.

== Bibliography ==
- Agency (2009). "River Ouse Catchment Flood Management Plan" (PDF). Environment Agency. Archived (PDF) from the original on 25 July 2019.
- Blackwell, John (2002). "Keymer Junction To Seaford". Sussex Main Lines - A Year 2002 Survey. Sussex Industrial Archaeological Society. Archived from the original on 26 April 2018.
- Body, Geoffrey (1989). Railway of the Southern Region. Patrick Stephens. ISBN 978-1-85260-297-0.
- Brandon, P. F. (1971). "The Origin of Newhaven and the Drainage of the Lewes and Laughton Levels". Sussex Archaeological Collections. 109: 94–106. doi:10.5284/1086029.
- Brandon, P; Short, B (1990). The South-East from AD 1000. Routledge. ISBN 978-0-582-49245-5.
- Brent, Colin (1993). Georgian Lewes 1714-1830: The Heyday of a Country Town. Colin Brent Books. ISBN 978-0-9522423-0-7.
- Cumberlidge, Jane (2009). Inland Waterways of Great Britain (8th Ed.). Imray Laurie Norie and Wilson. ISBN 978-1-84623-010-3.
- Fisher, Stuart (2012). The Rivers of Britain: Estuaries, Tideways, Havens, Lochs, Firths and Kyles. Adlard Coles Nautical. ISBN 978-1-4081-4656-9.
- Hadfield, Charles (1969). The Canals of South and South East England. David and Charles. ISBN 978-0-7153-4693-8.
- NRA (October 1991). "The River Ouse" (PDF). National Rivers Authority. Archived (PDF) from the original on 23 April 2018.
- OART (Winter 2015). "Newsletter" (PDF). Ouse and Adur Rivers Trust. Archived (PDF) from the original on 22 September 2015.
- Peck, Mika; et al. (5 November 2009). "Sediments are major sinks of steroidal estrogens in two United Kingdom rivers". Environmental Toxicology and Chemistry. 23 (4). Society of Environmental Toxicology and Chemistry: 945–52. doi:10.1897/03-41. PMID 15095890. S2CID 20605705.
- Priestley, Joseph (1831). "Historical Account of the Navigable Rivers, Canals and Railways of Great Britain". Archived from the original on 3 March 2016.
- Robinson, D A; Williams, R B G (1983). "Chapter 3. The Sussex Coast Past and Present" (PDF). In Sutton, Alan (ed.). Sussex: Environment, Landscape and Society. Sussex University. Archived (PDF) from the original on 12 July 2018.
- Skempton, Sir Alec; et al. (2002). A Biographical Dictionary of Civil Engineers in Great Britain and Ireland: Vol 1: 1500 to 1830. Thomas Telford. ISBN 978-0-7277-2939-2.
- Smeaton, John (1812). Miscellaneous Papers of John Smeaton. Longman, Hurst, Rees, Orme and Brown.
- Stidder, Derek; Smith, Colin (1997). Watermills of Sussex. Vol. 1. Baron Birch. ISBN 978-0-86023-569-9.
- Woodcock, A. (2003). "The archaeological implications of coastal change in Sussex". In Rudling, D. (ed.). The Archaeology of Sussex to AD2000. Heritage, University of Sussex. ISBN 978-0-9544456-1-4.
