= John Ellman =

John Ellman (17 October 1753 – 22 November 1832) was an English farmer and stock breeder who developed the Southdown breed of sheep.

== Biography ==
=== Early life ===
John Ellman was born on 17 October 1753 in Hartfield, Sussex. He moved with his family to Place Farm in Glynde in 1761.

=== Career ===
He inherited the tenancy to the farm with his father's death in 1780, and devoted the largest part of his time and land to rearing the local Southdown breed, changing it from a tall, lean sheep into a more squat and compact one which gave excellent mutton yield while retaining a good fleece. His work would eventually be continued by Jonas Webb of Cambridgeshire to produce the modern form of the breed.

He was well regarded by his contemporaries, and won prizes with ease at local and national livestock shows. He was well connected, with several peers regularly corresponding with him for the advice on farming which he would give freely, was introduced to George III, and sold two of his rams to Emperor Paul I of Russia for 300 guineas.

John Ellman wrote broadly on agricultural subjects, contributing to works such as Arthur Young's Annals of Agriculture and Baxter's Library of Agricultural and Horticultural Knowledge. He was a founder member of the Sussex Agricultural Society and Smithfield Society.

He took great interest in local affairs as a commissioner of taxes and expenditor of Lewes and Laughton Levels, and played a role in the improvement of navigation on the River Ouse and in the redevelopment of Newhaven Harbour. He was also a progressive employer who maintained a school for workers' children in Glynde.

He retired in 1829 and his flock was broken up at auction.

=== Death ===
He died in 1832 in Lewes. His tomb is in Glynde churchyard.
