= Laughton, East Sussex =

Village in East Sussex, England

Coordinates: 50.90°N 0.13°E

Laughton
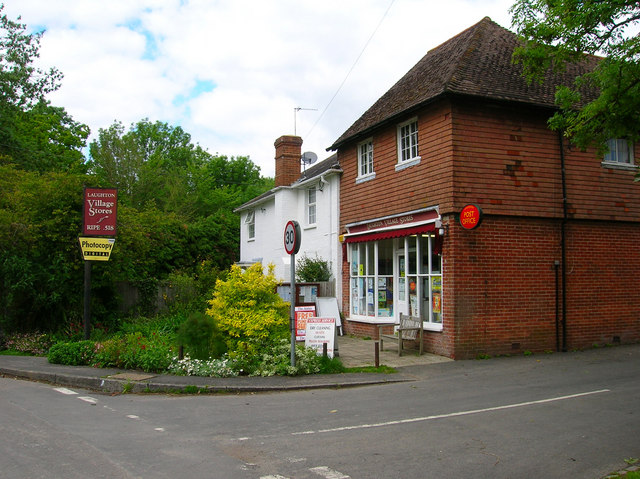

- Location within East Sussex
- Area: 19.0 km^{2} (7.3 sq mi)
- Population: 599 (Parish-2011)
  - Density: 80/sq mi (31/km^{2})
- OS grid reference: TQ501131
  - London: 43 miles (69 km) NNW
- Civil parish: Laughton
- District: Wealden
- Shire county: East Sussex
- Region: South East
- Country: England
- Sovereign state: United Kingdom
- Post town: LEWES
- Postcode district: BN8
- Dialling code: 01323
- Police: Sussex
- Fire: East Sussex
- Ambulance: South East Coast
- UK Parliament: Lewes

Laughton is a village and civil parish in the Wealden district of East Sussex, England. The village is located five miles (8 km) east of Lewes, at a junction on the minor road to Hailsham (B2124). It appears in the Domesday Book, and there are Roman remains nearby.

== History ==
The village sign refers to the village as the "Village of the Buckle". This is a reference to the buckle on the Pelhams' coat of arms.

The buckle was a gift from the king to Nicholas Pelham in reward for leading a group of men from Seaford and local landowners to repulse a small French fleet that attempted to land in Seaford Bay in 1545. The area of the battle, at the western end of Seaford seafront, is, consequently, now known as The Buckle.

The patronage of the church was held by the Earl of Chichester.

== Landmarks ==
The Site of Special Scientific Interest Park Corner Heath lies within the parish. It is a 8.7 acres (3.5 ha) site of biological interest consisting of grassy heath, scrub and woodland. It provides a habitat for many species of moth and butterfly.

Henry Pelham and Thomas Pelham-Holles, 1st Duke of Newcastle, successive 18th-century Prime Ministers of the United Kingdom, were buried together at All Saints' Church in Laughton. Their family had been the local landowners since the early sixteenth century.

Laughton Manor is a Grade II listed manor house, built 1760–1780.

Education is provided at the Laughton Community Primary School. The parish church is dedicated to All Saints. The Roebuck Inn, on the Lewes Road, provides accommodation and food.

All Saints Church was first built in the 13thc. https://sussexparishchurches.org/church/laughton-all-saints/
