= List of places in East Sussex =

This is a list of cities, towns and villages in the county of East Sussex, England.

== A ==
- Alciston, Alfriston, Arlington

== B ==
- Baldslow, Barcombe, Barcombe Cross, Barcombe Mills, Battle, Beachy Head, Beachy Head West, Beckley, Beckley Furnace, Belmont, Bells Yew Green, Belmont, Berwick, Best Beech Hill, Bexhill-on-Sea, Birling Gap, Bishopstone, Blackham, Bodiam, Bodle Street Green, Boreham Street, Brede, Brighton, Broadland Row, Broad Oak Brede, Broad Oak Heathfield, Burwash, Buxted

== C ==
- Camber, Chailey Common, Cliffe Hill, Clive Vale, Cock Marling, Cooper's Green, Cripps Corner, Crowborough, Chiddingly, Chailey, Cooksbridge, Cowbeech

== D ==
- Dallington, Darwell Reservoir, Denton, Ditchling, Doleham, Downside, Duddleswell

== E ==
- Eastbourne, East Blatchington, East Dean, East Guldeford, Eridge Green, Etchingham, Etchingwood, Exceat

== F ==
- Fairwarp, Falmer, Filching, Five Ash Down, Fletching, Folkington, Forest Row, Frant

== G ==
- Gensing, Golden Cross, Groombridge, Gun Hill

== H ==
- Hadlow Down, Hailsham, Hammerwood, Hampden Park, Hangleton, Hankham, Hartfield, Hastings, Heathfield, Herstmonceux, High Hurstwood, Hollington, Hove Park

== I ==
- Icklesham, Iden, Iford, Isfield

== J ==
- Jarvis Brook, Jevington

== K ==
- Kingston near Lewes

== L ==
- Langney, Lewes, Little Horsted, Lower Dicker, Lower Willingdon (see Willingdon and Jevington), Litlington, Lullington

== M ==
- Magham Down, Maresfield, Mayfield, Maynard's Green, Meads

== N ==
- Netherfield, Newhaven, Newhaven Seaplane Base, Newick, Normans Bay, Northiam, Norton, Nutley

== O ==
Ore (Hastings)

== P ==
- Peacehaven, Pevensey, Pevensey Bay, Piddinghoe, Piltdown, Playden, Plumpton Racecourse, Polegate, Portslade, Poundgate, Preston, Brighton

== Q ==
- Quadrophenia Alley, Queen's Park (Brighton ward)

== R ==
- Ridgewood, Ringmer, River Uck, Robertsbridge, Rock-a-Nore, Rodmell, Roser's Cross, Rottingdean, Royal Military Canal Path, Royal Sovereign shoal, Rushlake Green, Rye, Rye Foreign, Rye Harbour, Rye Harbour SSSI

== S ==
- Salehurst and Robertsbridge, Saltdean, Seaford, Seahaven, Sedlescombe, Sidley, Silver Hill, Southease, Southern Sandstone, South Heighton, Sunnyside, Sutton, St Ann Without, St Anthony's Hill (Eastbourne), Stone Cross, Sussex Downs AONB, Sussex Ouse Valley Way

== T ==
- Telscombe, Telscombe Cliffs, Ticehurst, Tarring Neville, Three Cups Corner

== U ==
- River Uck, Uckfield, Udimore, Upper Hartfield

== V ==
- Vines Cross

== W ==
- Wadhurst, Wannock, Wartling, Westham, West Hill, Brighton, Willingdon, Wilmington, Winchelsea, Winchelsea Beach, Windmill Hill, Withdean, Withyham, Witherenden Hill, Woodingdean Water Well

== See also ==
- List of settlements in East Sussex by population
- List of places in England
