= Cuckmere Valley =

Civil parish in East Sussex, England

Coordinates: 50.80°N 0.16°E

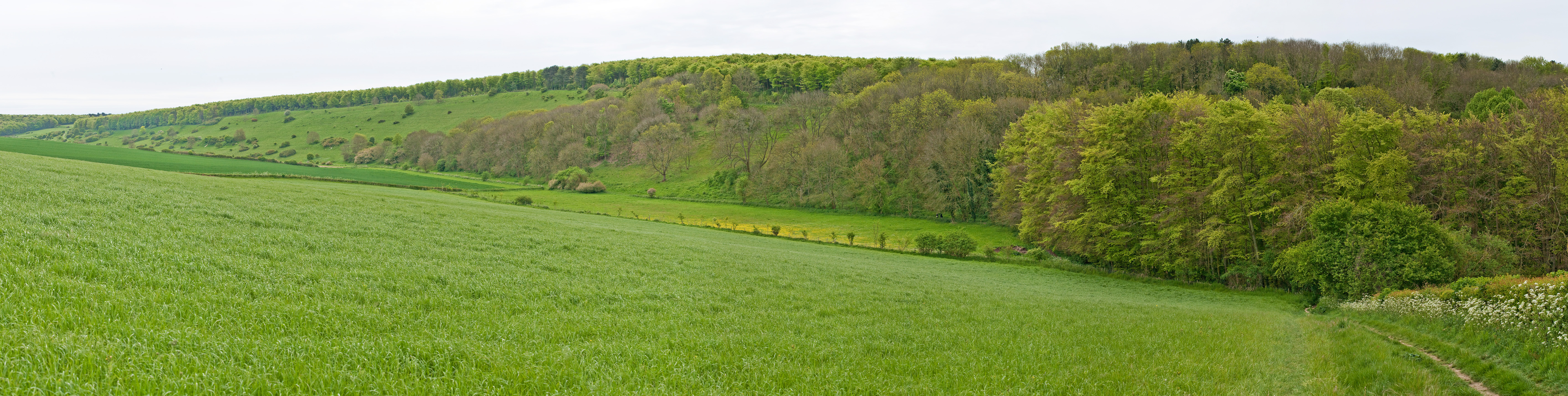
- A panoramic view across the Cuckmere Valley along the South Downs Way

- Location within East Sussex
- Area: 17.6 km^{2} (6.8 sq mi)
- Population: 191 (2011)
  - Density: 30/sq mi (12/km^{2})
- OS grid reference: TQ523017
  - London: 50 miles (80 km) NNW
- Civil parish: Cuckmere Valley
- District: Wealden
- Shire county: East Sussex
- Region: South East
- Country: England
- Sovereign state: United Kingdom
- Post town: POLEGATE
- Postcode district: BN26
- Dialling code: 01323
- Police: Sussex
- Fire: East Sussex
- Ambulance: South East Coast
- UK Parliament: Lewes; Eastbourne

Cuckmere Valley is a civil parish in the Wealden district of East Sussex, England. As its name suggests, the parish consists of a number of small settlements on the eastern side of the lower reaches of the River Cuckmere.

== The settlements ==
There are three villages in the civil parish of Cuckmere Valley: Litlington, Lullington and Westdean. Archaeological remains nearer the coast at Exceat suggest a further settlement there in former times. The civil parish of Cuckmere Valley was created in 1990 when Litlington, Lullington and Westdean parishes were abolished, with small areas transferred between Litlington and Alfriston, which remained a separate civil parish.

=== Litlington ===
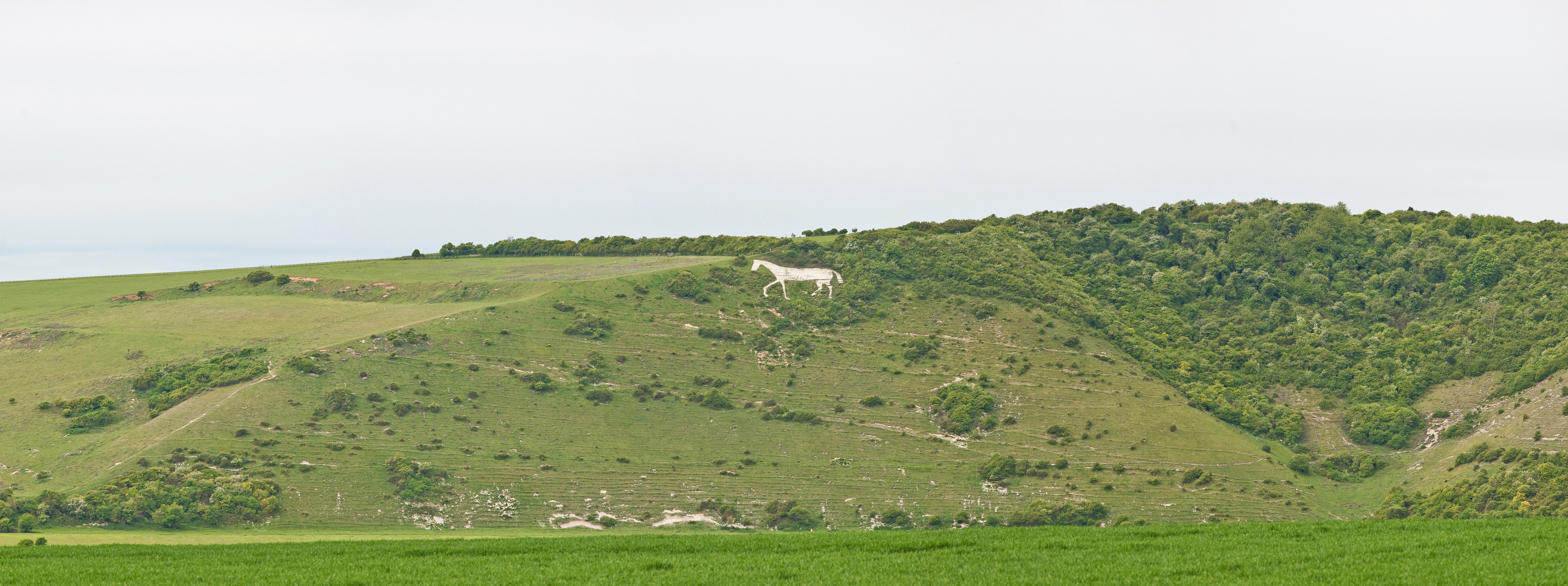
Chalk horse figure near Litlington

The name is Saxon, and probably indicates Litl's homestead. The twelfth- century church is dedicated to St Michael the Archangel.

Maria Fitzherbert (1756–1837), mistress of George IV, lived at Clapham House in the village.

In 1924 a chalk figure of a horse was cut into the downs to the west of the village, replacing one cut in the 19th century. The village inn is the Plough and Harrow.

=== Lullington ===
Lullington is the most northerly of the villages in Cuckmere Valley, about 10 miles (16 km) southeast of Lewes. It lies on a shoulder of the South Downs at the point where the River Cuckmere cuts through the downs, on the opposite bank of the river to Alfriston. A medieval village, Lullington Court, was abandoned after the Black Death in the 14th century; its site was to the east of the present Lullington. The church, dedicated to the Good Shepherd, is believed to be the smallest in England, having been rebuilt using only the original chancel after a fire had destroyed the remainder of the building. Services are held only in the summer months, as the building has no electricity.

=== Westdean ===
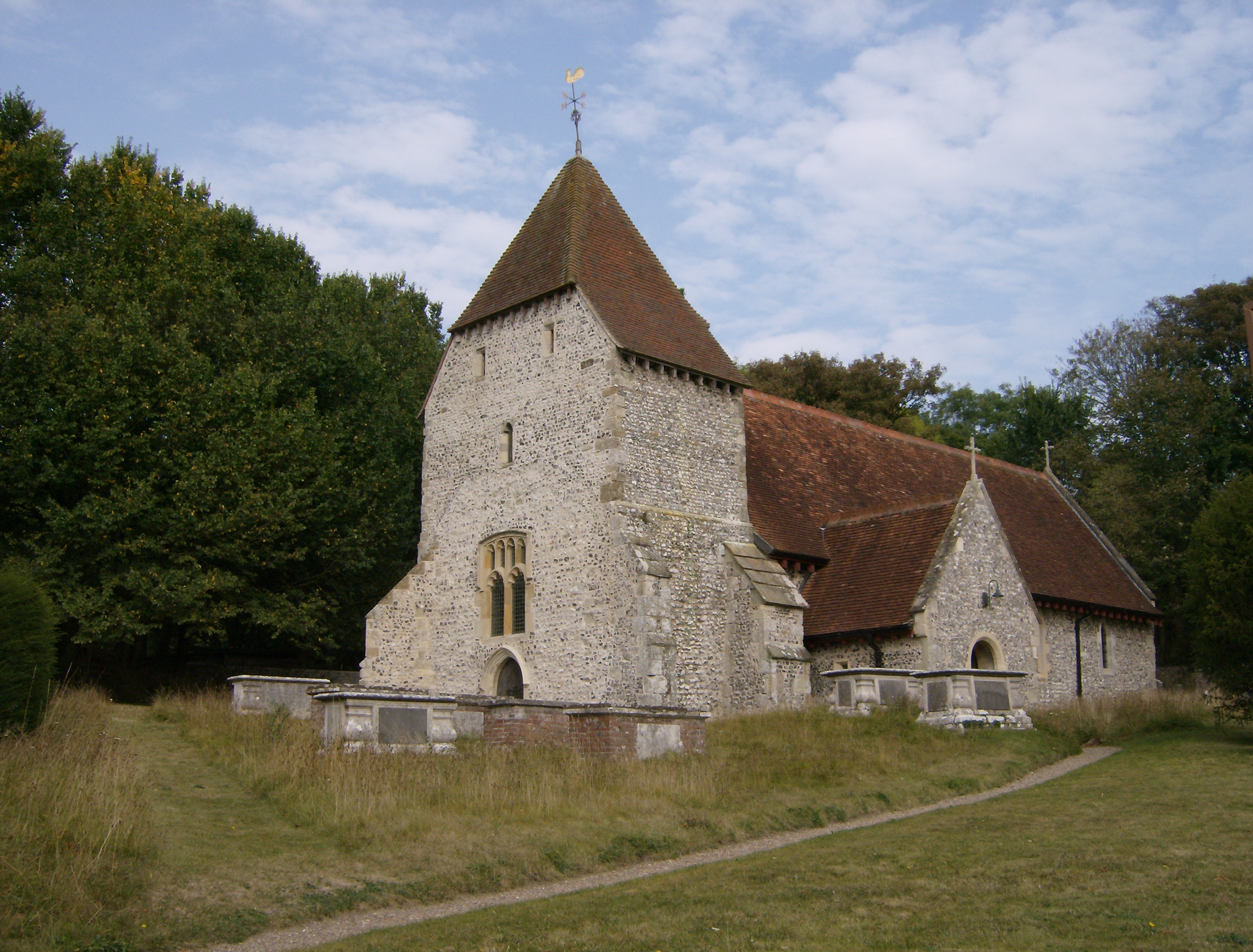
All Saints Church, Westdean

Westdean (or West Dean) is a village located on the edge of Friston Forest. Its church is dedicated to All Saints and has Saxon origins (a Saxon era window is in the north wall). Next door to the church is "The Old Parsonage", a medieval flint and stone home. It was built by Benedictine monks in 1280 and continuously occupied since that period although the clergy vacated in the 1970s and it is now a private home. Opposite the church is the remains of the Norman era manor, although a Norman era dovecote is well maintained. The South Downs Way walking trail passes through West Dean.

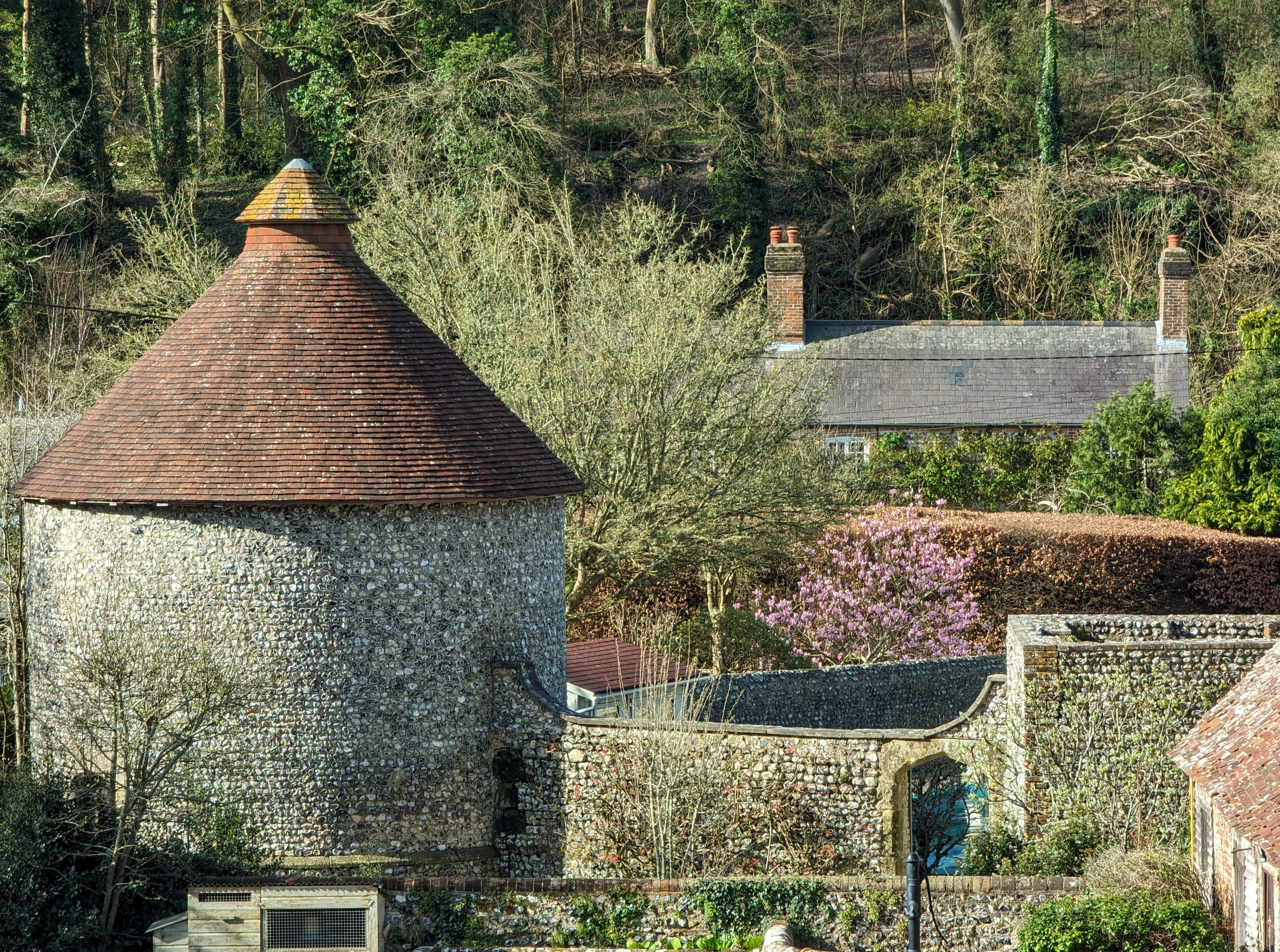
The Dovecote at West Dean, East Sussex.

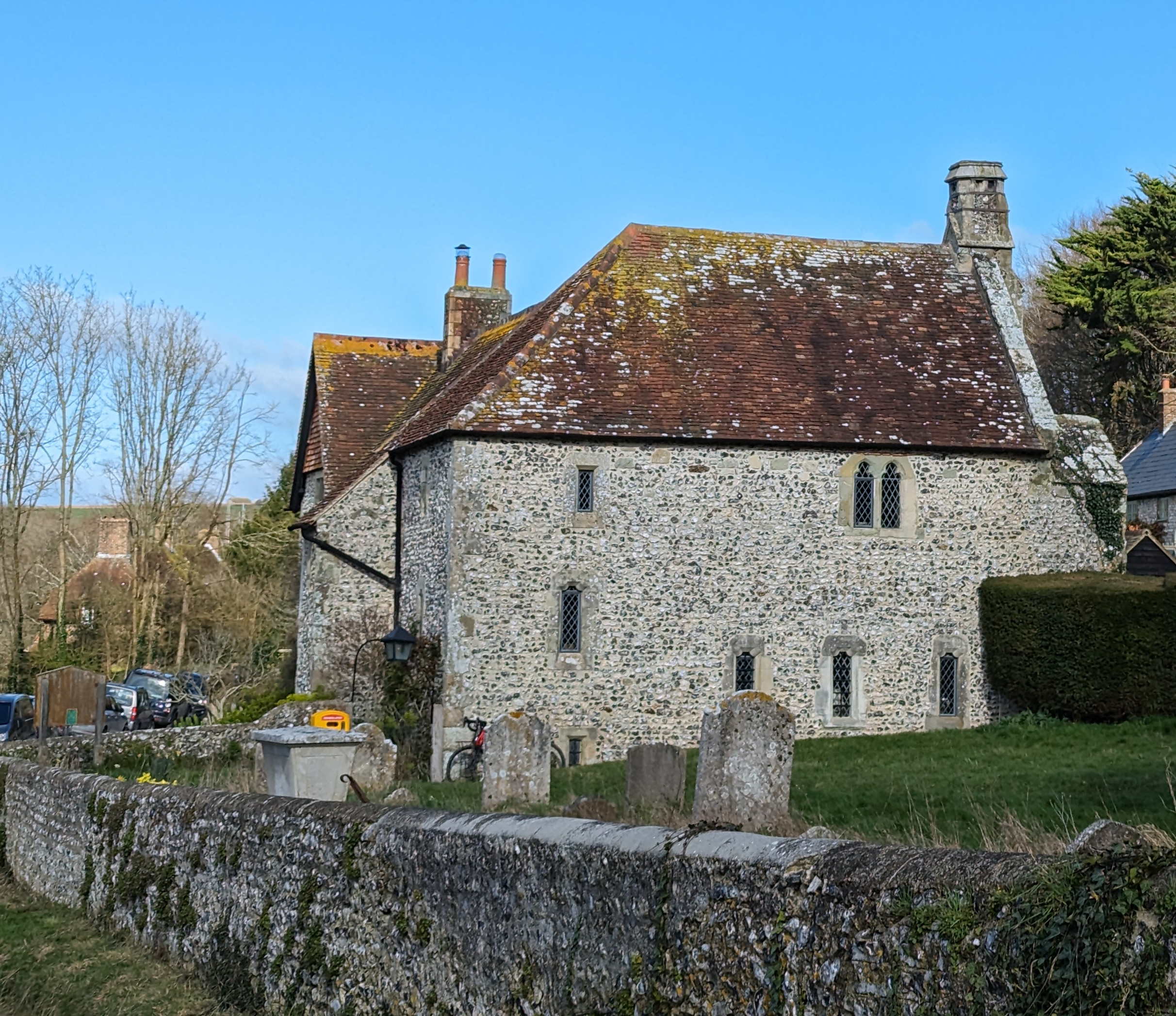
The Old Parsonage at West Dean, East Sussex.

=== Exceat ===
Exceat (/ɛkˈsiːt/ ek-SEET) was an ancient village. The A259 goes by it just east of the River Cuckmere. The name may have come from æc-sceat, an oak grove, or from the Old English for "the place of the Aese", early kings of Kent whilst another etymology is possible from Brittonic wysg meaning water or river (or possibly "esgair meaning ridge) and ceat meaning woods, hence "Wooded River" or "Wooded Ridge". After the Norman conquest, the village was given to Robert, Count of Mortain, half brother of William the Conqueror. Both Exceat and the land were given later to Grestein Priory in Wilmington.

Until the 14th century, Exceat was an important village with its own church. The village suffered French raids; it suffered many fatalities during the Black Death, as was effectively abandoned by the 15th century.

The main features are the Visitors Centre for the nearby Seven Sisters and the Cuckmere Inn pub across Exceat Bridge over the Cuckmere.

== Landmarks ==
The National Trust owns land on the western side of the river south of the A259.

In addition, there are three Sites of Special Scientific Interest within the parish; Seaford to Beachy Head, Wilmington Downs and Lullington Heath. Seaford to Beachy Head is a large site of biological and geological importance. The area contains a wide variety of habitats based on the chalk bedrock, which hosts a wide range of flora and fauna, including some nationally rare species. Wilmington Downs is another area of biological interest; its chalk grassland is habitat for several rare species. Lullington Heath is also of biological interest due to its chalk heath and grassland habitats.

== See also ==
- Cuckmere Haven
