= A271 road =

Road in East Sussex, England

A271

Major junctions
- East end: Battle
- A2100 A269 A295; A22
- West end: Lower Horsebridge (near Hailsham)

Location
- Country: United Kingdom
- Constituent country: England
- Primary destinations: Hastings; Eastbourne

Road network
- Roads in the United Kingdom; Motorways; A and B road zones

The A271 road is a main road through East Sussex, England. It runs east–west from the A2100 in Battle to the A22 and A267 at Horsebridge near Hailsham.

The road starts at a roundabout in Battle. It continues through the suburbs into some wooded countryside and later on the road comes to a junction with the A269. The bendy road continues through Boreham Street and Windmill Hill. It then enters Herstmonceux, coming out of the village down a hill it then comes up to Magham Down. The road then enters Hailsham meeting the A295 and the B2104 and then goes into Lower Horsebridge meeting the A22.

The eastern end of this road was renumbered sometime after 1980 – originally the eastern end of the A271 was at Ninfield where it met the A269 which went to Battle via Catsfield (now the B2204). The current route of the A271 follows what was the B2204 and A269.
