= Three Oaks railway station =

Railway station in East Sussex, England

Three Oaks
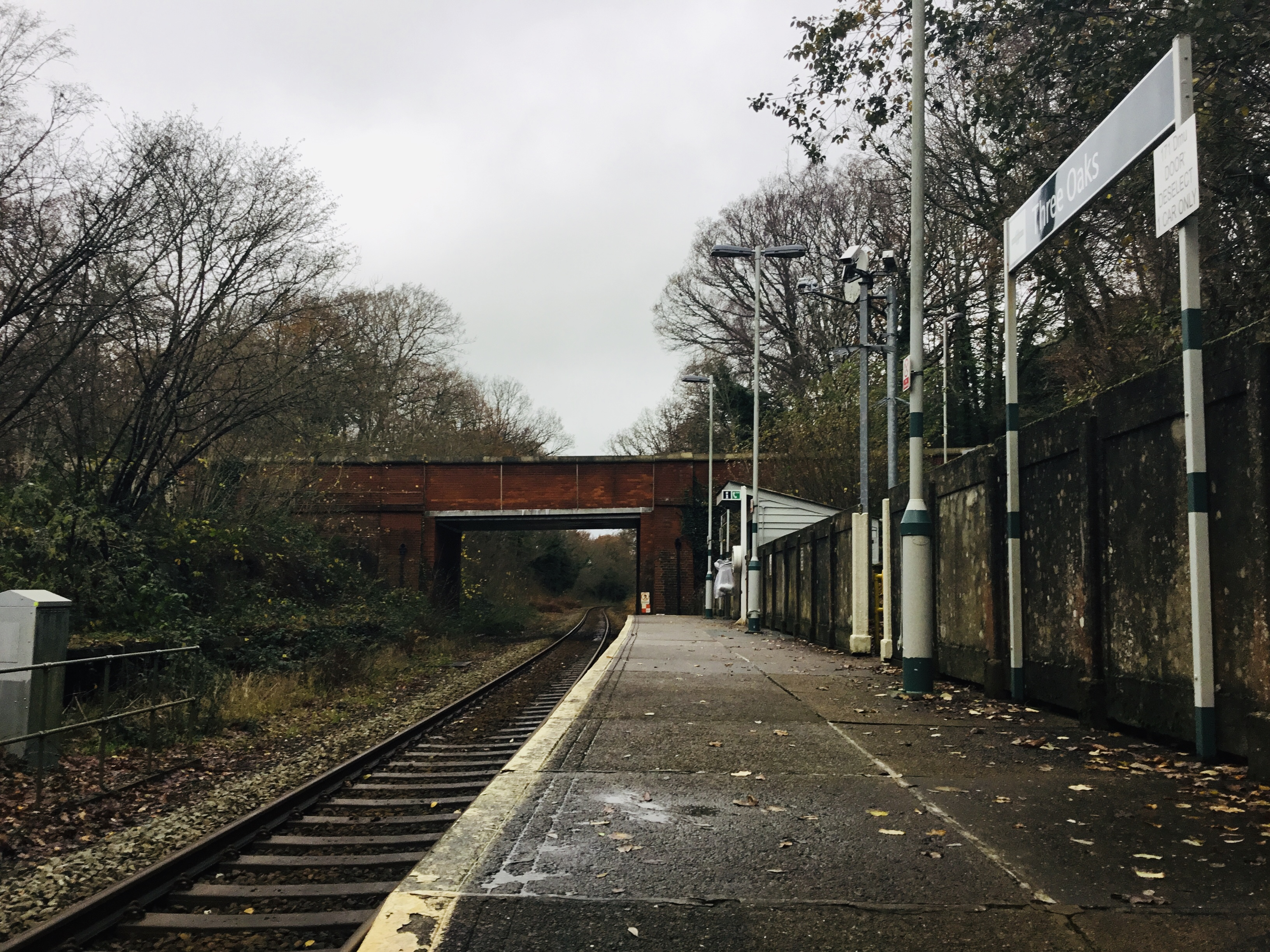
- Platform looking north in December 2018

General information
- Location: Three Oaks, Rother; England
- Coordinates: 50°54′01″N 0°36′49″E
- Grid reference: TQ838144
- Owner: Network Rail
- Manager: Southern
- Platforms: 1

Other information
- Station code: TOK
- Classification: DfT category F2

History
- Opened: 1 July 1907
- Original company: South Eastern Railway
- Pre-grouping: South Eastern & Chatham Railway
- Post-grouping: Southern Railway

Key dates
- 1 July 1907: Opened as Three Oaks Bridge Halt
- 1909: Renamed Three Oaks Halt
- ?: Renamed Three Oaks & Guestling Halt
- 5 May 1969: Renamed Three Oaks & Guestling
- 12 May 1980: Renamed Three Oaks

Passengers
- 2021/22: ▲8,952
- 2022/23: ▲12,196
- 2023/24: ▲14,938
- 2024/25: ▲15,482
- 2025/26: ▲20,434
Location
Notes
- Passenger statistics from the Office of Rail and Road

Three Oaks railway station serves the village of Three Oaks, East Sussex, England. It is on the Marshlink line with all services operated by Southern. It was originally known as Three Oaks & Guestling.

== History ==
The railway line between Ashford and Hastings was opened by the South Eastern Railway in 1851, but originally there were no stations between Winchelsea and Hastings. Ore opened in 1888, and with the introduction of steam railmotor services between Rye and Hastings, three halts were opened between Winchelsea and Ore on 1 July 1907: Snailham Crossing Halt; Guestling Halt; and Three Oaks Bridge Halt. The latter station has been renamed four times: in 1909 it became Three Oaks Halt; later on it became Three Oaks & Guestling Halt; on 5 May 1969 Three Oaks & Guestling; finally on 12 May 1980 the present name of Three Oaks was adopted.

== Description ==
The station has a single platform from which trains depart to Ashford International and Eastbourne via Hastings. The Marshlink line was singled on 1 October 1979 between Appledore and Ore, with the westbound platform now used by services in both directions with the eastbound platform remaining in situ, albeit in a decaying state.

The platform can only accommodate a single carriage, meaning that passengers wishing to disembark must travel in the front carriage of the train.

There is a ticket issuing facility accepting card payments available here and a customer help point with on-screen customer information.

== Services ==
The typical off-peak service at Three Oaks is one train per hour each way between Eastbourne (via Hastings) and Ashford International. All services are operated by Southern using Class 171 DMUs.

=== Service history ===
Until 2005, the station was served by hourly services each way between Ashford International and Hastings. However, in the 2005 timetable change, trains on the line were extended to run to/from Brighton (via Eastbourne and Lewes) and operated as express services; as a result, service frequency at Three Oaks (as well as neighbouring Doleham and Winchelsea) was greatly reduced, to just 3 trains per day each way. This led to the creation of a campaign the by Three Oaks and Winchelsea Action for Rail Transport (THWART) and the Marshlink Line Action Group (MLAG), which aimed to restore regular services from these stations.

This campaign was successful, and from December 2010 the weekday and Saturday service frequency at Three Oaks and Winchelsea was increased to 1 train every 2 hours each way (with services calling alternately at each station), plus a few additional stopping services during the peaks. The Sunday frequency has also been two-hourly each way since December 2015. In May 2018, the Brighton express services were replaced by stopping services to/from Eastbourne.

The May 2023 timetable change saw hourly services fully restored, with all trains now calling at both Three Oaks and Winchelsea seven days a week.

Preceding station	National Rail	Following station
Ore	Southern Marshlink line	Doleham or Winchelsea
