= List of places in Sussex =

List of places in Sussex may refer to:

- List of places in East Sussex
- List of places in West Sussex
