= Doleham railway station =

Railway station in East Sussex, England

Doleham
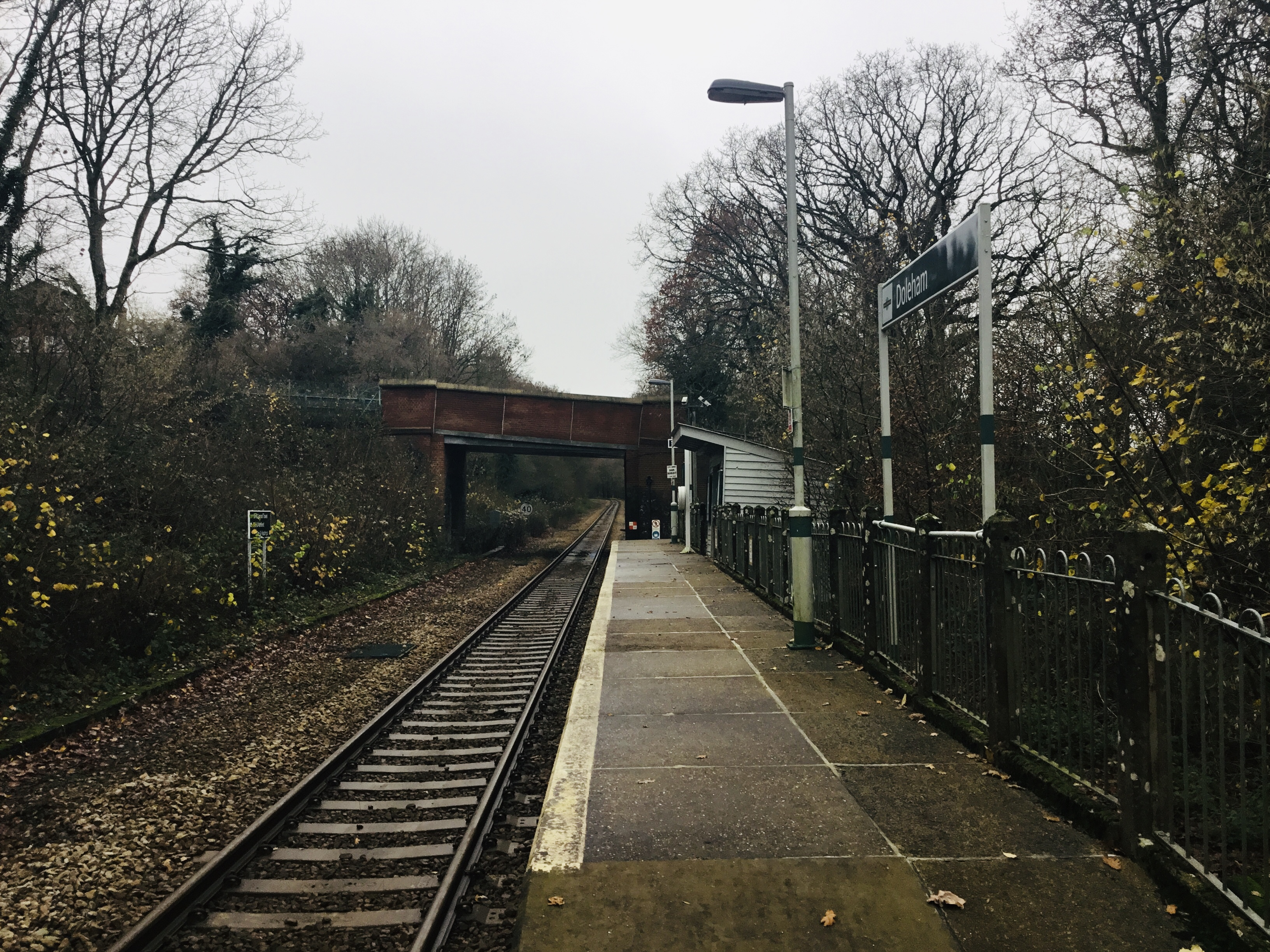
- The platform at Doleham station, looking south

General information
- Location: Doleham; England
- Coordinates: 50.919°N 0.611°E
- Grid reference: TQ835164
- Manager: Southern
- Platforms: 1

Other information
- Station code: DLH
- Classification: DfT category F2

History
- Original company: South Eastern Railway
- Pre-grouping: South Eastern and Chatham Railway
- Post-grouping: Southern Railway

Key dates
- 1 July 1907: Opened as Guestling Halt
- 1909: Renamed Doleham Halt
- 5 May 1969: Renamed Doleham

Passengers
- 2021/22: ▲848
- 2022/23: ▼550
- 2023/24: ▲1,038
- 2024/25: ▲1,706
- 2025/26: ▲2,066
Location
Notes
- Passenger statistics from the Office of Rail and Road

Doleham railway station is a small, single-platform wayside halt in Doleham, East Sussex, England. It is on the Marshlink line, and train services are provided by Southern. The station is very isolated and serves only a handful of houses in the immediate area. There was an approximate daily figure of 8 passengers a day pre-Covid. In the 12 month period 2024/25 over 1700 passengers used the station.

== History ==
The station opened as Guestling Halt on 1 July 1907 after the South Eastern and Chatham Railway had introduced a steam railcar service on the line in order to improve traffic. It was one of the few places along the line between Hastings and Winchelsea that could access the railway by a public road. The station was renamed Doleham Halt in 1909 as Guestling was more conveniently accessed from the previous station, Three Oaks.

By 1913, the station was being served by ten rail cars a day. This dropped to about seven per day in the inter-war period.

The "halt" suffix was dropped on 5 May 1969. The station had two platforms until 1979 when the line through the station was singled; as a result, all trains now use the former "up" (Ashford-bound) platform.

In 2011, a local newspaper observed that because of the inconvenient stops and lack of access, Doleham could be technically interpreted as the most crime-ridden station in Sussex as there was one reported crime for every 473 passengers. By comparison, the more likely candidate, Gatwick Airport, only recorded one crime per 43,873 passengers.

== Services ==
Owing to low patronage, the station is only served by a handful of trains each way, with no services at all during the off-peak period. It is the least used station in East Sussex and all of Sussex.

In the morning, there are three southbound trains to Eastbourne, and one northbound train to Ashford International. There is one train to Ashford International and one train to Eastbourne during the afternoon peak, and one train to Ashford International and one train to Hastings in the late evening. This gives a total of three daily services northbound and five services southbound on a weekday.

At weekends, the service pattern is reduced to just two trains per day in each direction: only the first and the last train on the line call at the station.

=== Service history ===
Until 2005 the station was served by hourly services each way between Ashford International and Hastings. However, in the 2005 timetable change, trains on the line were extended to run to/from Brighton (via Eastbourne and Lewes) and operated as express services; as a result, service frequency at Doleham (as well as neighbouring Three Oaks and Winchelsea) was greatly reduced, to just 3 trains per day each way.

This led to the creation of a campaign by the Three Oaks and Winchelsea Action for Rail Transport (THWART) and the Marshlink Line Action Group (MLAG), which aimed to restore regular services from these stations. In the end, only Winchelsea and Three Oaks have benefited from this campaign (with two-hourly services at those stations commencing in December 2010, and hourly services restored in May 2023); Doleham's limited service frequency has remained almost unchanged.

| Preceding station | National Rail | Following station |
|---|---|---|
| Three Oaks | Southern Marshlink Line Limited Service | Winchelsea |
| | Historical railways | |
| Three Oaks Line and station open | South Eastern and Chatham Railway Marshlink Line | Snailham Halt Line open, station closed |
