= Lullington Heath =

Nature reserve in East Sussex, England

Coordinates: 50.794°N 0.18°E

- Site of Special Scientific Interest
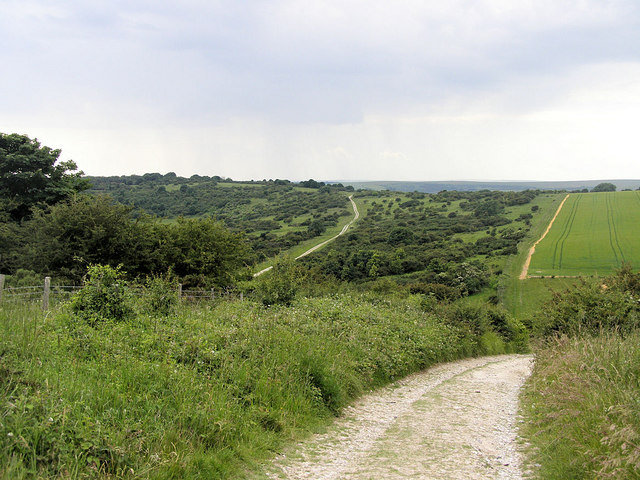
- Location of Lullington Heath.
- Area of search: East Sussex
- Grid reference: TQ 543 017
- Interest: Biological
- Area: 72.7 hectares (180 acres)
- Notification date: 1986
- Location map: Magic Map

Lullington Heath is a 72.7-hectare (180-acre) biological Site of Special Scientific Interest west of Eastbourne in East Sussex. It is a national nature reserve and a Nature Conservation Review site, Grade I.

This site has two nationally uncommon habitats, chalk heath and chalk grassland. Chalk heath formerly covered most of the site but scrub took over much of it after myxomatosis almost wiped out the rabbit population in the 1950s. The grassland is rich in flowering plants and the scrub and rough grassland provide valuable habitats for invertebrates and birds.

The village of Lullington and Lullington Church lie to the north-west of the heath, which is in the civil parish of Cuckmere Valley.
