= List of settlements in Sussex by population =

List of settlements in Sussex by population may refer to:

- List of settlements in East Sussex by population
- List of settlements in West Sussex by population
