= Seahaven =

Seahaven may refer to:

- Seahaven, Washington, U.S.
- Seahaven, East Sussex, UK
- Seahaven FM, a community radio station in Seahaven, East Sussex
- Seahaven, the fictional town in the 1998 film The Truman Show
- Seahaven (band), an alternative rock band from the United States
