= Barcombe =

Village and parish in East Sussex, England

Coordinates: 50.923°N 0.018°E

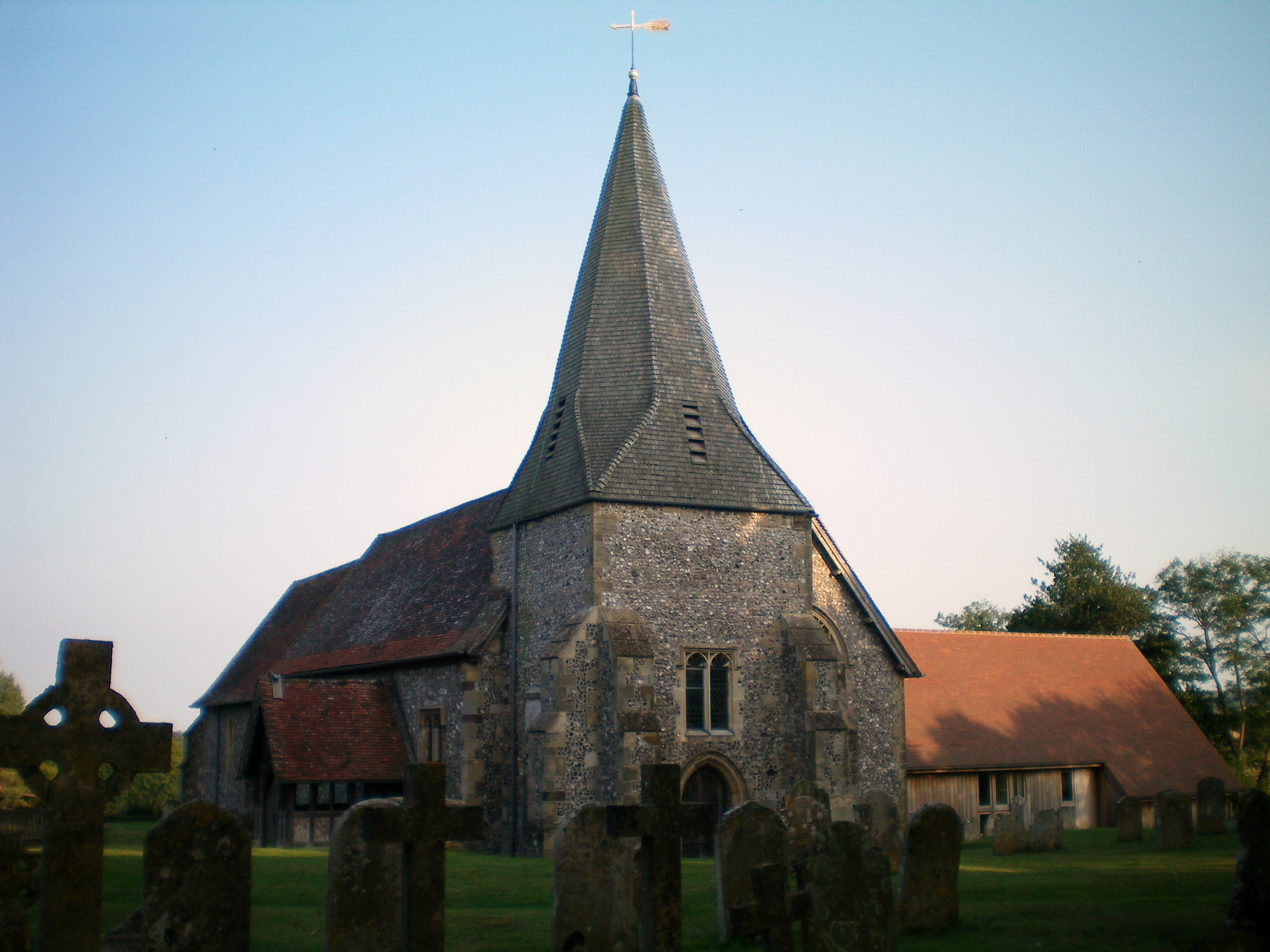
- St Mary’s Church, Barcombe

- Location within East Sussex
- Area: 17.8 km^{2} (6.9 sq mi)
- Population: 1,473 (Parish-2011)
  - Density: 211/sq mi (81/km^{2})
- OS grid reference: TQ417144
  - London: 41 miles (66 km) N
- District: Lewes
- Shire county: East Sussex
- Region: South East
- Country: England
- Sovereign state: United Kingdom
- Post town: LEWES
- Postcode district: BN8
- Dialling code: 01273
- Police: Sussex
- Fire: East Sussex
- Ambulance: South East Coast
- UK Parliament: East Grinstead and Uckfield
- Website: https://www.barcombe.net/

Barcombe is an East Sussex village and civil parish in the Lewes District of East Sussex. The parish has four settlements: old Barcombe (TQ 418 143), the oldest settlement in the parish with the parish church; Barcombe Cross (TQ 420 158), the more populous settlement and main hub with the amenities and services; the hamlet of Spithurst (TQ 426 174) in the northeast and Town Littleworth (TQ 410 180) in the northwest.

Barcombe was recorded in the Domesday Book of 1086 as "Berchamp". The origins of the placename 'Barcombe' may have derived from two sources: the Saxon 'Berecampe', meaning 'barley land' and the Latin loan word 'campus', a field.

Barcombe is particularly noted to Sussex residents and tourists for 'Barcombe Mills', a reference to an old water-mill complex on the River Ouse at the base of the hill/plateau on which Barcombe Cross sits. The mills burnt down before the Second World War, but Barcombe Mills is still a popular Sunday outing for townsfolk from Lewes and Brighton. The parish is home to a number of tributaries of the River Ouse, which serve as a nationally significant spawning ground and nursery for the Sussex sea trout (Salmo trutta).

== History ==
=== Roman settlements ===
There have recently been two important excavations at old Barcombe. From 1999 onwards they have been excavating a Roman villa and surrounding buildings south of the church (TQ 419 142). The villa lay near the crossroads of the Roman Greensand Way. It was found on top of an earlier Iron Age roundhouse. The Roman inhabitants are likely to have benefited from the iron industry in the Wealden forests to the north. The villa was abandoned around 300AD.

Even more recently the Culver Archaeological Project found a Roman defended settlement just across the Ouse at Bridge Farm, Upper Wellingham (TQ 431 144), corroborating the importance of the Roman presence here. Old Barcombe's landscape could be a continuation of the Roman settlements.

=== Domesday Survey ===
Barcombe (Bercham) was recorded in the Domesday Book of 1086 as comprising 26 households, including two smallholdings. There were ploughlands for eleven plough teams, and included in the listing were three mills and a church.

=== Disused railways ===
Two railway lines ran through the villages: the line between Lewes and Uckfield; and the line from East Grinstead, part of which is now the Bluebell Railway. There were stations on each of the two lines: Barcombe station on the East Grinstead line, and Barcombe Mills station on the Uckfield line, with a junction south of the latter before the line continued to Lewes. Barcombe closed on 28 May 1955, whilst Barcombe Mills closed on 4 May 1969. Part of the line is now a cycle track. Barcombe Cross only became the hub of the parish when the railway line opened; before such time it was just one of the dispersed hamlets. A few cottages survive from the pre-modern times including the 17th-century Mongers Farmhouse (TQ 420 155).

In summer 2021 National Highways (formerly Highways England) announced that they intended to infill the bridge over the old Lewes to Uckfield railway line that passes under Church Road. The bridge has been defined as "weak" for many years, with a 20 tonne weight limit for traffic. It is part of the Historical Railways Estate managed by National Highways on behalf of the Department for Transport, comprising 3,200 bridges, tunnels and viaducts, including 77 listed structures.

Infilling would entail pouring 1800 tonnes of concrete under the bridge to support it. The land under the bridge is in a conservation area, is used for walking and has many varieties of wildlife. Barcombe residents worked with the Historical Railways Estate group, to prevent the infill.

In Dec 2021 National Highways announced that they no longer intended to infill the bridge, but noted that they had an obligation to secure a weight limit of 24 tonnes for the bridge, so would be considering what action to take after devising a new method for assessing the structures it is responsible for.

== Old Barcombe ==
Notable areas around Barcombe

Barcombe, the oldest settlement in the parish. It hosts the St Mary's parish church (TQ 418 143) and there are a few old houses around it. The medieval church, with its fine shingled, broached spire, may incorporate some materials robbed from the Roman villa found nearby (though this is not visible in the restored church). The church was rebuilt in 1878–9. The agreement to restore the old church included a commitment to build a new church at Spithurst in the north of the parish. This was old St, Bartz.

=== Shelley's Folly ===
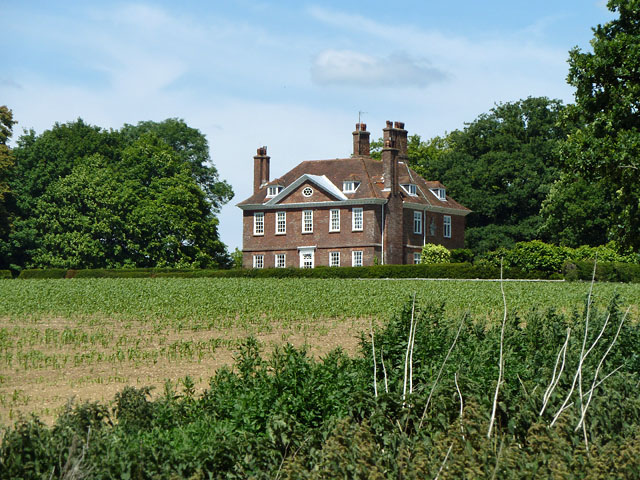
Shelley's Folly

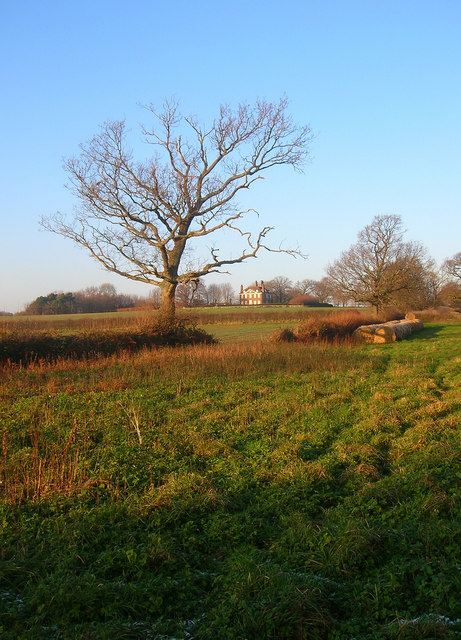
Shelley's Folly

Shelley's Folly was built by Theobald Shelley in 1686. The property passed through generations of the Shelley family until the early 19th century when the poet Percy Bysshe Shelley who was the next in line to inherit the property sold out to his younger brother in 1815, who himself sold it to Sir John Dodson, a well-known judge and politician, in the 1840s. The Dodson family retained ownership of the property for the next 150 years. Through much of this period, they let it with notable tenants including George Murray Levick, a surgeon on the ill-fated Terra Nova Antarctic expedition of Scott in 1912, and the Marchioness of Queensberry and family which included her grandson Lord Alfred Douglas, poet and former lover of Oscar Wilde. The Dodsons, now Lord Monk Brettons, moved back into the property in the late 1960s, refurbishing the property before selling up in 2004.

=== Camoiscourt Shaw ===
North of the old Barcombe village towards Barcombe Cross is Camoiscourt Shaw (TQ 419 153), a woodland gill along which the derelict Bluebell Line ran. A footpath leads from Church Road across cow pasture and into the gill.

=== Conyboro Park ===
Conyboro Park, Cooksbridge, is in the parish of Barcombe. It has some woods, and the south side had some old trees of impressive girth. The section of the North End Stream to the south has a bank side Bluebell wood, and more woodland the east (TQ 410 136).

== Barcombe Cross ==
The village has three main routes into the centre of the village and the buildings cluster around the crossroads. A 1724 map by Richard Budgen is the first time the place name Barcombe Cross is identified and the map has a pictorial depiction of the crossroads. Barcombe Cross expanded from 1839 onwards when the railway station opened and has since become the main village in the parish hosting the parish school, shops, amenities and services. Barcombe Cross is now just known as Barcombe in the local area and is signposted as such. It is only on maps is it shown in its full name.

=== Barcombe Oil Mill and pasture ===
Barcombe Oil Mill which was in operation until 1909. It was demolished in 1917 leaving a few discarded millstones and the old mill leat. It is South of Barcombe Cross and north of Camoiscourt Shaw. Up until around 2022 the demolished mill was a pasture remarkable for its botanical richness, (TQ 422 152) with a range of archaic meadow plants. The soil is very varied in this area which gave rise to the mix of grassland species, including plants which prefer acidic soils such as Tormentil, Heath Grass and Devil's Bit, through to those that prefer neutral grassland including Ox Eye Daisy and Pignut, to the alkaline loving Quaking Grass, Yellow-Oat Grass and Ladies Bedstraw. Since 2022 unfortunately, much of this has been lost to scrub and a few rabbit-resistant plants.

=== Bird's Hole Wood ===
To the west of Barcombe Cross is Bird's Hole Wood (TQ 406 153). It is Hazel coppice under Ash and has some fine oaks. It is a partially ancient woodland and partially descended from rough common. In spring the ground is half Bluebells and half Bramble.

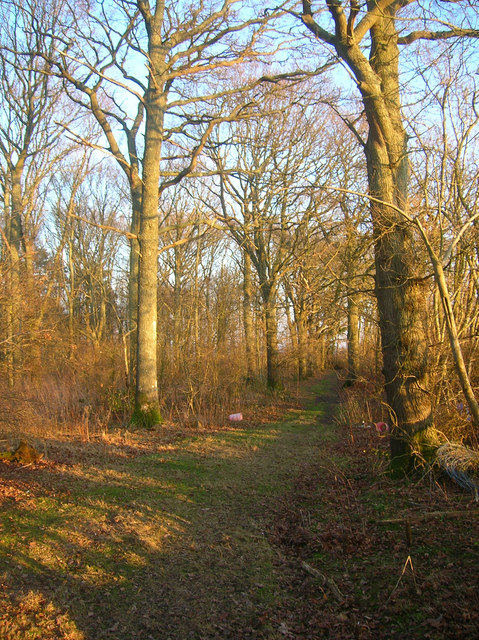
Blunts Wood

=== Blunt's Wood ===
Blunt's Wood (TQ 406 153) is on the very west of the parish and southwest of Bird's Hole Wood. It has Beech and coppice shrubs, but has suffered from much replanting of conifers. In the early spring months woodland floor is covered in Bluebells.

=== Barcombe Mills ===
Barcombe Mills is a conservation area and a popular spot for walking, kayaking and river swimming and an important area for its wildlife, natural environment and water storage. The Barcombe Reservoir is adjacent. The area includes a small hamlet and some farms, including Barcombe House, and a water treatment works.

== Spithurst ==
The hamlet of Spithurst is mainly on one lane, Spithurst Lane, running north of Barcombe Cross. The soil is Wealden Clay and three tiny-but-colourful old meadows still survive around Spithurst, including the old 'St Bartz' churchyard.

In 1296 the hamlet was known as 'Splytherst' and this may have been after Alexander and Richard Splyherst. The name Spithurst could also be derived from the term 'split-wood' because the hamlet did indeed split two giant 'hursts': on the west side, Knowlands, Oldpark, The Butletts, Spithurst Wood and Slutgarden Woods and on the east side, Burtenshaw's, Agmond's and Down Coppice Woods.

Between Spithurst and Newick is the 2,000 acre Sutton Hall Estate.

=== Old 'St Bartz' ===
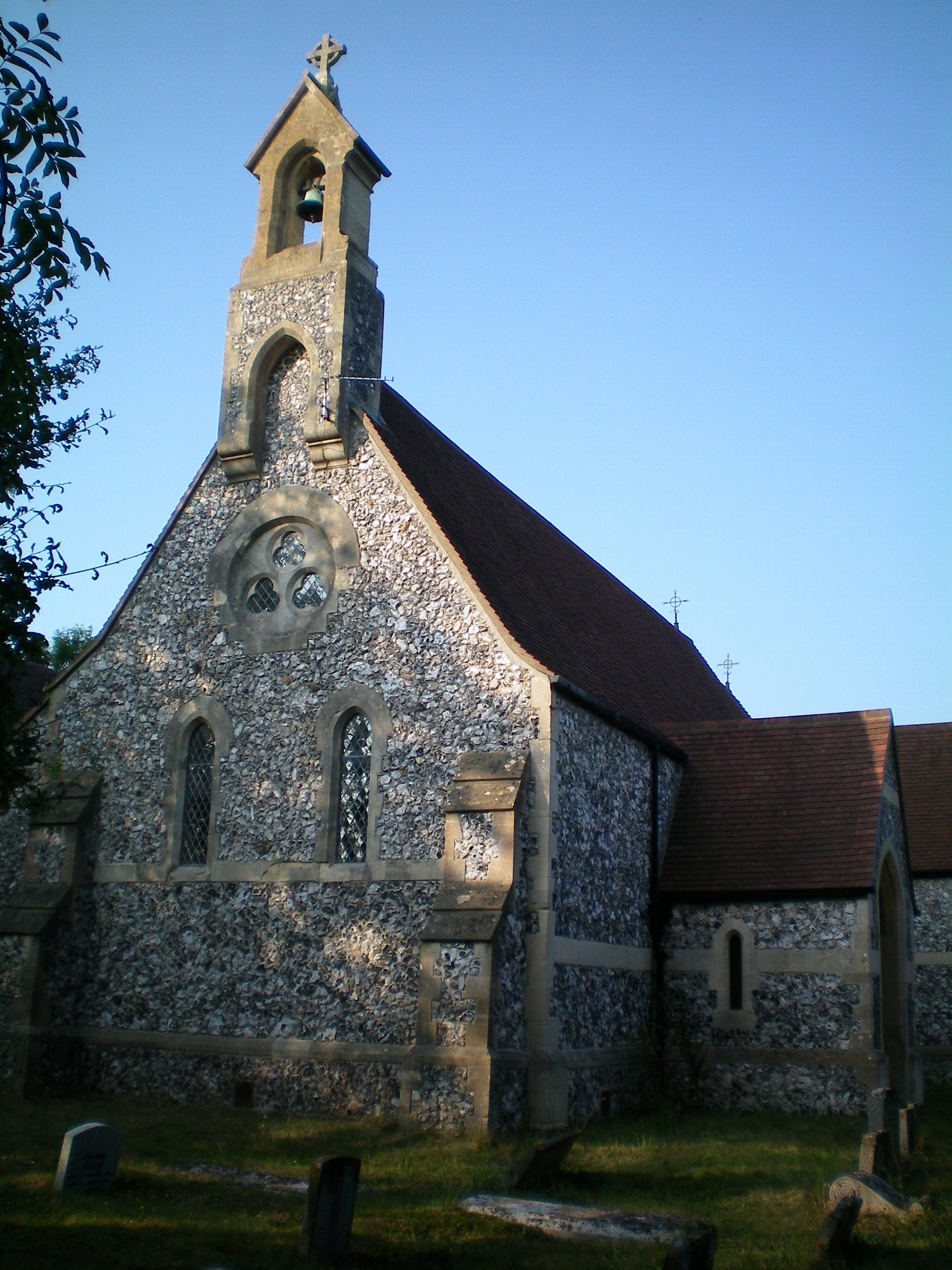
Old St Bartz Church, Spithurst

St Bartholomew's Church was built in 1879-80 of flint with masonry. The church was part of a unique experiment in inter-church co-operation when the Anglican minister allowed the local Russian Orthodox clergy to use it on the Sundays that he was not. The small Orthodox congregation was made up of Russian exiles and converts and the church became famous for their elaborate ritual.

In 1969 plans were drawn to close and demolish the building until a year later the Queen signed an order withdrawing the scheme. The church finally did close in 1994 and it became a diocesan youth centre called St Bartz. A large extension has been added on the north side. St Bartz youth centre closed during the pandemic and the building is now (2022) standing empty.

Despite relatively small congregations, the churchyard is quite full and contains a large but anonymous family mausoleum. The relaxed management of the churchyard has given it the character of a woodland glade and a haven for wild flowers. Species recorded at St Bartz in 2017 included "Anemones, Bluebells and Goldenrod mixed in with Devils Bit and Betony, Ling Heather, Pepper Saxifrage, Bitter Vetch and Tormentil, lots of Birds Foot Trefoil, Mouse Ear Hawkweed and Red Clover". It is also famous for its display of Green-Winged orchids. More recently the churchyard has been split in two and damaged by 'improvement' in one part, and neglect in the other. Since 2024 much of this flora has been lost.

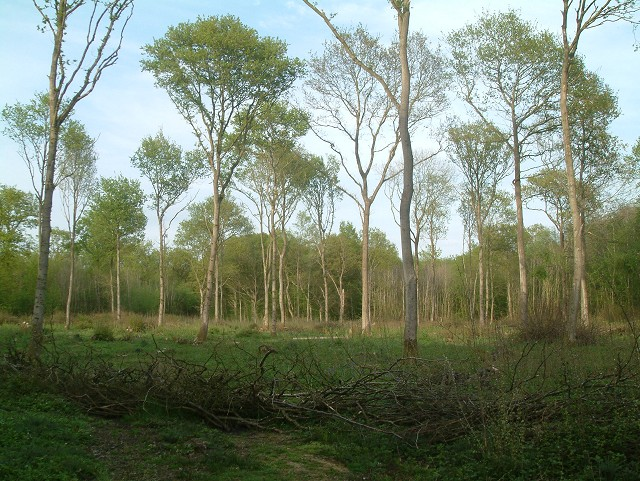
Knowlands Wood

=== Knowlands Farm and wood ===
Knowlands Farm and Wood, (TQ 419 170) is a special place where the owner makes visitors feel welcome; "No spending is expected at any farm shop, or to view the Bluebells. No gamekeepers challenge you". There are Swan Mussels in the farm pond and Kingfishers use it.

The woodland is an Oak-Hornbeam with Small Leaved Lime, Wild Service tree, Alder Buckthorn and Aspen and active coppice management. Anemones and Bluebell are co-dominant and there are Grass Snake, Adders, Stag Beetles, Purple Hairsteak and White Admiral butterfly, and the Purple Emperor is being restored. The rides are wide and sunny and in spring Willow and Garden Warblers, Blackcap, Chiffchaff and even Nightingales can be heard in the coppice regrowth.

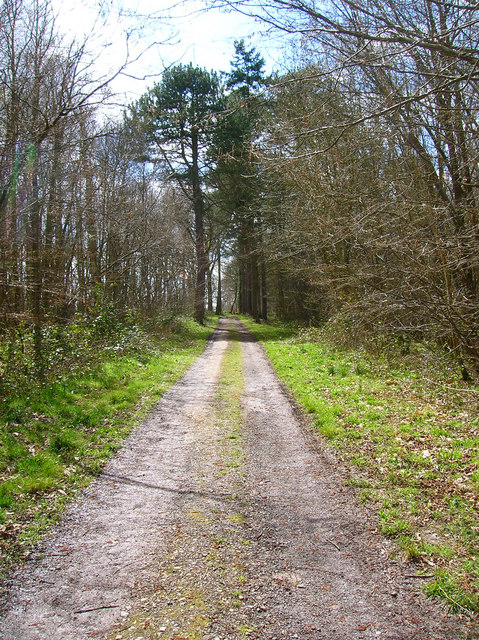
Dallas Lane, Agmond's Wood

=== Down Coppice, Agmond's Wood and Burtenshaw's Wood ===
East of Spithurst Lane from St Bartz is a big wood named in three parts: Down Coppice, Agmond's Wood and Burtenshaw's Wood (TQ 43 17). They are attractive woods with flowery rides, sunny glades, clay banks and big ponds. The woods are varied with much old Hornbeam and some Hazel coppice (still cut), areas of Larch and scented pine, maturing Oak and Sweet Chestnut coppice (rare on the Wealden Clay). In spring there are Primroses, Anemones and Bugle and in summer Betony and Tormentil.

=== Gipp's Wood ===
Gipp's Wood (TQ 430 188) is to the north of Beak Farm. It is coniferised to the north and the wood is used for Christmas trees, but is still "open, pine-scented and airy, with old coppice on the lower ground".

== Town Littleworth ==
Town Littleworth, Cooksbridge, is a small hamlet to the north west of the parish that spans Town Littleworth Road. It hosts the Secret Campsite that celebrates the local wildlife and hosts the Sussex Wildlife festival.

=== Oldpark Wood ===
Oldpark Wood, (TQ 418 179) is to the east of Town Littleworth and an Oak-Hornbeam coppice. Wood Anemone is overwhelmingly dominant in April. Knowlands and Oldpark were probably joined before a large part of the wood to the south was cleared to make pastures for Church Farm around two hundred years ago, and to the north nearly a hundred acres was cleared about fifty years ago, when Spithurst Wood (TQ 425 175) was separated from Oldpark Wood, too.

== Parish streams ==
There are three streams in the parish: the Bevern Stream, the North End Stream and the Longford Stream. They all flow east to the River Ouse and all demarcate the boundary of the parish in one way or other. Before the early 19th century, these streams created different islands absolutely cut off from each other in wet winters. The streams are chalk-fed and known for their sea trout populations, which grow to large sizes and return year after year. Sadly these populations are on the brink of collapse due to mismanagement of these waterways, largely by Southern Water and sometimes farmers who have allowed their effluent to overflow into them. Wild salmon, which once bred in these waters, are now very rare.

The Bevern Stream runs from the South Downs and there are many Downland flints brought by ice age torrents. It meanders from Clappers Bridge, (TQ 422 161), eastwards past Red Bridge and Beam Bridge, and, under the lost railway line, to the Ouse. It is particularly attractive to the west of Clappers Bridge, where there are water crowfoot, marsh frogs and minnows and bullheads swimming between the reeds. The big pond at Red Bridge, (TQ 426 159) on Camoys Court Farm, was enlarged for crop irrigation circa 1980.

Like the Bevern Stream, the North End Stream runs to the River Ouse from the South Downs and it also holds many Downland flints brought. The stream divides the Hamsey and Barcombe parishes and passes to the south of Old Barcombe. There is only one small stretch of public bank path along its entire length. There is a bankside Bluebell wood at Conyboro Park.

Both the Bevern and the North End Stream serve as a nationally significant spawning grounds and nurseries for the Sussex sea trout (Salmo trutta), providing critical cold-water habitat necessary for early lifecycle stages before the fish migrate to the English Channel. Together, these watercourses form vital ecological corridors within the Ouse basin, supporting local biodiversity and river health.

The Longford Stream through the north of the parish and to the west it demarcates the boundary between Barcombe parish and Newick parish. Much if its banks are made from Ardingly Sandstone (deep mud) and are botanically rich and support many butterflies and beetles. In areas it creates marshy brooks such as Beak's Marsh (TQ 439 177) where archaic fen and damp meadow vegetation partly remains. There is a large area of Greater Pond Sedge where roe deer hide. The Roman road to London passed across the eastern part of the marsh.

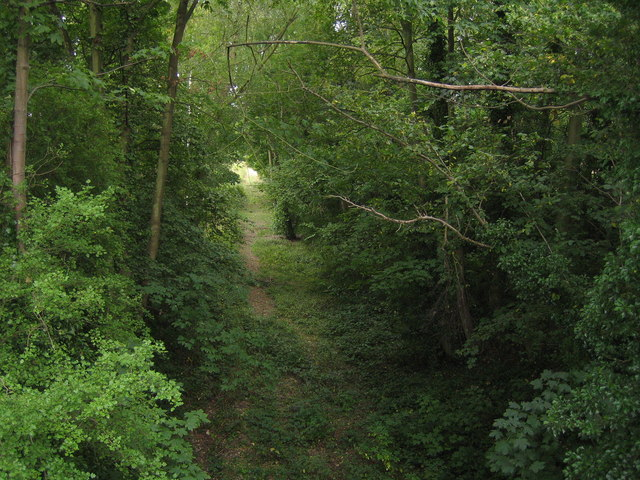
Barcombe, dismantled railway line

== Bluebell Line walk ==
The disused Bluebell Line still has the wildflowers of ancient open places and is popular with walkers and nature enthusiasts. It passes through Camoiscourt Shaw (TQ 419 153), a woodland gill, north of the old Barcombe village towards Barcombe Cross. Species recorded there include (2018) Wild Carrot, Corn Mint, Pepper Saxifrage, Agrimony, vetches, thistles and Teazel, Upright Hedge Parsley and Meadow-sweet.

To the north of the Bevern Stream the embankment herbage is more open and grassier. Species found there have included several orchids, Zigzag Clover, Milkwort, String Sedge, Guelder Rose, Spiny Restharrow, Dodder (a rare parasitic herb) and Dyers Greenweed. It is a rich place for butterflies, moths and insects. In Knowlands Wood the ground gets damper and it is possible to find Ragged Robin, Marsh Bedstraw and False Fox Sedge.

== Bonfire ==
Barcombe Bonfire is held annually, two weeks after the Lewes celebration on which it is modelled. The society is largely family-orientated and everyone helps out with torch dipping and bonfire building. There is a firework display and several processions.

== Governance ==
Barcombe is part of the electoral ward Barcombe and Hamsey. The population of this ward at the 2011 census was 2,105, of which 741 lived in the only identified Built-up Area, Barcombe (Cross). The latter had 320 homes, none of which communal establishments.

The UK Parliament constituency for Barcombe is Lewes. The Liberal Democrat Norman Baker served as the constituency MP from 1997 until 2015, when Conservative Maria Caulfield was elected. As of July 2024 Liberal Democrat James MacCleary is the MP.

Prior to Brexit in 2020, Barcombe was part of the South East England constituency in the European Parliament.

== Transport ==
There are many bridleways and footpaths in and around the villages, linking to Lewes, Isfield, Newick and many other places. The Sussex Ouse Valley Way runs through Barcombe Mills to the south.

The nearest railway station is now Cooksbridge, about 2 1/2 miles away.

A bus service is provided to the bus stop at the north of Barcombe Cross and outside the junction with the old road at Barcombe Mills. Services are provided by Compass Travel. The buses connect with the trains at Cooksbridge. There are no buses on Sundays to Barcombe Cross and no buses at all on weekends to Barcombe Mills.

The A26 between Lewes and Uckfield runs southeast of the villages. It can be accessed 2 miles (3.2 km) from the centre of the village via Barcombe Mills Road. The A275 runs north of the villages. This links Lewes and Haywards Heath.

== Notable residents ==
- Bernard Holden, veteran of the Burma campaign, president of the Bluebell Railway and father of standard gauge railway preservation was born in Barcombe Station in 1908.
- Kim Sears (also Murray), wife of tennis star Andy Murray, was born in the village.
- Steve Coogan, known for his comedic character Alan Partridge also lives on the outskirts of the village.

Natasha Kaplinsky Natasha Kaplinsky. She grew up in Barcombe Mills, returned many years later during her high profile TV years.Natasha Kaplinsky
