= Winchelsea railway station =

Railway station in East Sussex, England

Winchelsea
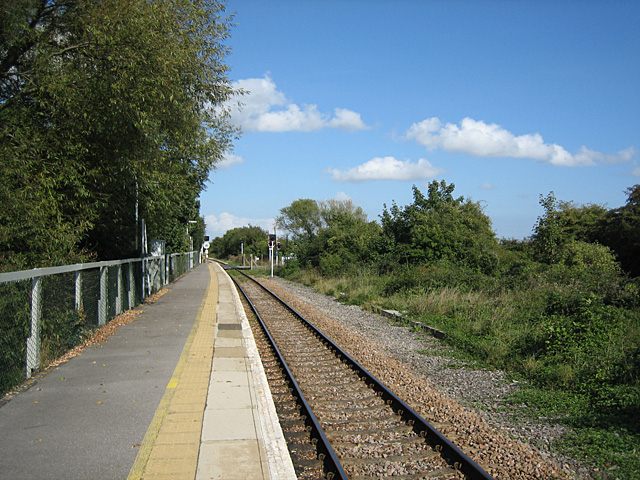

General information
- Location: Winchelsea, Rother District, England
- Coordinates: 50.93374°N 0.70222°E
- Grid reference: TQ899183
- Manager: Southern
- Platforms: 1

Other information
- Station code: WSE
- Classification: DfT category F2

History
- Opened: 13 February 1851

Passengers
- 2021/22: ▲9,322
- 2022/23: ▲12,004
- 2023/24: ▲14,196
- 2024/25: ▲19,260
- 2025/26: ▲22,980
Location
Notes
- Passenger statistics from the Office of Rail and Road

Winchelsea railway station serves the town of Winchelsea, in East Sussex, England. It lies 0.62 miles (1 km) from the town and is actually in the neighbouring parish of Udimore. The station is on the Marshlink line, 9.3 miles (15 km) north-east of Hastings; services are provided by Southern. The station originally had two platforms but, in 1979, the line was singled and only the up platform is now in use. The former down platform and station building are now converted to a private house.

== History ==
The station was opened by the South Eastern Railway (SER) on 13 February 1851 as one of the first stations on the line from Ashford to Hastings, along with Ham Street, Appledore and Rye. The station, like several others on the line, was built with staggered platforms in the belief that it would be safer for passengers to cross the railway behind a departing train. The station building was designed by the company architect William Tress.

Traffic was very sparse and the station closed on 1 September, in part because it was impossible to access the town without crossing private land. The Mayor of Winchelsea campaigned for reopening and negotiating access with the respective landowner, and the SER agreed to open the station on 4 December. A resignalling programme took place in the early 1890s.

The station gradually reduced its facilities. In 1961, the station building was sold off, and has since been in private hands. By 1969, the signal box and goods siding had been removed, and by the early 1970s the shelter canopy was removed and the post of crossing keeper was discontinued. On 1 October 1979, the line was reduced to a single track to reduce operational costs. The down platform (to Hastings) was removed; since then all trains have stopped at the one remaining platform. A 20 miles per hour (32 km/h) speed limit was imposed on the line approaching Winchelsea. The wooden shelter on the remaining (up) platform was replaced by a conventional modern shelter in 1984.

=== Service history ===
Until 2005, the station was served by hourly services each way between Ashford International and Hastings. However, in the 2005 timetable change, trains on the line were extended to run to/from Brighton, via Eastbourne and Lewes, and operated as express services; as a result, service frequency at Winchelsea (as well as neighbouring Doleham and Three Oaks) was greatly reduced, to just three trains per day each way. This led to the creation of a campaign by the Three Oaks and Winchelsea Action for Rail Transport (THWART) and the Marshlink Line Action Group (MLAG), which aimed to restore regular services from these stations.

This campaign was successful and, from December 2010, the weekday and Saturday service frequency at Winchelsea and Three Oaks was increased to 1 train every 2 hours each way (with services calling alternately at each station), plus a few additional stopping services during the peaks. The Sunday frequency has also been two-hourly each way since December 2015.

In May 2018, the Brighton express services were replaced by stopping services to/from Eastbourne.

The May 2023 timetable change saw hourly services fully restored, with all trains now calling daily at both Winchelsea and Three Oaks.

== Location ==
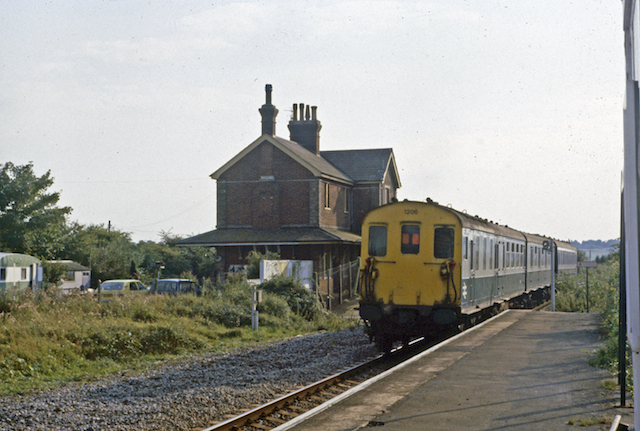
Winchelsea station, August 1982

The station is in an isolated location; it is not a convenient way of getting to or from Winchelsea, especially outside daylight hours. The route from the station to the town involves walking down an unlit and winding country lane, then walking along the A259 trunk road before climbing a steep hill to reach the town. The journey takes about 20 minutes on foot. However, local people may book a free lift to and from the station via a voluntary scheme run through Winchelsea Farm Kitchen.

As an alternative to trains, Stagecoach operates bus route 100 between Hastings and Rye, which stops in the town.

== Facilities ==
The buildings have been sold into private ownership and so this station is unstaffed.

There is step-free access to the platforms and a ticket machine is provided. There are no parking facilities, although there is bicycle storage.

== Services ==
All services are operated by Southern using Class 171 diesel multiple units. The typical off-peak service at Winchelsea is one train per hour each way between Eastbourne, Hastings and Ashford International.

Preceding station	National Rail	Following station
Doleham or Three Oaks	Southern Marshlink Line	Rye
	Historical railways	
Snailham Halt Line open, station closed	South Eastern and Chatham Railway Marshlink Line	Rye Line and station open
