= Snailham Halt railway station =

Disused railway station in East Sussex, England

Snailham Halt
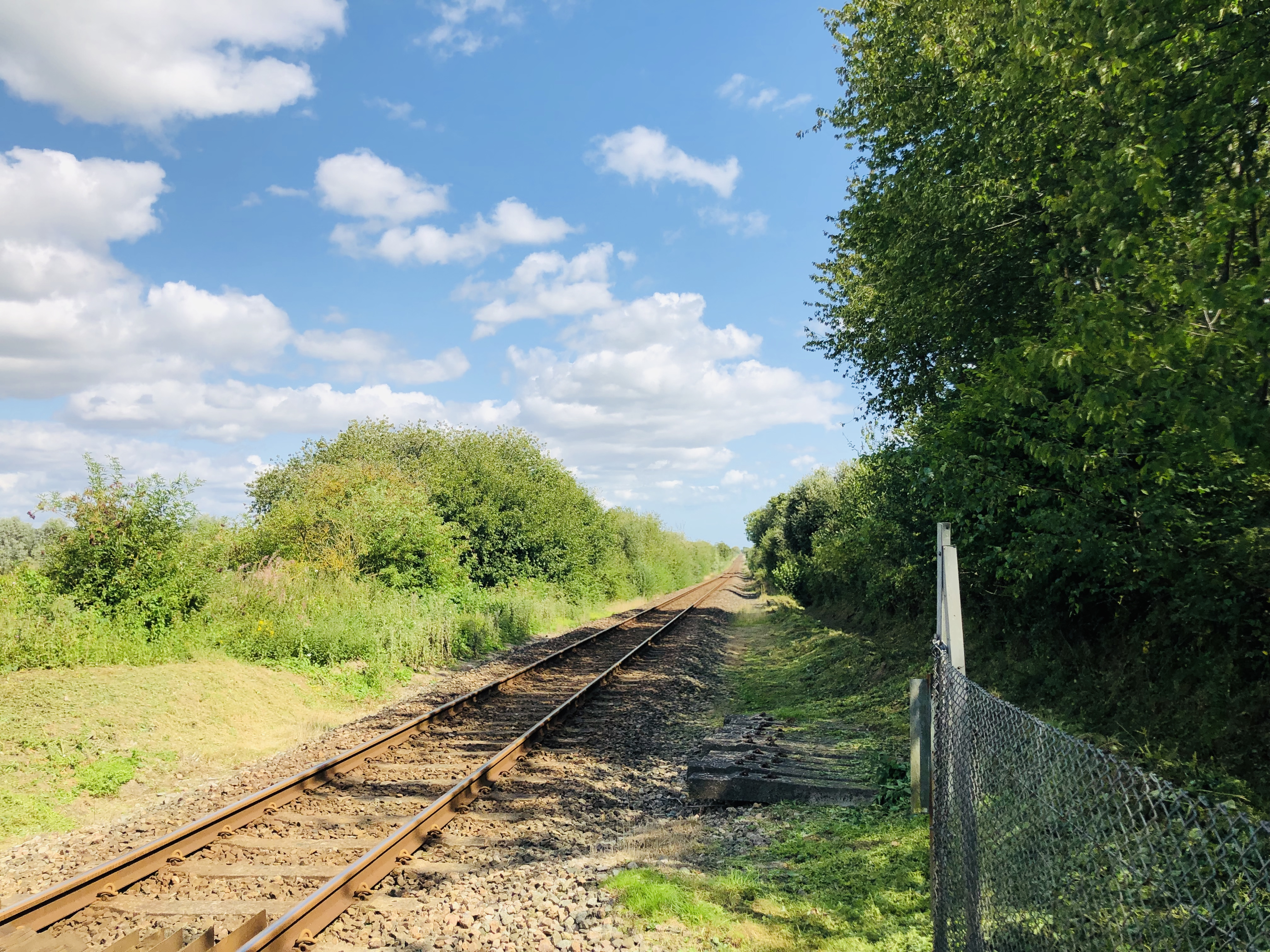
- Site of the old station

General information
- Location: Upper Snailham, Rother; England
- Coordinates: 50.9266°N 0.6432°E
- Grid reference: TQ858174
- Platforms: 2

Other information
- Status: Disused

History
- Original company: South Eastern Railway
- Pre-grouping: South Eastern and Chatham Railway
- Post-grouping: Southern Railway

Key dates
- 1 July 1907: Opened as Snailham Crossing Halt
- 1909: Renamed Snailham Halt
- 2 February 1959: Closed
Location

Snailham Halt railway station was on the South Eastern Railway's route between Ashford and Hastings, nowadays known as the Marshlink Line. It opened in 1907 and closed in 1959.

== History ==
The railway line between Ashford and Hastings was opened by the South Eastern Railway in 1851. The 1851 Census shows no activity, but the 1851 Census shows a "Railway Crossing" with the associated cottage shown occupied by a Platelayer in each subsequent Census. The 1911 Census shows that the crossing cottage was occupied by James Sargent and that his wife Charlotte is the Crossing Keeper.

There were no stations between Winchelsea and Hastings until Ore opened in 1888. However, at the turn of the 19th century, the South Eastern and Chatham Railway (SECR) introduced a scheme to develop traffic on lightly used branch lines by providing basic halts served by railmotor services. A sufficiently successful introduction of Kitson railmotors on the Hundred of Hoo Railway in 1906 to serve six new halts between Gravesend and Port Victoria persuaded the SECR to attempt the same scheme between Rye and Hastings, three halts at a cost of £295 each were opened between Winchelsea and Ore on 1 July 1907: Snailham Crossing Halt; Guestling Halt; and Three Oaks Bridge Halt.

Snailham Crossing Halt had two platforms; its name was shortened to Snailham Halt in 1909. It was situated in a remote location nearly 1/2-mile from the nearest dwelling and accessed via an unsurfaced country lane. The railmotor services were not a great success as passengers disliked the units which also lacked operational flexibility.

Snailham Halt was closed on 2 February 1959, and is the only station between Ashford and Hastings to have been closed.

Preceding station	Historical railways	Following station
Doleham; Line and station open	South Eastern and Chatham Railway; Ashford to Hastings Line	Winchelsea; Line and station open
