= Lullington, East Sussex =

Hamlet in East Sussex, England

Coordinates: 50.80290°N 0.16282°E

Lullington
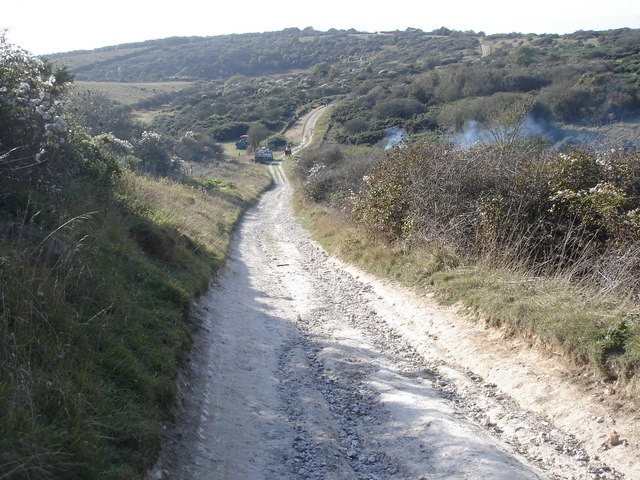
- Lullington Heath

- Location within East Sussex
- OS grid reference: TQ525026
- District: Wealden
- Shire county: East Sussex
- Region: South East
- Country: England
- Sovereign state: United Kingdom
- Post town: POLEGATE
- Postcode district: BN26
- Dialling code: 01323
- Police: Sussex
- Fire: East Sussex
- Ambulance: South East Coast

Lullington is a village and former civil parish, now in the parish of Cuckmere Valley, in the Wealden district, in the county of East Sussex, England. Historically in Sussex, it lies 9⅓ miles southeast of Lewes, on a shoulder of the South Downs at the point where the River Cuckmere cuts through the downs. It faces Alfriston on the opposite bank of the river. In 1961 the parish had a population of 35. On 1 April 1990 the parish was abolished and merged with Litlington and Westdean to form Cuckmere Valley.

Lullington Church, sometimes wrongly claimed to be the smallest church in England, is in the village.

Lullington Heath, a Site of Special Scientific Interest, lies to the south-east of the village.
