= Seaford to Beachy Head =

Geological site in Sussex

Coordinates: 50.758°N 0.183°E

- Site of Special Scientific Interest
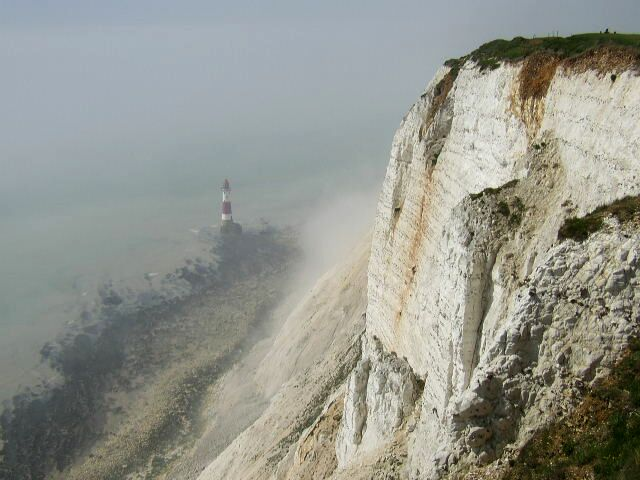
- Location of Seaford to Beachy Head.
- Area of search: East Sussex
- Grid reference: TV 541 976
- Interest: Biological; Geological
- Area: 1,108.7 hectares (2,740 acres)
- Notification date: 1999
- Location map: Magic Map

Seaford to Beachy Head is a 1,108.7-hectare (2,740-acre) biological and geological Site of Special Scientific Interest which stretches from Seaford to Eastbourne in East Sussex. It has several Geological Conservation Review sites. Part of it is a Nature Conservation Review site, Grade I. An area of 150 hectares (370 acres) is a Local Nature Reserve managed by the Sussex Wildlife Trust.

This site is of national importance for both its biological and geological features. Its habitats include chalk grassland, maritime grassland, chalk heath, foreshore, chalk cliffs, river meanders, and greensand reef. It has nationally rare plants, invertebrates, and birds. The site also exposes extensive chalk sections dating to the Late Cretaceous epoch around 80 million years ago.
