= Barcombe Mills =

Hamlet in East Sussex, England

Coordinates: 50.92°N 0.03°E

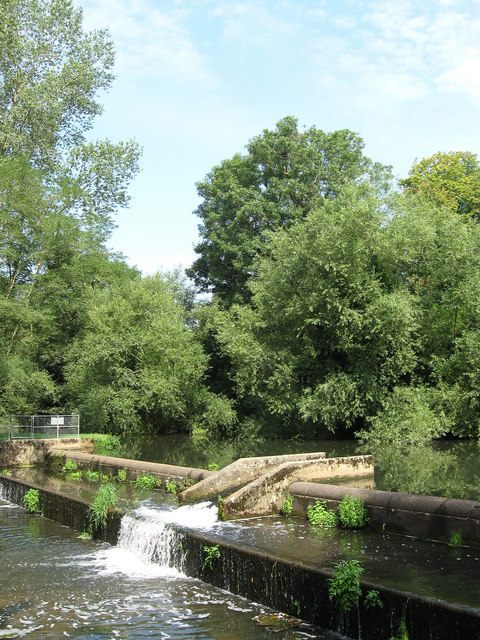
- Weir at Barcombe Mills

- Location within East Sussex
- OS grid reference: TQ432149
  - London: 40 miles (64 km) N
- Civil parish: Barcombe
- District: Lewes
- Shire county: East Sussex
- Region: South East
- Country: England
- Sovereign state: United Kingdom
- Post town: LEWES
- Postcode district: BN8
- Dialling code: 01273
- Police: Sussex
- Fire: East Sussex
- Ambulance: South East Coast
- UK Parliament: East Grinstead and Uckfield

Barcombe Mills is a small settlement and an area of countryside including a local nature reserve near the village of Barcombe Cross in East Sussex, England. It is located in the civil parish of Barcombe in the Lewes District. It is an important area for its wildlife, natural environment and water storage. The River Ouse and Andrew's Stream, one of its tributaries and popular for fishing, flow through the area and Barcombe Reservoir is adjacent. The area includes a small hamlet and some farms, including Barcombe House, and a water treatment works.

There were mills in the parish of Barcombe as far back as the 11th century. Thomas and Denise Erith are recorded as holding a corn mill at the beginning of the 16th century. Although the original mills were destroyed by fire in 1939, several pillboxes from the Second World War, a beautiful large brick bridge and many weirs remain.

The old road through the Mills features a former toll bridge which still displays its tolls in pre-decimalisation currency and a plaque mentioning that it was featured in the Domesday Book commissioned by William I.

The local pub is the Anchor Inn, where canoes can be hired for trips down the Ouse. This public house, however, is situated about a kilometre to the north of the main hamlet and cannot be accessed directly by road from Barcombe Mills. It can be accessed along the disused trackbed of the railway or by walking over footpaths. It can also be reached by car by driving into the village of Barcombe Cross and turning right; it is then signposted down the dead-end Anchor Lane. The pub's address is in Barcombe Mills but it is generally considered as an offshoot of Barcombe Cross or Spithurst.

The disused Barcombe Mills railway station served the hamlet until 1969.

Now just a collection of houses and a water treatment works, the area once had a thriving community. A pub called the Anglers' Rest (formerly known as the Railway Inn) closed in the 1990s. This was situated next to the former railway station. A restaurant was also present in the former railway station and this closed soon after the pub. Many more houses were also present at one time when the oil mills and the button factory still existed on the banks of the Ouse. The tributaries, weirs and millstreams cut to feed this are still obvious today – this is why the river takes such a bizarre course at Barcombe Mills. The hamlet is signposted from the village of Barcombe Cross but from nowhere else. In early 2018 two village signs were erected along Barcombe Mills Road, one at either side of the hamlet.

Since it has lost many of its services it has reduced to a quiet backwater consisting of houses and farms.

== Flooding ==
Barcombe Mills is at the River Ouse's tidal limit and is also on its flood plain. The fields around Barcombe Mills sometimes flood in winter, occasionally closing the road which bypasses the hamlet. A few of the hamlet's lower-lying houses were damaged by water when the Ouse in Lewes flooded in October 2000, described as a "once in a hundred years" event. The area is known to have been subject to flooding since Roman times.

== Tourism ==
The area is extremely popular with visitors in the summer who come to enjoy the beautiful riverside scenery on foot or by bicycle. There are numerous footpaths and a permissive bridleway along the disused trackbed of the railway to Anchor Lane. Many people enjoy walking, picnicking and swimming in the river in the summer months. Self-catering accommodation is available in the converted down waiting room of the former railway station.

== Fishing ==
The River Ouse is extremely popular with anglers for its carp, pike, trout and other species of popular fish. There are long stretches of river interspersed with many pools which make for high quality fishing. The Ouse Angling Preservation Society and Isfield Angling Club hold rights to the river with Isfield leasing out their stretch to the Lewes Angling Club also.

The river is also home to trout and migratory sea trout are seeing an increase. Andrew's Stream and the pool underneath the automatic sluice gates are popular with trout fisherman. Pike are also prevalent along with high quality carp and other species such as roach, rudd and foreign pumpkinseed and grass carp.

The vast Barcombe Reservoir used by South East Water's water treatment works to extract water for drinking is also popular with fly fishermen fishing for trout. The fact that the water is extracted for drinking shows the clean quality of the Ouse's waters.

== Local wildlife ==
Local bird and mammal species include: moorhen, mallard, mute swan, greylag goose, rabbit, barnacle goose, Canada goose, robin, blue tit, herring gull, sheep, cattle and grey wagtail. Most of the geese nest in the fenced off reservoir area. Rare freshwater mussels are also to be found in the quieter drains and streams that are in confluence with the Ouse.

== Transport ==
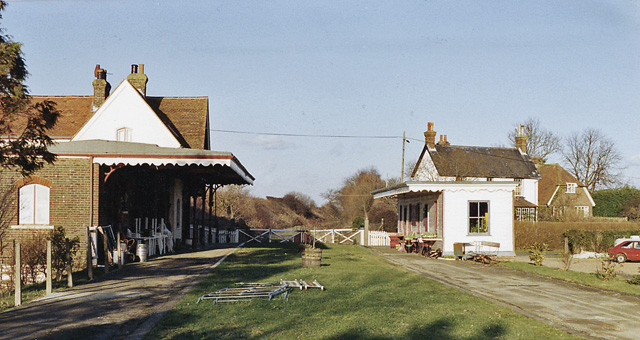
Barcombe Mills Station (remains)

The hamlet features the disused Barcombe Mills railway station which was on the former Lewes-Uckfield line. There is strong support for the re-opening of the line by the Wealden Line Campaign. The campaign has featured much prominence at national level, however a study by Network Rail considered the reopening technically but not economically feasible. However the group and local politicians are still campaigning.

The nearest open station is at Lewes. The nearest port is Newhaven, East Sussex and the nearest airport is at Shoreham. This airport sees mainly private planes and a few light flights to France and the Channel Islands. The nearest major airport is London's Gatwick Airport near Crawley.

The settlement lies along Barcombe Mills Road which leads north into the village of Barcombe Cross, giving access to the A275 and north to Newick and south to the A26.

The hamlet sees three buses a day into Lewes (one in the morning, two in the afternoon) and three return journeys in the afternoon and the evening on the 125 service operated by Compass Travel. The 125 only operates to Barcombe Mills on weekdays only.
