= Litlington, East Sussex =

Village in East Sussex, England

Litlington
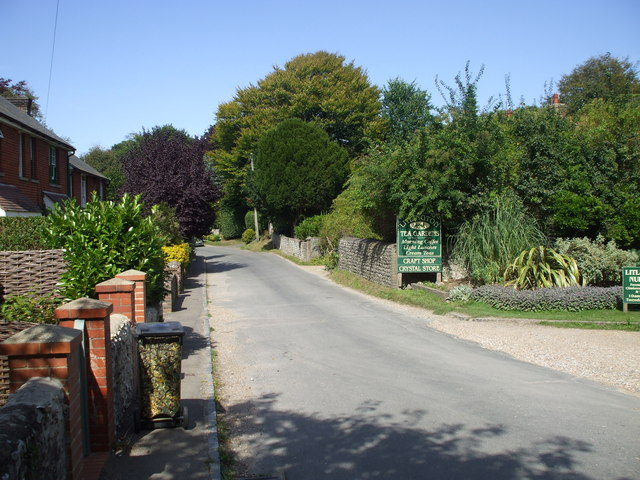
- Main street through Litlington and entrance to the Tea Gardens

- Location within East Sussex
- Civil parish: Cuckmere Valley
- District: Wealden
- Shire county: East Sussex
- Region: South East
- Country: England
- Sovereign state: United Kingdom
- Post town: POLEGATE
- Postcode district: BN26
- Dialling code: 01323
- Police: Sussex
- Fire: East Sussex
- Ambulance: South East Coast

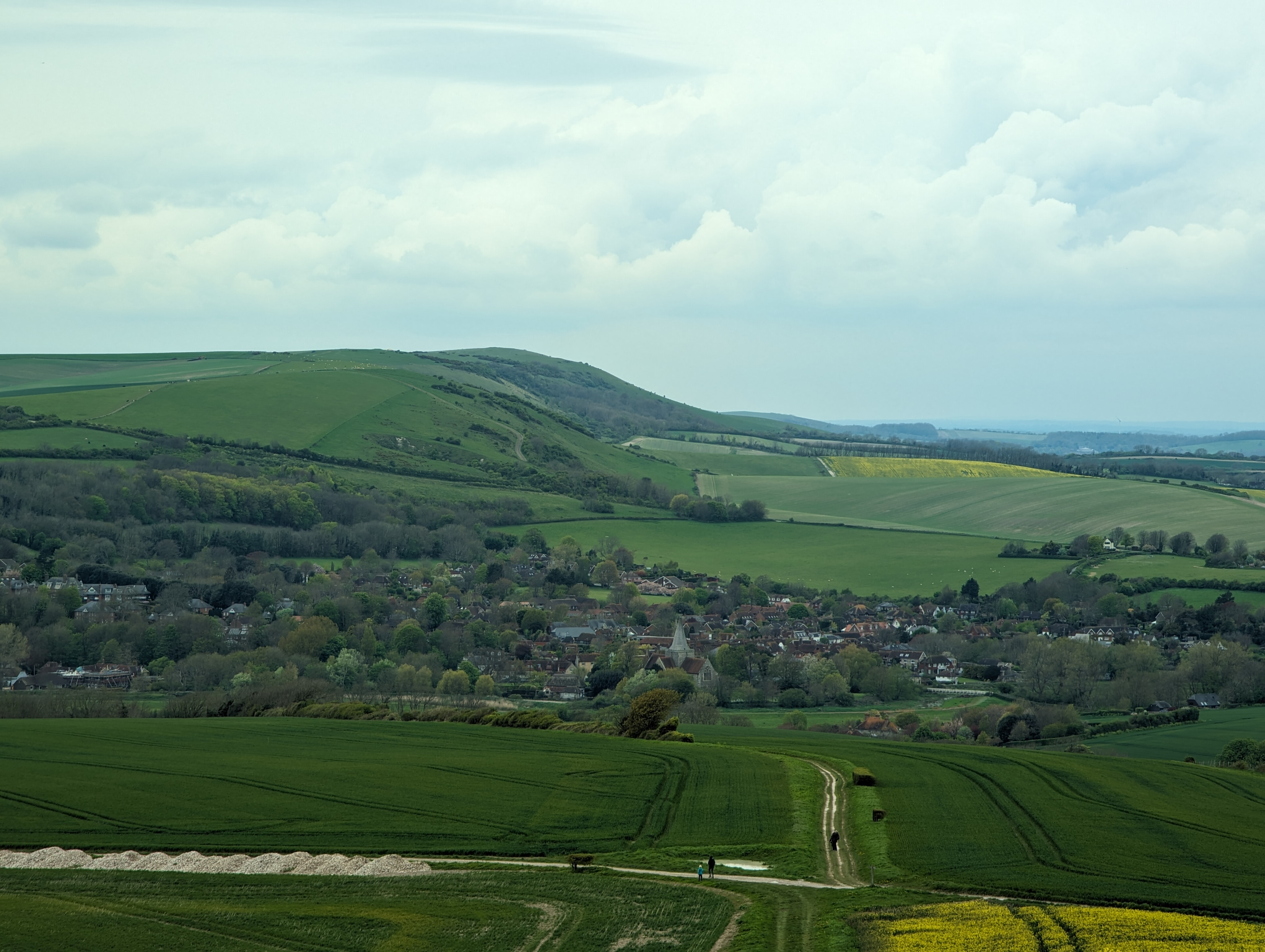
Overview of Litlington, East Sussex taken from the downs.

Litlington is a village and former civil parish, now in the parish of Cuckmere Valley, in the Wealden district of the county of East Sussex, England. It is located 3 miles (4.8 km) ENE of Seaford on the south coast. It was part of a roughly square parish of dramatic chalkland that extends down to a natural pebble coastline at Cuckmere Haven. In 1961, the parish had a population of 117. On 1 April 1990, the parish was abolished and merged with Lullington and Westdean to form Cuckmere Valley.

== Toponymy ==
The name is Saxon and literally means Litl's (followers or possibly family's) homestead. It is also potentially a corruption of Littleton, but there is no evidence for it missing its -ing component.

== Parish description ==
The village is small and like the rest of the parish, which extends to take in much of the Seven Sisters Country Park, is on the left bank of a narrow valley in the signature narrow band of the South Downs National Park. It is downriver followed only by marshes mainly to its side of its road leading to hamlets of Exceat and Westdean but across the narrow road a narrow strip of fertile farmland that ascends rapidly into chalkland grazing.

Beyond the Exceat tiny cluster of homes is footpath access to Cuckmere Haven, which has road access from the west, Seaford only, a natural shoreline of pebbles and the soon towering Seven Sisters cliffs to the east. Among features of the landscape here are sheep fields and pillboxes from World War II.

== Civic, community buildings and river sports ==
Near the narrow, hedge-lined village street, on its offshoot Clapham Lane, is a community hall, built in 1953.

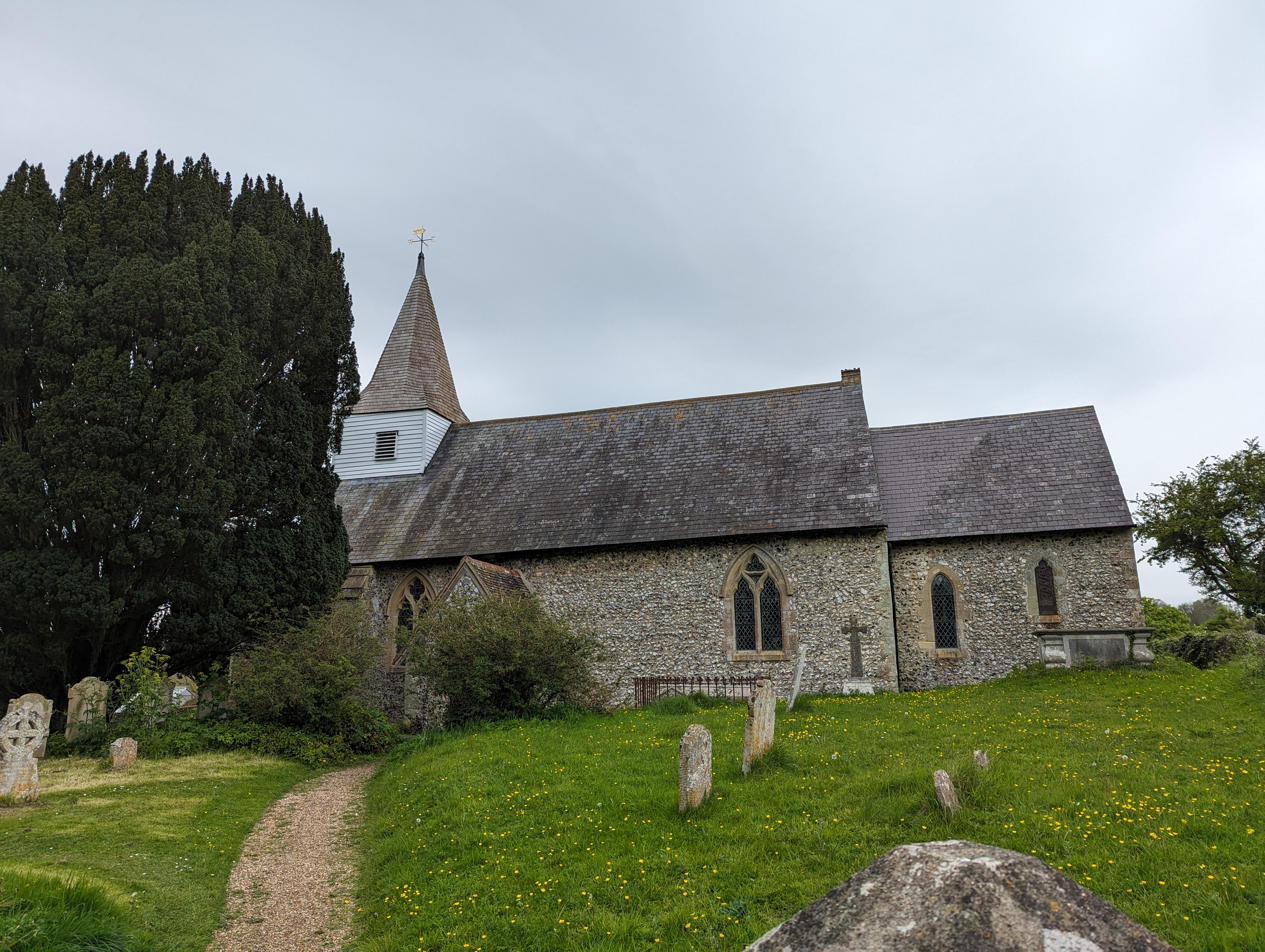
Litlington St. Michael The Archangel

The church is in the opposite direction, medieval and dedicated to St Michael the Archangel. The Church of England's ecclesiastical parish remains Lilington which has this church and no chapels. The church is a flint with stone dressings downland church, with a white painted weather boarded wooden belfry tower supporting a wood-shingle covered spire. Possibly 12th century with earlier windows.

Exceat has a canoe club and a separate paddleboarding experience/outings business.

== Notable residents ==
Maria Fitzherbert, mistress of George IV, lived at Clapham House.

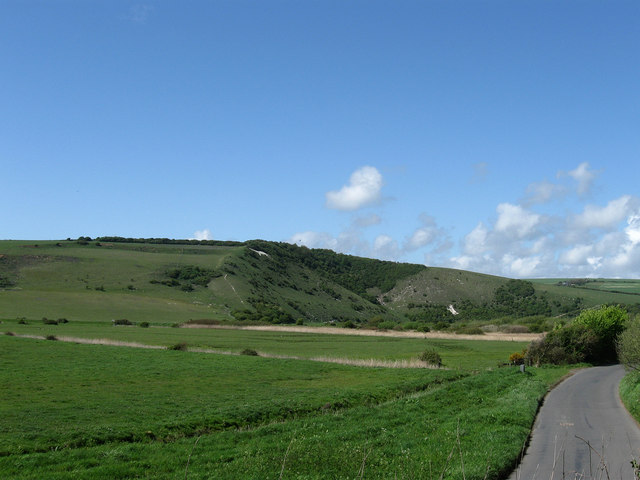
Litlington White Horse

== Economy ==
The village is on popular downland walking trails. The main businesses are:

- a brewery (The Long Man Brewery), that sources its barley from 500 acres surrounding the brewery.
- a crystal and gemstone store,
- and The Plough & Harrow, a large gastropub-type restaurant and free house. It also offers the local ale.

== Litlington White Horse ==
50°47′18″N 0°8′30″E During the 19th century, The Litlington White Horse, being a large chalk figure of a horse, was cut into the face of the downs situated to the west of the village. The figure, the Litlington White Horse, replaced an earlier period of one present many years before. It is one of the nine white horse figures outside Wiltshire, and was the solution to a treasure hunt in the video game Pimania. North of the parish is the Long Man of Wilmington, famous in part because of its unknown origin.
