= Gensing, East Sussex =

Ward in Hastings, East Sussex, England

Coordinates: 50°51′35″N 0°33′34″E

Gensing is a local government ward and district of St Leonards-on-Sea, Hastings, East Sussex. The population of the ward at the 2011 census was 6,591. It is served by St Leonards Warrior Square railway station.

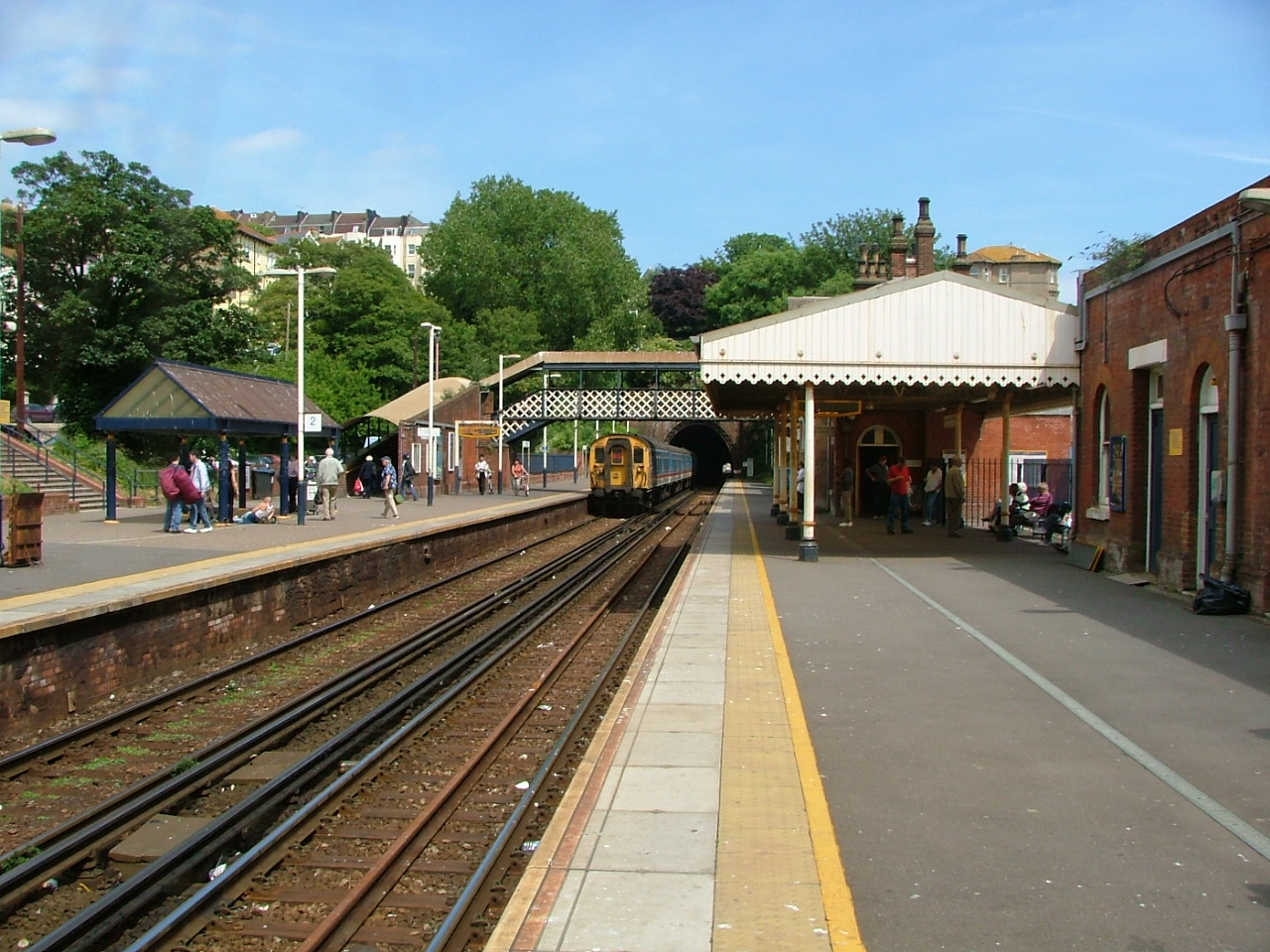
Warrior Square station

== Gensing Station ==
The station building and house still in existence today were constructed in 1849. Originally named Gensing Station, this was owned by the South Eastern Railway (SER), and competing London, Brighton and South Coast Railway (LBSCR) trains were not allowed to stop here until December 1870, being forced to pass through non-stop.
