= Betony =

Betony is a common name for a plant which may refer to:

- Stachys, a genus of plants containing several species commonly known as betony in Europe
  - Stachys officinalis, a historically important medicinal plant
  - Stachys palustris, a related plant with similar uses.
- Pedicularis, a genus of plants containing several species commonly known as betony in North America
