= Wilmington Downs =

Biological site in East Sussex, UK

Coordinates: 50.806°N 0.190°E

- Site of Special Scientific Interest
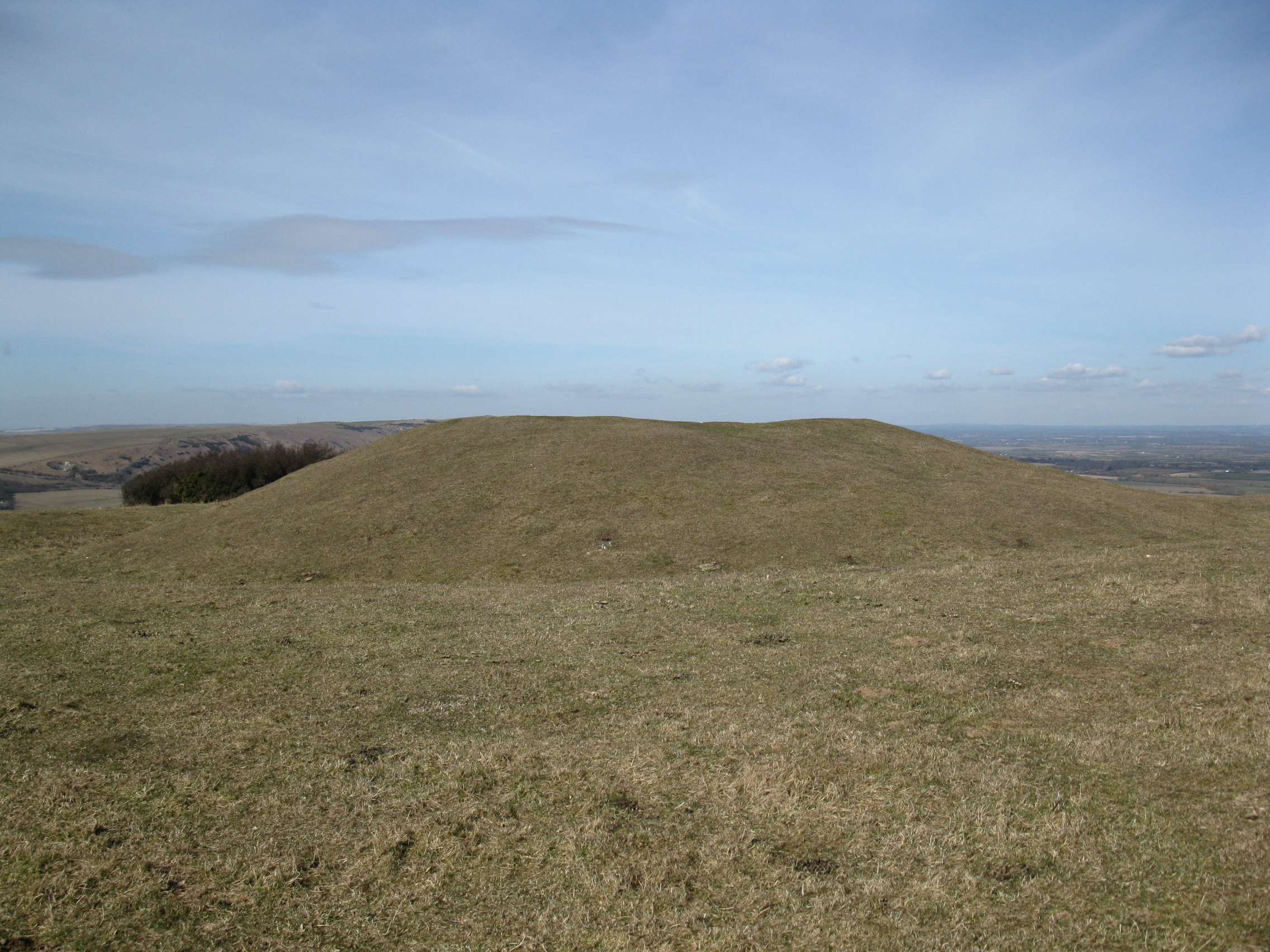
- Location of Wilmington Downs.
- Area of search: East Sussex
- Grid reference: TQ 544 030
- Interest: Biological
- Area: 209.8 hectares (518 acres)
- Notification date: 1986
- Location map: Magic Map

Wilmington Downs is a 209.8-hectare (518-acre) biological Site of Special Scientific Interest north-west of Eastbourne in East Sussex. The site includes a Scheduled Monument, the Long Man of Wilmington, a turf cut figure which may be of prehistoric origin.

This site is mainly chalk grassland on the steep slope of the South Downs. It is important for invertebrates, including two protected under Schedule 5 of the Wildlife and Countryside Act, 1981, the wart-biter grasshopper and the snail Monacha cartusiana. There are also several unusual species of lichens and mosses.
