= Belmont, East Sussex =

Suburb of Hastings, East Sussex, England

Coordinates: 50.86°N 00.59°E

Belmont
- Location within East Sussex
- OS grid reference: TQ8310
- Shire county: East Sussex
- Region: South East
- Country: England
- Sovereign state: United Kingdom
- Post town: Hastings
- Postcode district: TN35
- Police: Sussex
- Fire: East Sussex
- Ambulance: South East Coast

Belmont is a suburb of Hastings in East Sussex, England. The village falls within the Borough of Hastings.
