= Doleham =

Hamlet in East Sussex, England

Coordinates: 50.9202°N 0.6045°E

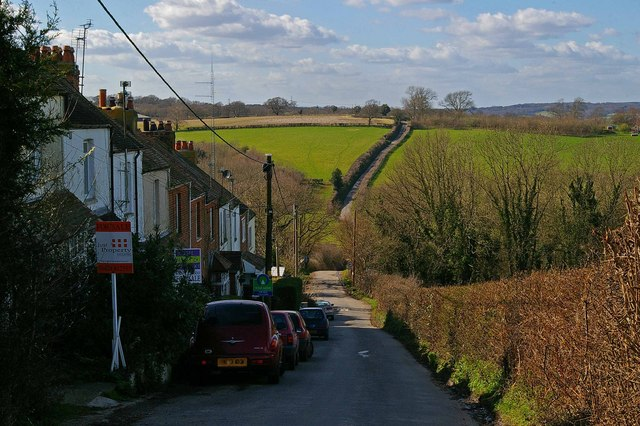
The terraced houses of Doleham

Doleham is a small hamlet in East Sussex, England. The hamlet consists of only a handful of houses, and takes its name from Doleham Farm. The area is popular with walkers at weekends.

The hamlet is served by Doleham railway station.
