= List of settlements in East Sussex by population =

East Sussex's largest settlements, with its city in bold, and district centres in yellow.
East Sussex's 8th–17th largest settlements and district centres in yellow

This is a list of settlements in East Sussex by population based on the results of the 2011 census. The next United Kingdom census will take place in 2021. In 2011, there were 16 built-up area subdivisions with 5,000 or more inhabitants in East Sussex, shown in the table below.

== Population ranking ==
#	Settlement	Borough/ District	Population	
#	Settlement	Borough/ District	2001	2011
1	Brighton and Hove	Brighton and Hove	205,760	229,700
2	Eastbourne	Eastbourne	98,460	109,185
3	Hastings	Hastings	85,830	91,053
4	Bexhill-on-Sea	Rother	39,580	42,369
5	Seaford	Lewes	21,850	22,584
6	Crowborough	Wealden	20,617	21,607
7	Hailsham	Wealden	20,225	20,977
8	Portslade-by-Sea	Brighton and Hove	19,850	19,921
9	Peacehaven	Lewes	17,541	18,579
10	Lewes	Lewes	15,988	17,297
11	Uckfield	Wealden	14,300	15,213
12	Newhaven	Lewes	12,280	13,222
13	Saltdean	Brighton and Hove	11,860	12,936
14	Polegate	Wealden	8,388	9,034
15	Heathfield	Wealden	7,384	7,732
16	Battle	Rother	5,506	6,054
17	Rye	Rother	4,554	4,773

== See also ==
- East Sussex
