= Railway station categories in Great Britain =

Categorisation scheme for railway stations in Great Britain

The 2,536 railway stations on the National Rail network in Great Britain are classified into eight categories by the Department for Transport (DfT). Based on passenger footfall and income, they are categorised from A "national hub" to F2 "small unstaffed" stations. Originally consisting of six categories, the scheme was devised in 1996 as part of the privatisation of British Rail. Following a review in 2009, they are used to set minimum standards for facilities at stations.

== History ==
The scheme was created in 1996, as part of the privatisation of British Rail. Initially there were six categories from A to F, based on annual passenger footfall and income at each station. In 2006, passenger surveys conducted by the Rail Passengers Council found that satisfaction with the facilities of the largest stations in category A was high, but was much lower for smaller stations in categories E and F. In 2009, the independently authored Better Rail Stations report by Chris Green and Peter Hall recommended retaining the scheme, with categories C and F subdivided into two further categories and some stations reallocated. The recommended changes were welcomed by Andrew Adonis on behalf of the UK Government and passed to Network Rail to implement. The report proposed minimum station standards, such as real time information and help points at the lowest category unstaffed locations. They were used to identify stations that had not received adequate investment to meet minimum standards for their category. Ten category B interchange stations were identified as an immediate priority.

== Categories ==
As of March 2022, there are 2,536 stations on the National Rail network in Great Britain. They are divided into categories from A to F. The principal criteria for categorisation is passenger footfall.

Some stations are in more than one category: for instance, at London St Pancras International, the surface platforms are in category A and the Thameslink platforms are in category C1.

Definition and examples of the eight DfT station categories
Category		Number (Note: As of March 2022)	Description	Trips per annum	Annual revenue	Examples	Photo
A		28	National hub	over 2 million	over £20 million	Birmingham New Street; London King's Cross	
B		67	Regional interchange	over 2 million	over £20 million	Guildford; Nottingham	
C (Note: Category C stations are sub-divided into C1 (city or busy junction) and C2 (other busy railheads). The only exception is Worthing, which has not been given a subcategory; it is listed as "C".)	C1	248	Important feeder	0.5–2 million	£2–20 million	Grantham; Plymouth	
C	C2	248	Important feeder	0.5–2 million	£2–20 million	Burgess Hill; Tamworth	
D		298	Medium staffed	0.25–0.5 million	£1–2 million	Abergavenny; Penrith	
E		695	Small staffed	under 0.25 million	under £1 million	Deal; Oakham	
F (Note: Category F stations are sub-divided into F1 (over 100,000 journeys per annum) and F2 (others).)	F1	1,200	Small unstaffed	under 0.25 million	under £1 million	Beccles; Bishop Auckland	
F	F2	1,200	Small unstaffed	under 0.25 million	under £1 million	Llanfairpwll; Winchelsea	
Total		2,536					

The categorisation scheme does not include stations where responsibility has been transferred from Network Rail to Transport for London as part of the London Overground and Elizabeth line, or stations managed by Transport for Wales.

== Purpose ==
The main purpose of the categorisation scheme is to ensure stations have adequate amenities for their role. This could include new station design or accessibility standards.

=== Station design ===
Network Rail's standards for designing new station buildings revolves heavily around the expected footfall. The current standard is the 'HUB station', which is designed for category D–F stations being built or rebuilt from scratch. The design is based on a toolkit concept: for example, the base layout for category F stations has one platform; the base layout for category E stations has an island platform; and the base layout for category D stations has two separate platforms. However, these are adaptable to the location of the station. The most basic station designed, the category F mini station, has a single platform, no car park, and no platform canopy.

Station categories are also considered for staff facilities. For example, a Category A station is suggested to include a kitchenette, 44 desks, and two meeting rooms. However, some facilities are dependent on different factors; for example, terminus stations require greater facilities for staff working and train turnaround.

==== Accessibility standards ====
The Design Standards for Accessible Railway Stations, a document by the Department for Transport and Transport Scotland, bases some of its accessibility guidelines for UK rail stations on station category. For example, all Category A stations must have baby-changing facilities. However, not all policy is more stringent for busier stations: the document acknowledges that category A stations, for example, are not necessarily able to announce all trains in good time.

==== Amenities ====
The amenities available at each station are primarily at the discretion of individual train operating companies, but Network Rail issues guidance as to what facilities should be available at each station category. For example, stations that are category A–B are recommended to have staffed first-class lounges. Public art is mandatory at category A stations, highly desirable at category B stations, and desirable at category C stations. Some types of amenity are both dependent on category and location; for example, see the below table for expected WiFi availability.

WiFi availability in different station categories
		Area in station				
		Egress	Forecourt	Entrance	Waiting area	Platforms
Category	A	Mandatory				
Category	B	Highly desirable	Mandatory	Highly desirable	Mandatory	Highly desirable
Category	C	Desirable	Mandatory	Desirable	Mandatory	Desirable
Category	D	Desirable			Mandatory	Desirable
Category	E	—	Optional	—	Mandatory	—
Category	F	—			Optional	—

=== Security ===
Network Rail considers all category A–C stations high-risk for security incidents. Due to this, all category A stations are required to have first aid rooms, new building design should account for blast protection, and physical barriers to cars driving into station buildings should be considered. However, some security measures, such as CCTV and lighting fixtures, are mandatory at all stations irrespective of their category.

=== International collaboration ===
The United Kingdom railway categorisation scheme forms part of the Station Categorisation Project Group (SCPG) of the International Union of Railways, which was founded in January 2023. There are eleven other Western and Central European countries in the scheme, as well as Canada, the United States, South Korea, and Australia. However, the involved countries differ greatly in the number of categories, category nomenclature, the factors determining a station's category, and the distribution of stations between categories. However, the project group seeks to standardise these factors in the near future.

== See also ==
- German railway station categories
- Netherlands railway station categories
- Polish railway station categories
