= Boreham Street =

Village in East Sussex, England

Coordinates: 50.877215°N 0.366205°E

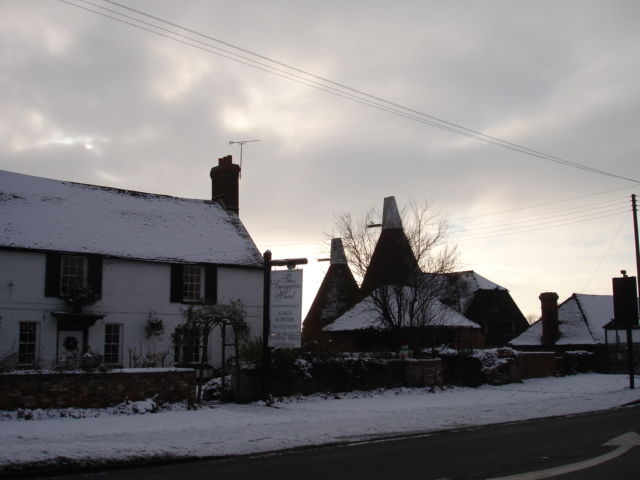
- The Smugglers Wheel pub

- Location within East Sussex
- OS grid reference: TQ6656511302
- Civil parish: Wartling
- District: Wealden
- Shire county: East Sussex
- Region: South East
- Country: England
- Sovereign state: United Kingdom
- Post town: HAILSHAM
- Postcode district: BN27 4
- Dialling code: 01323
- Police: Sussex
- Fire: East Sussex
- Ambulance: South East Coast
- UK Parliament: Wealden

Boreham Street is a small village in the Wealden district of East Sussex, England. Its nearest towns are Hailsham, which lies approximately 6 miles (9.7 km) west of the village and Battle, which lies approximately 6.5 miles (10.5 km) to the east. A number of listed buildings line the village high street. Boreham Street sits atop a ridge with views south over the Pevensey Levels towards Normans Bay and the coast and to the north over open farmland. Boreham Street has the 'Bull's Head' public house. The village hall, Reid Hall, holds local events.
