= Windmill Hill, East Sussex =

Village in East Sussex, England

Coordinates: 50.88641°N 0.34044°E

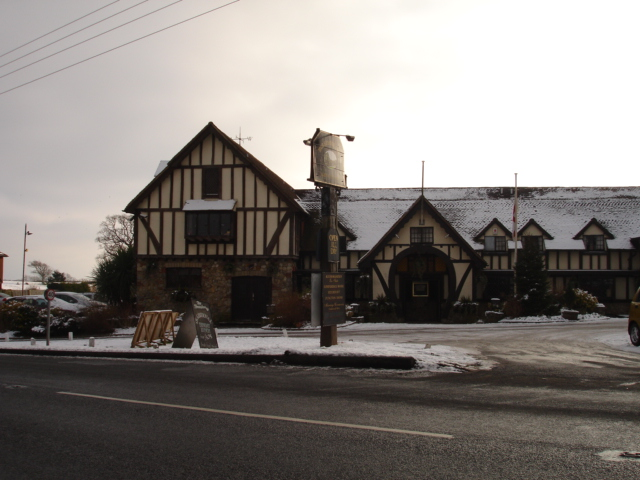
Windmill Hill

Windmill Hill is a village in the civil parish of Herstmonceux, in the Wealden district of East Sussex, England. In 2020 it had an estimated population of 585.
