= Lullington Church =

Church in Lullington, East Sussex, England

Coordinates: 50.807°N 0.167°E

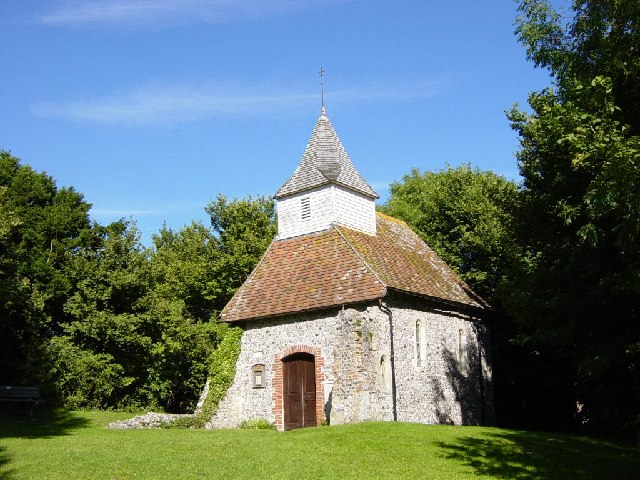
The Church of the Good Shepherd, Lullington

Lullington Church, also known as the Church of the Good Shepherd, on the South Downs at Lullington in East Sussex is one of several churches claimed to be the smallest church in England although it is not the smallest. It was built from the remains of the chancel of an earlier church that was destroyed by fire, generally believed to have occurred at the time of Oliver Cromwell. It measures 256 sq ft (24 m^{2}) and seats 20 people.

The original church is believed to date from the late 12th or early 13th century and was built as a chapel in the parish of Alfriston, owned by Battle Abbey, and later became a separate parish. A will from 1521 suggests that at the time the church contained a statue of St Zita. In 1927 the parishes of Alfriston and Lullington were merged. The original dedication of the church is unknown, and in 2000 the Bishop of Chichester dedicated the church to the Good Shepherd. The church features a harmonium estimated to be from the end of the 19th century.

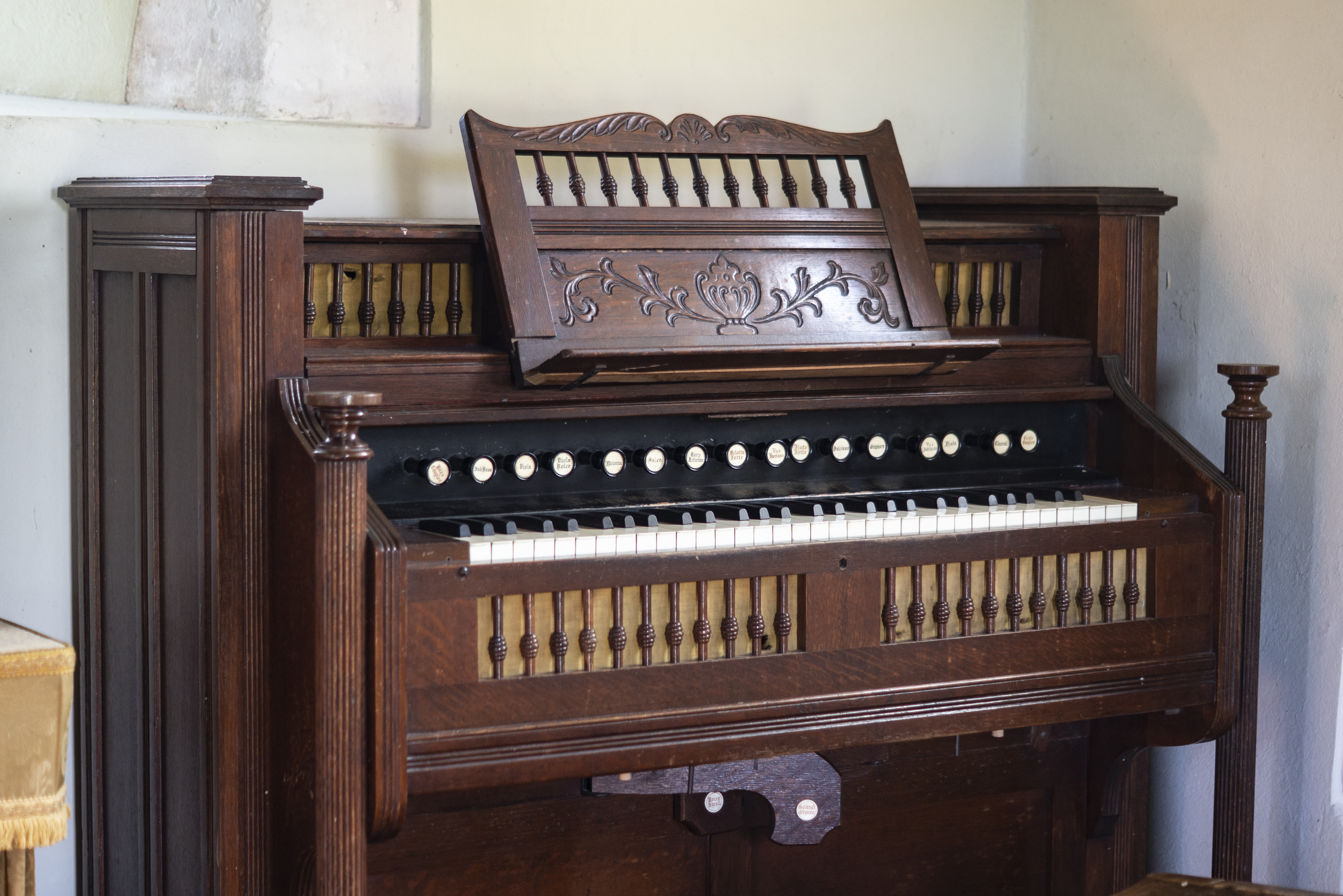
The harmonium inside Lullington Church

The church was the inspiration for the 2003 song "The Smallest Church in Sussex" by British alternative rock band Sea Power. The track is a b-side to "Remember Me" and features the church's harmonium, recorded in situ, as the only accompanying instrument.

== See also ==
- List of current places of worship in Wealden
