= Seahaven, East Sussex =

Area in East Sussex, England

Coordinates: 50.784°N 0.061°E

Seahaven is a name given to the area in East Sussex that includes the towns of Seaford and Newhaven and Peacehaven and the surrounding towns in the Ouse Valley which leads to the East Sussex county town of Lewes.

The Seahaven name is used by the sports centre in Newhaven, the local police force, the local community radio station and many businesses.
