= List of United Kingdom locations: Upper A-Upper H =

The United Kingdom

This is part of the list of United Kingdom locations: a gazetteer of place names in the United Kingdom showing each place's locality and geographical coordinates.

== Upper A-H ==
Location	Locality	Coordinates (links to map & photo sources)	OS grid reference
Upper Affcot	Shropshire	52.46°N 02.82°W	SO4486
Upper Ardchronie	Highland	57.86°N 04.36°W	NH6088
Upper Arley	Worcestershire	52.41°N 02.35°W	SO7680
Upper Armley	Leeds	53.80°N 01.60°W	SE2634
Upper Arncott	Oxfordshire	51.84°N 01.11°W	SP6117
Upper Astley	Shropshire	52.75°N 02.69°W	SJ5318
Upper Aston	Shropshire	52.53°N 02.28°W	SO8193
Upper Astrop	Northamptonshire	52.02°N 01.25°W	SP5137
Upper Badcall	Highland	58.31°N 05.16°W	NC1541
Upper Bangor	Gwynedd	53.22°N 04.14°W	SH5772
Upper Basildon	Berkshire	51.48°N 01.15°W	SU5976
Upper Batley	Kirklees	53.72°N 01.63°W	SE2425
Upper Battlefield	Shropshire	52.74°N 02.72°W	SJ5117
Upper Beeding	West Sussex	50.87°N 00.30°W	TQ1910
Upper Belvedere	Bexley	51.479°N 00.142°E	TQ489777
Upper Benefield	Northamptonshire	52.49°N 00.55°W	SP9889
Upper Bentley	Worcestershire	52.29°N 02.01°W	SO9966
Upper Bighouse	Highland	58.48°N 03.92°W	NC8857
Upper Birchwood	Derbyshire	53.08°N 01.35°W	SK4354
Upper Blainslie	Scottish Borders	55.68°N 02.74°W	NT5344
Upper Boat	Rhondda, Cynon, Taff	51.57°N 03.30°W	ST1087
Upper Boddam	Aberdeenshire	57.35°N 02.63°W	NJ6230
Upper Boddington	Northamptonshire	52.17°N 01.29°W	SP4853
Upper Bonchurch	Isle of Wight	50.59°N 01.19°W	SZ5778
Upper Booth	Derbyshire	53.36°N 01.85°W	SK1085
Upper Borth	Ceredigion	52.47°N 04.06°W	SN6088
Upper Boyndlie	Aberdeenshire	57.64°N 02.16°W	NJ9062
Upper Brailes	Warwickshire	52.04°N 01.56°W	SP3039
Upper Brandon Parva	Norfolk	52.63°N 01.01°E	TG0408
Upper Breakish	Highland	57.23°N 05.84°W	NG6823
Upper Breinton	Herefordshire	52.05°N 02.78°W	SO4640
Upper Broadheath	Worcestershire	52.20°N 02.29°W	SO8056
Upper Brockholes	Calderdale	53.75°N 01.91°W	SE0629
Upper Broughton	Nottinghamshire	52.82°N 00.99°W	SK6826
Upper Broxwood	Herefordshire	52.17°N 02.93°W	SO3653
Upper Bruntingthorpe	Leicestershire	52.48°N 01.11°W	SP6088
Upper Brynamman	Carmarthenshire	51.80°N 03.87°W	SN7114
Upper Buckenhill	Herefordshire	51.99°N 02.59°W	SO5933
Upper Bucklebury	Berkshire	51.40°N 01.22°W	SU5468
Upper Bullington	Hampshire	51.16°N 01.34°W	SU4641
Upper Burgate	Hampshire	50.94°N 01.78°W	SU1516
Upper Bush	Kent	51.36°N 00.42°E	TQ6966
Upperby	Cumbria	54.86°N 02.93°W	NY4053
Upper Caldecote	Bedfordshire	52.09°N 00.30°W	TL1645
Upper Cam	Gloucestershire	51.68°N 02.36°W	ST7599
Upper Canada	North Somerset	51.31°N 02.91°W	ST3658
Upper Canterton	Hampshire	50.90°N 01.63°W	SU2612
Upper Catesby	Northamptonshire	52.22°N 01.24°W	SP5259
Upper Catshill	Worcestershire	52.36°N 02.06°W	SO9674
Upper Chapel	Powys	52.04°N 03.45°W	SO0040
Upper Cheddon	Somerset	51.04°N 03.09°W	ST2328
Upper Chicksgrove	Wiltshire	51.06°N 02.05°W	ST9629
Upper Church Village	Rhondda, Cynon, Taff	51.56°N 03.32°W	ST0886
Upper Chute	Wiltshire	51.27°N 01.58°W	SU2953
Upper Clapton	Hackney	51.56°N 00.06°W	TQ3487
Upper Clatford	Hampshire	51.18°N 01.50°W	SU3543
Upper Coberley	Gloucestershire	51.83°N 02.04°W	SO9715
Upper College	Shropshire	52.90°N 02.64°W	SJ5734
Upper Colwall	Herefordshire	52.08°N 02.35°W	SO7643
Upper Common	Hampshire	51.20°N 01.09°W	SU6345
Upper Cotton	Staffordshire	53.02°N 01.92°W	SK0547
Upper Cound	Shropshire	52.63°N 02.66°W	SJ5504
Upper Coxley	Somerset	51.18°N 02.67°W	ST5343
Upper Cudworth	Barnsley	53.57°N 01.42°W	SE3809
Upper Cumberworth	Kirklees	53.56°N 01.68°W	SE2108
Upper Cwmbran	Torfaen	51.65°N 03.05°W	ST2796
Upperdale	Derbyshire	53.24°N 01.74°W	SK1772
Upperdale	Shetland Islands	60.26°N 01.65°W	HU1953
Upper Dallachy	Moray	57.64°N 03.07°W	NJ3662
Upper Deal	Kent	51.20°N 01.37°E	TR3651
Upper Dean	Bedfordshire	52.29°N 00.47°W	TL0467
Upper Dean	Devon	50.46°N 03.80°W	SX7264
Upper Denby (Denby Dale)	Kirklees	53.55°N 01.66°W	SE2207
Upper Denby (Kirkburton)	Kirklees	53.64°N 01.65°W	SE2316
Upper Denton	Cumbria	54.97°N 02.61°W	NY6165
Upper Diabaig	Highland	57.57°N 05.66°W	NG8160
Upper Dicker	East Sussex	50.86°N 00.20°E	TQ5510
Upper Dinchope	Shropshire	52.44°N 02.81°W	SO4583
Upper Dormington	Herefordshire	52.04°N 02.61°W	SO5839
Upper Dounreay	Highland	58.56°N 03.72°W	ND0065
Upper Dovercourt	Essex	51.92°N 01.24°E	TM2330
Upper Dowdeswell	Gloucestershire	51.86°N 02.00°W	SP0019
Upper Drummond	Highland	57.45°N 04.23°W	NH6643
Upper Dunsforth	North Yorkshire	54.06°N 01.32°W	SE4463
Upper Dunsley	Hertfordshire	51.79°N 00.65°W	SP9311
Upper Eashing	Surrey	51.17°N 00.64°W	SU9543
Upper Eastern Green	Solihull	52.41°N 01.60°W	SP2780
Upper Edmonton	Enfield	51.61°N 00.06°W	TQ3492
Upper Egleton	Herefordshire	52.09°N 02.54°W	SO6344
Upper Elkstone	Staffordshire	53.11°N 01.92°W	SK0558
Upper Ellastone	Staffordshire	52.98°N 01.83°W	SK1143
Upper Elmers End	London Borough of Bromley	51.38°N 00.04°W	TQ3667
Upper End	Derbyshire	53.28°N 01.88°W	SK0876
Upper End (Bagendon)	Gloucestershire	51.75°N 02.00°W	SP0006
Upper End (Northleach)	Gloucestershire	51.81°N 01.82°W	SP1213
Upper End	Leicestershire	52.71°N 00.90°W	SK7414
Upper Enham	Hampshire	51.23°N 01.48°W	SU3649
Upper Farmcote	Shropshire	52.51°N 02.34°W	SO7791
Upper Farringdon	Hampshire	51.11°N 00.98°W	SU7135
Upper Feorlig	Highland	57.40°N 06.51°W	NG2944
Upper Fivehead	Somerset	51.00°N 02.94°W	ST3423
Upper Forge	Shropshire	52.49°N 02.41°W	SO7289
Upper Framilode	Gloucestershire	51.78°N 02.36°W	SO7510
Upper Froyle	Hampshire	51.17°N 00.92°W	SU7542
Upper Gambolds	Worcestershire	52.31°N 02.04°W	SO9768
Upper Gills	Highland	58.62°N 03.17°W	ND3271
Upper Godney	Somerset	51.17°N 02.74°W	ST4842
Upper Goldstone	Kent	51.29°N 01.28°E	TR2960
Upper Gornal	Dudley	52.52°N 02.11°W	SO9292
Upper Gravenhurst	Bedfordshire	52.01°N 00.38°W	TL1136
Upper Green	Berkshire	51.36°N 01.48°W	SU3663
Upper Green	Essex	51.98°N 00.09°E	TL4434
Upper Green	Leeds	53.72°N 01.59°W	SE2725
Upper Green	Monmouthshire	51.85°N 02.90°W	SO3818
Upper Green	Suffolk	52.24°N 00.54°E	TL7464
Upper Grove Common	Herefordshire	51.93°N 02.65°W	SO5526
Upper Guist	Norfolk	52.79°N 00.96°E	TG0026
Upper Hackney	Derbyshire	53.14°N 01.56°W	SK2961
Upper Hale	Surrey	51.23°N 00.79°W	SU8449
Upper Halistra	Highland	57.53°N 06.61°W	NG2459
Upper Halliford	Surrey	51.40°N 00.43°W	TQ0968
Upper Halling	Kent	51.35°N 00.42°E	TQ6964
Upper Ham	Worcestershire	52.04°N 02.22°W	SO8539
Upper Hambleton	Rutland	52.65°N 00.67°W	SK9007
Upper Hamnish	Herefordshire	52.22°N 02.67°W	SO5459
Upper Handwick	Angus	56.56°N 03.04°W	NO3642
Upper Harbledown	Kent	51.28°N 01.02°E	TR1158
Upper Hardres Court	Kent	51.20°N 01.07°E	TR1550
Upper Hardwick	Herefordshire	52.20°N 02.87°W	SO4057
Upper Hartfield	East Sussex	51.08°N 00.08°E	TQ4634
Upper Hartshay	Derbyshire	53.04°N 01.43°W	SK3850
Upper Haselor	Worcestershire	52.06°N 01.98°W	SP0141
Upper Hatton	Staffordshire	52.93°N 02.25°W	SJ8337
Upper Haugh	Rotherham	53.46°N 01.36°W	SK4297
Upper Hayesden	Kent	51.17°N 00.23°E	TQ5644
Upper Hayton	Shropshire	52.42°N 02.72°W	SO5181
Upper Heaton	Kirklees	53.66°N 01.72°W	SE1819
Upper Hellesdon	Norfolk	52.65°N 01.28°E	TG2211
Upper Helmsley	North Yorkshire	53.99°N 00.94°W	SE6956
Upper Hengoed	Shropshire	52.89°N 03.07°W	SJ2834
Upper Hergest	Herefordshire	52.17°N 03.08°W	SO2654
Upper Heyford	Northamptonshire	52.22°N 01.03°W	SP6659
Upper Heyford	Oxfordshire	51.93°N 01.28°W	SP4926
Upper Hill	Herefordshire	52.17°N 02.77°W	SO4753
Upper Hill	South Gloucestershire	51.66°N 02.50°W	ST6596
Upper Hindhope	Scottish Borders	55.37°N 02.38°W	NT7609
Upper Hockenden	Kent	51.406°N 00.155°E	TQ500696
Upper Holloway	Camden	51.55°N 00.14°W	TQ2986
Upper Holton	Suffolk	52.34°N 01.52°E	TM4078
Upper Hopton	Kirklees	53.65°N 01.71°W	SE1918
Upper Horsebridge	East Sussex	50.87°N 00.24°E	TQ5811
Upper Howsell	Worcestershire	52.13°N 02.33°W	SO7748
Upper Hoyland	Barnsley	53.50°N 01.47°W	SE3501
Upper Hulme	Staffordshire	53.13°N 01.98°W	SK0160
Upper Hyde	Isle of Wight	50.62°N 01.19°W	SZ5781
