= Ashcombe (disambiguation) =

Ashcombe is a village and civil parish in the Teignbridge district of Devon, England.

Ashcombe may also refer to:

- Baron Ashcombe, a title in the Peerage of the United Kingdom
- The Ashcombe School, Dorking, Surrey, England
- Ashcombe Volleyball Club, Dorking, Surrey, England
- George Shorrock Ashcombe Wheatcroft (1905-1987), English chess master
- Herbert Ashcombe Walker (1868-1949), British railway manager

== See also ==
- Ashcombe Bottom, a woodland valley in East Sussex
- Ashcombe House (disambiguation); includes Ashcombe Park
- Ashcombe Mill, Kingston, a post mill near the village of Kingston near Lewes, East Sussex, England
- Ayshcombe baronets, a former title in the Baronetage of England
