= Listed buildings in Astley =

Listed buildings in Astley may refer to:

- Listed buildings in Astley, Greater Manchester
- Listed buildings in Astley, Shropshire
- Listed buildings in Astley Abbotts, Shropshire
