= Francis Billingsley =

Colonel Sir Francis Billingsley (1595–1646) was a Royalist officer in the English Civil War. Placed in charge of the defences of Bridgnorth in Shropshire, he was killed in the churchyard of St Leonard's when the town was stormed by Parliamentarian troops on 31 March 1646.

His rapier was presented to the church by one of his descendants (Lois Astley) and for many years was on display in the church. It was stolen in around 2000 and has not been recovered.

== Family and background ==
Coat of Arms of Francis Billingsley

Sir Francis was from the Billingsley family of Astley Abbotts, Shropshire, and married Eleanor Kerry in 1616.

Amongst his siblings was the celebrated horseman Sir Thomas Billingsley. Another brother was Capt. John Billingsley, who supported Parliament during the Civil War and was brother-in-law to the Regicide Daniel Blagrave.

Amongst the children of Sir Francis and Eleanor were Francis Billingsley who served as a major in the Royalist army, and Capt. Edward Billingsley who married a daughter of another Royalist officer, Francis Sandford, and served in Ireland during the 1640s.
