= Horton Clay Pit =

Geological site in West Sussex

Coordinates: 50.899°N 0.278°W

- Site of Special Scientific Interest
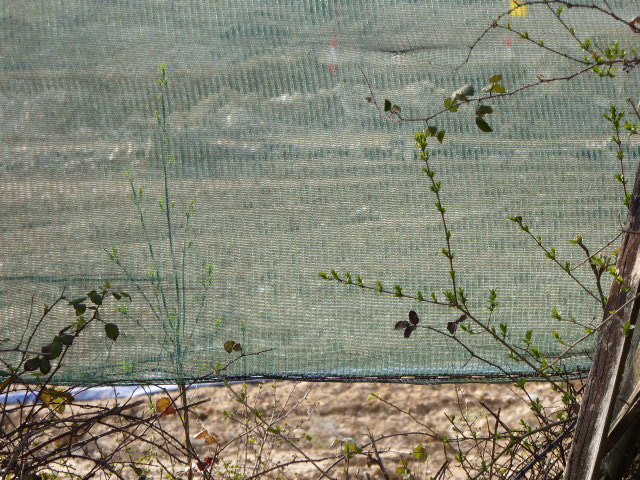
- Location of Horton Clay Pit.
- Area of search: West Sussex
- Grid reference: TQ 212 125
- Interest: Geological
- Area: 0.4 hectares (0.99 acres)
- Notification date: 1991
- Location map: Magic Map

Horton Clay Pit is a 0.4-hectare (0.99-acre) geological Site of Special Scientific Interest in Small Dole in West Sussex. It is a Geological Conservation Review site. It was once much bigger and a popular area for looking for fossils and many marine creatures have been found in the Gault Clay by professional and amateur fossil hunters alike, especially molluscs - ammonites and belemnites, bivalves and gastropods.

This site displays a thick and stratigraphically important sequence of rocks dating to the Folkestone Beds of the Early Cretaceous. It shows evidence of a major structural basin which controlled sedimentation in the western Weald.

In 1913 a series of beetle fossils were recovered from its peaty bed. Researchers have used these fossils to suggest a detailed picture of the local environment during the Weichselian glaciation period and have concluded that a sour pool existed here in open heathland with a few coniferous trees. Through Mutual Climatic Range analysis they have predicted that although July was only a mean 1 degree cooler, January was 6 degree cooler.

In 1991, the clay pit was granted planning consent for restoration using landfilling. The landfill lies on one side of a shallow excavation with the SSSI lying on the other side. More recently plans have been drawn to bury the SSSI with inert infill to prevent further erosion. This has been agreed in principle by Natural England if the Gault Clay is protected by a marker layer. Additional grassland and woodland planting have been promised that will enable habitat linkages across the restored landfill.
