= St Ann Without =

Civil parish in East Sussex, England

Coordinates: 50.87°N 0.04°W

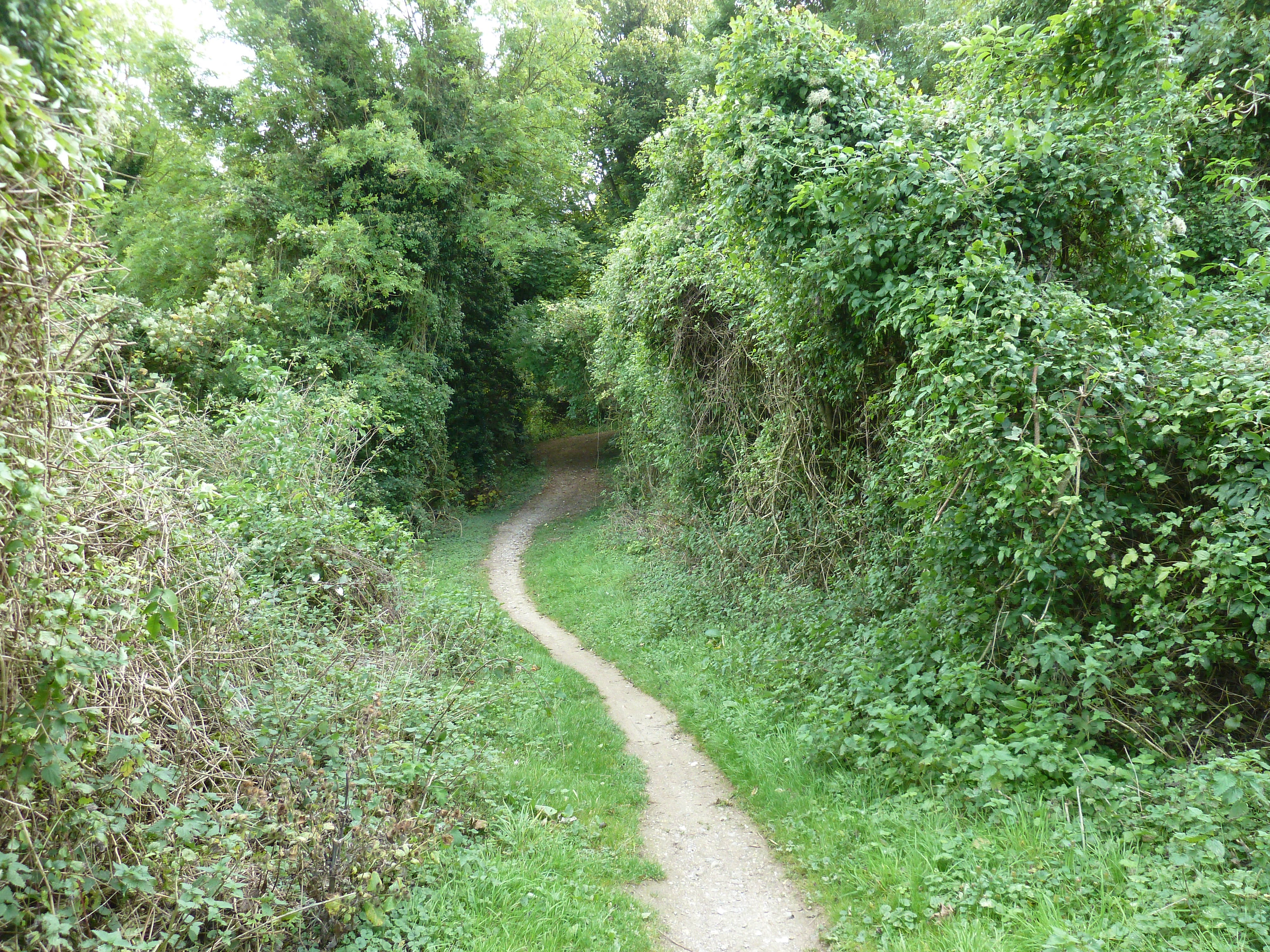
- South Downs Way entering Bunkershill Plantation

- Location within East Sussex
- Area: 17.0 km^{2} (6.6 sq mi) - inc Falmer
- Population: 281 (Parish-2007) includes Falmer
  - Density: 43/sq mi (17/km^{2})
- OS grid reference: TQ382092
  - London: 44 miles (71 km) N
- District: Lewes
- Shire county: East Sussex
- Region: South East
- Country: England
- Sovereign state: United Kingdom
- Post town: LEWES
- Postcode district: BN7
- Dialling code: 01273
- Police: Sussex
- Fire: East Sussex
- Ambulance: South East Coast
- UK Parliament: Lewes

St Ann Without is a civil parish in the Lewes District of East Sussex, England. It covers an area to the west of the town of Lewes, including Long Hill.

Much like its brother parish, St John Without, the parish was formed in 1894 as Lewes St Ann Without from the part of the ancient parish of Lewes St Ann outside (that is, 'without', as opposed to 'within') the borough of Lewes.

== Notable Buildings and Areas ==
Notable areas around St Anns Without

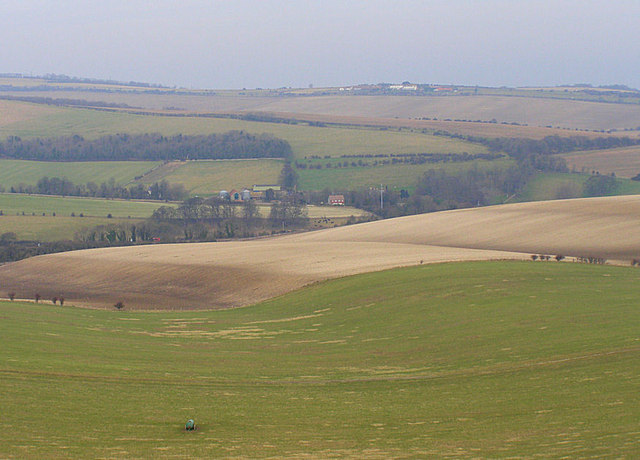
Ashcombe Farm from Kingston Ridge - looking over Scabby Brow

Notable for its small size, St Ann's Without is a wholly downland parish with only one notable small settlement at Newmarket and a Grade II listed building, Ashcombe House which dates to the 18th century. It is now divided by the A27, but has some special downland areas and has well trod paths for the people of Lewes, which sits to its east, wishing to enjoy the Sussex Downs. To its west is the Falmer parish, to its north Hamsey and to its south Kingston.

=== South of the A27 ===
The area to the south of the A27 is quite a small area, but it has the Newmarket petrol garage and a number of cottages. The Lewes to Brighton train line runs alongside the road. To the south is Scabby Brow.

==== Newmarket ====
The Newmarket area has the Newmarket Inn, a petrol garage and a number of cottages.

==== Scabby Brow ====
Looking up from Newmarket or north from Kingston Hill, below the scarp, there is a great arable field with two steep slopes. The western slope (TQ 380 088) still retains its old Down pasture, though in poor condition in recent years (2021). There are still cowslips, fragrant orchids, milkwort and dropwort, which support a rich array of insects, butterflies and moths.

The slope to the east, known as Scabby Brow (TQ 384 088), was also relict Down pasture and dense scrub, supporting pyramidal orchis, scabious, knapweed, and breeding whitethroat, but, despite complaints by locals and DEFRA's intervention, the farmer bulldozed the site and converted it to arable in the early years of the 21st century.

==== Ashcombe Toll House ====
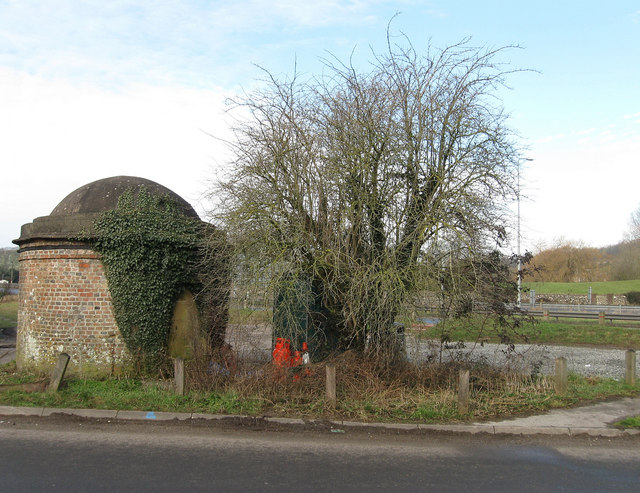
Ashcombe toll house

Ashcombe Toll House stands on the corner of Ashcombe Hollow that runs up to Kingston from the A27. It is a relic from the age of the turnpike. Originally there were a pair but the northern one has been lost to road widening. The tollgate opened in 1820 and is likely to have closed when the turnpike was wound up in 1871. Some have speculated that what remains may have been the domestic part of the tollgate due to the existence of fireplaces. The roof was originally bricked in a circular fashion but was stolen in the 1940s before East Sussex County Council restored it in the 1950s. After that ownership became a little blurred until it was finally claimed by Sussex Heritage Trust in 1996.

=== North of the A27 ===
People of Lewes come to St Ann Without on their walks on to the South Downs. Despite being heavily agricultural there are a number of areas of interest,

==== Ashcombe House ====
Ashcombe Farm (TQ 385 095) is beautifully folded in the shelter of 18th century Ashcombe plantation. It has a handsome Georgian manor house and old flint barns and cottages. It was owned by the University of Sussex until 1985.

==== The Racecourse ====
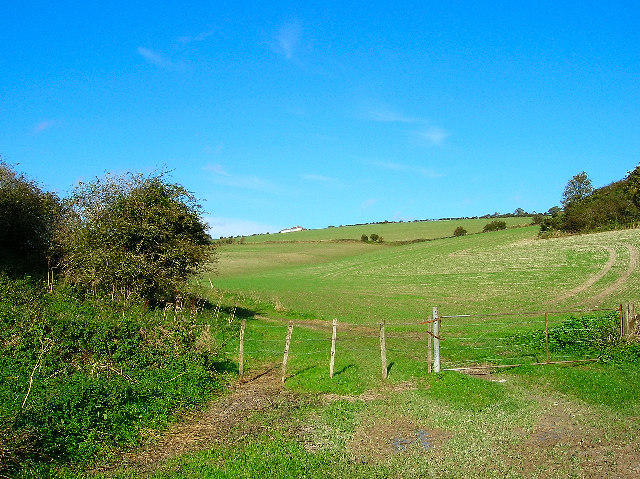
Looking to point where two footpaths meet towards the former grandstand of Lewes racecourse on the summit.

The old racecourse (TQ 39 11) was preserved as a training gallops after its closure in 1964. It runs in a giant loop from Lewes Prison up the Spital ridge from Spital Road, Lewes, almost to the scarp, then runs south along the next ridge, above Ashcombe. It embraced giant Down pastures covering Cuckoo Bottom and Offham Down, and most of Houndean and Landport Bottom.

==== The Gallop ====
The Spital Gallop (TQ 398 103) is part of the old Lewes Racecourse. It has views of the Lewes Brooks (the Vale of the Brooks) and of Malling Down. One can follow the course of the Ouse from there. It was once mostly ancient chalk grassland and chalk heath, but all that has now been lost to scrub and arable tillage. There are a number of ancient barrows in the area but most of them hard to find. One along the worn tracksides was still visible even after the turn of the century, and a rich fragment of old Down pasture flora survived on top and around it with rare bastard toadflax, horseshoe vetch, autumn gentian, thyme and the lichen, Cladonia rangiformis, but all that has now been lost to scrub encroachment.

==== Long Hill ====
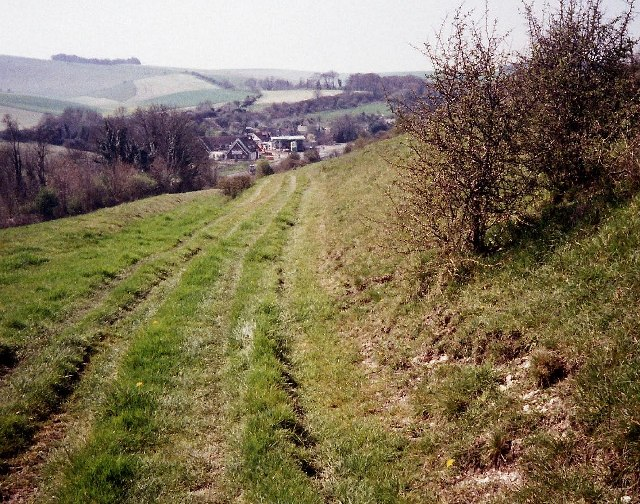
Path down to the A27 from Long Hill

Long Hill (TQ 376 093) is just to the north of the A27 above Newmarket. An ancient terrace way (TQ 381 092), now a public footpath, rises from the A27 opposite Newmarket to the top of Long Hill above Ashcombe Farm. It forms a fine corridor of ancient turf and the two little white ghosts, mullein wave moth and white plume moth, can be found there on a summer's evening amongst the pyramidal orchid, crested hairgrass, hairy rock-cress, milkwort and Sussex Rampion.

The south face of Long Hill (TQ 375 092) is not rich in old Down pasture herbs, but is still flowery in parts. The north face, however, is a very flowery and protected from the noise of the A27. There are fragrant, pyramidal and spotted orchids, cowslips, chalk and common milkworts, heath speedwell, betony, devil’s-bit, lesser scabious, rockrose, ox-eye daisy and the round-headed rampion.

==== Bunkershill Plantation ====
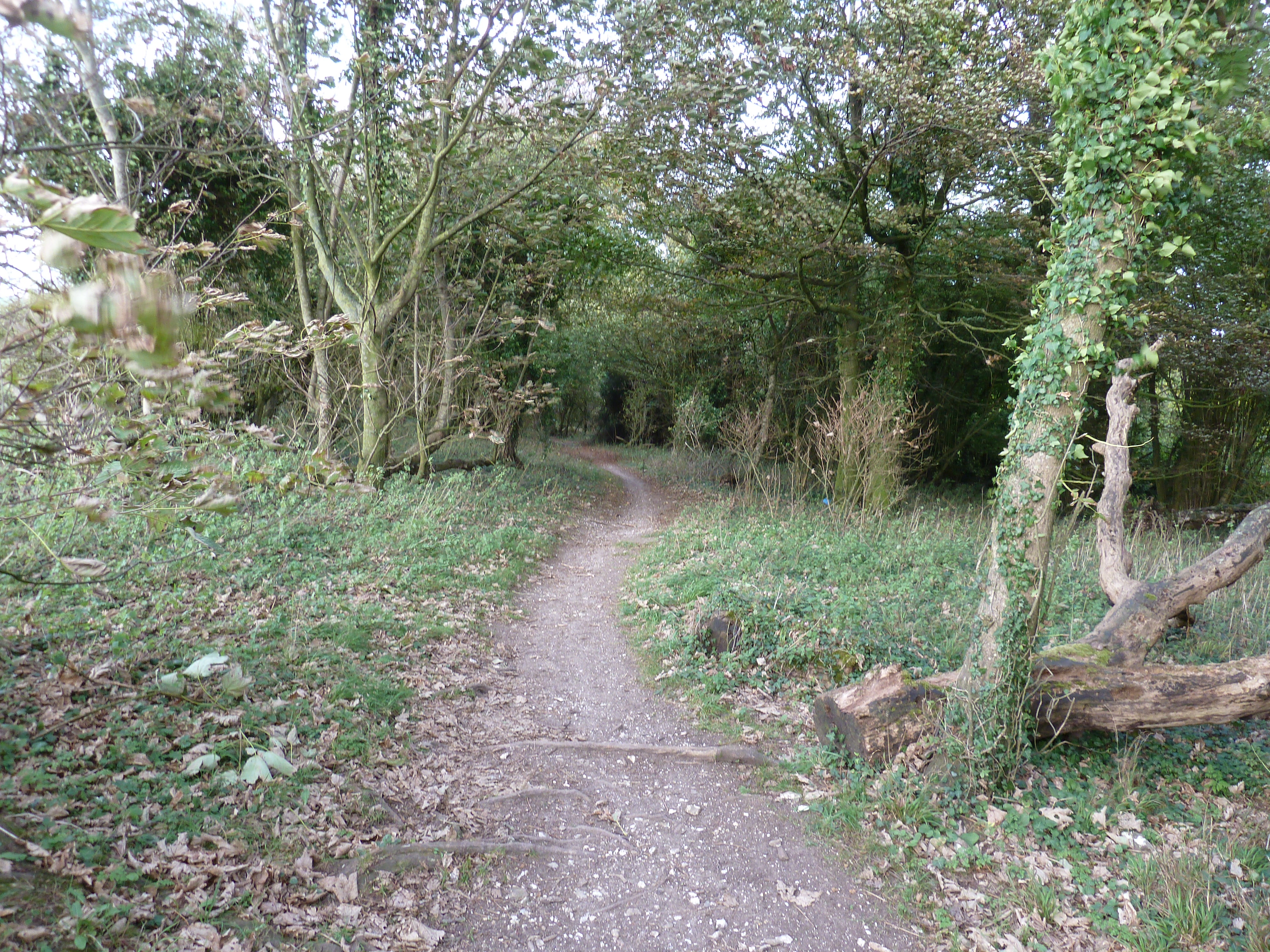
Bunkershill Plantation

Bunkershill Plantation (TQ 372 097) runs alongside the South Downs Way. It is perhaps 230 years old and was named after the British victory at Bunkers Hill in the American revolutionary war. There are old beech at the base of the slope, at its centre is much hazel and a huge pollard beech, which is worth seeking out, and in the rest sycamore dominates. Marsh Gentian has been found in the area.

==== Cuckoo Bottom ====
To the west of the old racecourse buildings lies Cuckoo Bottom (TQ 388 107). It is a mile by half a mile long. It is a shallow, dry valley with dense thorn scrub, young woodland and open, long views. No ancient chalk grassland survives there. The farmed land is all arable.

== Governance ==
On a local level, St Ann Without is governed as a Parish meeting.

The next level of government is the district council. The parish of St Ann Without lies within the Kingston ward of Lewes District Council, which returns a single seat to the council.

East Sussex County Council is the next tier of government, for which St Ann Without is within the Newhaven and Ouse Valley West division, with responsibility for Education, Libraries, Social Services, Civil Registration, Trading Standards and Transport. Elections for the County Council are held every four years.

St Ann Without is represented in the UK Parliament by the Lewes constituency. The current serving MP is the Liberal Democrat James MacCleary who won the seat in the 2024 general election.
