= Upper Beeding =

Village and parish in West Sussex, England

Coordinates: 50.88228°N 0.30515°W

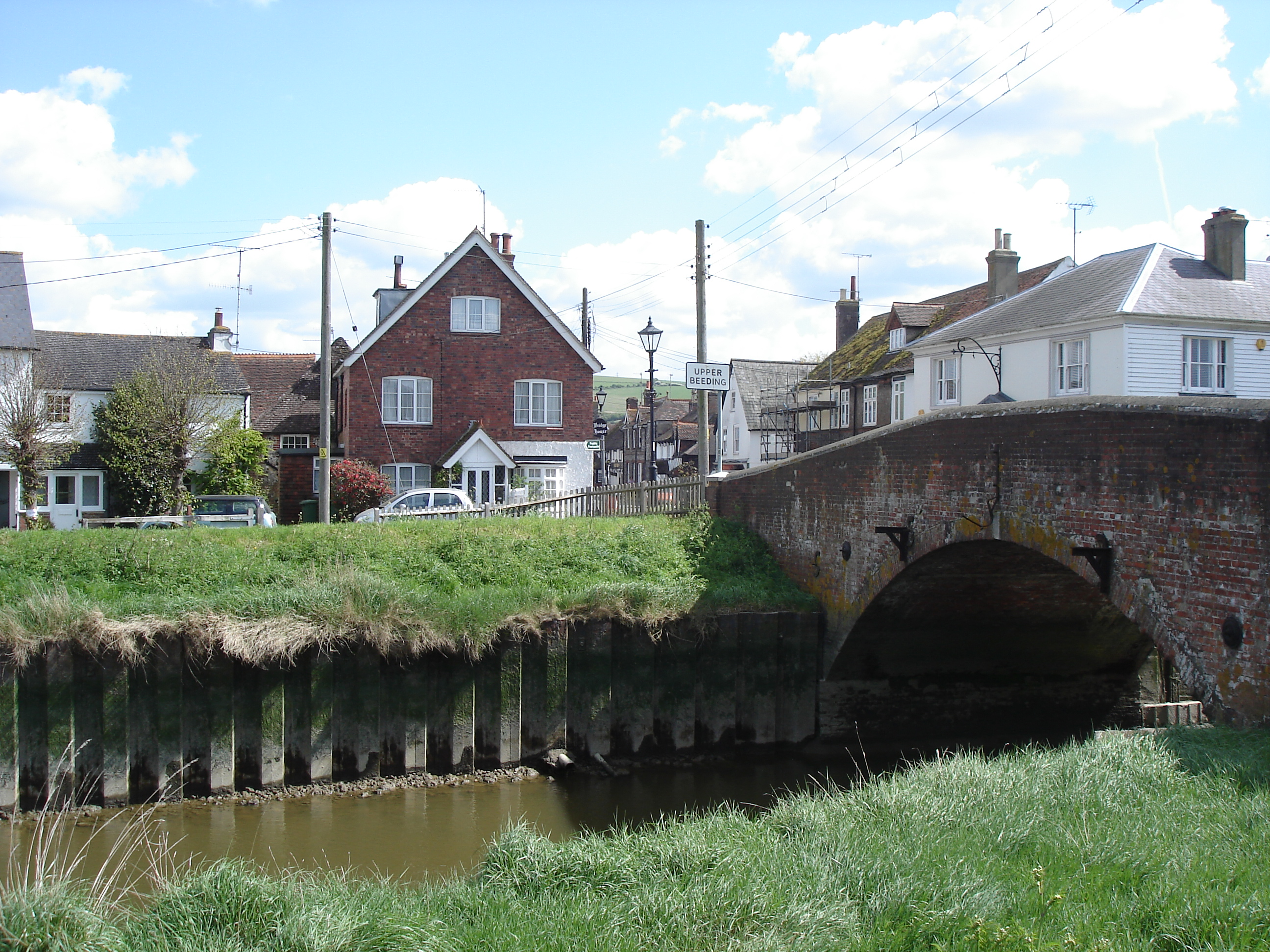
- Beeding Bridge

- Location within West Sussex
- Area: 18.77 km^{2} (7.25 sq mi)
- Population: 3,798 2001 Census; 3,763 (Census 2011)
  - Density: 202/km^{2} (520/sq mi)
- OS grid reference: TQ193105
  - London: 43 miles (69 km) N
- Civil parish: Upper Beeding
- District: Horsham
- Shire county: West Sussex
- Region: South East
- Country: England
- Sovereign state: United Kingdom
- Post town: STEYNING
- Postcode district: BN44
- Dialling code: 01903
- Police: Sussex
- Fire: West Sussex
- Ambulance: South East Coast
- UK Parliament: Arundel and South Downs
- Website: Upper Beeding Parish Council

Upper Beeding is a village and civil parish in the Horsham District of West Sussex, England. It is located at the northern end of the River Adur gap in the South Downs, four miles (6.4 km) north of Shoreham-by-Sea and has a land area of 1,877 hectares (4,640 acres). The site is a bridging point over the river: on the opposite bank are Bramber and Steyning, making the whole area somewhat built-up. The civil parish also includes the smaller village of Small Dole to the north (nearer to Henfield), and the village of Edburton to the northeast.

Upper Beeding is on the northern edge of the South Downs National Park which was created in 2010. The South Downs Way and Monarch's Way long-distance footpaths run through the parish; the area is popular with walkers, cyclists and equestrians. It is also at the western end of the Beeding Hill to Newtimber Hill Site of Special Scientific Interest.

== History ==
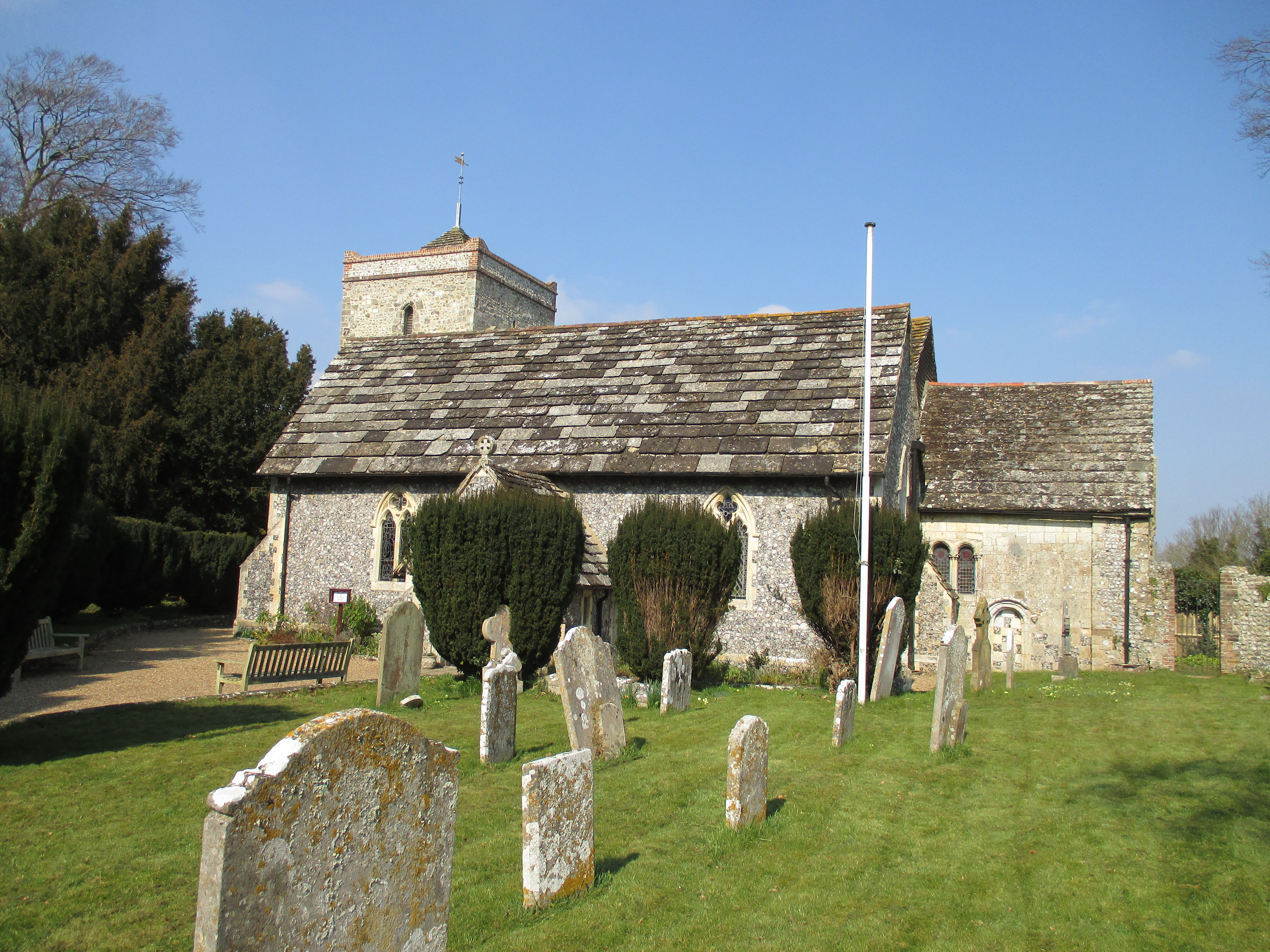
Church of St Peter (& Sele Priory Church)

The community was originally (and for the majority of its history) called Beeding, with the civil parish changing to Upper Beeding in modern times (date unknown). As is common in such cases, the ecclesiastical parish retains the original name (hence it is the parish of Beeding, and the parish church is Beeding Church). In the early 13th Century the monks of Sele Priory (St Peter's Church, Beeding) began a mission to the area of St Leonard's Forest near Horsham, and established a small mission base, naming it Lower Beeding. Despite being about 12 miles (19 km) away, Lower Beeding remained a part of (Upper) Beeding parish until Victorian times. The existence of Lower Beeding led to differentiation in the name of the original Beeding in some medieval sources, but always as River Beeding. For this reason the prefix Upper is still ignored by many local people today, who refer to their community by the original (and current ecclesiastical) title of Beeding.

In a times Beeding had a near neighbour, the hamlet of Sele. Today's village of Upper Beeding incorporates both communities, with the village centre located between the sites of the two original Saxon settlements. Saxon Beeding was closer to the Dacre Gardens area of modern Beeding, whilst Saxon Sele was nearer to the parish church (Sele Priory Church of St Peter) in modern Beeding.

In 1927 and 1929, land along the High Street was acquired for the building of a village hall to serve the community. Subsequently, funds were donated or raised for the building of the hall, which was completed in 1930. The hall contains meeting rooms where various organizations hold meetings and a number of different kinds of events. The Upper Beeding Parish Council meets monthly in the hall).

== Demographics ==
In 2001 census the parish of Upper Beeding had a population of 3,798 living in 1545 households, of whom 2001 were economically active. The population at the 2011 Census was 3,763.

== Notable buildings and areas ==
Notable areas in Upper Beeding

The parish of Upper Beeding includes three villages: Upper Beeding itself, Edburton and Small Dole. It includes a number of different soil types from Chalk downland, rich Lower Greensand to sticky Gault Clay. The parish covers areas with hills, downs, valleys, bottoms, brooks, and woods.

=== Upper Beeding ===
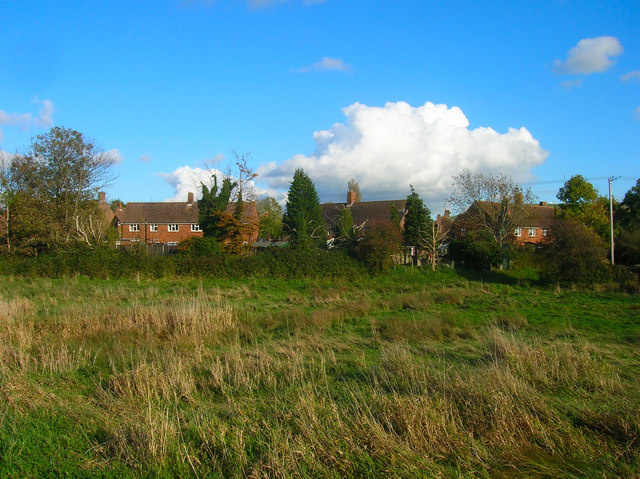
Saltings Field

Upper Beeding is a village on the eastern bank of the River Adur, opposite Bramber. It is just within the South Downs National Park boundary. There are two pubs in the village, the King's Head and the Rising Sun. The King's Head goes back to at least 1788 when Burbeach Hundred Court met there. There is a modern nunnery that it is not open to visitors. The southeast of the village is known as Castle Town.

The village has a rich history. In AD 858 it is thought that Aethelwulf, father of Alfred the Great, died here and was buried across the River Adur in Steyning. There was a priory in Upper Beeding during the 11th century, but no trace of it now remains. After the Norman Conquest, the manor was granted by William the Conqueror to William de Braose. De Braose rebuilt the Saxon church in 1073, giving us the present St Peter's church.

During the medieval period, a busy toll road ran through Upper Beeding, and the toll house was one of the last such houses to be in service in the country. It was later dismantled and re-erected as part of the Weald and Downland Open Air Museum.

At nearby Saltings Field is a scheduled monument where you can see remains of salt-making industry begun in the 13th century.

==== Beeding and Horton brooks ====
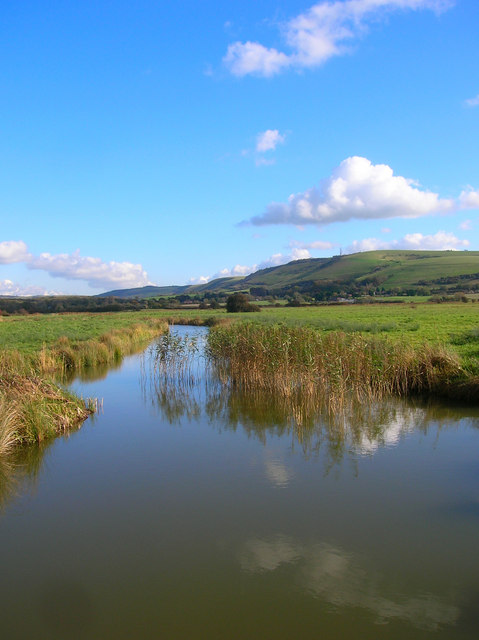
Drain, Beeding Brooks

Beeding brooks (TQ 191 112) and Horton brooks (TQ 200 116) are ancient waterside landscapes in the northwest of the parish. They surround the River Adur and have preserved the ancient indentations of the salting channels. In winter, the fossil salt marsh channels are flooded and this is when nature is at its best here. Many birds from Siberia pass the colder months here. The area can support owls, snipe, winter thrushes, and winter ducks. The best brook channels still host some important marsh species including ivy-leaved duckweed, water horsetail, water crowfoot and brooklime. There are also many species of water snail including moss bladder snail and great ramshorn snail. To the east of Horton is Horton Clay Pit, an important archeological site with many fossils in the Gault Clay.

There are brooks, horse paddocks, and buildings encroaching the area. Plants such as algae and reeds can be found inside of the ditches, while some are too shallow.

Located behind Horton Clay Pit, about 40% of Horton Wood (TQ 207 125) still survives. It is a maple, oak and hazel woodland with crab apple, midland thorn, hawthorn, bluebells, goldilocks buttercup, anemones, early purple orchids.

==== Beeding Hill ====
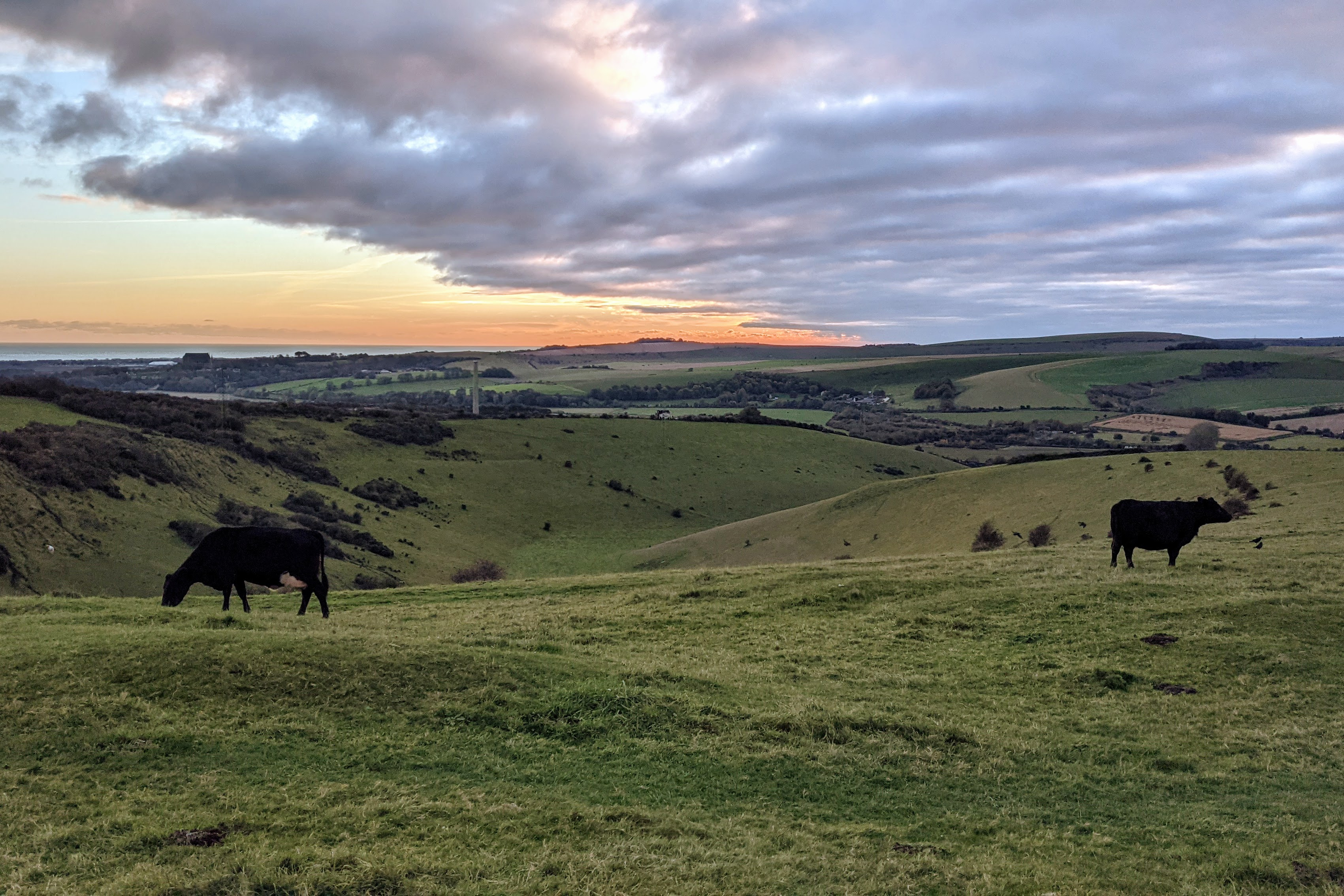
View from Beeding Hill over Anchor Bottom towards Lancing

The Hill used to be called Beeding Tenantry Down and was common land until after the Second World War. There was a cricket ground in the Prince Regent's time on the southern side of the Monarch's Way (TQ 210 095) as it tracks east from the Beeding Hill car park.

All along the crest of Beeding Hill, just south of the road up to the Truleigh Hill Youth Hostel, was an important cluster of Bronze Age burial mounds. After the war the Hill was both leased out to tenant farmers on 999 year leases and given to the National Trust for token ownership. It was a mixture of generosity and foolishness. Over the next few years these farmers bulldozed and ploughed all of these ancient pastures and their archaeology and wildlife were lost. After decades of intensive farming the land was returned to permanent pasture in the 1990s but no freedom to roam was given on these wide acres. Tiny fragments of Down pasture exist on the eastern slope of Beeding Hill and there are still harebells, common blue butterflies and some bits of gorse and this area now forms part of the Beeding Hill to Newtimber Hill SSSI.

There are several trails leading up too Beeding Hill. There is a carpark at its top, though it is only accessible from Shoreham. There is a track from Castle Town, Upper Beeding called The Bostal which now forms part of the long distance Monarchs Way. There is another track that comes from Golding Barn which leaves Room Bottom to the right. This path has overhanging wayfaring tree and old man's beard (wild clematis). The bostal sides retain a good chalk grassland flora, with horseshoe vetch, orchids and harebell. The track passes the Beeding Hill Combe disused quarry/chalkpit (TQ 212 100) with species-rich scrub, short and long grass and bare ground (at the quarry). The ‘hills and holes’ of the grassed over quarry spoil tips are rich in flowers and insects. The slopes have abundant yellow cowslips in spring. In the autumn it is possible to find the waxcap. There are many butterflies, moths, mosses and lichen and the tony moss snail and scree snail.

Between the two tracks, north of the Beeding Hill car park, is Reservoir Corner, or Lynchet Triangle (TQ 207 098), which marks the ‘cultivation terraces’ attempts by medieval peasants to win further arable strips from increasingly unsuited ground, The whole of the valley floor between here and Castle Town, as well as Windmill Hill, was organised in the medieval strip cultivated open fields until the middle of the 19th century. Now this slope is winter grazed, so the grass is tall in summer. It can look unkempt around the entrance by Beeding Hill car park, but do not be deceived, it is a rich area and is part of the Beeding Hill SSSI. There is lots of yellow rattle and three orchid species, common heath and latticed heath moths and grizzled skipper butterfly as well as glowworms. The area downslope and to the west end of the site is poorer.

The Warren to the east of the Hill (TQ 218 094) was given its name in the early 1900s when the squire of Buckingham Place, Shoreham, attempted to turn the old Beeding Tenantry Down sheep common into a commercial rabbit warren. The attempt failed, but the place grew even more bramble, thorn and gorse thickets than it had before. Nightingales were also prevalent.

==== Anchor Bottom ====
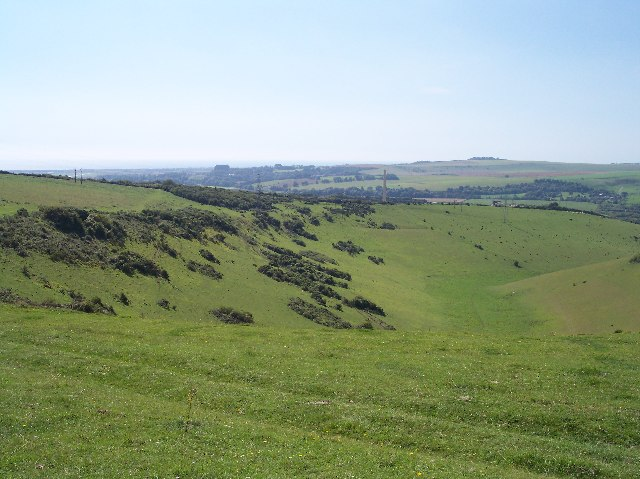
Anchor Bottom, near Beeding Hill

Anchor Bottom (TQ 205 092) runs down from the south of Beeding Hill carpark to the Dacre Gardens and River Adur. The valley was an early desmesne pasture of the lord of Beeding manor (based at Beeding Court Farm, which was called ‘Court’ Farm because the manorial court, or assembly, met there). For centuries it lay next to the Beeding Tenantry Down, from which it had been cut out. David Bangs, a local field naturalist, describe this valley as one of the best sites on the whole of the Brighton Downs. It is part of a Site of Special Scientific Interest and is well maintained by Old Erringham Farm. The soft valley sides are contoured with the terracettes made by the regular meanderings of the resident herd of cattle. In summer the slopes are colourful with scabious, knapweed, red clover, betony, Sussex rampion, Restharrow, pyramidal orchid, eggs and bacon, viper's bugloss and ox-eye daisy. The stripe-winged grasshopper is here, emergences of adonis blue are common on the steepest, shortest turf near the valley bottom and in autumn the autumn ladies tresses can be found here in numbers.

==== Shoreham Cement Works ====
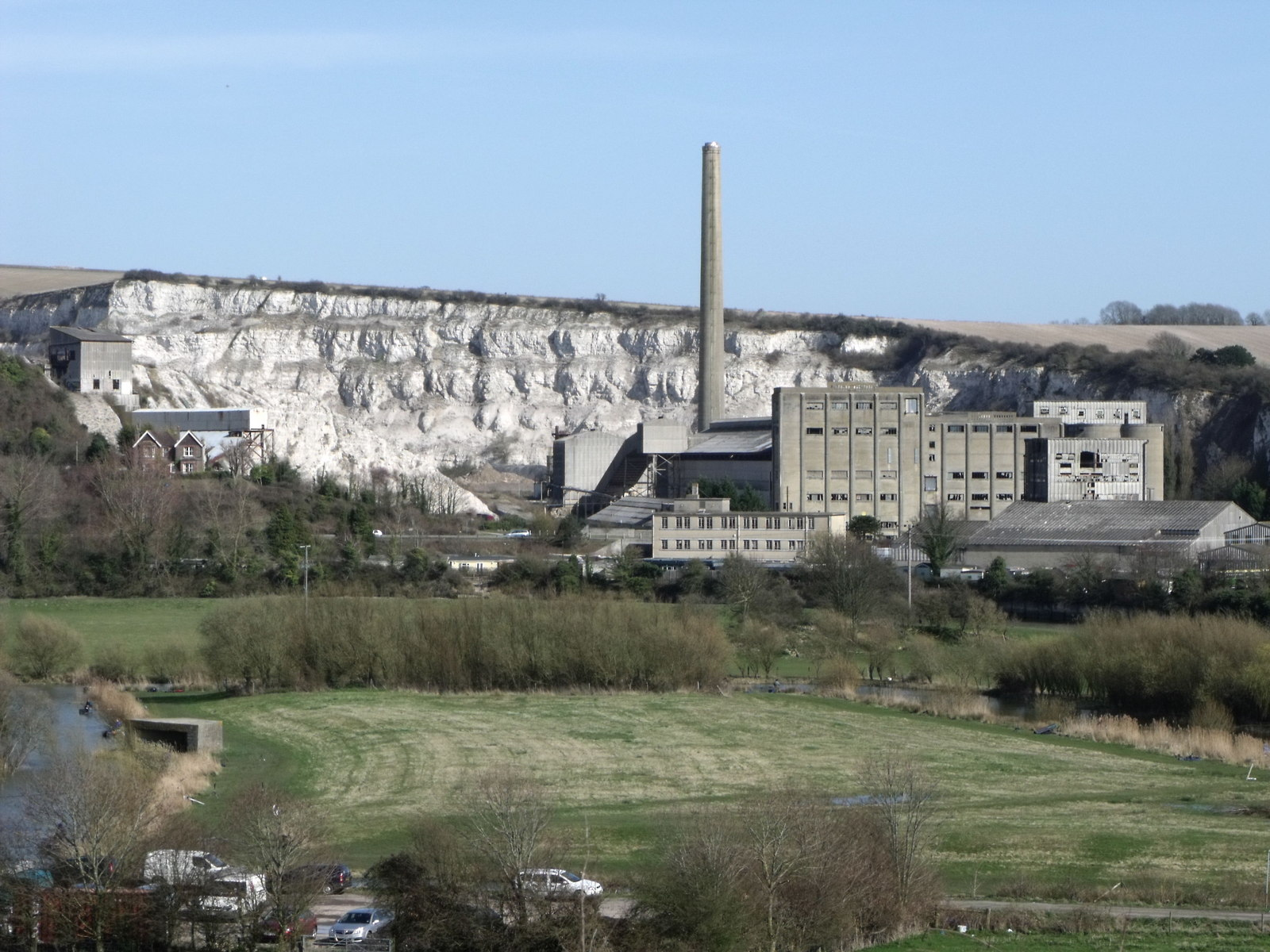
Upper Beeding Cement Works (disused)

Situated within the Beeding Chalk Pit, production at Shoreham Cement Works began more than 135 years ago in 1883. It was a major employer for the local area, providing hundreds of jobs to the residents of Shoreham and Upper Beeding until in 1991 the site shut its doors for the last time. The site has now been acquired by Dudman, an aggregates company and there is now regular activity onsite, but the building itself has been left unused ever since. The abandoned buildings remain there because the original owners had no obligation to demolish the buildings or return the landscape to its initial state.

=== Edburton ===
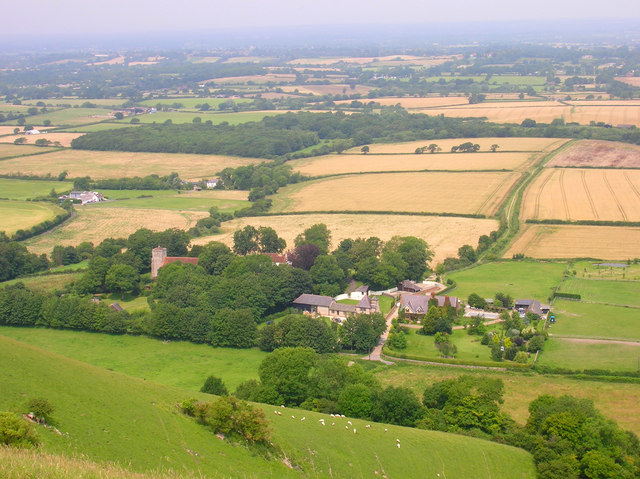
Edburton

Edburton is a small historical village to the west of the parish between Upper Beeding and Fulking. Its medieval church (TQ 232 114) is dedicated to St Andrew. To its south is a downland scarp that runs up to Edburton Hill. To its north is Edburton Sands.

==== Edburton Hill ====
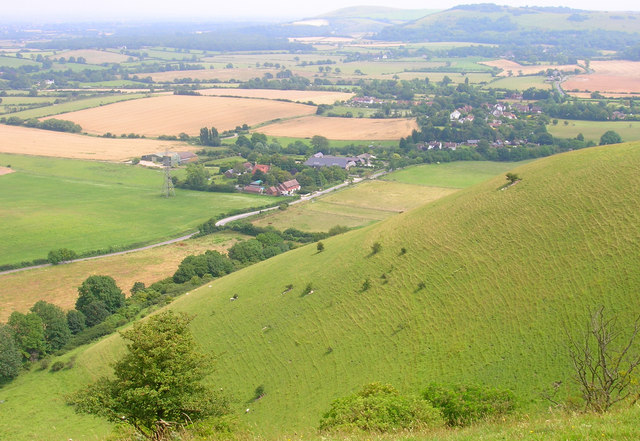
Escarpment, Edburton Hill

Part of the Beeding Hill to Newtimber Hill SSSI, Edburton Hill (TQ 237 110) still has evidence of the banks of a Motte and Bailey castle, built by the Norman overlord soon after the Conquest, probably on the site of much older earthworks. The castle cannot have been occupied for long and was of timber construction only. It's scarcely bigger than a farmyard. Later, in 1260, the Lord of Perching got a licence to build a fortified manor house down under the Hill, and you can still see crop marks where it used to stand. The banks of the Motte and Bailey have field fleawort, and one may find some patches of chalk milkwort which is much more sky-blue than common milkwort, and almost unknown to the west of Brighton.

There was a scatter of Bronze Age round barrows along this scarp top, but only one is now in good condition — on the South Downs Way just east of the cross roads in the dip between Truleigh and Edburton Hills. In spring the slopes are whitey-green with the new leaves of whitebeam, and there are many cowslips. Some years there are green hairsteak and brimstone butterflies. The east of the Hill is Fulking Hill in Fulking parish.

==== Truleigh Hill ====
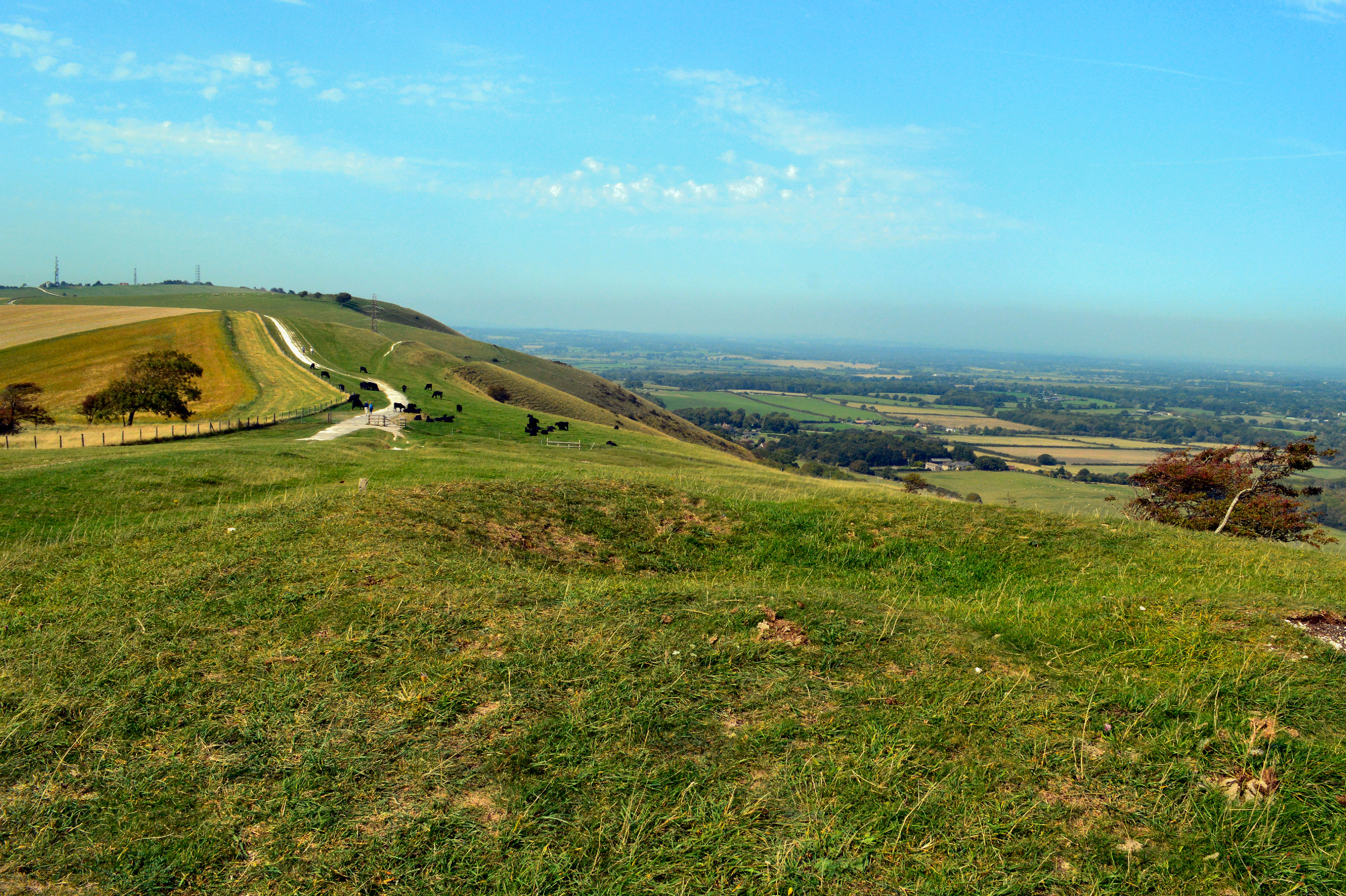
View towards Truleigh Hill

West of Edburton Hill is Truleigh Hill (TQ 224 110), which is known for the four masts on the Hill and their red lights, that can be seen across this landscape for miles. Around the Hill is Freshcombe Lodge, the Truleigh Hill Youth Hostel and a few bungalows, derelict sheds, scruffy tree plantings (which struggle to survive in thin, chalky soils) and barns, a modern house.

In the early 1950s, television broadcasts for the local area came from Truleigh Hill, until the Rowridge transmitting station opened. Local people wanted the booster transmitter to stay, as reception from Rowridge was not optimal. For decades the Society of Sussex Downsmen fought to prevent new radio masts being erected here. It was a dogged and ultimately successful battle. The views across the Downs to the west and south are spectacular. A deep narrow bostal track down the Hill to Truleigh Manor Farm.

=== Small Dole ===
Small Dole is a small new village to the north of the parish. It is surrounded by woods. To the north is the Henfield parish and Hoe Wood. To the east is Flacketts Wood (TQ 223 125) and to the southeast is Tottering Woods. Further east again of those are North and South Furze Fields (TQ 229 123) which have both have gathered many old woodland species in the two centuries since they were left to grow into woodland, including early purple orchid and then Edburton Sands.

To Small Dole's south is the Hillside Scout Campsite (TQ212 121). The south side of scout field still holds archaic meadow herbage, and in May there are still orchids, quaking grass, bugle, adders tongue fern, glaucous sedge, agrimony and knapweed with burnet companion moth, small heath and small copper butterflies flitting around them. To the southwest of Small Dole is Horton Clay Pit.

==== Hoe Wood ====
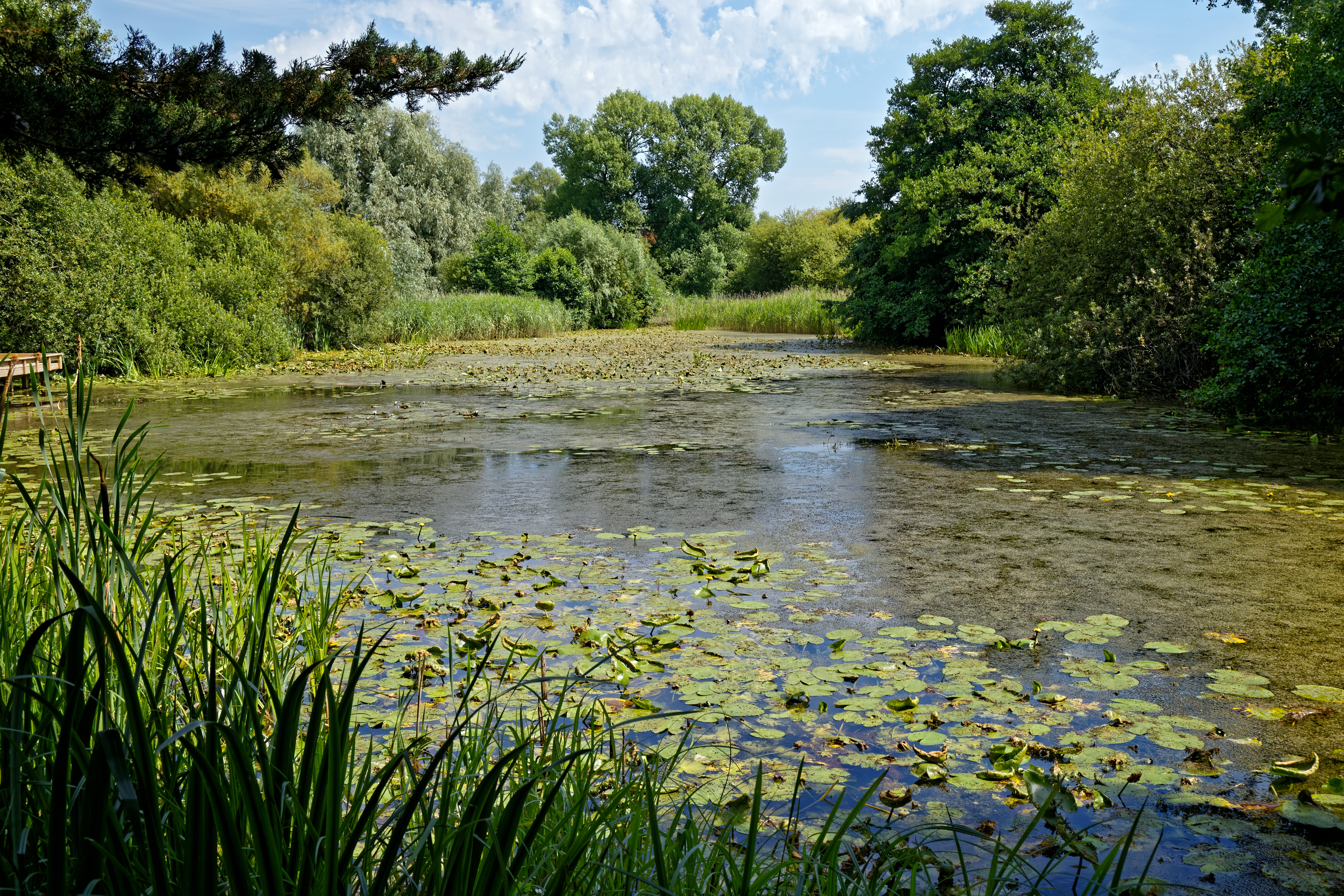
Woods Mill, Sussex Wildlife Trust

Hoe Wood is an ancient bluebell wood to the north of the parish and north of Small Dole. You may see barn owls, Long-tailed tit, kestrel and bullfinch here. In spring and summer, you may see whitethroat and reed warblers, increasingly rare though is the cuckoo, nightingales and turtle dove that were common here most summers until recently. About 40% of Hoe Wood was bulldozed for the Small Dole housing and the rest is private. The Sussex Wildlife Trust have their headquarters, Woods Mill (TQ 218 136), there and own slightly less than half of it. They have done much restoration work in the area and have an old water mill, mill pond, leat and flood meadows.

==== Horton Clay pit ====
The Horton Clay Pit (TQ 208 123) is a Site of Special Scientific Interest and it was once known to generations of young fossil hunters from Brighton, Worthing and beyond, with its fabled luminous phosphatic nodules, its ammonites and other special things so keenly collected. All is buried or scheduled to be buried now, heaped way above the old land height with municipal waste.

==== Tottington and Longlands Wood ====
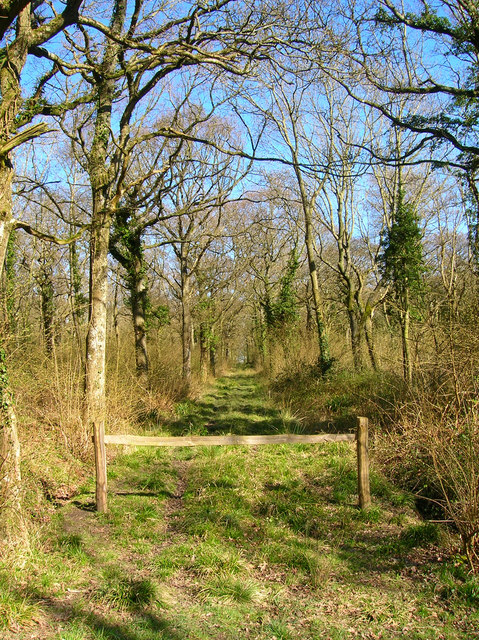
Track, Longlands Wood

Tottington and Longlands Wood (TQ217 122) sit next door to each other, separated from Hoe Wood by the Small Dole housing. They are sticky Gault clay woods with young hazel coppice under a uniform canopy of Oak maidens. They are rich in wildlife with as many as twenty three ancient woodland plants being counted here, including that classic of the Gault: thin spiked wood sedge. In spring they are full of warblers and bats including Noctule, Serotine, Brown Long Eared and Pipistrelle species and in the past cuckoo and nightingale were a common sound. There are silver-washed fritillary, cardinal beetles and longhorn moths and beetles. Local people have created a managed fragment of coppice wood, next to the industrial estate, which the public can freely walk and enjoy. It was designated Local nature reserve status in 1993. The rest of the woods, however, have been sold off in plots and lost their regime of regular coppice management.

==== Tottington Mount ====
Tottington Mount (TQ 218 110) rises up from Tottington Manor Farm to the north and Room Bottom to the west. From the top one can see the three medieval churches of Botolphs, Bramber and Steyning, and if it were not for its surrounding trees, you would be able to see Beeding church, too. All four of these churches marked early river landing points from the Adur. Botolphs and Beeding marked Saxon fords or early bridges. Bramber marked the Norman baronial causeway and bridge, and Steyning marked the busy Saxon Portus Cuthmanni. Below the Mount you can also see Golding Barn Raceway.

Neither the Mount nor Room Bottom form part of the Beeding Hill to Newtimber Hiil SSSI and most of Tottington Mount lost its ancient pastures, but the steep slope above the head of Room Bottom remains relatively unimpacted by human usage with a carpet of flowers. West and north west slopes of Tottington Mount (TQ 210 110) are lightly grazed by Sussex cattle and the Down pasture wildlife is returning. There is a large number of six-spot burnet moth and marbled white on the harebell and Sussex rampion. At the bottom of the north slope, opposite Tottington Manor Farm, is an old rew woodland with a very old rookery. Some years there are fly orchids with the nettle-leaved bellflower, primrose and bluebell which grow underneath the large old beeches and wych elm.

==== Room Bottom ====
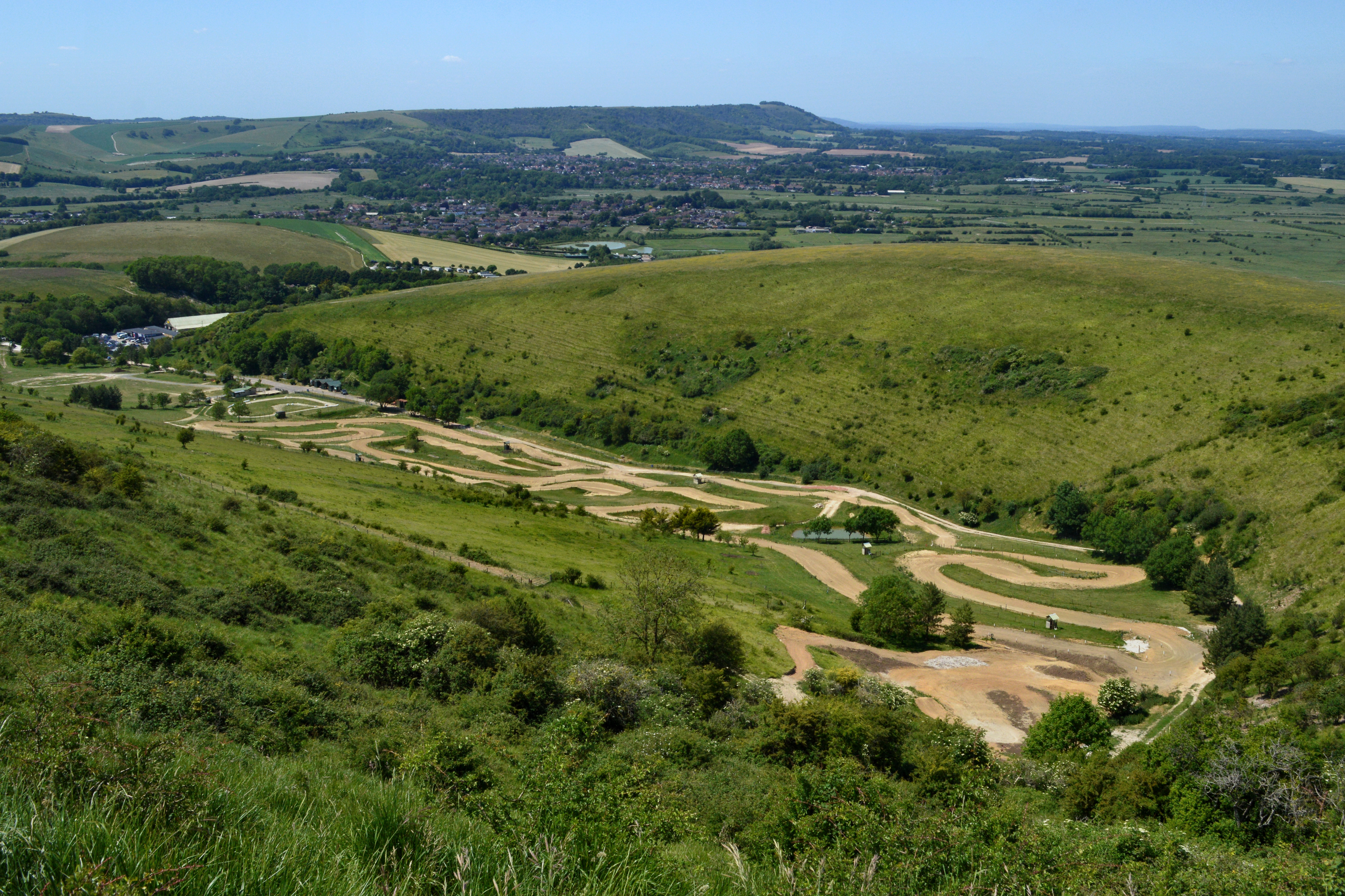
Golding Barn Raceway from Tottington Mount

Room Bottom runs west of Tottering Mount towards Golding Barn. Room Bottom (TQ 213 107) used to be Broom Bottom, but map makers left out the ‘B’ by mistake. It is a tranquil and remote valley, except when being used by the bikes on Golding Barn Raceway. The south side of the valley has a tussocky sward, with scattered scrub. The steep east end of the valley is derelict chalk grassland invaded by tor grass but does retain lots of rockrose and an associated webcap fungus, and the little black earth tongue. There are brown argus, adonis and chalkhill butterflies, Sussex rampion and ploughman's spikenard. The north side of the valley has a very dry, almost continental feel. It's also very steep, though the terracettes allow one to walk it.

=== Downland and scarp ===
The southeast end of the Upper Beeding parish is deep in the downs towards Southwick.

==== Bushy Bottom ====
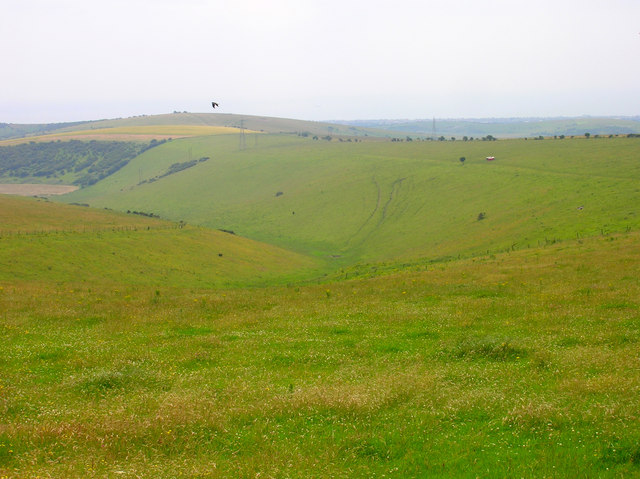
Descent into Bushy Bottom

Bushy Bottom (TQ 226 093) slopes down from Truleigh Hill to its north and the Warren to its west. It is a landscape in recovery. It was intensively farmed and cultivated for decades, though the east and west slopes of Bushy Bottom retained threadbare relics of their old heathy pastures. Now it's been back down as permanent pasture for nearly twenty years.

There are small heath and common blue butterflies and the big herds of cattle attract the rare hornet robberfly. The summer flowers here include harebell, dropwort and field woodrush.

==== Summers Deane ====
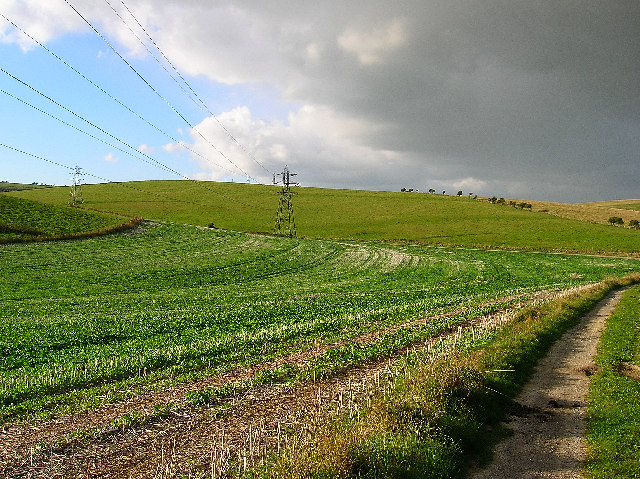
Summers Deane

There are two parts to Summers Deane, the Upper and the Lower. The Upper is just south of Truleigh Hill farm. Like Bushy Bottom its west slope (TQ 231 105) is still a site of recovery too being surrounded for decades by arable cultivation. It has a slightly less chalky soil chemistry, and has lesser stitchwort, sorrel, and gorse as well as more chalk-loving restharrow, quaking grass, bladder campion and thyme. The east slope (TQ 233 101) is small and has five orchid species, lots of colourful wild flowers and butterflies, interesting fungi and bushy bits for the birds.

This site lies just north of the spot where Summersdeane farmstead stood until the Canadian artillery flattened it during the Second World War. It was an old farmstead, going right back to the 13th century or before. In 1840 it was a daughter farm of Horton Farm to the north west, over the far side of Tottington Mount. The farmstead's grove of beech trees survives. That same fence line is an old manorial boundary, and further southwards, just over the hill crest, it crosses over two prehistoric round barrows. Boundaries were often marked by barrows on the Downs, and the same boundary is marked by a further (largely ploughed out) barrow (TQ 239 090) when it swings across to the top of Tenant Hill on the other side of Summers Deane. Upper Summersdeane's east slope (TQ 234 101) has the rare bastard toadflax, carline thistle and horseshoe vetch. Lurid Bolete is present, attracted by the rockrose which it mutually depends upon, and there is mosaic puffball, persistent waxcap and little bluey-black pinkgills.

The Lower Summers Deane's west slope is a scruffy, gorsey slope with red-purple betony, yellow rattle, rampion, ragwort, red clover and hairy violet. The neighbouring Freshcombe/Thundersbarrow slopes to the west are in the Southwick parish.
