= Astley Abbotts =

Village in Shropshire, England

Coordinates: 52.564°N 2.431°W

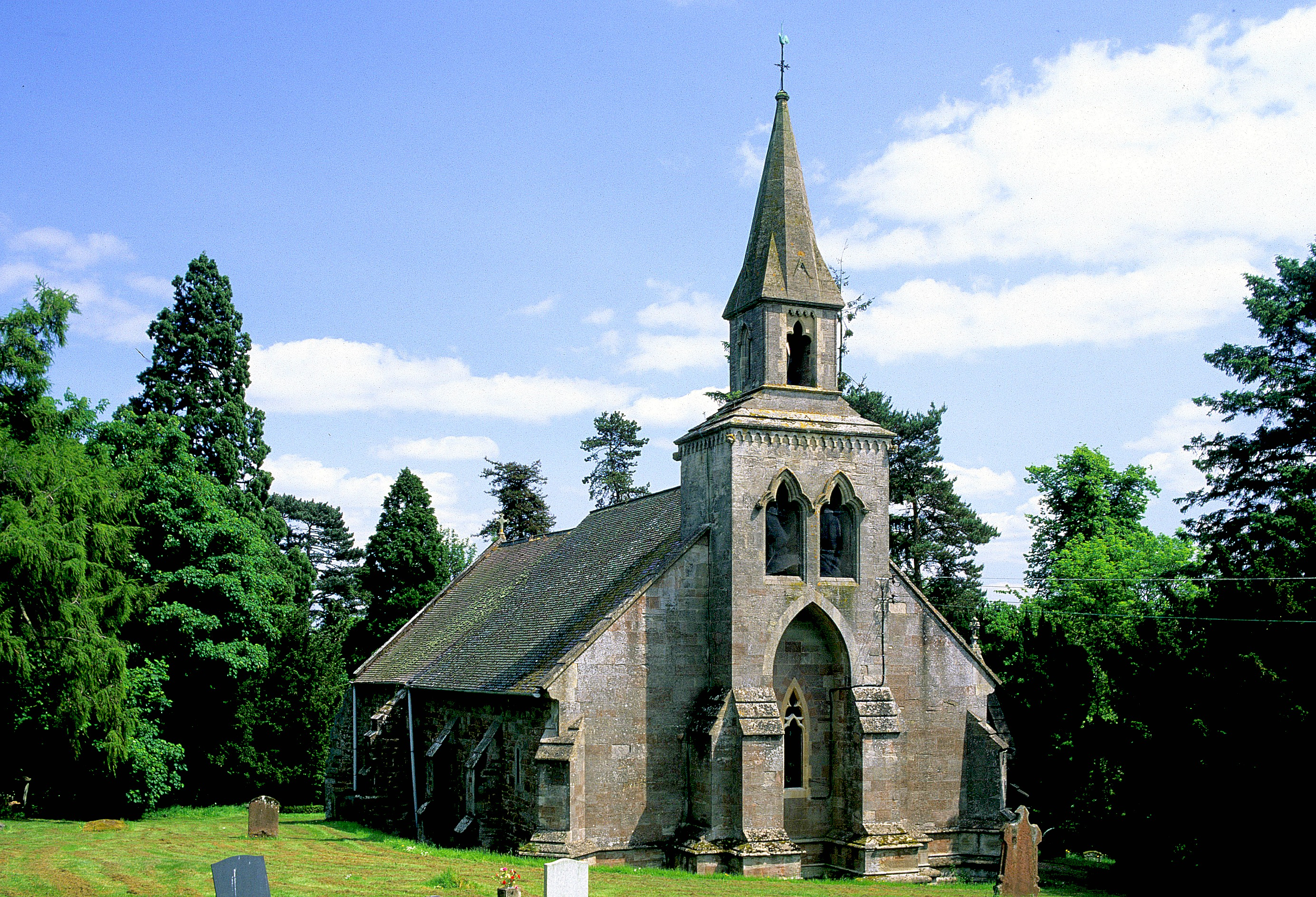
- St Calixtus's Church

- Location within Shropshire
- Population: 396
- OS grid reference: SO 71152 96327
- Civil parish: Astley Abbotts
- Unitary authority: Shropshire
- Ceremonial county: Shropshire
- Region: West Midlands
- Country: England
- Sovereign state: United Kingdom
- Post town: BRIDGNORTH
- Postcode district: WV16
- Dialling code: 01746
- Police: West Mercia
- Fire: Shropshire
- Ambulance: West Midlands
- UK Parliament: South Shropshire

Astley Abbotts is a village and civil parish in the postal district of Bridgnorth, Shropshire, England, located immediately north of Bridgnorth, and straddling the B4373 Bridgnorth to Broseley road. According to the 2001 census the parish had a population of 396.

The Church inside the village is known as St Calixtus' church, named after Saint Calixtus. The church is a stone building and has both Norman and Anglo Saxon roots. The church was originally constructed in 1138 and was later consecrated on 14 October 1138, by the Bishop of Hereford. Since then, the majority of the church has been rebuilt. However, the Church of England in Bridgnorth comment that there are still parts of the older church that still exist today. Inside the Church can be found the faded remains of a 'maiden's garland', a heart-shaped wooden frame decorated with gloves, cloth and ribbons. Such garlands were once the fashion to commemorate maidens who died before marriage. The one at Astley Abbotts has a ribbon-like piece of paper saying, in still legible handwriting, that it commemorates Hannah Phillips, who drowned while crossing the River Severn a day or two before her wedding.

Astley Abbotts was famous for its lavender fields in the centre of the village near the church, now abandoned, although some lavender still can be found. Nearby the village is located a mansion called Stanley Hall with both Stanley Hall and its grounds having links to early 17th century, Stanley Hall has a magnificent red brick building with a gabled end and incorporating traces of a possibly earlier sandstone building. The grounds, which open occasionally under the National Gardens Scheme, are extensive and well-tended.

== Institutional history of the parish ==
=== Changes within the boundary of Linley affecting Astley Abbotts ===
An early recognition of a change within the boundary of Astley Abbotts can be seen in the history of the parish of Linley. In 1639 it is believed that sometime Linley's parish boundary may have included some fields that were later in located Astley Abbotts. Along with this, owners of a nearby bridge named Preen's Eddy Bridge, built new 1 km section of straight road that ran through Astley Abbotts. Another lane also went through Astley Abbotts until it reached the Severn located in Astley Abbotts. Due to the river being the main outlet for trade, Astley Abbotts played a big part in Linley's industrial trade. As a result of this a railway was built from Linley to the wharf located in Astley Abbotts.

=== Changes within the boundary of Colemore Farm ===
A change within the boundary of Astley Abbotts can be found within Colemore Farm. Colemore Farmhouse is believed to be constructed around the early-mid 15th century as a medieval Manor House. Records show that in 1871, the farm consisted of 41 acres located in Astley Abbotts. In 1871, a purchase of land was made, increasing the size of the farm to 57 acres. This was known as The Frog Mill land and lay in Astley Abbotts. In 1887, the land increased again, resulting in the farm totaling to 61 acres. Another increase was seen in 1909, where more land was added, increasing the acreage on Astley Abbotts to 65. Colemore Farm grew to have a total of 136 acres, 68 acres in the nearby parish of Linley and 68 acres in Astley Abbotts. However, 1980 saw a cease in trading on Colemore Farm and as a result buildings fell into disrepair but in the 1990s it was restored and has become holiday accommodation.

=== Historical writings ===
Information from A Gazetteer of Shropshire from 1824, comments:

"ASTLEY ABBOTS, a parish in the Chelmarsh division of the hundred of Stottesdon, a curacy, in the diocese of Hereford, the deanery of Stottesdon, and archdeaconry of Salop (Shropshire)."

This information shows that in 1824, Astley Abbotts was a parish within a division named Chelmarsh and was part of the Hundred of Stottesdon. It also comments that Stottesdon was a curacy that was under the authority of the Bishop of Hereford, making Astley Abbotts part of this authority which was controlled by the Bishop of Hereford. It also suggests that, Astley Abbotts was controlled by Stottesdon, which was within the archdeaconry of Salop (Shropshire).

== Population ==
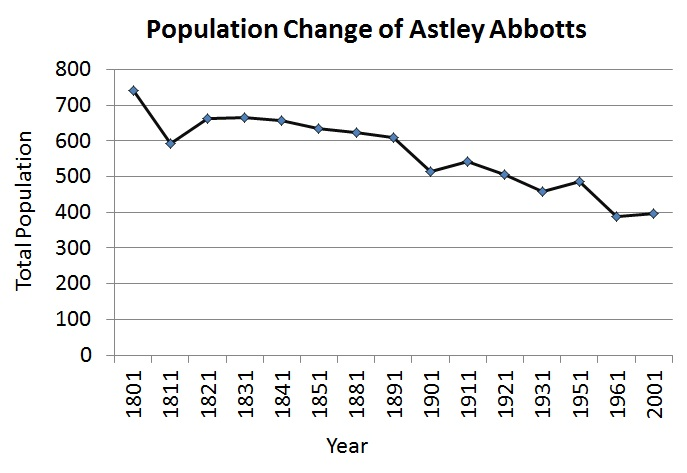
Population change. Created using data from the Vision of Britain Website and the Office for National Statistics website

From using census data from 1801 to 1961 found on the Vision of Britain Website and the 2001 census data found on the Office for National Statistics website, it can be seen that Astley Abbotts has had a decreasing population. This can be seen from the decrease of 148 individuals from 1801 to 1811. Astley Abbotts did also have an increase in population, between 1811 and 1831 when the population increased by 74 individuals. However, after 1831 the population continued to gradually decrease, until 1901, by 152 individuals. From 1901 to 1961 the population continued to decrease by 127 individuals creating a population of 387 individuals in 1961. However, from 1961 to 2001 there was a small increase of 9 individuals, creating a total population of 396 people.

== 1881 Occupational Structure ==
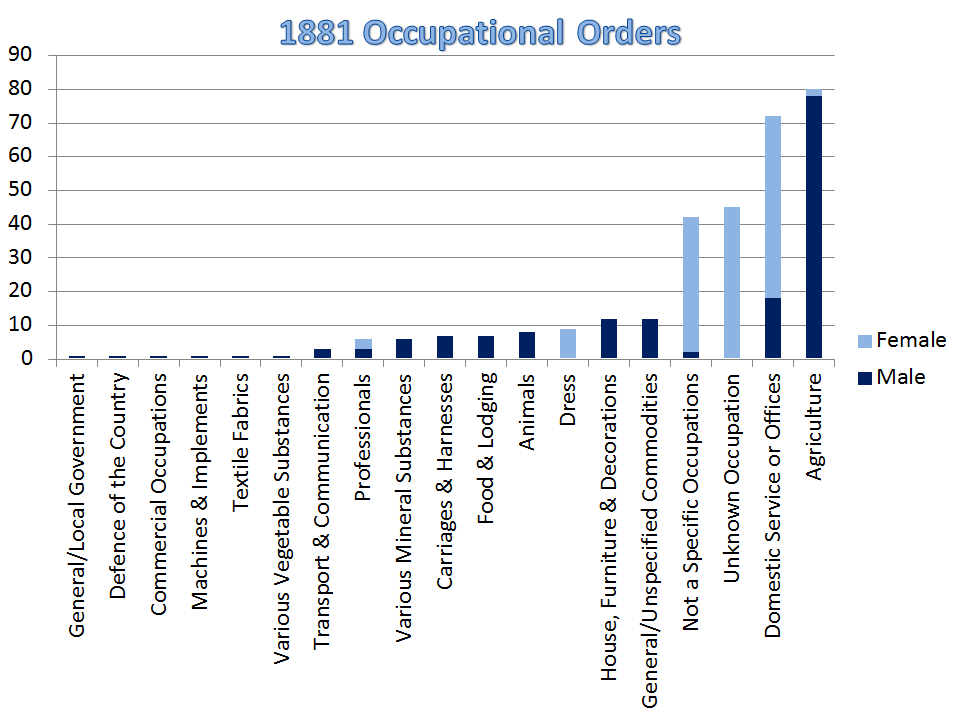
1881 occupational orders of Astley Abbotts. Created using information from the Vision of Britain website

From using the data found on the Vision of Britain website, the 24 'Orders' found on the published reports from 1881, suggest that of the 623 population, Astley Abbotts was dominated by two main occupations. With 78 were males and only 2 females working within Agriculture, this was the main occupation in Astley Abbotts and was dominated by the male population. The second most popular occupation was Domestic services or offices, with 54 females and 18 males; this occupation was dominated by the female population.

== People from Astley Abbotts ==
Sir Francis Billingsley (1595–1646) – Colonel in command of the royalist defences for the town of Bridgnorth during the English Civil War. Killed in St Leonard's churchyard on 31 March 1646 defending the town during the assault by Parliamentarian forces.

Sir Thomas Billingsley (1600–c.1670/80) – Noted horseman who was in the households of Richard Sackville, 3rd Earl of Dorset, Elizabeth of Bohemia, and the Earl and Countess of Thanet.

Sir Rupert Billingsley (1644–1713) – Godson of Prince Rupert, soldier and governor of Berwick upon Tweed at the time of the Glorious Revolution.

== See also ==
- Listed buildings in Astley Abbotts
