= Thomas Billingsley =

English horseman

Sir Thomas Billingsley (c. 1600 – c.1670/80) was a noted English horseman in the seventeenth century connected with the families of the Earls of Dorset, Thanet and Prince Rupert of the Rhine.

== Biography ==
He was born in Astley Abbotts, Shropshire, in about 1600 to Francis Billingsley and Bridget Vernon.(This Thomas Billingsley was baptised 6 April 1600 in Astley Abbots) Little is known of his childhood, but by the early 1620s he was in service with Richard Sackville, 3rd Earl of Dorset at Knole House in Kent.

=== Service with Earl of Dorset ===
According to John Aubrey, Billingsley taught Dorset and his retinue of 30 gentlemen to 'ride the Great Horse.' He was, according to Aubrey, 'the best horseman in England, and out of England no man exceeded him.'

Whilst in service with Dorset, Aubrey stated that Billingsley used to be asked to write down the sayings of Francis Bacon whilst at the table. Billingsley is mentioned in Anne Clifford's description of the household of her husband Dorset and according to her, used to sit at the Parlour Table. When Dorset died in 1624, Billingsley was left an annuity of £30.

=== Relationship with Prince Rupert ===
By the mid-1630s, Billingsley was with the household of Elizabeth of Bohemia in The Hague where he taught the Elector of the Palatine and his brothers. One related account that probably relates to this period was that once Prince Rupert was out hunting when his dog disappeared down a hole after a fox. The Prince dived in after his dog but became stuck and Thomas Billingsley had to pull the Prince out by his ankles.

It is not known what happened to Billingsley during the English Civil War. Prince Rupert though developed close connections with members of Billingsley's family. In 1644 the Prince became godfather to Rupert Billingsley, Thomas's great-nephew. Another, unidentified, member of the family was probably the 'Captain Billingsley' who accompanied Rupert on his naval adventures in 1648. This Billingsley however went down with the Constant Reformation in 1652 as one of two men Rupert tried to save but instead chose 'rather to die among their soldiers than save themselves.'

Despite his close connections to the Prince, during the period of the Commonwealth Billingsley was appointed to the post of Gentleman of the Bedchamber in 1655. He was present at the marriage of Oliver Cromwell's daughter Frances Cromwell to Robert Rich on 11 November 1657. An account of the wedding ceremony describes Billingsley as 'an old formal courtier' who had recently shaved his beard off to adhere to the latest courtly fashions. He was the butt of jokers however as when demonstrating one of the formal dances, some men 'made the knights lip black like a beard' at which Billingsley drew his knife and only narrowly avoided killing one.

=== Service with the Tufton Family ===
After the Restoration (1660) Billingsley appears to have been in favour with the family of John Tufton, 2nd Earl of Thanet. Tufton had married the daughter of Billingsley's earlier patron, Richard Sackville. In 1665 Sackville's widow, Anne Clifford, noted that Billingsley acted as the tutor for Sackville and George Tufton as they travelled to Paris and Germany. On this trip they visited the Elector of the Palatine, in whose service the 16-year-old George Tufton was wounded in a skirmish; an injury which was to slowly kill him over the next four years.

Likewise, Billingsley's great-niece, Bridget Billingsley was noted by Anne Clifford as in service with another of her granddaughters.

The date of Billingsley's death is unknown, but according to John Aubrey he died in the 1670s whilst praying on his knees at the house of the Countess of Thanet.
