= Ashcombe House =

Ashcombe House or Ashcombe Park may refer to several places in England:

- Ashcombe House, East Sussex
- Ashcombe House, Somerset, formerly occupied by Peter Gabriel
- Ashcombe House, Wiltshire, occupied by Guy Ritchie, and previously by Sir Cecil Beaton, and Madonna
- Ashcombe Park, Staffordshire, country house and estate in Staffordshire
- Ashcombe Park, district and public park in Weston-super-Mare, Somerset
