= Ashcombe House, East Sussex =

Country house in St Ann Without, East Sussex, England

Coordinates: 50°52′8″N 0°1′45″W

Ashcombe House is a country house in St Ann Without, Lewes District in East Sussex. It is a Grade II* listed building.

The L-shaped two-storey house with "grey headers with dressings, quoins and [a] modillion cornice of red brick" dates to the 18th century, when it served as a farmhouse. It was acquired by the University of Sussex in 1963 and was as its Vice-Chancellor's official residence until 1981. It is now owned by the Woodburn family who until June 2024 were antique dealers specialising in rare and precious clocks.
