= Listed buildings in Astley Abbotts =

Astley Abbotts is a civil parish in Shropshire, England. It contains 22 listed buildings that are recorded in the National Heritage List for England. Of these, three are listed at Grade II*, the middle grade of the three grades, and the others are at Grade II, the lowest grade. The parish contains the small village of Astley Abbotts and is otherwise rural. Apart from a church, all the listed buildings are houses and associated structures, farm houses and farm buildings, most of them in the countryside around the village.

== Key ==
Grade	Criteria
II*	Particularly important buildings of more than special interest
II	Buildings of national importance and special interest

== Buildings ==
Name and location	Photograph	Date	Notes	Grade
St Calixtus' Church; 52.56315°N 2.43132°W		12th century	The chancel was rebuilt in 1622, between 1856 and 1858 the south wall of the nave was rebuilt, and the south porch and the west turret were added, and in 1859 restoration was carried out by Arthur Blomfield. The church is built in sandstone with some limestone dressings, and it has a tiled roof with crested ridge tilde on the porch. It consists of a nave, a south porch, a chancel, and a west turret. The nave is Norman, and the chancel is Gothic. At the west end are buttresses surrounding a small west window, and above are two stages forming the bell turret, which is surmounted by a broach spirelet with a weathervane.	II*
Binnal; 52.56871°N 2.44147°W	—	15th century	The exterior of the house dates from the 19th century, and is in stone and brick with a tiled roof. There are two storeys, a front of two bays, and casement windows. Inside is a 15th-century hall with wall paintings. There is a later wing at the rear.	II*
Hoards Park Farmhouse; 52.54890°N 2.42162°W	—	Early to mid 16th century	A timber framed farmhouse that was encased in brick and extended in the 17th century, and further extended and altered in 1875. The roof is tiled and has coped gables with shaped and pierced bargeboards. There are two storeys with an attic, and a four-bay front, the outer bays projecting and gabled. The windows are mullioned, those in the ground floor also having transoms. On the front is an open porch.	II
Stables and Covered Cartway, Hoards Park Farm; 52.54920°N 2.42250°W	—	16th century	The structure is to the west-northwest of the farmhouse. It was altered in the 17th century and extended in the 18th century. Part of it is timber framed with brick infill on a brick plinth, and the later wing is in brick with some sandstone and a dentil eaves cornice. The building has a T-shaped plan, two storeys and a tiled roof, with the cartway running through the centre.	II
Dunval; 52.56136°N 2.44283°W	—	Elizabethan	A timber framed farmhouse in late Elizabethan or early Jacobean style. It has a U-shaped plan, with a main range and projecting gabled cross-wings. The upper floor and the gables are jettied, and the windows are mullioned and transomed with four lights.	II*
Barns, Manor Farm; 52.56359°N 2.43311°W	—	Early 17th century (probable)	The barns are to the southwest of the farmhouse. They are partly timber framed and partly in brick, and have tiled roofs.	II
Stanley Hall; 52.56054°N 2.41788°W	—	Early 17th century (probable)	A house that is partly timber framed. partly in brick, and partly in stone, and has tiled roofs. It has an L-shaped plan, and two storeys with attics. The windows are mullioned or mullioned and transomed and contain casements. At the angle of the wings is a wood cupola.	II
Stocking Farmhouse; 52.57190°N 2.47147°W	—	Early 17th century	The farmhouse is timber framed, and was partly encased in brick and extended in the 19th century. It has corbelled eaves and a tile roof. There are two storeys and an attic, a symmetrical front of three bays, and at the rear is an outshut and a single-storey wing. The windows are mullioned and transomed. On the front is a central doorway and a porch with cast iron posts.	II
Barn, Binnal; 52.56844°N 2.44181°W	—	17th century (probable)	The barn is to the south of the house, It is in stone, with repairs in brick, and has a tiled roof. The barn contains ventilation holes in patterns.	II
Colemore Farm House; 52.57526°N 2.43616°W	—	17th century	The farmhouse is partly timber framed and partly in brick on a stone plinth and has a tiled roof. There are two storeys, two bays, and the windows are casements.	II
Barn, Colemore Farm; 52.57542°N 2.43648°W	—	17th century (probable)	The barn is to the northwest of the farmhouse. It is partly timber framed and partly in brick on a stone plinth, and has a tiled roof. The barn contains a large cart entrance.	II
Range of farm buildings, Hoards Park Farm; 52.54964°N 2.42207°W	—	17th century	The farm buildings were extended during the following two centuries. They form two ranges at right angles, giving a T-shaped plan. The buildings are mainly timber framed, some on a sandstone plinth, either with brick infill or weatherboarded, and parts are in brick. The roofs are tiled. The buildings contain cart entrances and various doorways.	II
Home Farm House; 52.56119°N 2.43057°W		17th century	The farmhouse is timber framed with brick infill and a tiled roof. There is one storey with attics, and three bays. The windows are casements, in gabled dormers in the attic, and all have lattice glazing.	II
Barn, Rhodes Farm; 52.56353°N 2.46193°W	—	17th century (probable)	The barn is to the northeast of the farmhouse, and is timber framed with a tiled roof. A later annexe is in brick.	II
Severn Hall; 52.56454°N 2.41107°W		17th century	The farmhouse is partly timber framed and partly in brick. It has an irregular plan, tiled roofs, two storeys and an attic, and it contains casement windows.	II
Yew Tree Villa; 52.56197°N 2.43134°W		17th century	A timber framed house with some brick and a tiled roof. There are two storeys, and a later extension on the left. The windows are casements.	II
Garden walls (north), Hoards Park Farm; 52.54931°N 2.42122°W	—	Late 17th century	The walls surround the almost square garden to the north of the farmhouse. They are in brick with a stone coping, and are about 3.5 metres (11 ft) high. In the east wall are arched niches, probably bee boles, and on the west side is an arched doorway.	II
Garden walls (south and southwest), Hoards Park Farm; 52.54842°N 2.42266°W	—	Late 17th century	The walls surround a quadrilateral garden to the south and southwest of the farmhouse. They are in brick on a plinth, with pitched stone coping and a dog-tooth cornice. On the east side are two arched openings.	II
Rhodes Farm House; 52.56319°N 2.46229°W	—	Late 17th century (probable)	The farmhouse is in brick, and has a tiled roof with coped gables. There are two storeys with an attic, and three bays. The windows are casements.	II
Barn, St Mary's Cottage; 52.55371°N 2.43961°W	—	Late 17th or early 18th century	The barn is timber framed on a stone plinth. It has brick infill in the lower part and weatherboarding above, and the roof is tiled. There are three bays, opposing cart entrances, and a brick outshut.	II
Manor Farm House; 52.56368°N 2.43241°W	—	18th century	The farmhouse contains some earlier exposed timber framing. It is in brick with dentil eaves and a tiled roof. The doorway has pilasters, a traceried fanlight, and a pediment. The windows are modern; some are bow windows, others are casements.	II
Cartshed, Hoards Park Farm; 52.54921°N 2.42165°W	—	c. Mid 19th century	The cartshed and hayloft is to the north-northwest of the farmhouse. It is in brick with a corbelled eaves cornice and a tiled roof. There are two storeys and four bays. The ground floor has an arcaded open front with segmental arches, and in the upper storey are four round pitching eyes. In the south gable end, brick stairs with a balustrade lead up to a loft doorway, above which are ventilation holes in a diamond pattern. In the rear wall is a segmental-arched doorway, and at the north end is a single-storey cartshed.	II
