= Ayshcombe baronets =

Extinct baronetcy in the Baronetage of England

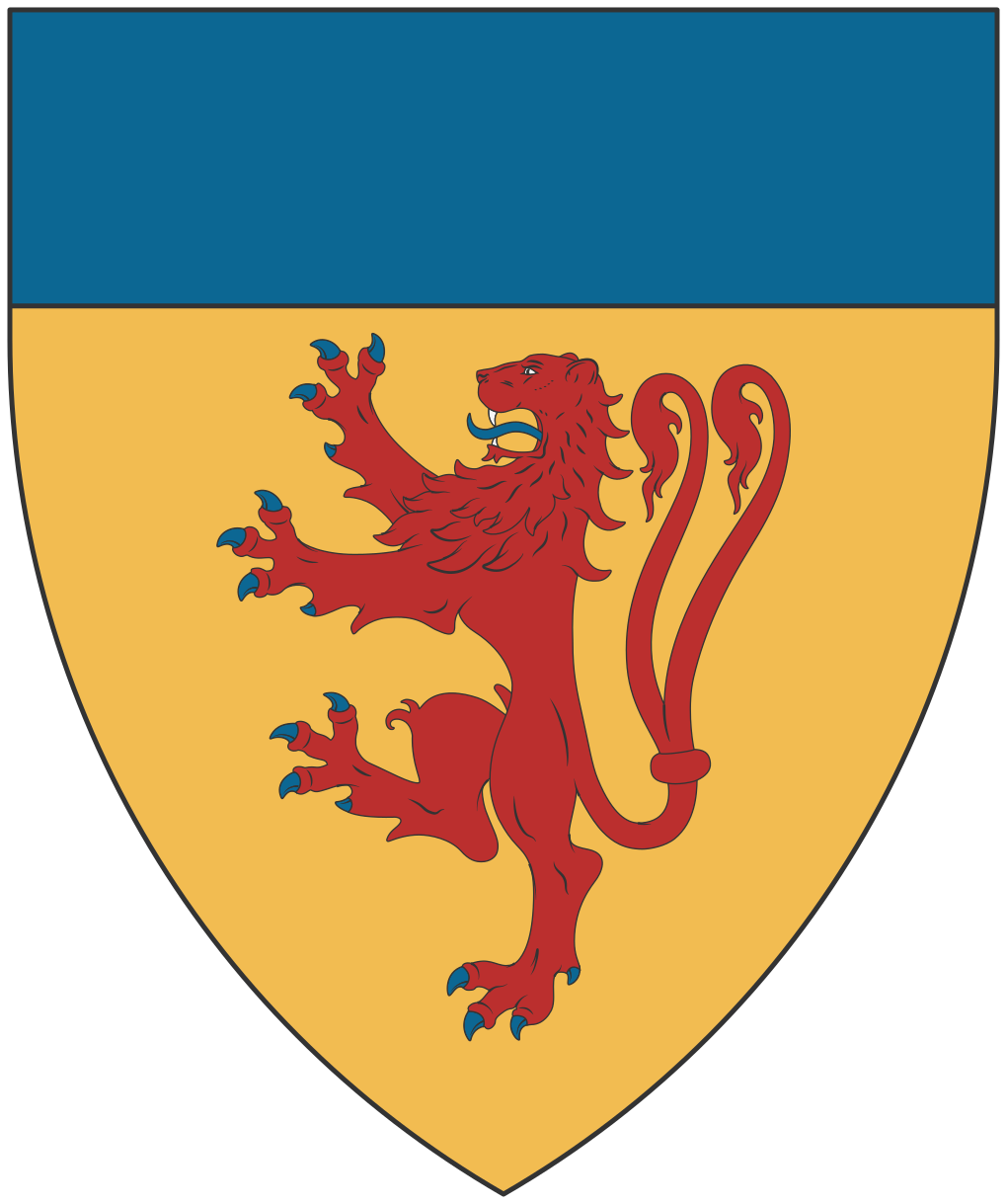
Arms of Ayshcombe of Lyford

The Ayshcombe Baronetcy, of Lyford in the County of Berkshire, was a title in the Baronetage of England. It was created on 28 May 1696 for Oliver Ayshcombe. The title became extinct on his death in circa 1727.

== Ayshcombe baronets, of Lyford (1696) ==
- Sir Oliver Ayshcombe, 1st Baronet (died c. 1727)
