= Ashcombe Volleyball Club =

Ashcombe Dorking
- Full name: Ashcombe Volleyball Club
- Founded: 1976
- Ground: The Ashcombe Volleyball Centre
- Capacity: 4 courts
- Chair: Zuzanna Resetarova
- League: Womens NVL Super 8 Womens NVL 3South

Ashcombe Volleyball Club is an English volleyball club established in 1976 at The Ashcombe School in Dorking, Surrey by former England volleyball captain and PE teacher Freda Bussey.

The club's first team competes in the National Volleyball League Super 8 division and is coached by Luke Thomas. The second team, composed mainly of junior players competes in Division 3 of the NVL and are coached by Matthew Neilson.
