= Upper Canterton =

Village in Hampshire, England

- Location within Hampshire
- OS grid reference: SU2612
- Shire county: Hampshire
- Region: South East
- Country: England
- Sovereign state: United Kingdom
- Police: Hampshire and Isle of Wight
- Fire: Hampshire and Isle of Wight
- Ambulance: South Central

Upper Canterton is a village in Hampshire, England, located at 50°54′36″N 1°37′24″W. It is near Minstead.
