= Listed buildings in Astley, Shropshire =

Astley is a civil parish in Shropshire, England. It contains eight listed buildings that are recorded in the National Heritage List for England. Of these, two are listed at Grade II*, the middle grade of the three grades, and the others are at Grade II, the lowest grade. The parish contains the village of Astley and the surrounding countryside. The listed buildings in the village are a church, a small country house and structures in its garden, two farmhouses and a private house. The only listed building outside the village is a milepost.

== Key ==
Grade	Criteria
II*	Particularly important buildings of more than special interest
II	Buildings of national importance and special interest

== Buildings ==
Name and location	Photograph	Date	Notes	Grade
St Mary's Church; 52.76493°N 2.69837°W		12th century	The church was partly rebuilt in the 15th or 16th century, the tower was added in 1837, and the church was restored in 1883. It is built in sandstone with a tiled roof, and consists of a nave and a chancel in one unit, a north vestry, and a west tower. The tower has three stages, diagonal buttresses, a west door, a clock face on the west front, an embattled parapet with chamfered coping, and a pyramidal cap with a weathervane. In the north wall of the nave is a re-set Norman doorway, and the east window contains Decorated tracery.	II*
Church House; 52.76453°N 2.69820°W	—	Early 19th century	A timber framed house that was partly re-faced in rendered brick and extended in brick in the 19th century. It has one storey with attics at the front, the rear wing has two storeys, and the roofs are slated. At the front is one bay, to the right is a gabled cross-wing, and to the rear are further wings. On the front is a gabled dormer, and in the cross-wing is a two-storey square bay window with a hipped roof.	II
Church Farmhouse; 52.76571°N 2.70085°W	—	Mid to late 18th century	The farmhouse, later a private house, was altered and extended in the 19th century. It is in red brick with a dentil eaves cornice and a tile roof. There are two storeys, a three-bay front, with a single-storey extension to the right and a two-storey parallel rear wing. The central doorway has a rectangular fanlight and a flat hood on shaped brackets flanked by sash windows. In the upper floor is a central Venetian window flanked by cross-windows.	II
The Firs Farmhouse; 52.76401°N 2.69785°W	—	Mid to late 18th century	The farmhouse is in red brick with dentilled eaves and a tile roof. There are two storey with an attic, a three-bay front, and a rear wing. In the centre is a doorway. The windows have segmental heads, three lights, and contain 20th-century casements.	II
Milepost; 52.76408°N 2.68033°W	—	Early 19th century	The milepost is on the east side of the A53 road. It is in cast iron and is about 600 millimetres (24 in) high. The milepost has a triangular plan, and two plates inscribed with the distances in miles to "SALOP" (Shrewsbury) and to "DRAYTON" (Market Drayton.	II
Walls and pavilion, Astley House; 52.76327°N 2.70171°W	—	Early 19th century	The walls surround the kitchen garden to the west of the house. They are in red brick with stone coping, they have a square plan, they are ramped up to the north and have globe finials. On the west side are gates with square gate piers, and on the north side is a wrought iron gateway. In the northeast corner is a small pavilion with a dentil eaves cornice and a pyramidal roof. The ground floor contains a doorway with a segmental head flanked by windows with round heads, and in the upper floor are casement windows.	II
Astley House and coach house 52.76327°N 2.70081°W	—	c. 1830	A small country house that is a remodelling of a Georgian house in Classical style. It is in rendered brick on a sandstone plinth, and has a tile roof. It has a T-shaped plan consisting of a three-storey main range and a two-storey rear wing. The house has a rusticated ground floor, a sill band, Corinthian pilasters in the upper floors, an entablature with a moulded dentil cornice, and a balustrade in the middle bay. On the front is a porch with two pairs of Doric columns and an entablature, and the windows are sashes. On the returns are pilasters, entablatures and pediments. On the left is a timber framed conservatory, and on the right is a two-storey three-bay coach house.	II*
Monument to King George IV, Astley House; 52.76304°N 2.70100°W	—	c. 1830	The monument to King George IV is in the garden to the south of the house. It is in sandstone, and consists of a pedestal with quatrefoils, a frieze and a cornice, a second stage with claw feet and crocketed arches, and a pierced top stage surmounted by a bust.	II
