= Mutual Climatic Range =

Mutual Climatic Range (MCR) is a method of determining the past climate at an archaeological site by examining the tolerances of a range of species found there. One method is to find the average temperatures in January and July by looking at the modern distribution of beetle species found on the site. Another application is to look at the tolerances of plant species to determine 'summer warmth and dryness' and 'wetness and winter warmth'.

The technique was developed in the 1980s, and a newer one first published in 2009 which looks at geographical distribution is also sometimes called "mutual climatic range".
