= Upper Hyde =

Hamlet and area of Shanklin on the Isle of Wight

Coordinates: 50.6309°N 1.1930°W

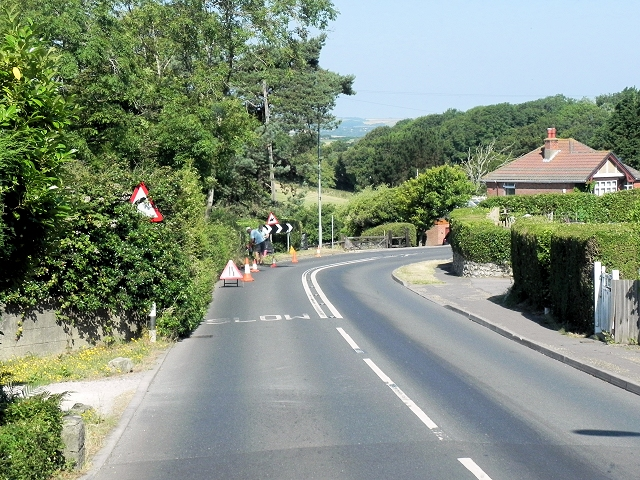

- Location within the Isle of Wight
- Civil parish: Shanklin
- Unitary authority: Isle of Wight
- Ceremonial county: Isle of Wight
- Region: South East
- Country: England
- Sovereign state: United Kingdom
- Police: Hampshire and Isle of Wight
- Fire: Hampshire and Isle of Wight
- Ambulance: Isle of Wight

Upper Hyde is a small village and area of Shanklin, on the Isle of Wight, England. It is located in the civil parish of Shanklin and the Central Shanklin ward, mainly on Upper Hyde Lane (unadopted name).

== Name ==
The name means 'the hide of land', from Old English hīd. A hide usually totalled about 120 acres, and 1 family.

~1280: Hyde

1289: la Hyde

1296: atte Hyde

1341: la Hide

1769: Upper and Lower Hide

Atte 'at the' was the surname of a person living there.

== History ==
In the Domesday Book, 3 landholdings named Scaldeford were recorded, totalling 1 hide. Reconstructed, this includes Upper and Lower Hyde farms (farms in the hamlet), Ninham Farm (in nearby Ninham) and the deserted site of Selbournes, with a total of 453 acres. It would have been part of an estate centred in Brading.

The division into Upper and Lower Hyde dates from the 18th century.

There are 3 Grade II listed buildings in the village.
