= Upper Breinton =

Coordinates: 52°03′36″N 2°46′54″W

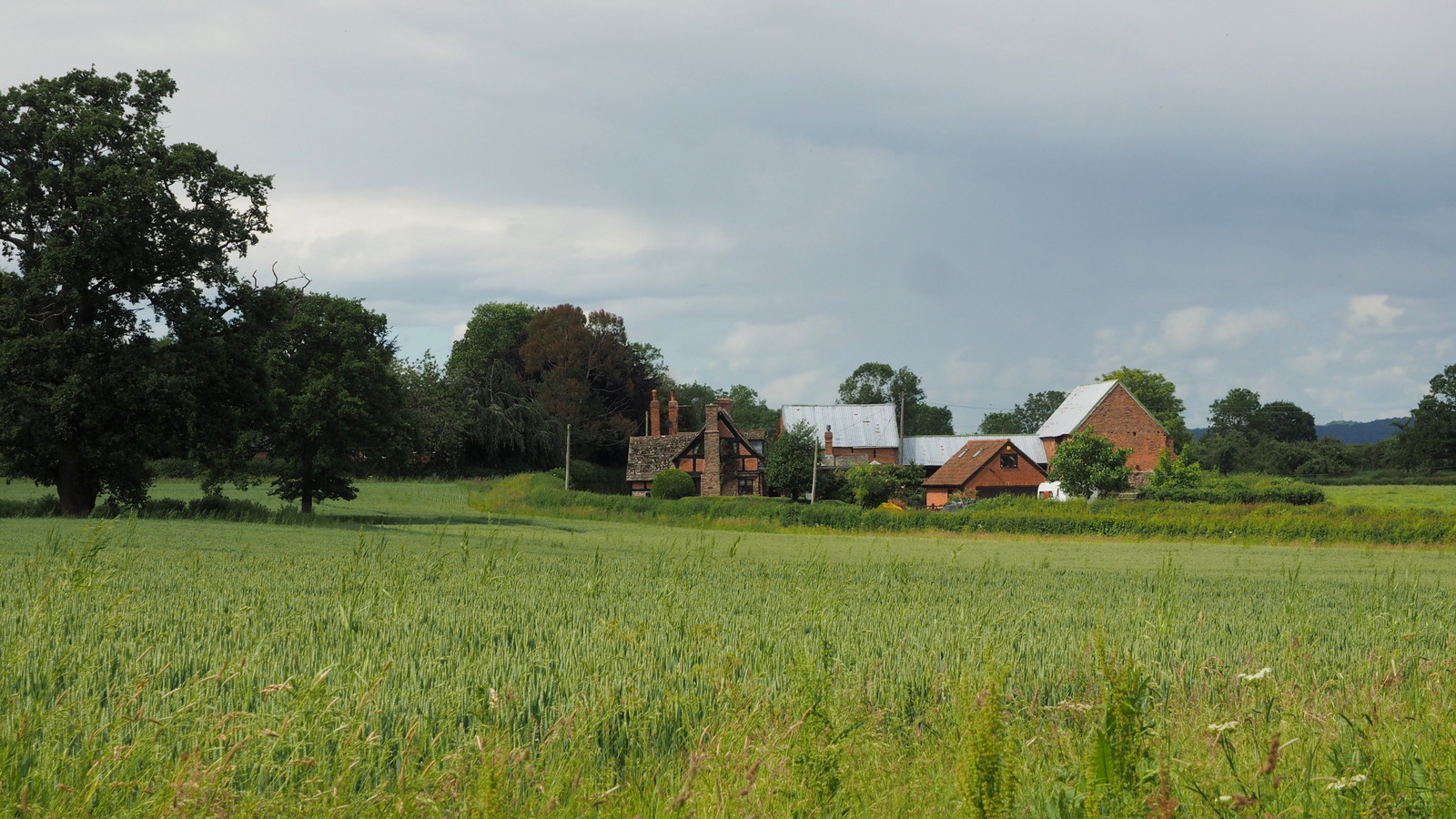
- Upper Breinton
- Unitary authority: Herefordshire
- Region: West Midlands
- Country: England
- Sovereign state: United Kingdom
- Dialling code: 01432

Upper Breinton is a village in Herefordshire, England. It is located in the civil parish of Breinton.
