= Small Dole =

Village in West Sussex, England

Coordinates: 50.90365°N 0.27403°W

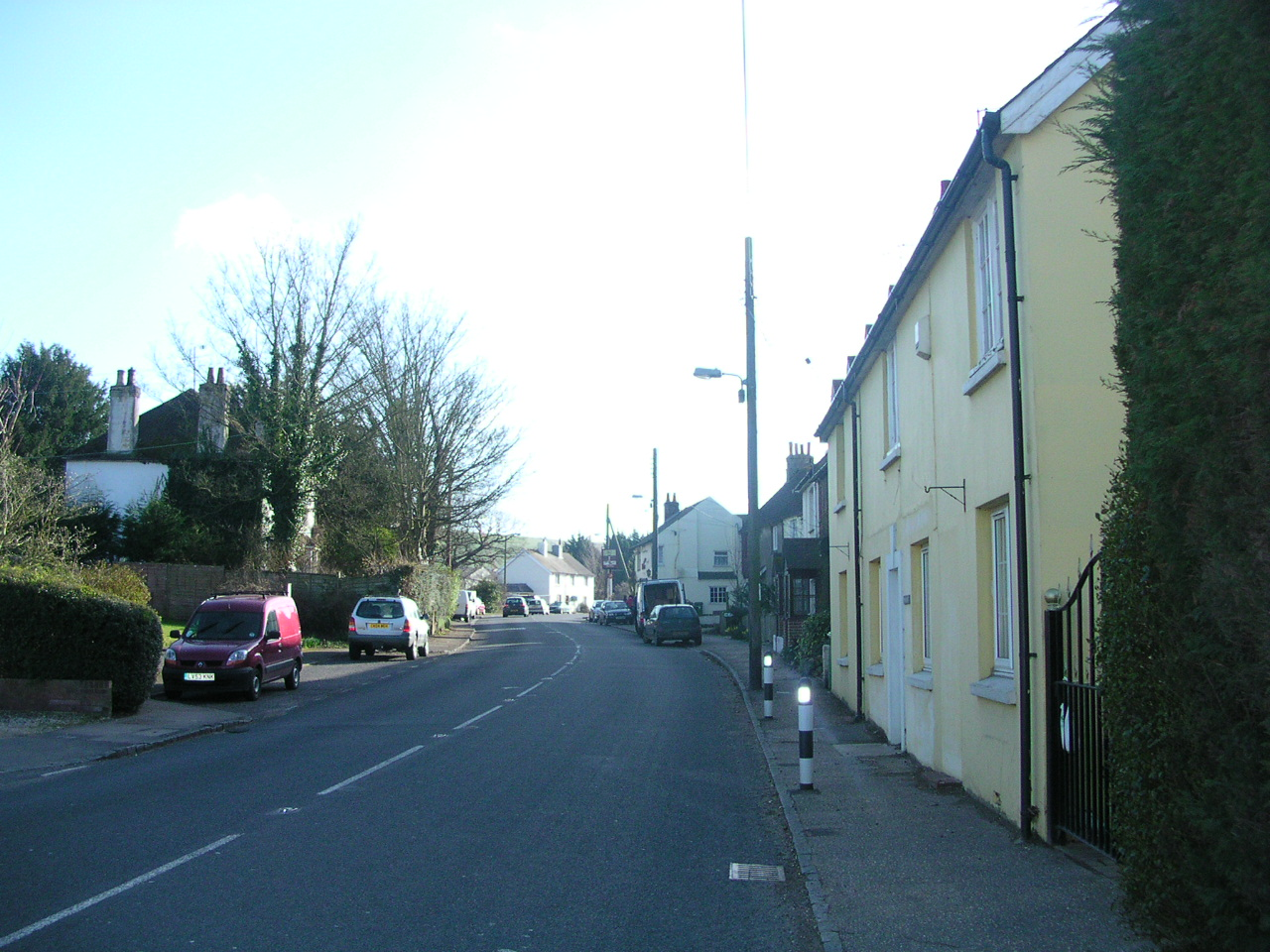

- Location within West Sussex
- OS grid reference: TQ214129
- Civil parish: Upper Beeding
- District: Horsham
- Shire county: West Sussex
- Region: South East
- Country: England
- Sovereign state: United Kingdom
- Post town: HENFIELD
- Postcode district: BN5
- Dialling code: 01273
- Police: Sussex
- Fire: West Sussex
- Ambulance: South East Coast
- UK Parliament: Arundel and South Downs

Small Dole is a village in the Horsham District of West Sussex, in England. It lies on the A2037 road two miles (3.2 km) south of Henfield.

In the late 1970s the Church of England altered its ecclesiastical parish boundaries, transferring Small Dole from the parish of Upper Beeding (where the population at the 2011 Census is included) to the parish of Henfield. The civil parish boundary continues to use the older ecclesiastical boundary. Thus Small Dole is part of the civil parish of Upper Beeding and the ecclesiastical parish of Henfield, adding to the local feeling of being torn between the two larger communities.

== Architecture ==
According to the Architects Journal, French architect Le Corbusier planned to build a house for his English friend Paul Bowlard in the village in 1936. The Planning Authorities did not want a modern house built in the village, and permission was refused.
