= Rupert Billingsley =

Rupert Billingsley (born 1644, date of death unknown) was an English soldier who secured the garrison and town of Berwick-upon-Tweed for William of Orange during the Glorious Revolution in 1688.

== Biography ==
Billingsley was born in 1644 in Astley Abbotts Shropshire, to Francis Billingsley and Elizabeth Latham. His father was a major in the Royalist Army supporting King Charles I. His godfather was Prince Rupert. Manorial records give a descent from Wyllym (de Byllyngsleye) appointed King's Clerk of Gloucester by King Edward I in 1306. (The first Billingsley to use the name of his birthplace as a Family name.)

A plaque on the wall of St Calixtus Astley Abbotts commemorates the family of Major Francis Billingsley the son of Colonel Francis - he was killed leading the Royalist Forces in the defence of Bridgnorth. A plaque on the wall of St Leonard's records that the Colonel was buried at St Calixtus. Eleanor the daughter of Edward Latham (also killed at Bridgnorth) married the Major having as family:- Sons were Francis, born 1640; Edward, born 1642 (- Col. will 11/567); Rupert, born 1644,(- Col. will 11/470); Lewis (Louis), born 1645 (Cap. will 11/468); Charles, born 1649 (?Knight of the Royal Oak). Their daughters were Margaret, born 1643 (Mort.); Bridget, born 1646; Eleanor, born 1650; Elizabeth, born 1653, and Dorothy, born 1655. The Register of St. Calixtus notes that at the baptism of Francis in 1640 three generations of Francis - Major, Colonel and Sir were present.
