= Astley, Shropshire =

Village in Shropshire, England

Coordinates: 52.765°N 2.699°W

Astley
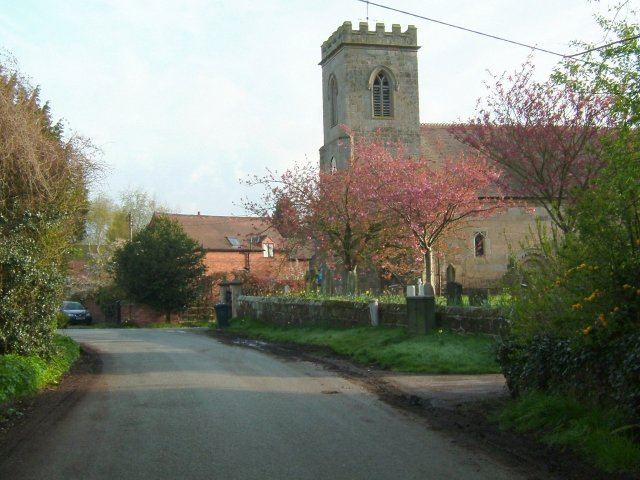
- Astley Church

- Location within Shropshire
- Population: 449 (2011)
- OS grid reference: SJ528188
- Civil parish: Astley
- Unitary authority: Shropshire
- Ceremonial county: Shropshire
- Region: West Midlands
- Country: England
- Sovereign state: United Kingdom
- Post town: SHREWSBURY
- Postcode district: SY4
- Dialling code: 01939
- Police: West Mercia
- Fire: Shropshire
- Ambulance: West Midlands
- UK Parliament: Shrewsbury and Atcham

Astley is a small village and civil parish in Shropshire, England. The official 2001 census recorded 454 people living in the parish and 116 in the village itself, falling slightly to 449 at the 2011 Census.

The village lies near to (and between) the A53 and A49 roads.

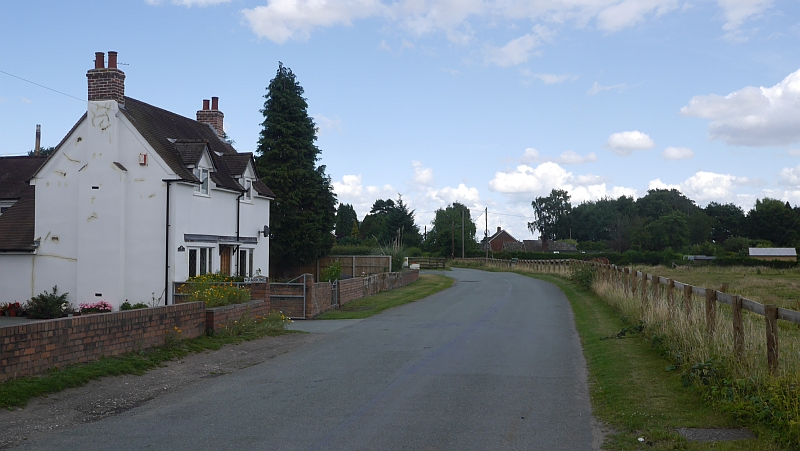
Bings Heath

Bings Heath is a small hamlet in Shropshire, England. It lies on the A53 near to the village of, and in the parish of, Astley, north of Shrewsbury.

Upper Astley is a hamlet on the A53 about half a mile to the south of the village of Astley. There is a public house there - the Dog in the Lane (now closed permanently).

== History ==
The village was featured in the Domesday Book of 1086 as a small settlement, with no church, but with a manor, and was called "Hesleie". Back then it was part of the Baschurch Hundred.

The village of Astley today is scenic and quaint, and consists of a number of old dwellings of architectural interest. For this reason a Conservation Area covers almost the entirety of the village, including all of the dwellings there. Astley Conservation Area was designated in 1988 and covers and area of 23.5 hectares/57 acres. It is currently being reviewed and the boundaries may soon be altered slightly. The Conservation Area is centred on the church of St Mary's which dates back to the 12th century. During the medieval era the area was partly administered by nearby Haughmond Abbey (now a ruin).

The oldest existing dwelling is Church House, built in the early 17th century. Church Farmhouse is thought to be 18th century and Firs Farmhouse is dated 1760. There are a number of substantial Victorian era houses too, with large, landscaped gardens and grounds. The village therefore has a great number of fine mature trees.

The most impressive dwelling in Astley today is Astley House, originally a small 18th-century country house set within its own ornamental grounds. The house and its gardens were remodelled in the 19th century and the house grew in stature greatly. The main part of the building is now in the form of a Classical temple, in a Corinthian style. The coach house flanking the main building is also in the style of a Greek Doric temple with a portico in antis.

Nearby is a monument to King George IV (the famous prince regent of the time) which too is in an ancient Roman/Greek fashion. The grounds of Astley House extend quite some distance and are similarly landscaped to a high order.

Astley House, Church House, Church Farmhouse, the Firs Farmhouse and the church of St Mary the Virgin are all listed buildings. There are a number of other interesting old dwellings and outbuildings in a village that has grown slowly over time (despite development continuing apace nearby, notably in Battlefield. The village is effectively by-passed by the A53 and A49 roads, although there were plans in the 1980s to re-route the A53 closer to the village in a wider scheme of road building north of Shrewsbury. Fortunately this did not happen, instead the new A5124 "Battlefield Link Road" was built closer to Shrewsbury in the late 1990s.

The parish church of St Mary the Virgin in the village has what could be the county's oldest church bell, dating back to 1270. In 2012 this bell, now named Mary (after the church's saint), was restored and rehung in the church tower, along with a restored 18th-century bell which is now named Elizabeth (after the late Queen, because it was hung in her Jubilee year). The tower's clock, made by the firm of J.B. Joyce & Co. of Whitchurch, Shropshire, was erected by village public subscription to commemorate peace after the First World War.

== Transport ==
=== Bus Service ===
Astley is served by the 64 route, operated by Arriva Midlands North, which runs between Shrewsbury and Market Drayton via Shawbury.

Bus services in Astley, Shropshire
| Bus operator | Route | Destination(s) | Notes |
|---|---|---|---|
| Arriva Midlands North | 64 | Shrewsbury → Shawbury → Hodnet → Tern Hill → Market Drayton | Some services continue to Hanley via Newcastle-under-Lyme. |

== See also ==
- Listed buildings in Astley, Shropshire
- Upper Battlefield,
- Bings Heath,
- Haughmond Hill,
- Hadnall,
- Harlescott,
- Sundorne,
- Uffington.
