= Upper Battlefield, Shropshire =

Village in Shropshire, England

Coordinates: 52.759°N 2.716°W

Upper Battlefield
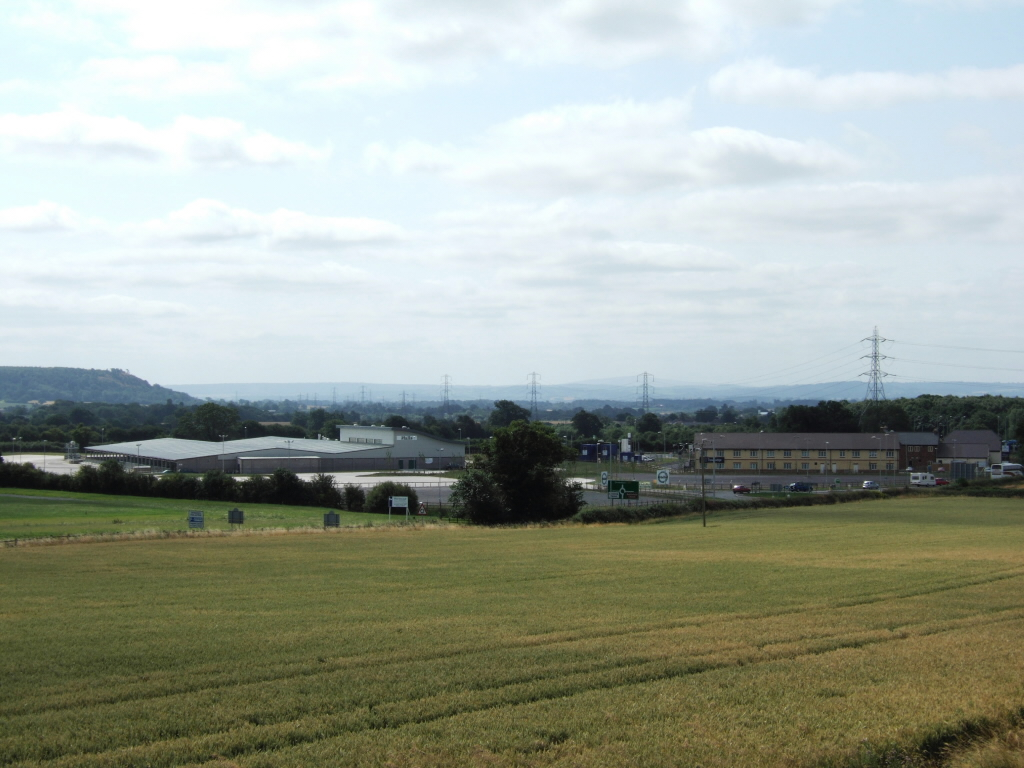
- Shrewsbury's new livestock market at Battlefield, viewed from Upper Battlefield

- Location within Shropshire
- OS grid reference: SJ516182
- Civil parish: Astley
- Unitary authority: Shropshire
- Ceremonial county: Shropshire
- Region: West Midlands
- Country: England
- Sovereign state: United Kingdom
- Post town: SHREWSBURY
- Postcode district: SY4
- Dialling code: 01939
- Police: West Mercia
- Fire: Shropshire
- Ambulance: West Midlands
- UK Parliament: Shrewsbury and Atcham

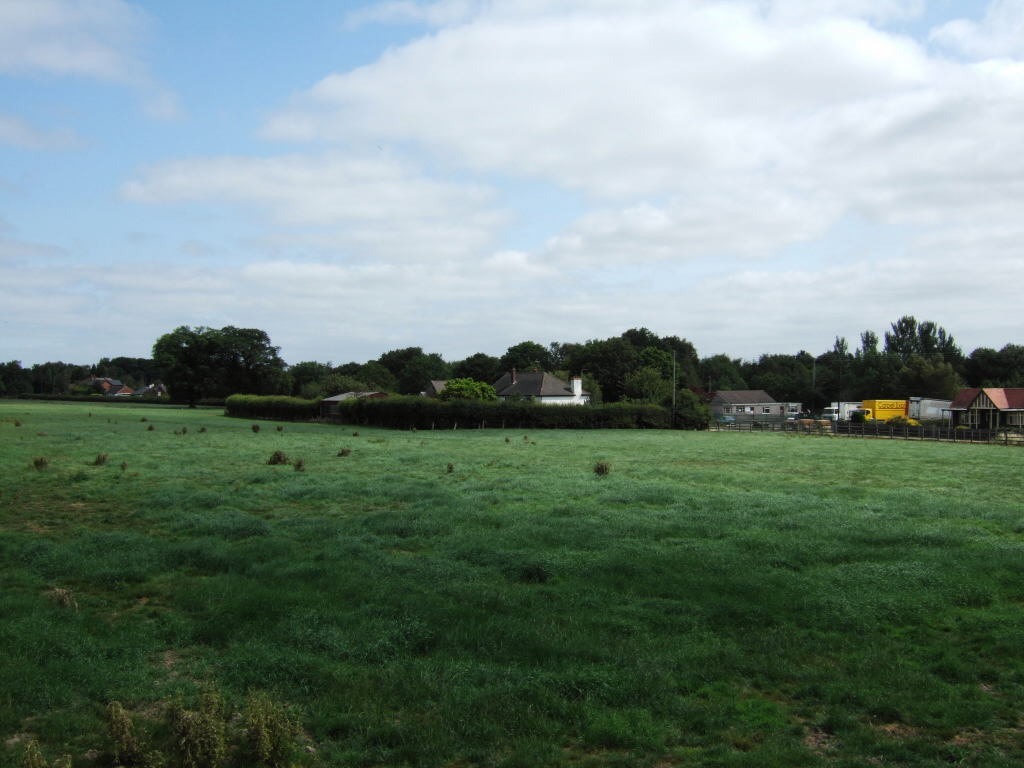
Upper Battlefield

Upper Battlefield is a small village in Shropshire, England. It is named for the nearby 1403 Battle of Shrewsbury.

It lies on the A49 just north of Battlefield. The Welsh Marches railway line runs through the village, and it lies in the parish of Astley.

Recent developments between the village and the town of Shrewsbury have almost merged the two settlements. Upon the recent completion of the new service station and livestock market site at the Battlefield Roundabout, there is only a small field separating the town and Upper Battlefield.
