= Upper Green, Llantilio Crossenny =

Farmhouse

Upper Green
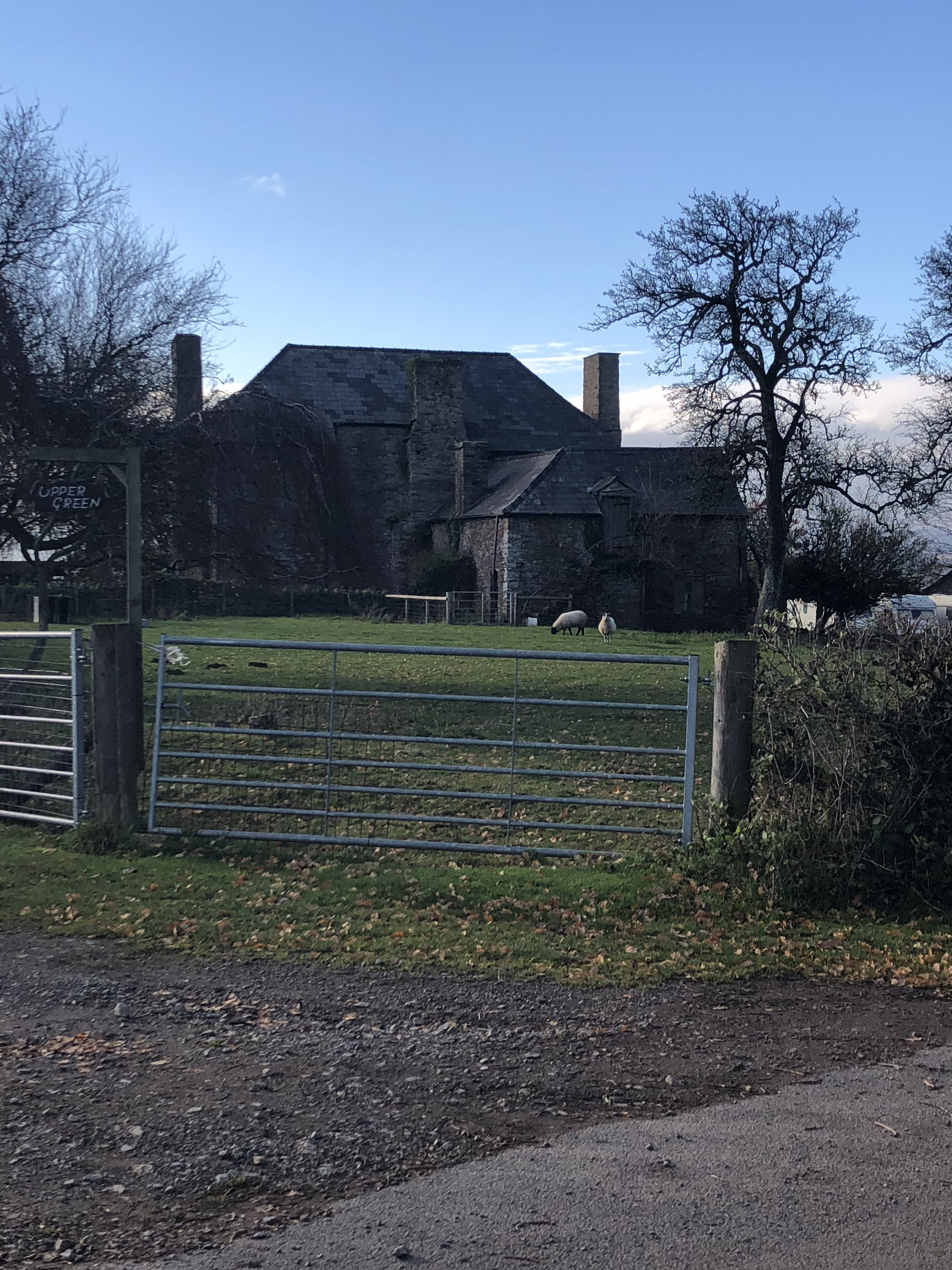
- "a substantial Renaissance farmhouse with exceptionally well-preserved interior"

- Location within Monmouthshire
- 51.8664°N 2.891°W
- Type: House
- Location: Llantilio Crossenny, Monmouthshire

History
- Built: Medieval, 17th and 18th centuries

Site notes
- Architectural style: Renaissance
- Governing body: Privately owned

Listed Building – Grade II*
- Official name: Upper Green
- Designated: 19 November 1953
- Reference no.: 2078

Upper Green, Llantilio Crossenny, Monmouthshire is a farmhouse dating from the Medieval period. The original hall house was enlarged in the 17th century. In the 18th century, a substantial new farmhouse was built which incorporated the hall house as a service wing. Upper Green remains a private house and is a Grade II* listed building.

== History and description ==
The origins of the farmhouse are medieval. The rear wing, the oldest remaining part, incorporates remnants of a cruck-frame roof of what was probably a hall house. In the 17th century, the building was expanded and refaced in stone. In the 18th a large new house was constructed in a Renaissance style and the original hall house was utilised as a service wing. An alternative suggestion is that the two buildings operated as separate living units.

The house is of three storeys, with substantial chimney stacks. It is constructed of rubble stone. The interior is "exceptionally well-preserved, and contains "fine" wooden fittings, including a staircase and wall cupboards, dating from the 18th century. Upper Green has been little studied, appearing neither in Sir Cyril Fox and Lord Raglan's Monmouthshire Houses nor in John Newman's Monmouthshire Pevsner. The house is recorded, although not described, in Peter Smith's Houses of the Welsh Countryside. Smith notes the house on one of his distribution maps as being a stone farmhouse with half-timbered outbuildings. It is a Grade II* listed building.

== Sources ==
- Smith, Peter (1975). Houses of the Welsh Countryside. London: Her Majesty's Stationery Office. ISBN 0-11-700475-8. OCLC 868639211.
