= Common milkwort =

Common milkwort is a common name for several plants and may refer to:

- Polygala sanguinea, native to eastern North America
- Polygala vulgaris, native to Europe
