= Spring line settlement =

Settlements along a line of springs

Spring line settlements occur where a ridge of permeable rock lies over impermeable rock, resulting in a line of springs along the contact between the two layers. Spring line (or springline) settlements will sometimes form around these springs, becoming villages.

In each case to build higher up the hill would have meant difficulties with water supply; to build lower would have taken the settlement further away from useful grazing land or nearer to the floodplain.

Spring line villages are often the principal settlements in strip parishes, with long, narrow parish boundaries stretching up to the top of the ridge and down to the river but being narrow in the direction of adjacent spring line villages.

== Some examples in England ==
- To the north and south of the Howardian Hills in the North Riding of Yorkshire.
- To the west and east of the ridge that extends south from Lincoln and on top of which is the Roman road Ermine Street. The western line (which includes Boothby Graffoe and Navenby) is close under the escarpment; the eastern line (which includes Metheringham) is as much as 6 miles (10 km) away from the crest of the ridge.
- To the south of London and difficult to identify among the continuous housing development of later centuries, there are: Ewell (a derivative of the Old English Et Welle), Cheam, Sutton, Carshalton, Wallington, Beddington, Waddon, Croydon, Addiscombe, Elmers End and Beckenham. Road and place names to the north of the line provide evidence that that area was relatively uninhabited: Cheam Common, Sutton Common, Thornton Heath, and Norwood (a derivative of North Wood).
- Below the northern escarpment of the South Downs are villages such as Edburton, Fulking and Poynings.
- In the Vale of the White Horse (now in Oxfordshire, formerly in Berkshire), villages such as East Ginge, West Ginge, Letcombe Bassett, Childrey and Woolstone are at the top of wooded valleys below the Ridgeway on the north-facing scarp slope.
- In East Anglia, spring line settlements such as Burwell, Cambridgeshire, Swaffham Prior and Cherry Hinton mark the fen edge and are close to the probable Lower Icknield Way.
- In Somerset, at the foot of the southwestern escarpment of the largely limestone Mendip Hills, the settlements of Draycott, Rodney Stoke, Westbury-sub-Mendip, Easton, Wookey Hole, and Wells. At the northern foot of the Mendip Hills, Burrington, Blagdon, Ubley, Compton Martin, West Harptree, East Harptree, and Chewton Mendip. By contrast there are very few settlements on Mendip itself, with only Priddy within the Mendip Hills National Landscape.

== See also ==
- Fall line

== Sources ==
- Humphery-Smith, Cecil (2003). The Phillimore Atlas & Index of Parish Registers (3rd ed.). Chichester: Phillimore & Co. Ltd. ISBN 1-86077-239-0.
