= Edburton Castle Ring =

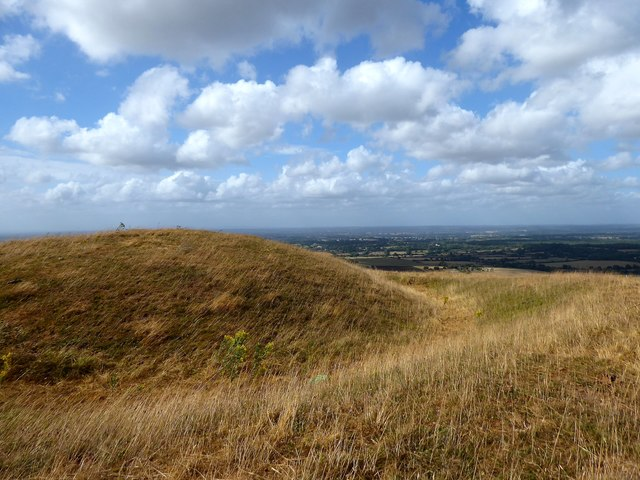
- The ditch on the north-eastern side of the bailey

- Location within West Sussex
- 50°53′7″N 0°14′30″W
- Type: Motte-and-bailey castle
- Location: West Sussex
- OS grid reference: TQ 238 110

Scheduled monument
- Designated: 26 June 1953
- Reference no.: 1012171

Edburton Castle Ring (or Castle Rings) is an archaeological site in West Sussex, England, on the peak of Edburton Hill on the South Downs, near the villages of Edburton and Fulking. It is a Scheduled Monument.

== Description ==
It is a motte-and-bailey castle, thought to have been built soon after the arrival of the Normans in 1066.

The castle survives as earthworks. The motte is a mound of diameter 30 metres (98 ft) and height 2 metres (6 ft 7 in), surrounded by a ditch of width about 6 metres (20 ft). There is a depression in the centre of the motte where there was 19th-century excavation, the monument being mistaken for a barrow. Adjoining the motte to the north is the bailey; the bank enclosing the bailey is up to 1.2 metres (3 ft 11 in) above the interior and up to 14 metres (46 ft) across, with an external ditch of width about 6 metres (20 ft).
