= Beeding Hill to Newtimber Hill =

Protected area in West Sussex, England

Coordinates: 50.887°N 0.224°W

- Site of Special Scientific Interest
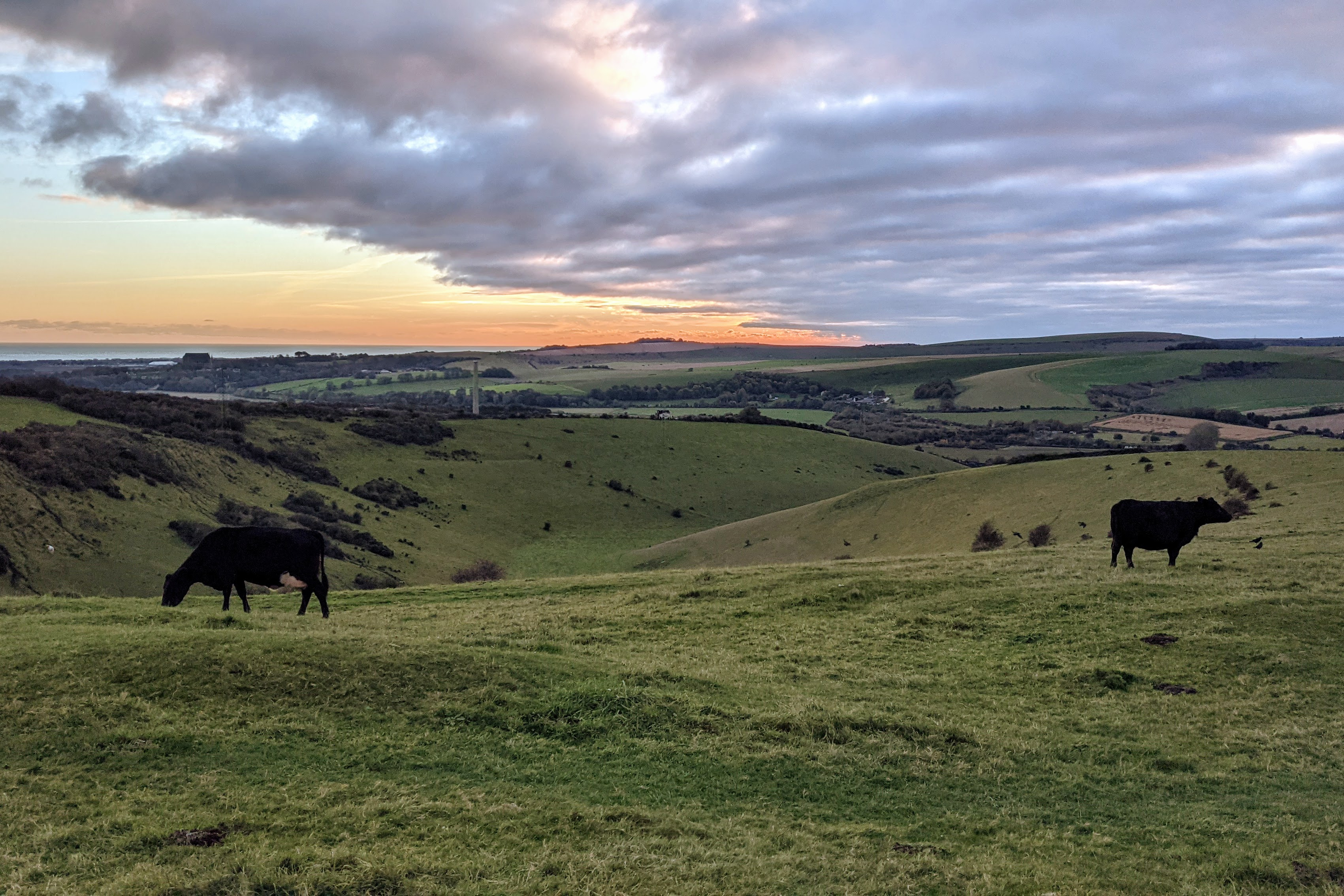

- Location within West Sussex
- Location of Beeding Hill to Newtimber Hill.
- Area of search: West Sussex
- Grid reference: TQ 250 112
- Interest: Biological; Geological
- Area: 321.0 ha (793 acres)
- Notification date: 1986

Beeding Hill to Newtimber Hill is a 321 ha (790-acre) biological and geological Downland Site of Special Scientific Interest (SSSI) north of Shoreham-by-Sea in West Sussex. It is a Nature Conservation Review site, Grade 2, and it includes Devil's Dyke Geological Conservation Review site.

There are thirteen distinct areas within this SSSI. Most of it is on the north-facing slope of the South Downs on unimproved chalk grassland. Grazed chalk downland, such as this, has a diverse flora with around 40 flowering plants per square metre. There are areas of scrub and in places this scrub has developed into woodland, and there are also some areas of mature beech woodland.

The richest areas are dominated by upright brome and fine-leaved grasses such as sheep's fescue and crested hair-grass. The site supports rare orchid species including frog orchid and in the woodlands, yellow bird's nest and bird's nest orchid. The site supports a nationally important assemblage of the Opilionid group of Arachnids (harvestmen), a locality of the nationally uncommon scarce forester moth and the adonis blue butterfly.

== Anchor Bottom to Beeding Hill escarpment ==
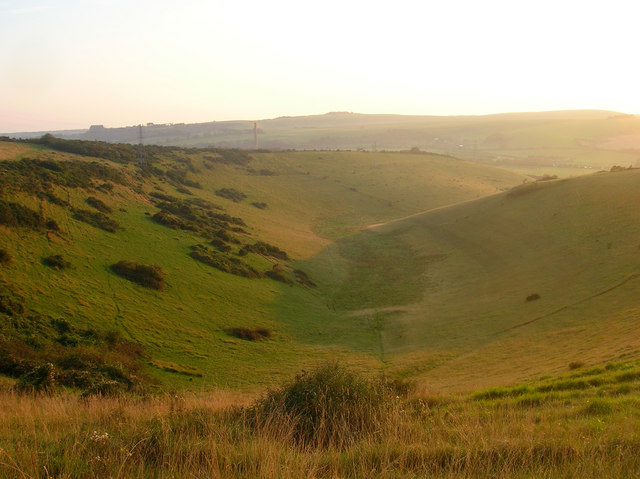
Anchor Bottom at Sunset

The western three areas of the SSSI are in the Upper Beeding parish. These areas are separated from the ten areas to the east by approximately a kilometre of undesignated intensively farmed land. These western areas include Anchor Bottom, a precious piece of unimproved chalk grassland in excellent condition, with many species that are characteristic of good quality chalk grassland such as fairy flax, round-headed rampion, thyme and kidney vetch. There are large Adonis blue butterfly emergences in this area in most years.

The other two areas are both on the north slope of Beeding Hill. The western area (area two) includes the Lynchet Triangle (TQ 207 098), which has medieval ‘cultivation terraces’ which were strips of open fields cultivated until the middle of the nineteenth century. In 2008 there was yellow rattle, three orchid species, common and latticed heath moths and grizzled skipper butterfly as well as glowworms, but the area is deteriorating and is in unfavourable condition, due to lack of grazing.

There are two bostals that run up the escarpment. One, called The Bostal, runs up from Castle Town, Upper Beeding and the other runs up from Golding Barn. This second trackway's sides retain good chalk grassland flora, with horseshoe vetch, orchids and harebell, and overhanging wayfaring tree and old man's beard (wild clematis). The slopes have abundant yellow cowslips in spring and in autumn there are persistent waxcaps fungi. There are many butterflies, moths, mosses and lichen and the tony moss snail and scree snail.

== Truleigh Hill to Fulking Hill ==
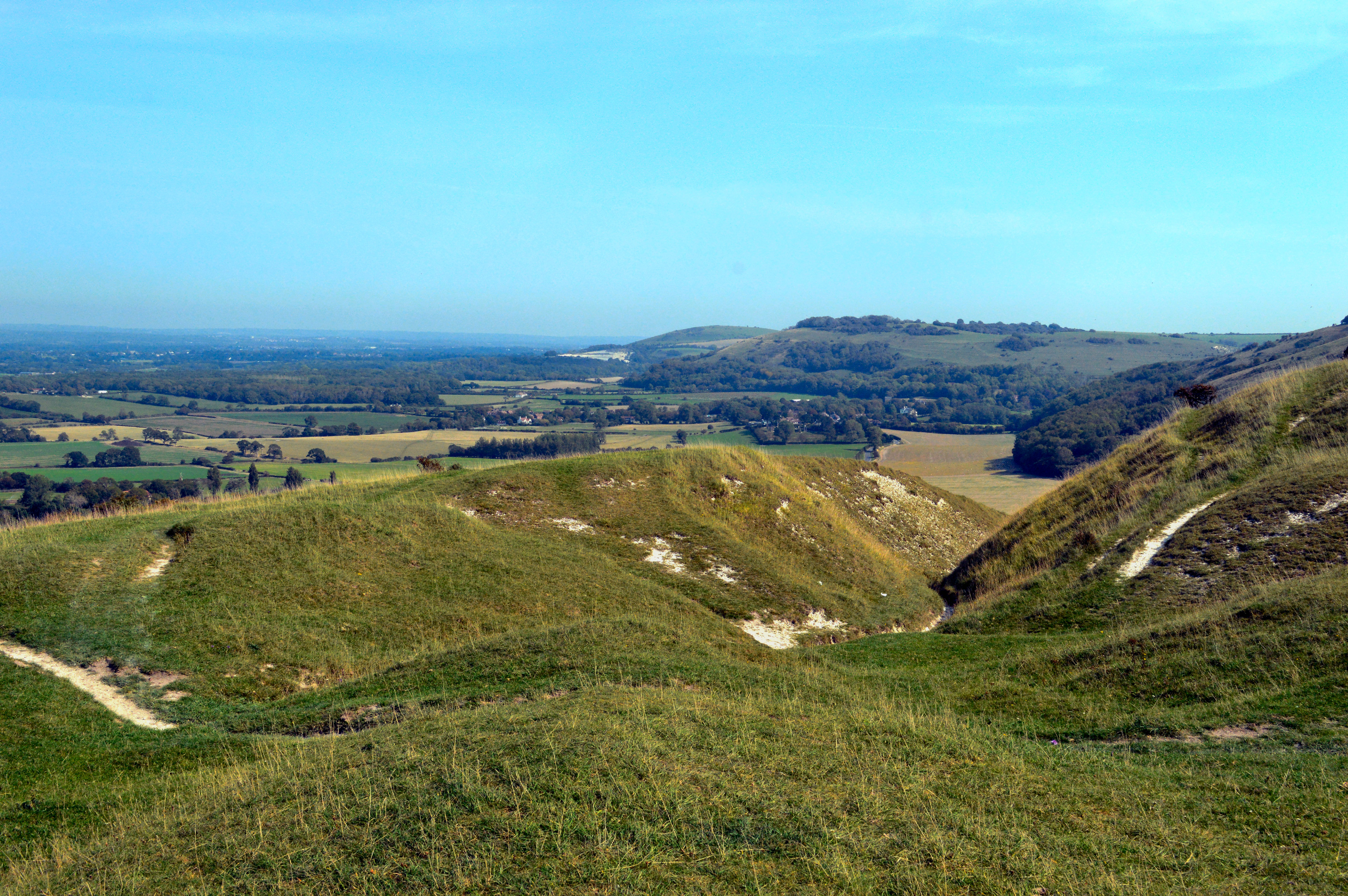
Pathway to Fulking from Perching Hill

The midsection areas run between Truleigh Hill and Fulking Hill (areas four to seven). These areas are largely north-facing escarpment slopes in unfavourable but recovering condition with the exception of Truliegh Hill, which in good condition, with summer flowers such as small and devil's bit scabious, horseshoe vetch and bird's foot trefoil.

This area spans the parishes of Upper Beeding and Fulking and at its centre is Edburton Hill (TQ 237 110), which still has evidence of the banks of a Motte and Bailey castle, built by a Norman overlord. The banks of the Motte and Bailey have field fleawort and chalk milkwort.

There were once four manors that grazed their sheep in this area. These were Truleigh, Aburton (spelt the way old Sussex folk pronounced Edburton), Paythorne and Perching, and each had its chunk of Down pasture on the greensand arable under the Downs, their sticky wooded patch of Gault clay beyond, and more pasture on the fertile lower greensand to the north. Each of these four farmsteads still exist and can be seen from these hills, although only Truleigh Manor still has its old working farmyard. Each of the farmsteads had a daughter farm to the north on the lower greensand — Truleigh Sands, Edburton Sands, Nettledown and Perching Sands. The woods of Tottington-Longlands and Perching Hovel mark the poorly-drained Gault clay. And the spire of Hurstpierpoint church and the glaring white cottages of Nep Town, Henfield, mark the extension of the lower greensand ridge to the north.

There are number of tracks that run up from the Edburton Road, including the Edburton bostal, Perching bostal and Fulking bostal.

== Devil's Dyke and surrounding woodland ==
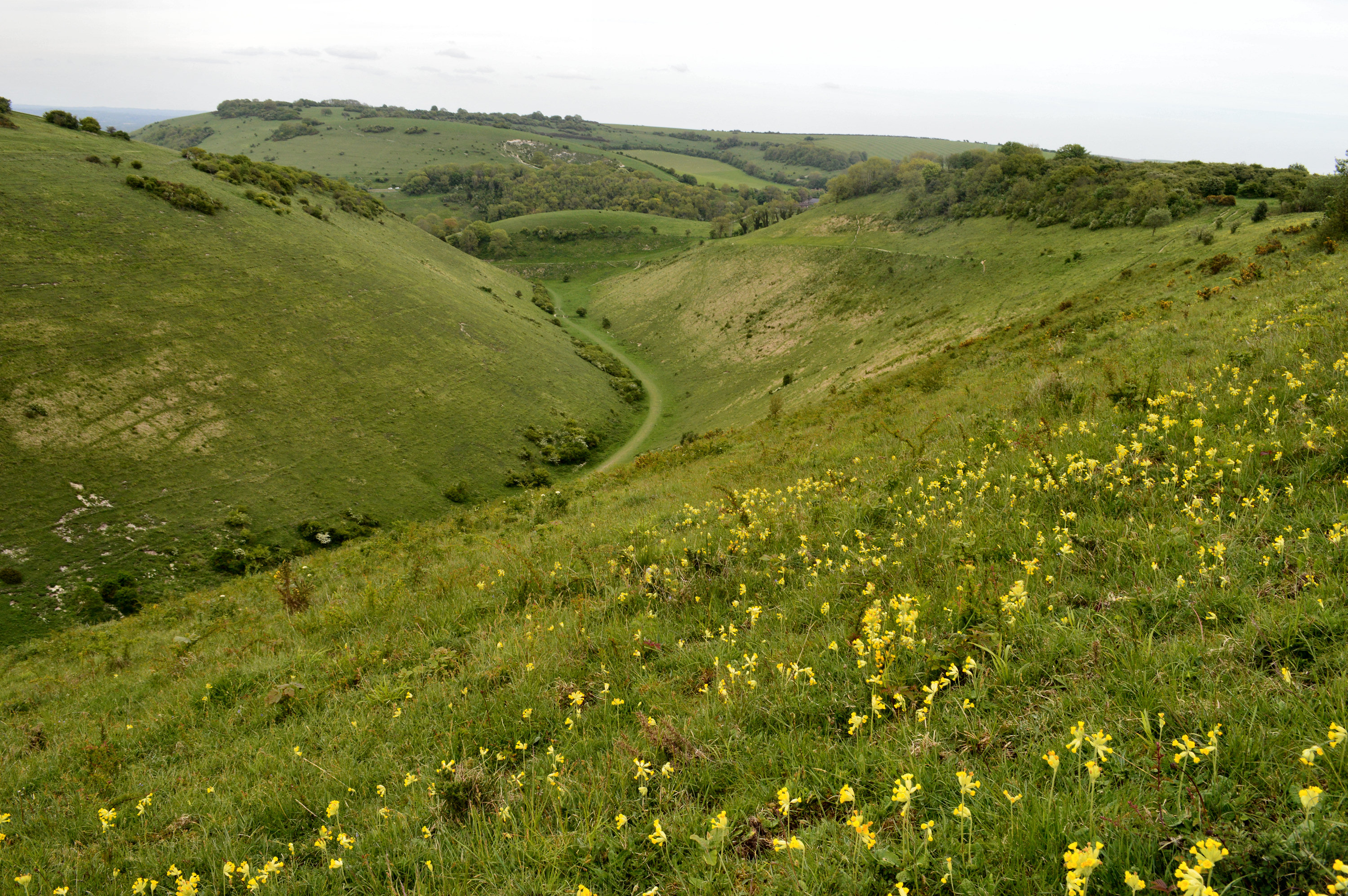
Cowslips on Devil's Dyke

Devil's Dyke (area eight) itself is also in unfavourable but recovering condition, but is geologically important as an example of Pleistocene erosion of a dry chalk valley. The adjacent two areas are categorised as woodland. Summers Down (area nine) is woodland in unfavourable but recovering condition to the south of the Dyke and the Poynings Woodland (area ten) to the north is in favourable condition. The Dyke is in the Poynings parish.

== Newtimber Hill and Newtimber Holt ==
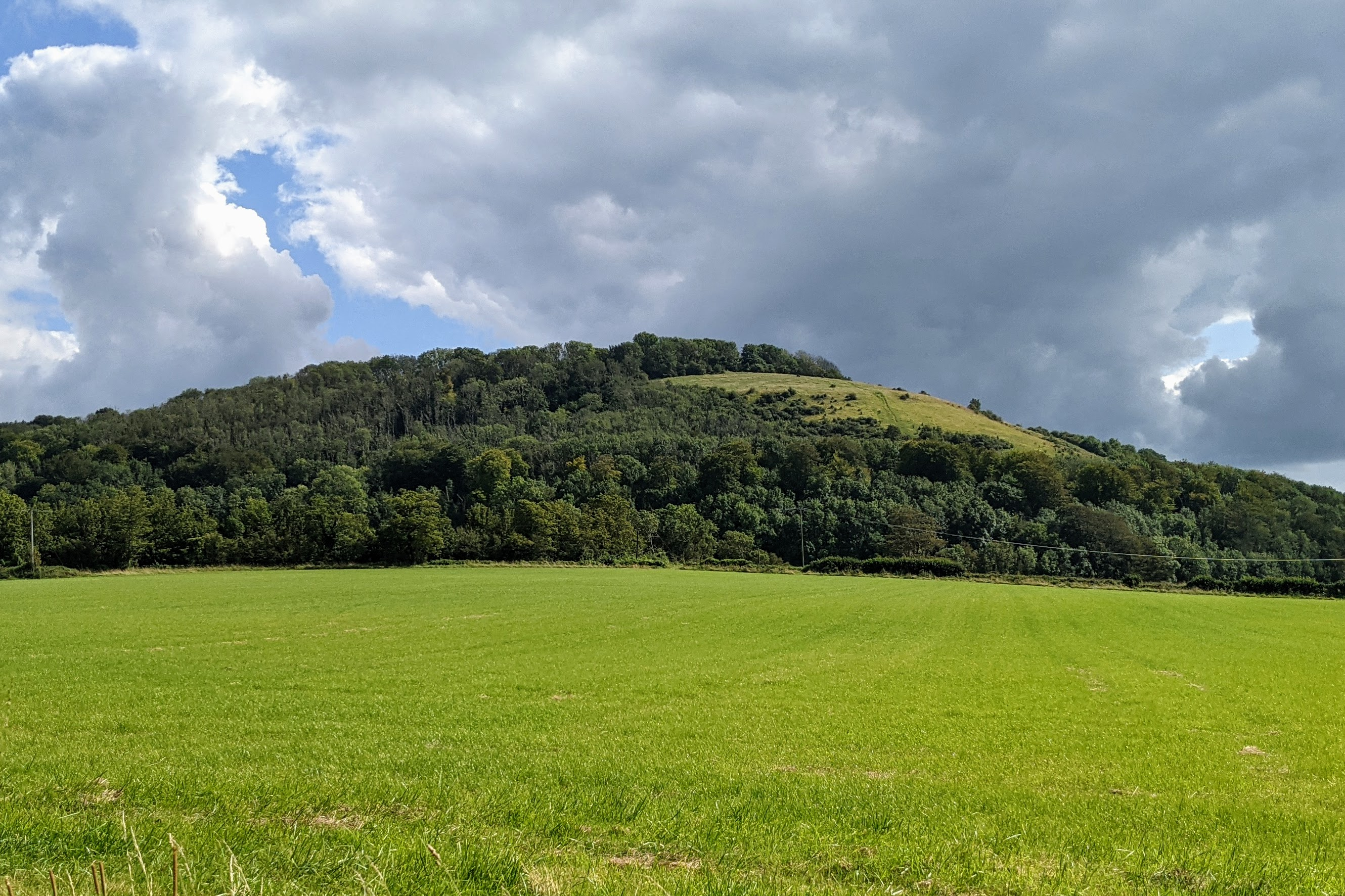
Newtimber Hill

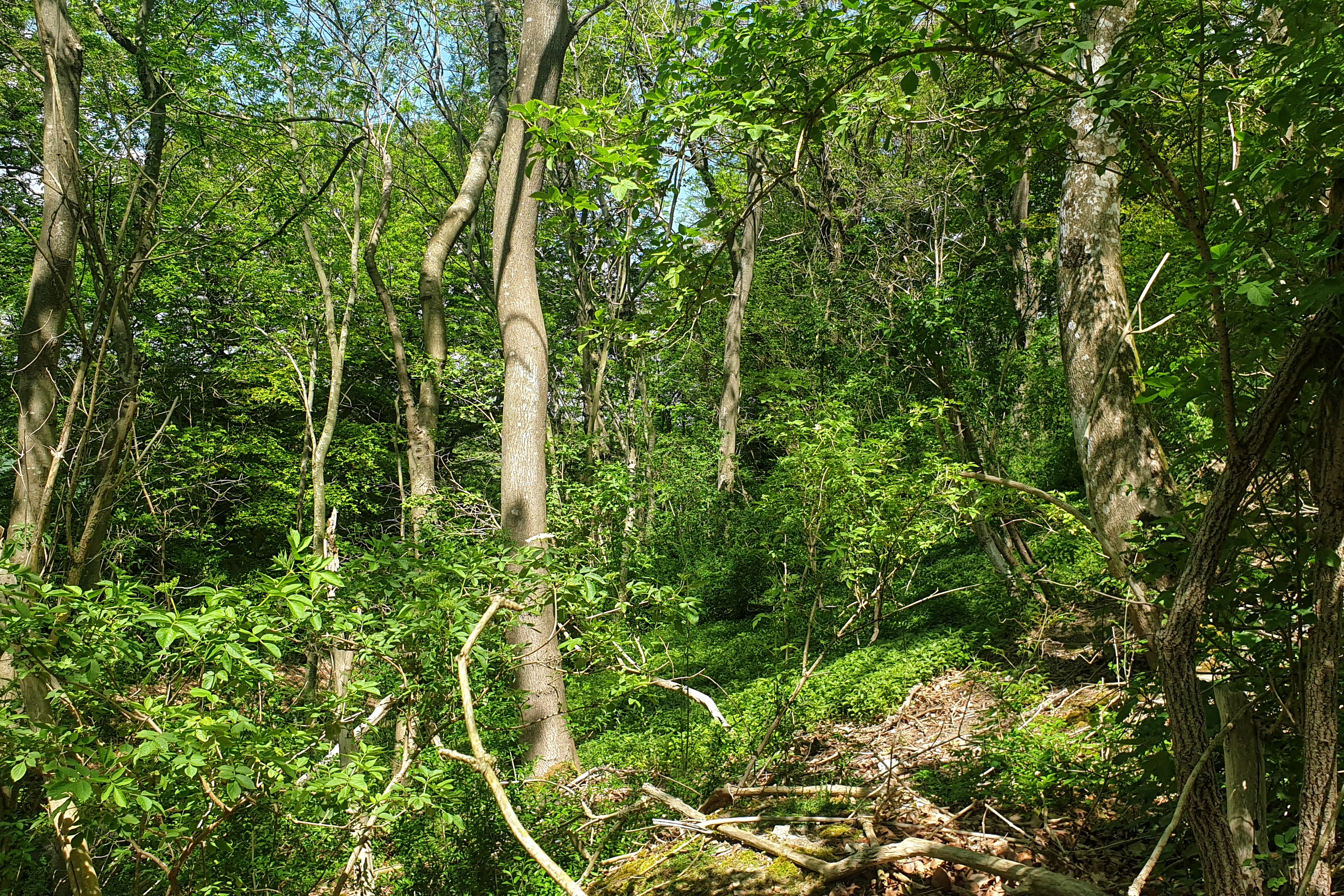
Newtimber Holt

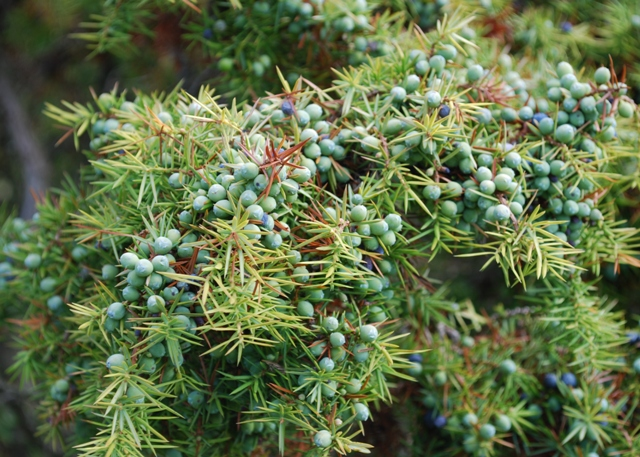
Juniper, West Sussex

Three areas of the SSSI are to the east of the Saddlescombe Road in the Newtimber parish. The Newtimber Hill area (area eleven) itself is a chalk grassland area in favourable condition with dwarf thistle, fairy flax, bird's foot trefoil and rough hawkbit. One can find tiny frog orchids and a funny late-flowering form of burnt-tip orchids in the area There is a ribbon of tormentil where the chalky slopes break to meet the acidic plateau top. There are anthills, cattle terracettes and some years dark green fritillary, the rare silver-spotted skipper butterfly and a big populations of glowworm.

On the top of Newtimber Hill there are two dew ponds (TQ 272 123), one which is dried and now covered with colourful with waxcaps and the other a restored dew pond with much pond life. South of the dew ponds the plateau descends by a staircase of medieval strip lynchets to the combe of sheltered Saddlescombe. The lynchets are chalky in character with nice flowers and old meadow fungi, with waxcap (meadow, crimson and scarlet hood) with scatters of earth tongues and clumps of five or six species of coral fungi.

The final two areas (twelve and thirteen) are woodland areas. Newtimber Holt (TQ 277 126) is in two very steep combes on the Hill's north eastern corner. This is a rich and ancient woodland with a history possibly going back ten thousand years. There are at least twenty ancient woodland indicator species including wych elm, maple and even midland hawthorn (usually found on the Weald Clay). The Holt doesn't have large-leaved lime anymore, but it does have some very tall large-leaved / small-leaved lime hybrids and these, with the good representation of other trees and shrubs, is indicative of the Holt's age. Much of the rest of the slope is now wooded too as the rest of the Hill's northern slope has grown over into ash, beech and hazel secondary woodland since the Victorian Era.

On the west flank of Newtimber Hill (area thirteen), above and below the Saddlescombe Road, are disused braided trackways, that are known locally as the ‘Devil's Stairs’. In this area lives a population of ancient juniper, our most special and rarest native bushy species. Some of the bushes may be as old as four hundred years, despite being only ten metres (thirty foot) or so high. The bushes' ancestors are likely some of the first woody species re-colonizing postglacial Britain, as it is a classic species of the cold tundra grasslands. Unfortunately, the Newtimber junipers are the only native ones on the Brighton Downs, despite Wolley-Dod in 1937 recording it as being abundant to the west of Brighton and present if rare to the east. The National Trust and the Sussex Wildlife Trust are now bravely restoring the juniper's old Down pasture habitat and it is being planted on the A27 bypass at Stanmer and Devil's Dyke.
