= Fulking =

Village and parish in West Sussex, England

Coordinates: 50.88914°N 0.22733°W

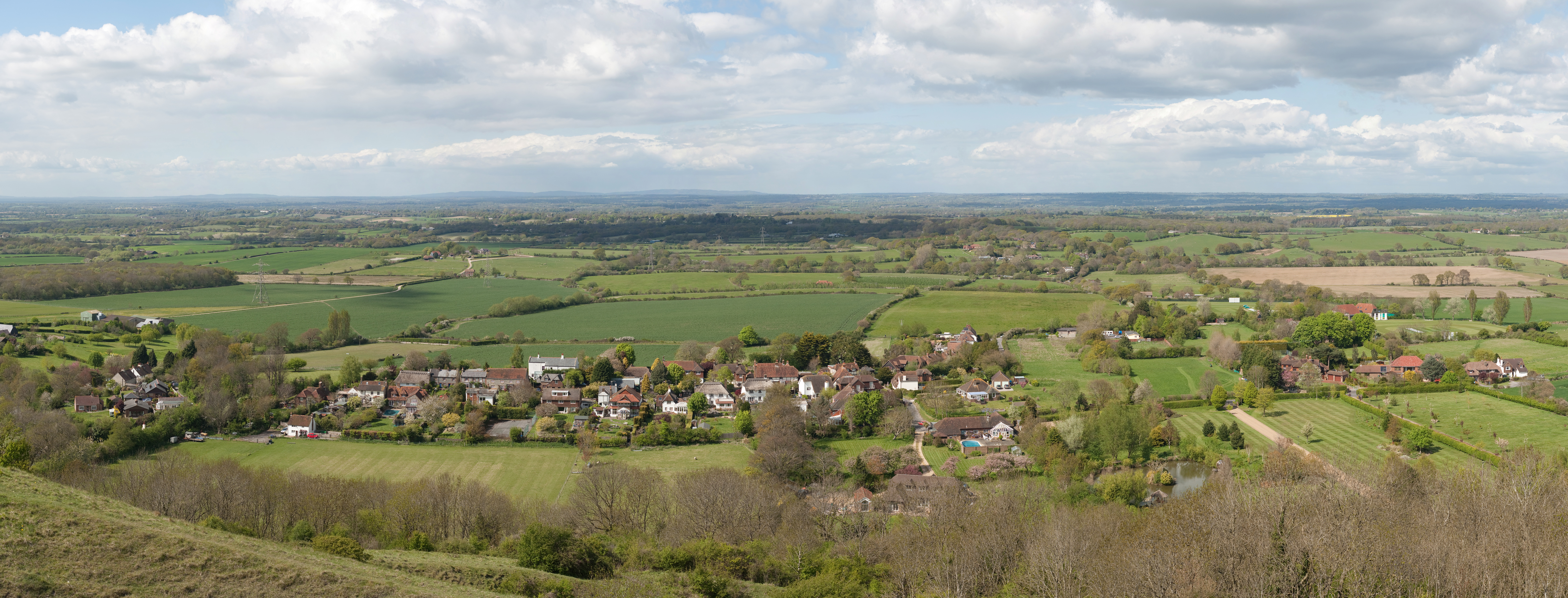
- Fulking from the South Downs Way

- Location within West Sussex
- Area: 6.28 km^{2} (2.42 sq mi)
- Population: 250 2001 Census; 303 2011 Census
  - Density: 40/km^{2} (100/sq mi)
- OS grid reference: TQ247114
  - London: 42 miles (68 km) N
- Civil parish: Fulking
- District: Mid Sussex
- Shire county: West Sussex
- Region: South East
- Country: England
- Sovereign state: United Kingdom
- Post town: HENFIELD
- Postcode district: BN5
- Dialling code: 01273
- Police: Sussex
- Fire: West Sussex
- Ambulance: South East Coast
- UK Parliament: Arundel and South Downs
- Website: Fulking community website

Fulking is a village and civil parish in the Mid Sussex District of West Sussex, England. The parish lies wholly with the South Downs National Park.

The parish is located on the north slopes of the South Downs, five miles (8 km) to the north-west of Brighton, sandwiched between the Upper Beeding and Poynings parish. The civil parish covers an area of 628.31 hectares (1,552.6 acres). The downland scarp, which includes the Fulking and Perching bostals (paths), is part of the Beeding Hill to Newtimber Hill designated Site of Special Scientific Interest.

== History ==
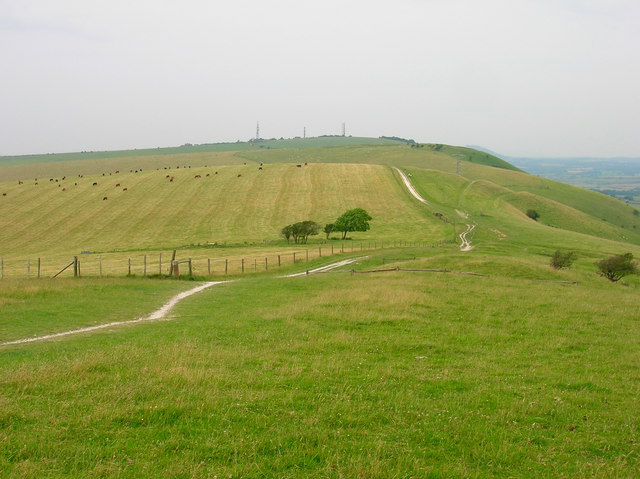
Perching Hill from Fulking Hill

Fulking was originally part of the parish of Edburton. The parish was unusual in that part lay in Bramber rape and Burbeach hundred and part in Lewes rape and Poynings hundred (usually parish boundaries followed rape boundaries). The civil parish of Fulking was created from the eastern half of the ancient parish (sometimes referred to as 'the ecclesiastical parish') in 1894, after the creation of the administrative counties of West Sussex (which incorporated Bramber Rape) and East Sussex (which incorporated Lewes Rape) in 1889. The remainder of Edburton was added to Upper Beeding parish in 1933. Fulking transferred from East Sussex to West Sussex with the creation of Mid Sussex District in 1974.

== Notable buildings and areas ==
Map

Fulking sits along the spring line at the Downs foot where the fertile band of Upper Greensand and Grey Chalk attracted early farmers to build a string of hamlets and villages including Fulking itself, Tottington, Truleigh, Edburton, Perching, Poynings and Newtimber.

As a consequence of its history, Fulking has no parish church of its own. Ecclesiastically, it remains part of the parish of Edburton, and uses St Andrew's church, Edburton, as its parish church. The church is part of the Downland Benefice, together with the churches in Poynings, Newtimber and Pyecombe. Fulking's old houses (TQ 247 114) are a plum pudding of different types: one or two are made of local greensand, some are timber framed (like the Shepherd and Dog pub, under its stucco), some flint, some brick, one or two thatched, even one with a corrugated iron extension. The house are mainly expensive, but not exclusively and it has some council-built homes.

Since the Norman conquest one thousand years ago, the Crown Estate owned the Poynings Estate, which covered around 4000 acres including many farms in the Weald and on the Downs at Fulking, Poynings and Pyecombe. It was all sold between 1980 and 1984 to tenant farmers, but some have noted that in public ownership, the estate could have been at the heart of the new South Downs National Park driving forward sustainable farming and landscape restoration.

=== Listed buildings ===
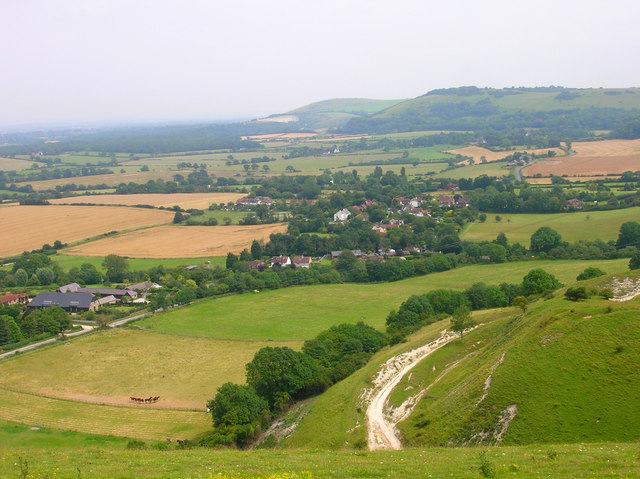
Fulking from Edburton Hill

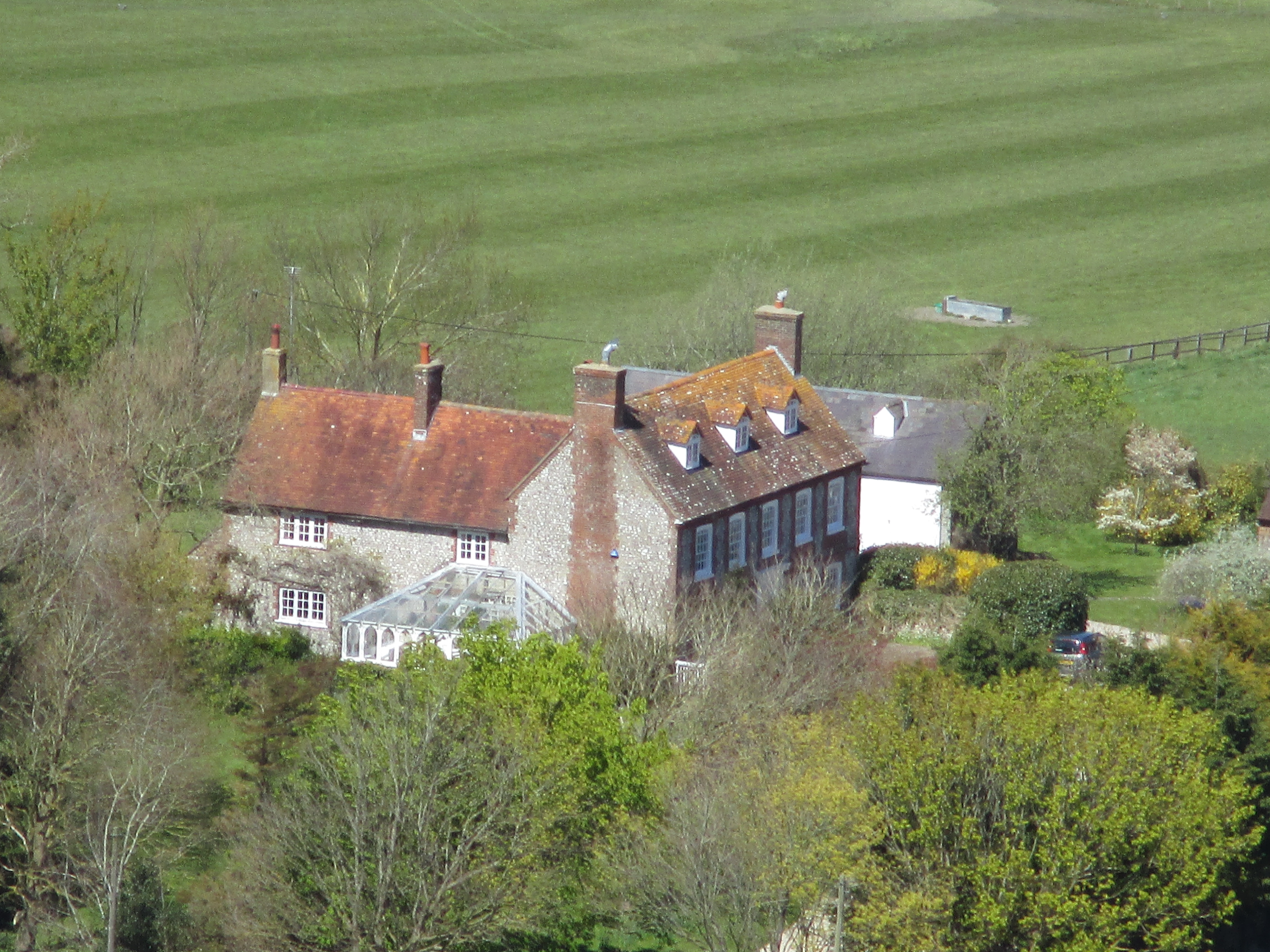
Perching Manor Farmhouse

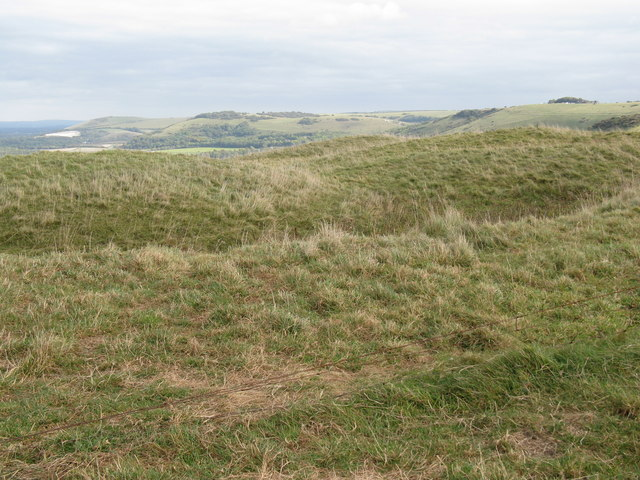
Motte and Bailey at Edburton Hill

Fulking civil parish contains 22 listed buildings. Of these, one is Grade II* and the remaining 21 are Grade II.

The Grade II* listed building is:

- Perching Manor Farmhouse (List Entry Number 1354845), an L-shaped 18th century house.

=== Scheduled monuments ===
The parish contains four scheduled monuments.

- Motte-and-bailey castle on Edburton Hill (List Entry Number 1012171), the earthworks and interior area of a castle believed to date from the immediate post-Conquest period, soon after October 1066.
- Bowl barrow on Scabes Castle (List Entry Number 1014950), lying on the parish boundary between Fulking and Poynings, an originally circular funerary monument, now a roughly oval mound, having been levelled by modern ploughing on its eastern side.
- Bowl barrow on Fulking Hill (List Entry Number 1014951), a circular mound which shows signs of part-excavation in the past.
- Deserted medieval settlement and associated cultivation terraces on Perching Hill (List Entry Number 1015125). Downland was rarely inhabited during the medieval period; the establishment of the settlement is probably due to the presence of an underground water course in the coombe, indicated by a well about 60 m to the west of the monument.

=== 1886 Water supply system ===
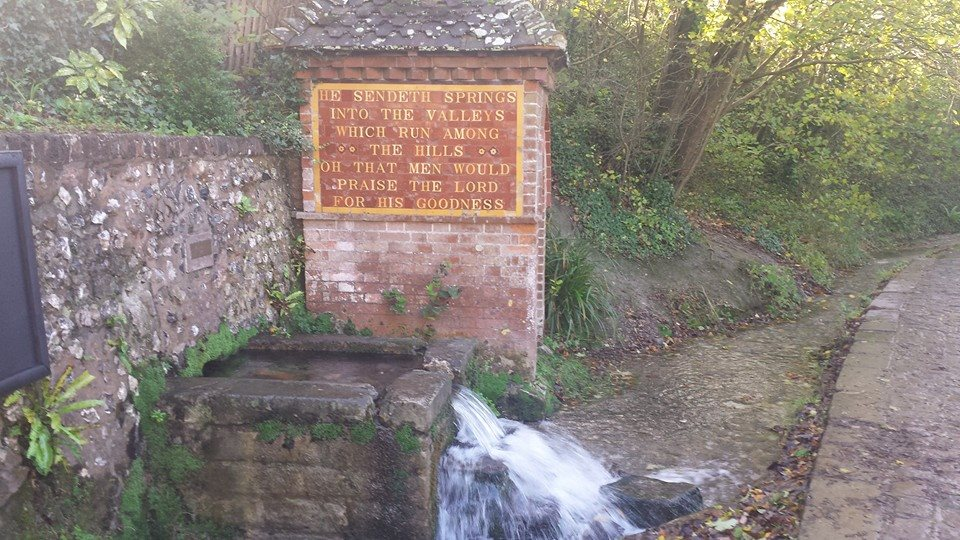
John Ruskin Pump House, Fulking

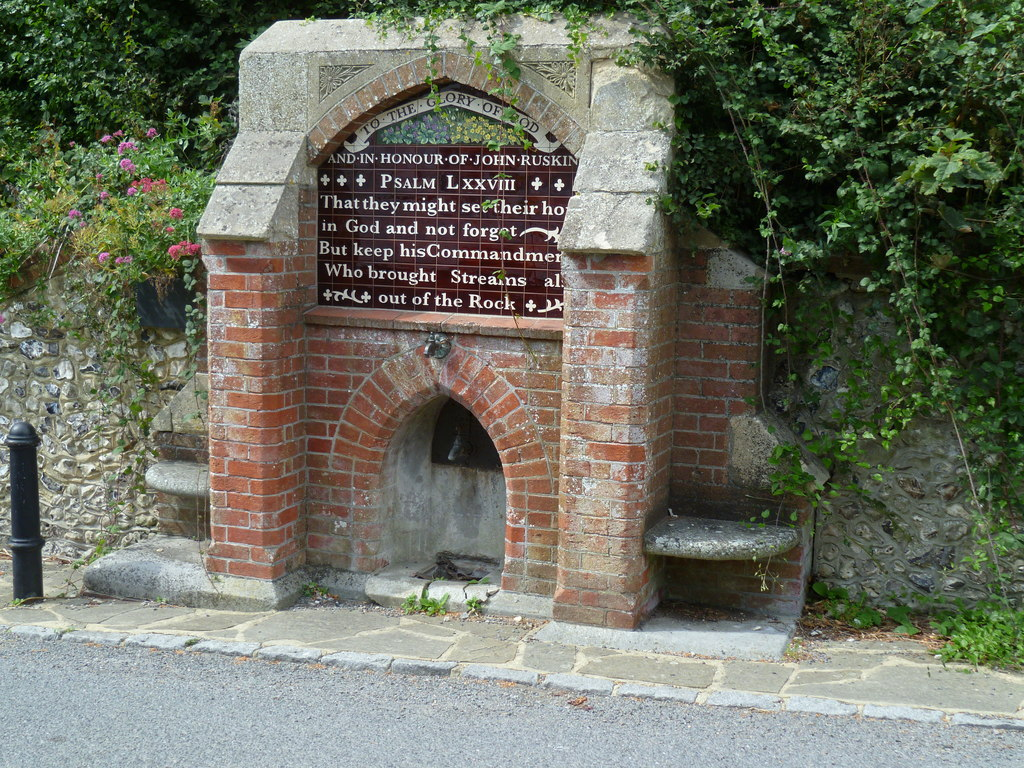
The Ruskin Tap, Fulking

A distinctive feature of Fulking is the remains of a late Nineteenth Century water supply system. A hydraulic ram, housed in small building near the Shepherd and Dog public house, pumped water from Fulking Hill to a reservoir at the western end of the village street, where a drinking fountain and water trough were provided. The water was then fed by gravity to two further reservoirs, supplying two hand pumps along the street.

The building housing is a Grade II listed building (List Entry Number 1354830) and the hydraulic ram bears the inscription,

‘He sendeth springs into the valleys which run among the hills | Oh that men would praise the Lord for his goodness’ (Psalm 104, verse 10 and Psalm 107, verse 8).

The drinking fountain is also listed (List Entry Number 1334374), and bears the inscription,

‘To the glory of God | And in honour of John Ruskin | Psalm LXXVIII | That they might set their hope in God, and not forget the works of God | But keep his commandments | Who brought streams also out of the rock’ (Psalm 58, verses 7 and 16)

The system was installed in 1886. Henry Willett, a wealthy brewer from Brighton, and John Ruskin are usually credited with devising and instigating the water supply scheme. However, contemporary newspaper accounts give credit for the scheme to Rev. F. Gell, rector to Edburton, with generous support from Henry Willet. Ruskin himself, in a letter to Willet dated Brantwood, 16 June 1887, said ‘I was grieved by your inscription on the fountain, for it made my name far too conspicuous, nor did I feel that the slightest honour was owing to me in the matter’.

There are also two associated hand pumps in the village (List Entry Number 1096867 and List Entry Number 1285792).

=== Fulking Stream ===
Fulking Stream is a 'chalk stream' and runs into the River Adur. There is a good cluster of white and crack willow veteran trees around the confluence of the Edburton Stream and the Fulking Stream. A huge three span girth pollard crack willow on the waterside (TQ 275 130) is now in a state of collapse.

=== Perching ===
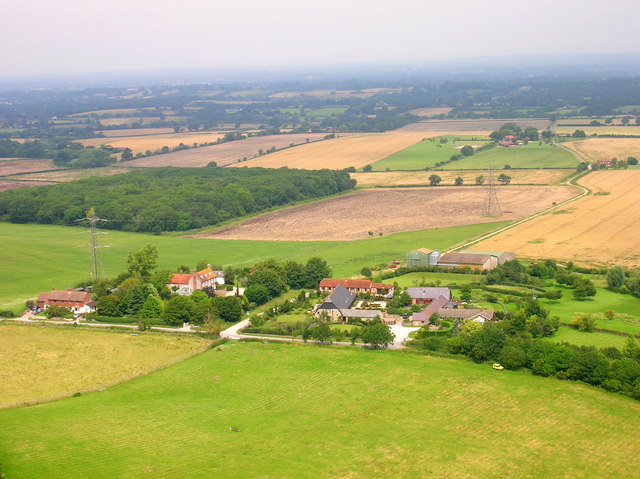
Perching Manor

Many of the areas around Fulking reference Perching. Edburton, the historic parish, contained four small manors: Aburton, Paythorne, Perching and Truleigh. Of these, Perching was by far the most important. The name Perching comes from the Saxon, people of the paddock (or small enclosure). Perching had a watermill in 1086 when the Domesday Book was compiled. This was used to grind the grain grown by the lord of the manor and his tenants.

==== Perching Sands ====
So called because the area sits the fertile bands of Upper and Lower Greensand and Grey Chalk, this is a special area. Just east of Perching Sands Farm the Fulking Stream meets the Poynings Stream at Fullingmill Bridge (TQ 243 125) and cuts north through the Lower Greensand ridge to form a short rocky gill (TQ 248 125). The word 'gill' is found only in the Weald and the English northwest, and refers to the deep clefts (mini ravines) carved there by aeons of busy tumbling streams. Although most Sussex gills are in the High Weald, there are some in the Low Weald too such as this one. The public footpath crosses the gill at the Fullingmill Bridge above the rocky waterfall which crashes to a shady pool below. It is a regular spot for grey wagtail. There is a grand veteran oak perched on the steep bank above the east side of the pool, as well as a little willow carr wood nearby. Beyond the gill to the north, the Stream slows, and there are black tailed skimmers and demoiselles (TQ 243 128).

Perching Sands Farm is no longer a working farm. Where the light soils of 'the sands', the Lower Greensand, are ploughed, plants like bugloss, sticky mouse ear, thale cress, and field pansy grow, and the glossy ant spider, (which pretends to be an ant) loves it. However, despite the productivity of the soil, the line of old farms have mainly been bought by people wishing to enjoy the traditional farmsteads and large gardens. On this fertile outcrop only South Tottington Sands and Poynings Grange are still working farms.

==== Perching Hovel Wood ====
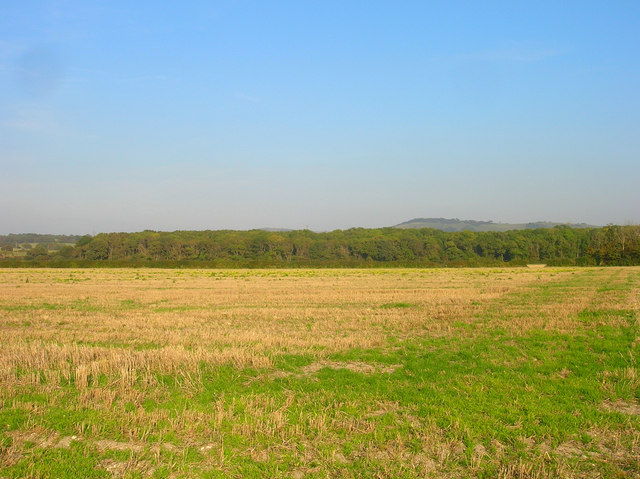
Perching Hovel Wood

Perching Hovel Wood (TQ 239 119) is a wet wood of mainly outgrown ash coppice stools and is currently suffering from the ash die back disease. The woodland is too wet for many fungi, but scarlet elf cup, elastic saddle and willow shield have been found here.

==== Perching bostal ====
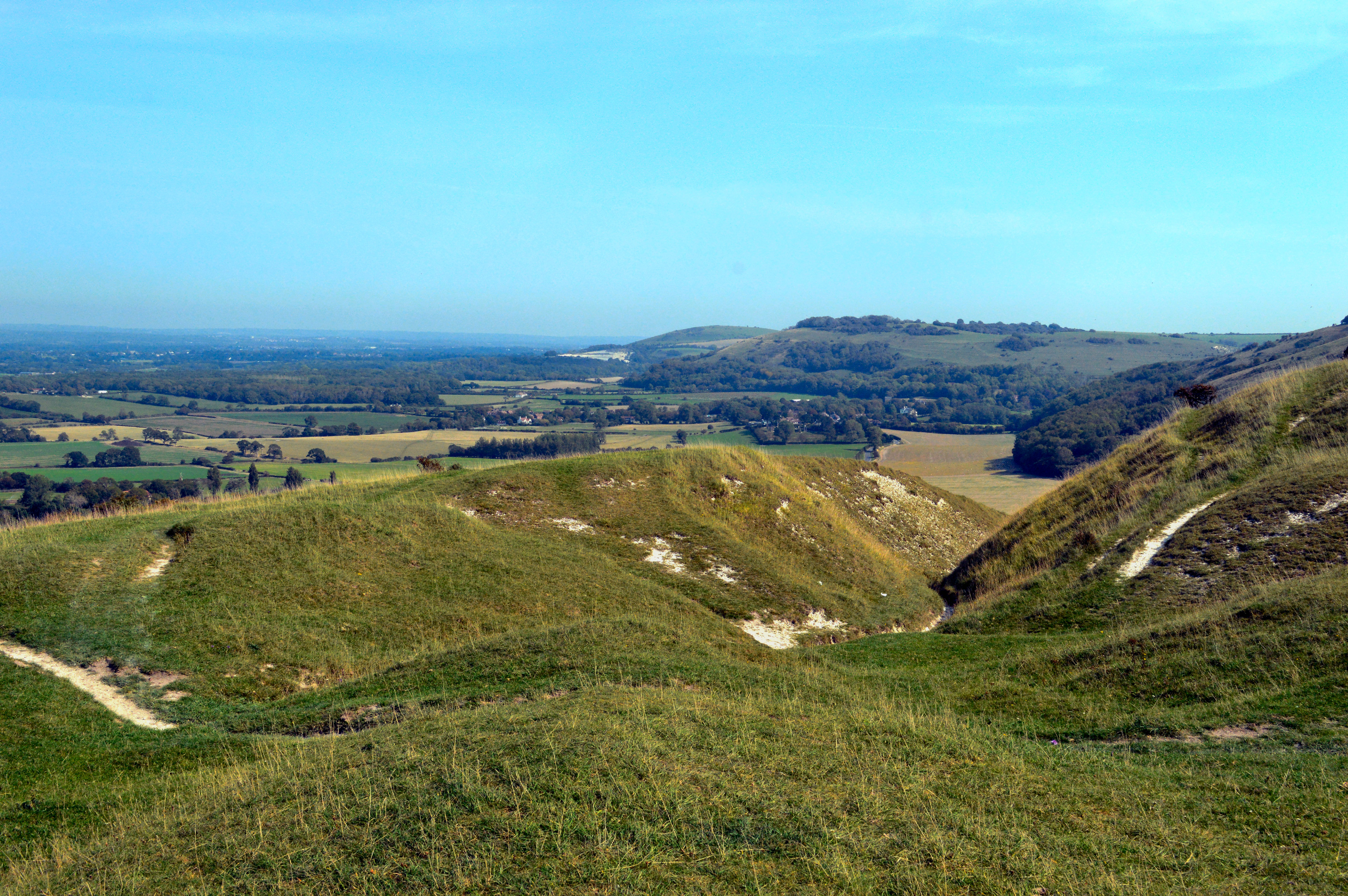
Perching Hill bostal

The Perching bostal (TQ 241 111) is so deep in parts that it looks like a quarry, with bare blocks of chalk forming its walls. Water gushing down it during storms forms a bare runnel down its floor. In one place tufted hair-grass and hard rush can be found, as though this was a Wealden meadow, not dry chalk country. In hot summer evenings male glowworms shine their blue-green light. In high summer carline thistle and cushions of thyme thrive, whilst other plants wilt, and wall brown butterfly, chalk carpet and black pyrausta moths enjoy the aridity.

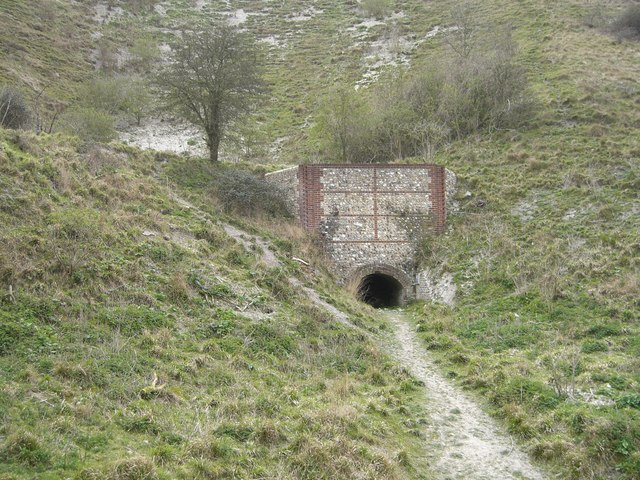
Fulking lime kiln

At the base of the bostal is the grassed over remains of a chalk pit with its Victorian lime kiln beautifully restored. There's another one south of Edburton church, too.

=== Scarp and Downland ===
The Perching bostal climbs up the bank to the Perching Hill. To the east, Fulking bostals are less well trod and rise to Fulking Hill. The escarpment forms part of the Beeding Hill to Newtimber Hill Site of Special Scientitic Interest (SSSI).

==== Perching Hill ====
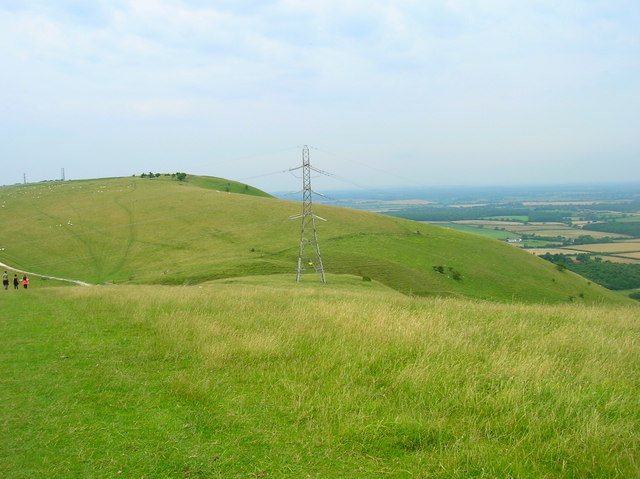
Electricity Pylon from Perching Hill

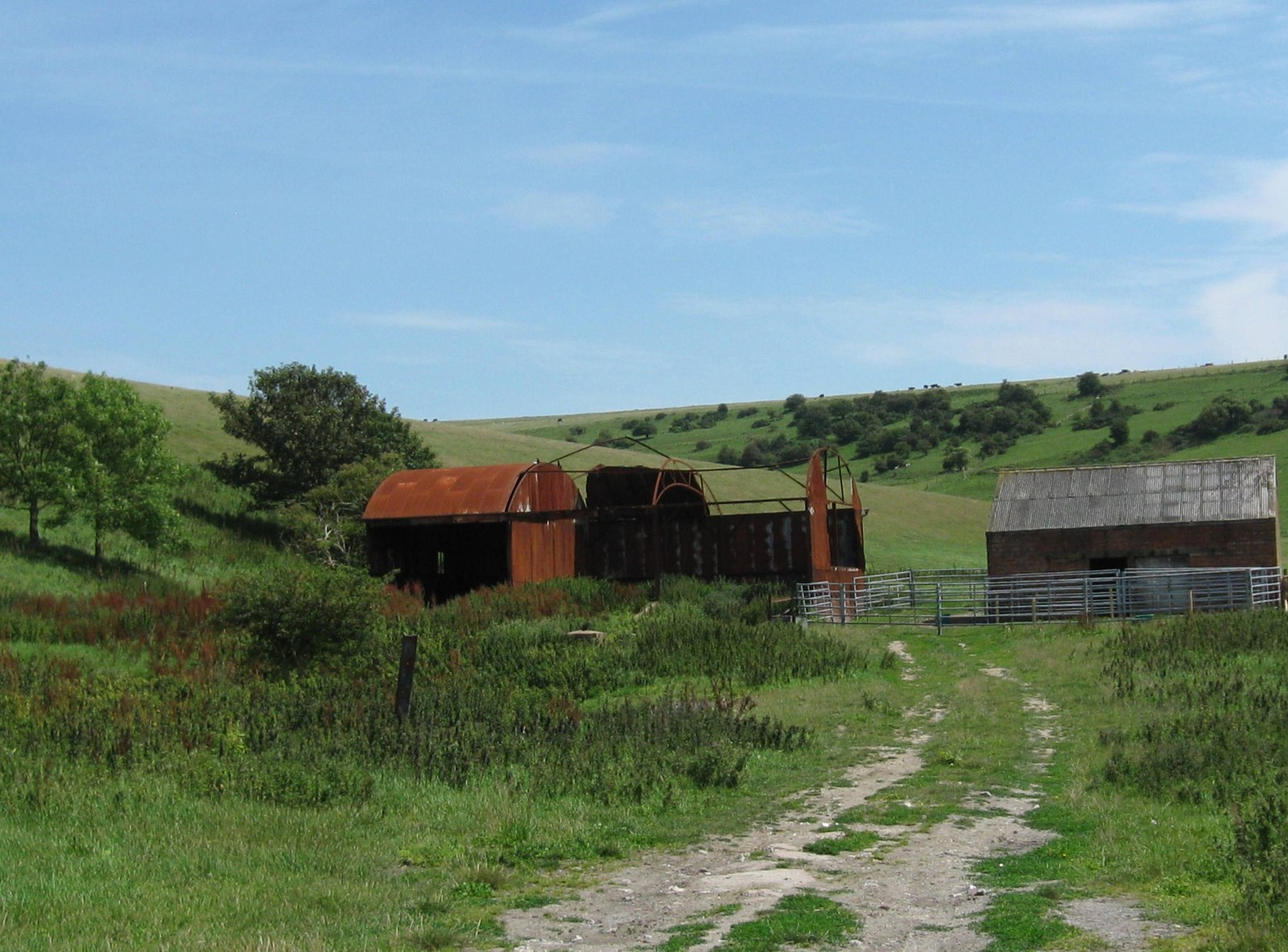
Perching Hill Barns

Perching Hill (TQ 244 109) is at the top of the scarp slope. There is a rare Downland medieval hamlet, whose strip-cultivated open field survived until Victorian times. This is probably a result of the medieval expansion of the Perching Manor in Fulking and probably due to the presence of an underground water course in the coombe, indicated by a well about sixty metres to the west of the monument.

Perching Hill's west slope (TQ 241 105) is a remote place: just sheep, pylons, a rusting barn, big modern pastures, and a slim fragment of the old Down pastures where the steepness of the slopes halted the plough. The site has many old Down pasture species, including spring sedge, orchids and devil's-bit. The area used to have heath snail, too.

==== Fulking Hill ====
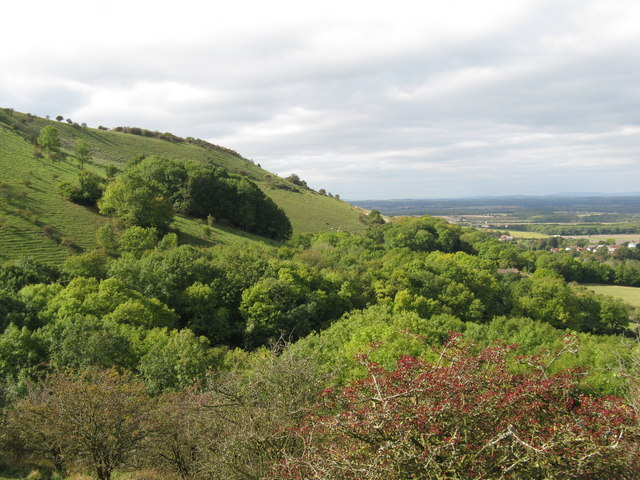
View west to the escarpment of Fulking Hill

Fulking Hill (TQ 250 105) is the peak immediately west of Devil's Dyke. It also known as Fulking Tenantry Down as it is one of the three surviving Down pasture commons on the Brighton Downs. It had at least four prehistoric barrows, but only two are now visible above ground. One of them marks the southern end of the eastern boundary of the common and the other sits by the South Downs Way above the Fulking Hill western bostal. That is a fine example, still with its flowery turf. On the western side of its dip slope, there was a working medieval strip cultivated open field until late 19th century. There were twenty three strips of around an acre each in size. The very tall old lynchets on the dip slope of these strips (TQ 246 103) are where the old Down pasture wildlife survives. There are bits of betony, rockrose and rampion, and in autumn there is scarlet hood, golden, and other waxcaps making splashes of colour.

The scarp slope grasslands and bostal have their aboriginal turf intact and full of interest. Some years there are fly, spotted and twayblade orchids. The short turf where the two bostals cross near the bottom of the slope is rich with herbs and chalk loving butterflies. There are lots of cowslips. Since being put down to grass under the National Trust’s management after half a century of tillage, gorse reappeared on the common's dip slope from the long-dormant seed bank. After a few years snowy waxcap and witches hat also reappeared.

Hidden up the Combe above the Shepherd and Dog is the Fulking springhead (TQ 247 111). With Pretty monkeyflower's matting the gill floor. There is fool's water cress and the stream bed has hundreds of tiny caddis cases, just like the Edburton springhead.

==== Tenant Hill ====
Tenant Hill is in the very south of the parish, bordering Upper Beeding and the Brighton Downland. To its west side is an area known as Paythorne Down (TQ 239 095). The site is over a third of a mile long and has very little scrub except some gorse and thorn at the northern end, and there is strong lynchetting at the southern end, where there was a Roman peasant farm. At the northern end, at the base of the gorsey slope, there was a medieval peasant farm.

The site has the rare field fleawort, which flowers in late spring and early summer and is often associated with prehistoric sites. In spring, too, it has cowslip, hairy violet, skylark and meadow pipit, and some lizards. There are not great displays of flowers here, especially because of the year long grazing, but this site has three small snails: the blind snail, the scree snail and the moss snail, all three indicative of the antiquity of this pasture.

=== Clappers Lane ===
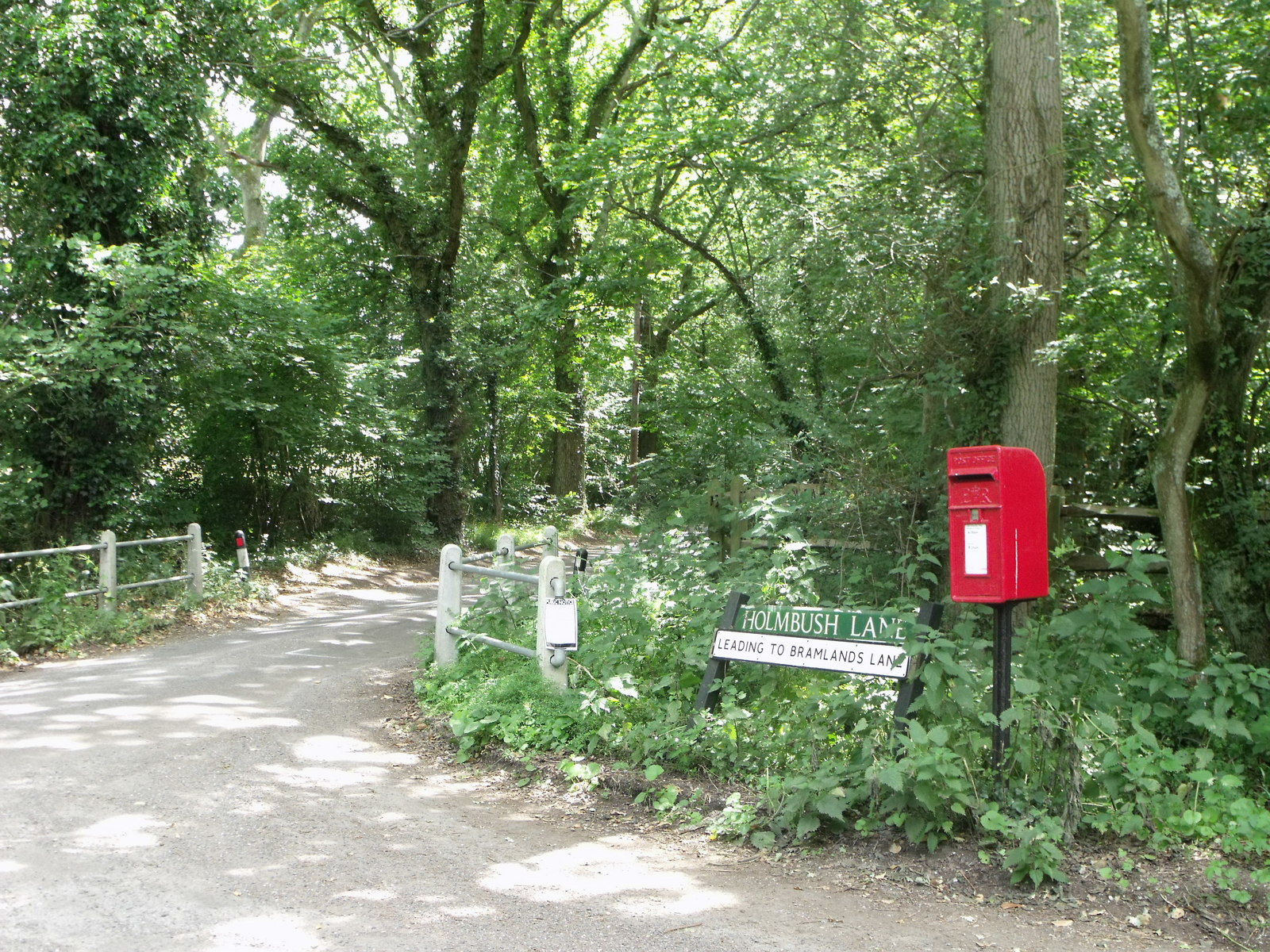
Junction of Holmbush Lane and Clappers Lane

Clappers Lane to the east of the parish, running north from Fulking village, was once probably an old swine pasture drove. More recently it was once a place of market gardens and orchards, but it is no longer either as small scale horticulture has suffered from the European competition and the giant economies of scale demanded by the supermarkets and major retail outlets. The Lane takes its name from the early plank (clapper) bridge across the Poynings Stream (TQ 250 125). Just north of the bridge over the Poynings Stream and to the east of the Lane is a fine little marsh in a gully (TQ 250 128) with great tussock sedge, some carnation and black sedge, ragged robin, water figwort, which support a good number of butterfly including common blue and green-veined whites.

== Governance ==
=== Civil Parish ===
Fulking Parish Council has five parish councillors. The Parish Council holds an annual meeting (usually in May) and at least three other ordinary meetings a year; additional meetings may be called to discuss planning applications. Meetings are held at Fulking Village Hall.

=== Non-metropolitan district ===
Fulking civil parish is in Hurstpierpoint and Downs Ward of the non-metropolitan district of Mid Sussex; the ward returns three councillors to Mid Sussex District Council.

The responsibilities of district councils usually include local planning, housing, local highways, building, environmental health, and refuse collection. However, the parish lies wholly with the South Downs National Park. The planning authority for Fulking is therefore the South Downs National Park Authority (SDNPA), the statutory planning authority for the National Park area.

=== Non-metropolitan county ===
Fulking civil parish is in the Hurstpierpoint and Bolney electoral division of the non-metropolitan county of West Sussex. The division returns one councillor to West Sussex County Council.

The functions of county councils include education, transport, strategic planning, fire services, consumer protection, refuse disposal, social services and libraries.

=== Westminster Constituency ===
Fulking civil parish is in the Arundel and South Downs constituency.

== Sport ==
Fulking is the home of the Preston Nomads Cricket Club. The club was founded in 1927 Preston, Brighton. When it was founded, the club did not have its own ground; hence the ‘Nomads’ element of the name. It played on whatever council-run pitches were available. in 1937, Spenta (Spen) Cama, one of the founding members of the club, bought some fields in Fulking which formed the nucleus of the club's current ground. Further land purchases in 1955 and 1991 extended the club's grounds to their current size. The club's pavilion was opened in 1982. Preston Nomads Cricket Club was a founder member of the Sussex Cricket League in 1971.

The club runs four men's Saturday League teams and one on Sundays. The club has a junior section and runs a coaching programme.

== In culture ==
In The Meaning of Liff by Douglas Adams and John Lloyd "Fulking" is given the definition "pretending not to be in when the carol singers come round."

== Gallery ==
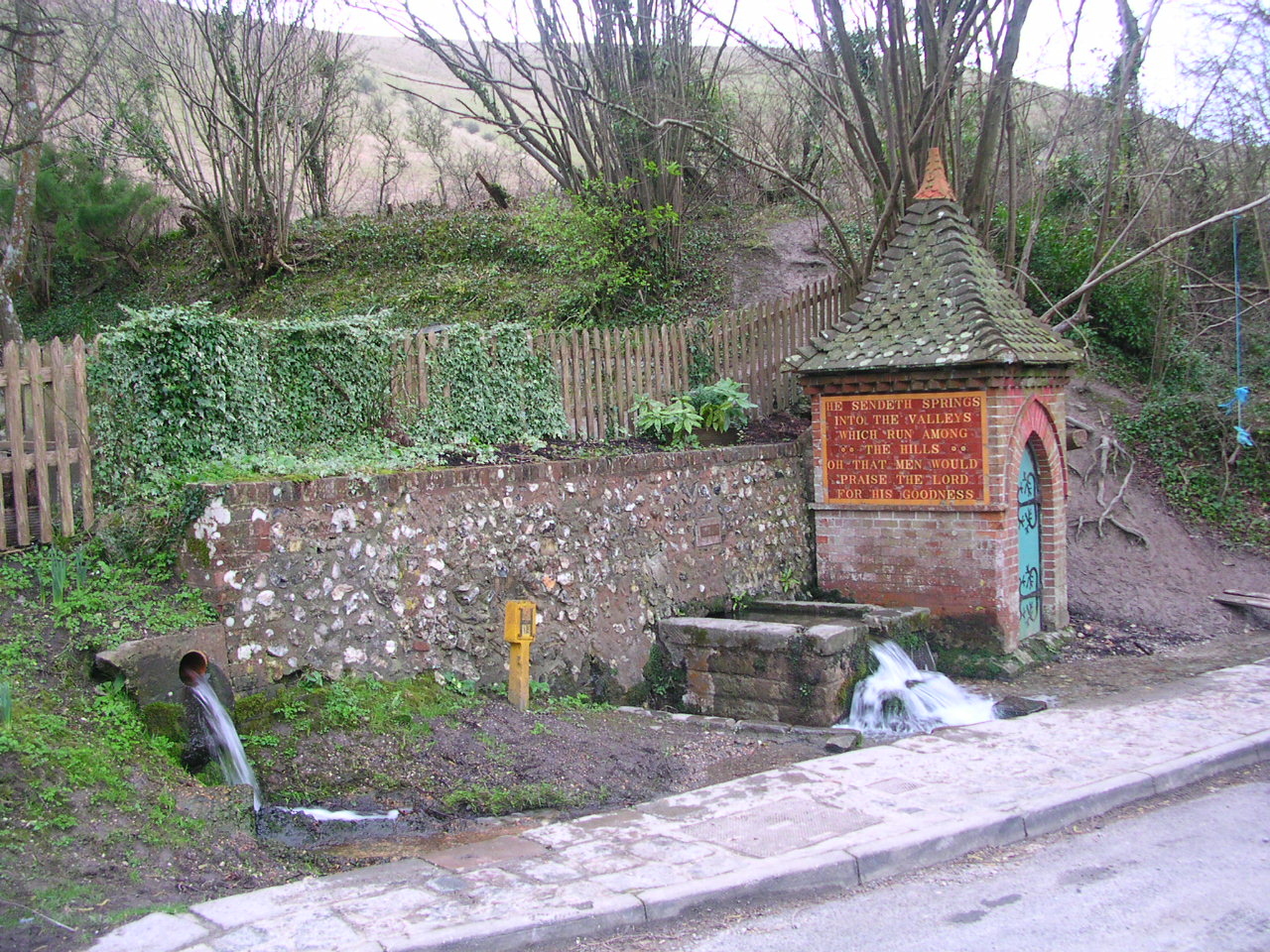
Fulking Spring

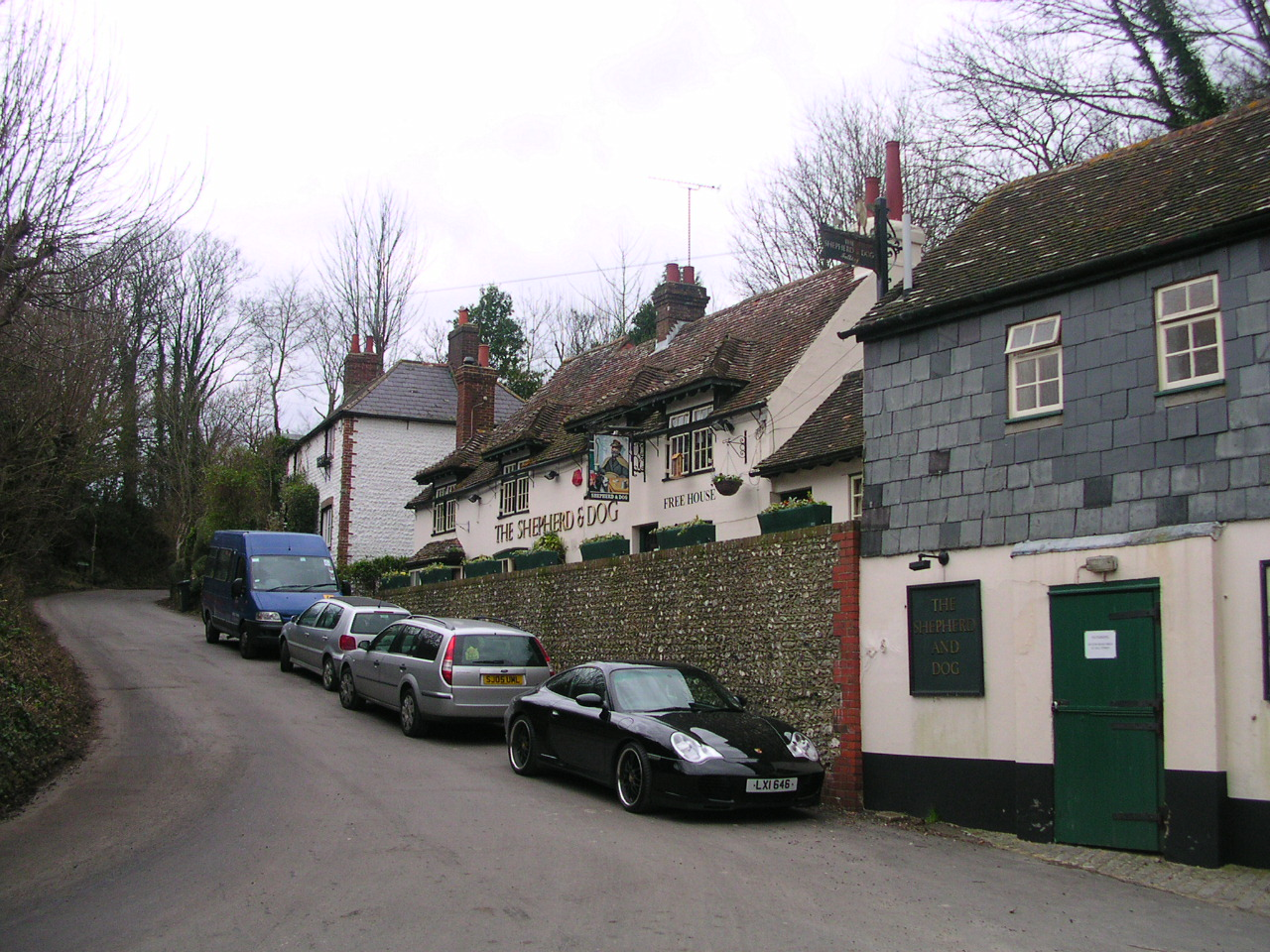
The Shepherd and Dog pub by Fulking

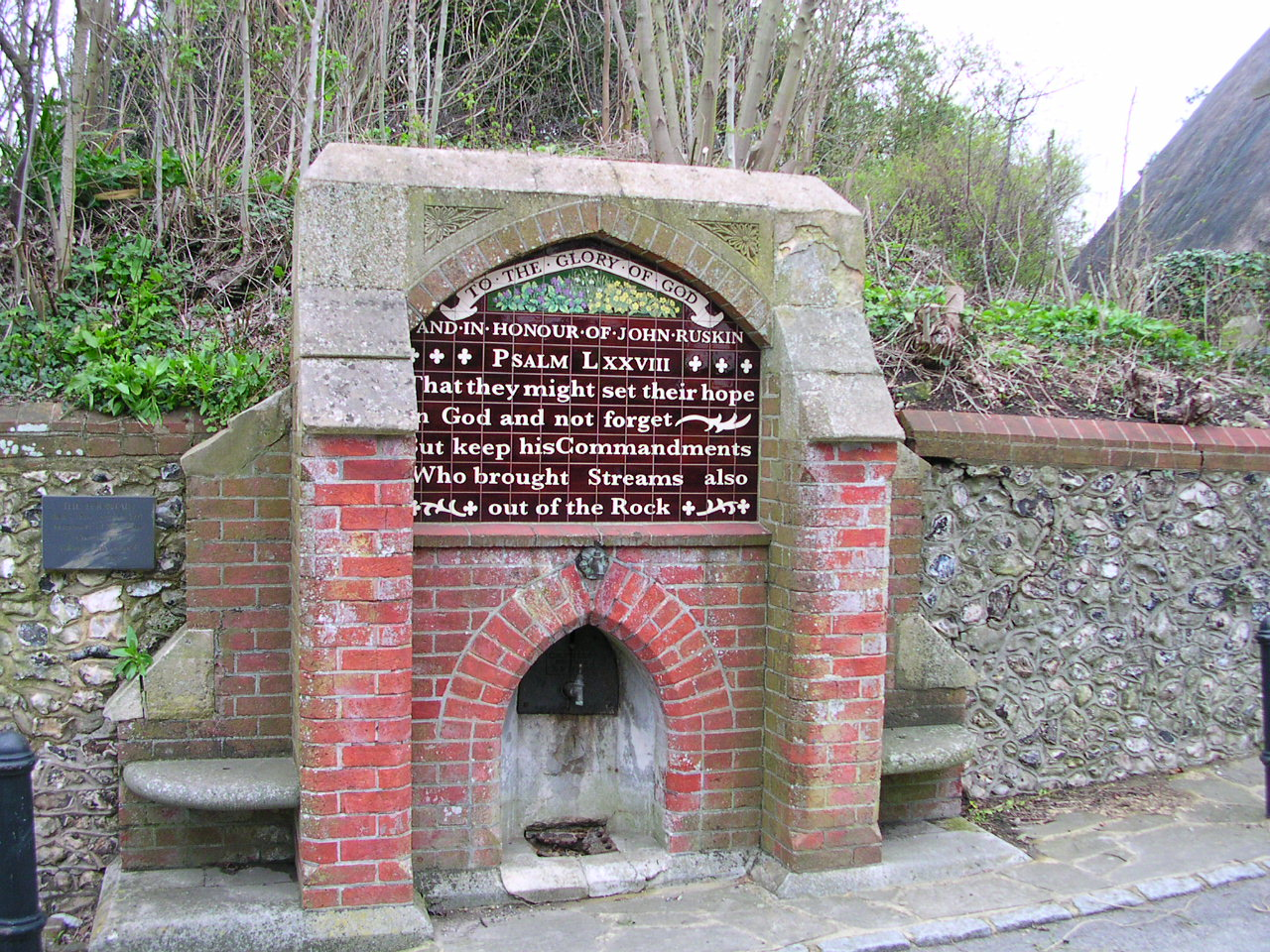
John Ruskin tap

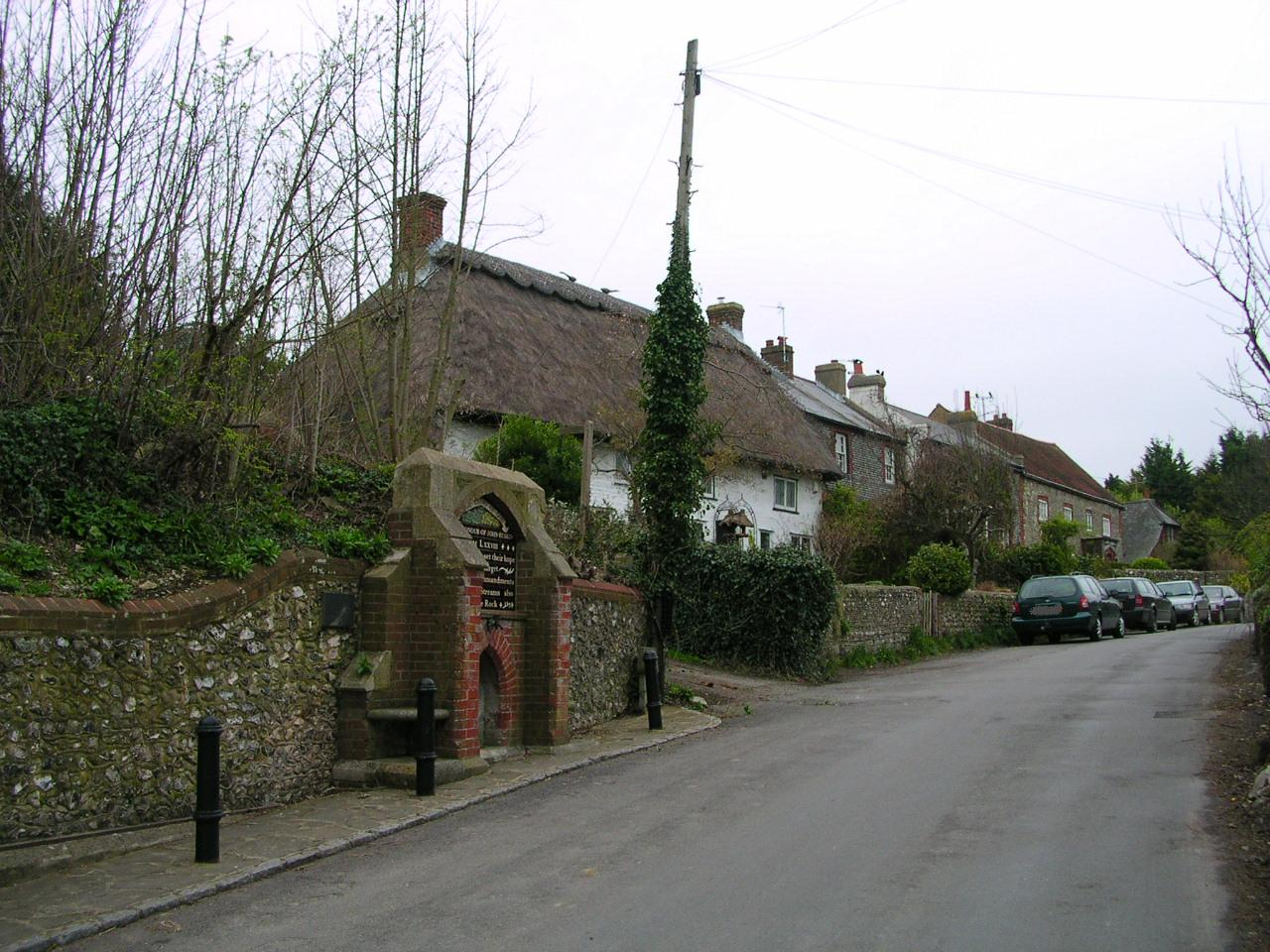
Fulking village

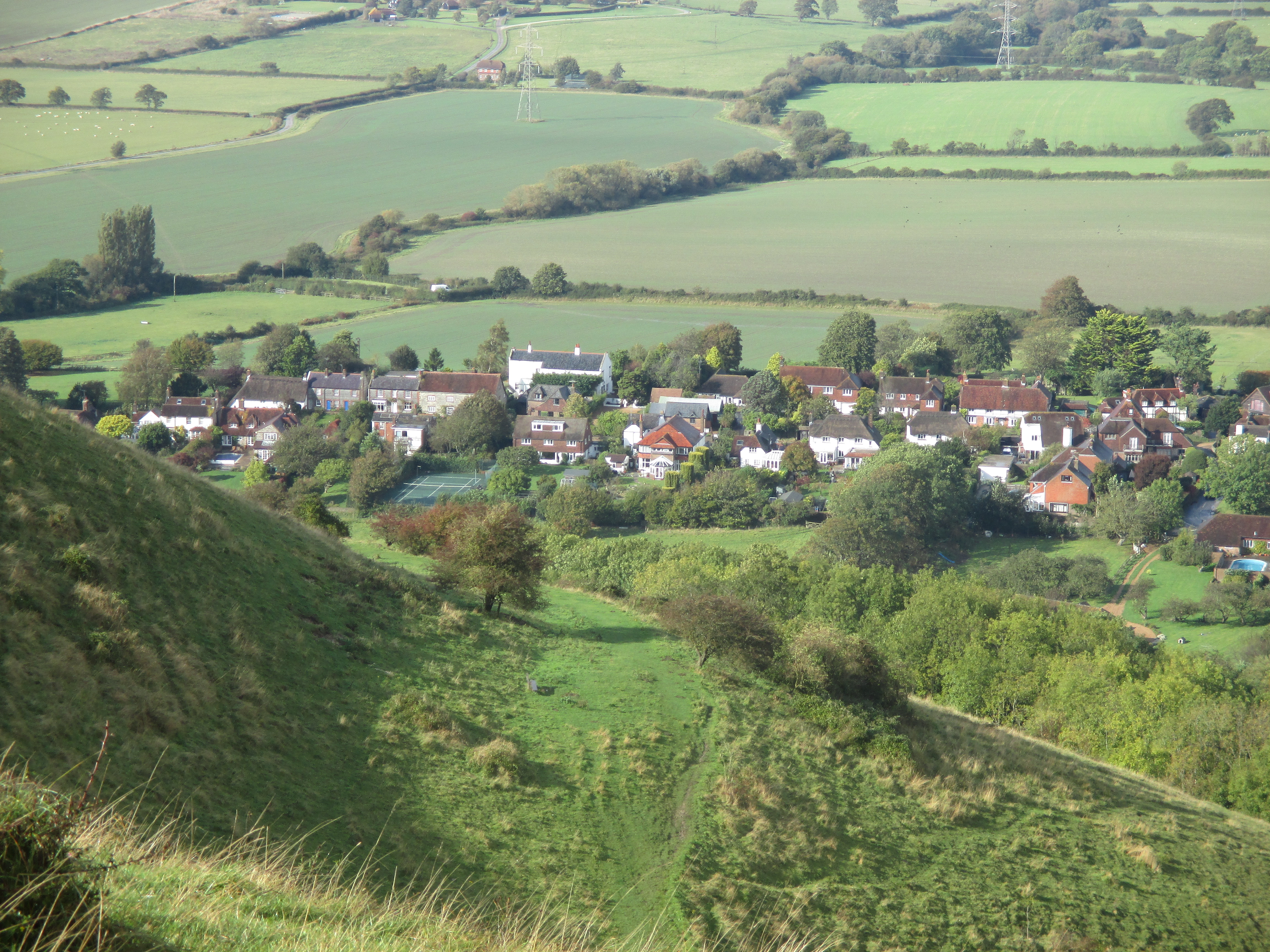
The village from the South Downs

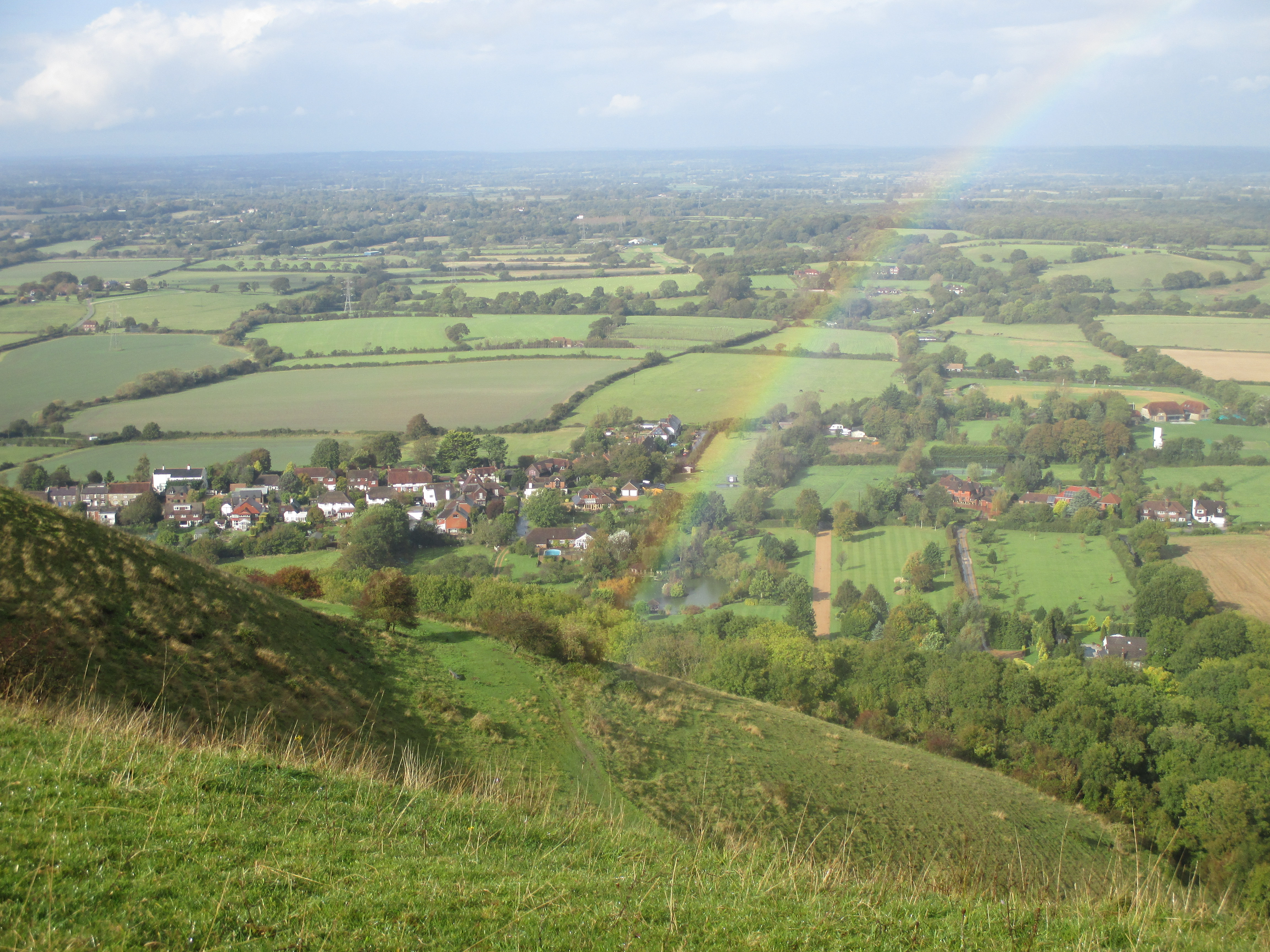
The village in context

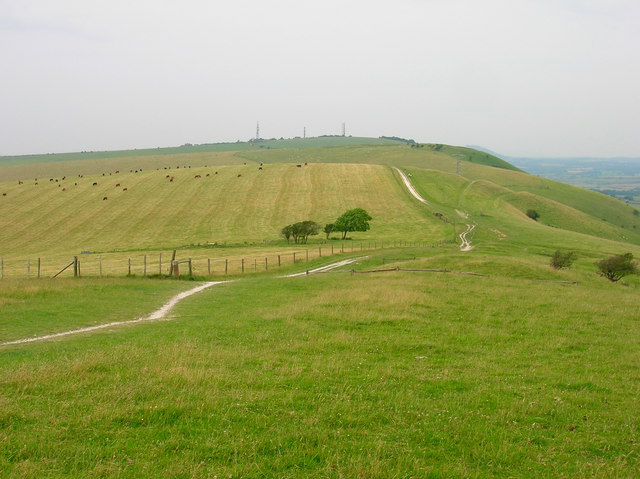
The South Downs Way

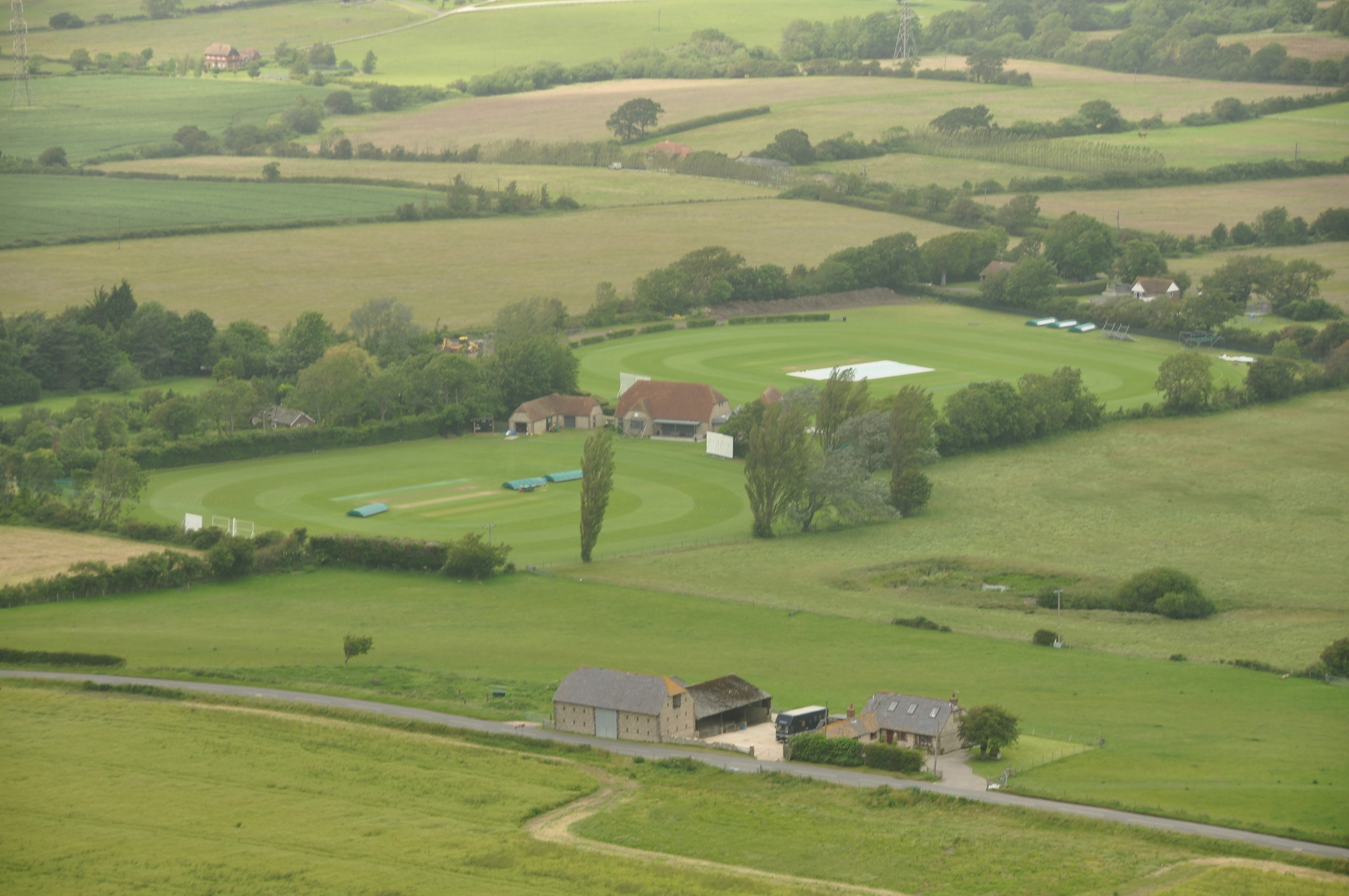
Preston Nomads Cricket Club is based in Fulking
