= Field pansy =

Field pansy is a common name for several plants and may refer to:

- Viola arvensis, also called the European field pansy
- Viola rafinesquei, alternatively named Viola bicolor, also called the American field pansy
