= Poynings =

Village and civil parish in West Sussex, England

Coordinates: 50.89443°N 0.20351°W

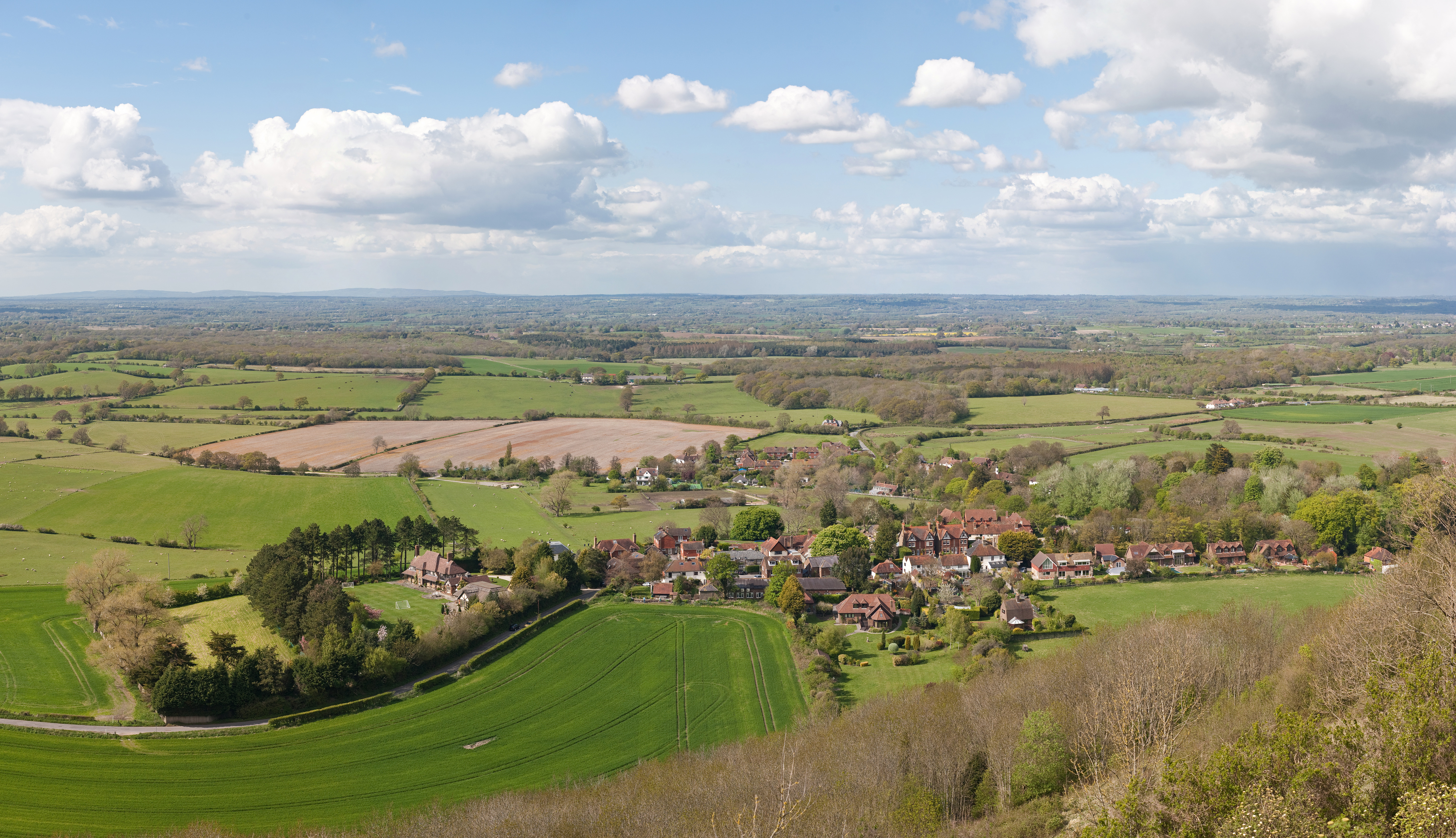
- Poynings from the South Downs

- Location within West Sussex
- Area: 6.66 km^{2} (2.57 sq mi)
- Population: 287 2001 Census; 432 (2011 Census)
  - Density: 43/km^{2} (110/sq mi)
- OS grid reference: TQ264120
  - London: 42 miles (68 km) N
- Civil parish: Poynings
- District: Mid Sussex
- Shire county: West Sussex
- Region: South East
- Country: England
- Sovereign state: United Kingdom
- Post town: BRIGHTON
- Postcode district: BN45
- Dialling code: 01273
- Police: Sussex
- Fire: West Sussex
- Ambulance: South East Coast
- UK Parliament: Arundel and South Downs
- Website: Poynings village

Poynings (/ˈpɔɪnɪŋz/ or locally /ˈpʌnɪŋz/) is a village and civil parish in the Mid Sussex District of West Sussex, England. The parish lies wholly with the South Downs National Park. To its south is Brighton and Hove, to its west is Fulking parish, to its east is Newtimber parish and to its north is Albourne parish. The planning authority for Poynings is the South Downs National Park Authority (SDNPA), the statutory planning authority for the National Park area.

The village is located on the north side of the South Downs near Devil's Dyke, five miles (8 km) north-west of Brighton. The civil parish covers an area of 665.5 hectares (1,644 acres) and had a population of 287 at the 2001 census, including Newtimber, increasing to 432 at the 2011 census. The area was known as "Puningas" in 960 AD. Some have suggested the name came from "sons of Puna" or "people of Puna", Puna being the nickname of a hammer-wielding Saxon leader. Others have suggested it means "the people of the pond".

The downland scarp, which includes the Fulking and Perching bostals (paths), is part of the Beeding Hill to Newtimber Hill designated Site of Special Scientific Interest.

== Listed Buildings and Scheduled Monuments ==
Poynings civil parish contains ten listed buildings. Of these, one is Grade I and the remaining nine are Grade II. The parish contains four scheduled monuments.

=== Listed buildings ===
==== Grade I listed buildings ====
- The Parish Church of the Holy Trinity (List Entry Number 1285135) – see above.

=== Scheduled monuments ===
- Bowl barrow on Scabes Castle (List Entry Number 1014950), lying on the parish boundary between Poynings and Fulking, an originally circular funerary monument, now a roughly oval mound, having been levelled by modern ploughing on its eastern side.
- Devil's Dyke hillfort (List Entry Number 1014953), a large univallate hillfort dating to the Iron Age, situated on a chalk spur which forms part of the Sussex Downs.
- Post-medieval stock enclosure at Devil's Dyke (List Entry Number 1014954), which survives as a north east-south west aligned, rectangular earthwork. It was used for the stalling of working oxen and as winter housing for fatstock cattle. Before excavation in 1908, it was assumed to be a burial mound.
- Romano-British farmstead 480m north west of Devil's Dyke Cottages (List Entry Number 1017649), which survives largely in buried form and is visible as an area of hollows and uneven ground.

== Notable buildings and areas ==
Map

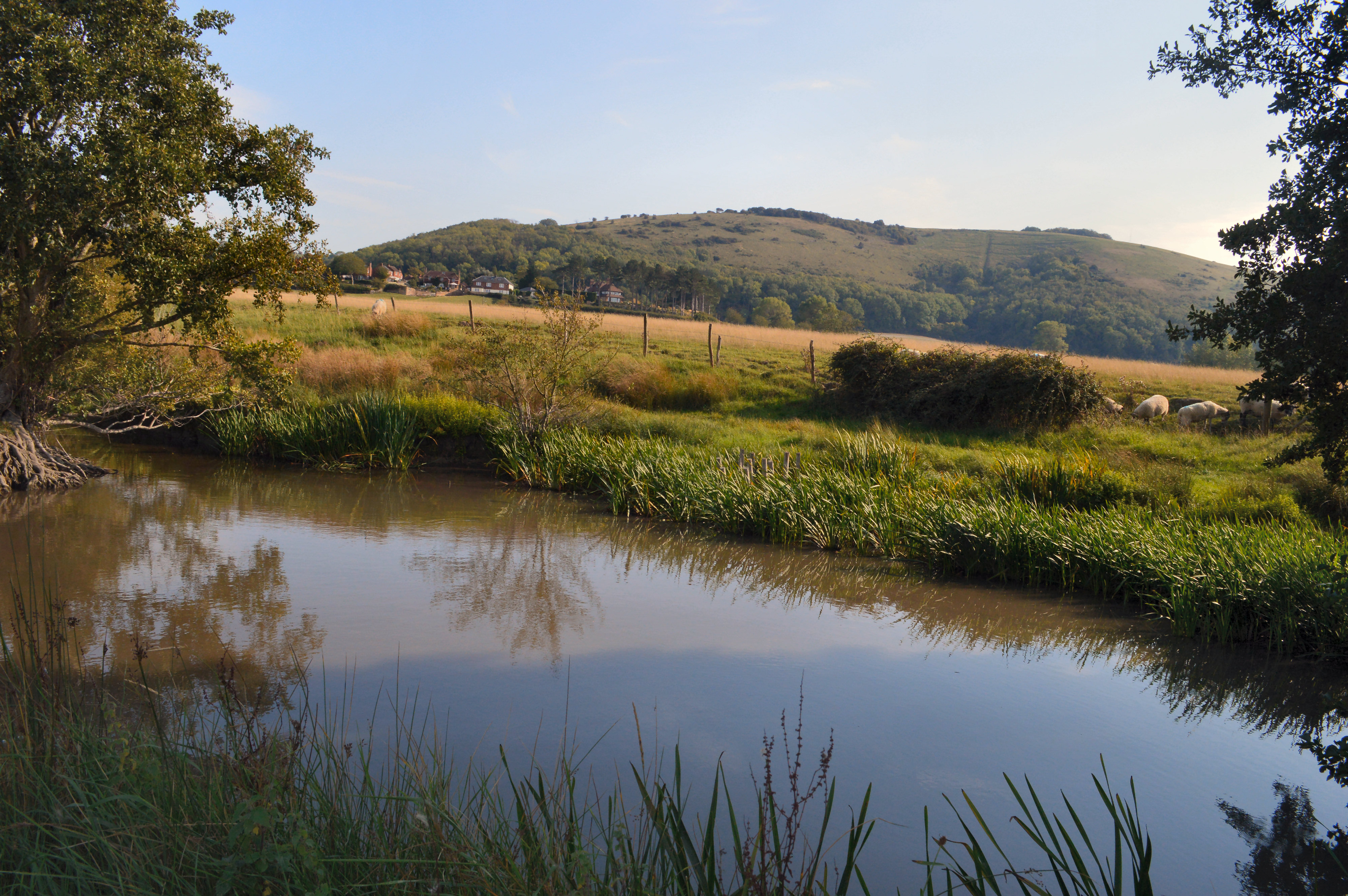
Poynings, view towards Devils Dyke from the pond

Poynings is a little village on the north side of the Downs. Its church is cathedral-like and comparable to Alfriston church without the spire. There is a public house, the Royal Oak, in the village which is a popular stop off point for walkers ascending the scarp slope. Also of note are the large ponds fed from the Downs, including the Poynings springhead (TQ 267 116), which has a little pumping station hidden in a lush gill wood and the old mill pond (TQ 265 117), both to the southeast of the village.

=== Holy Trinity Church ===
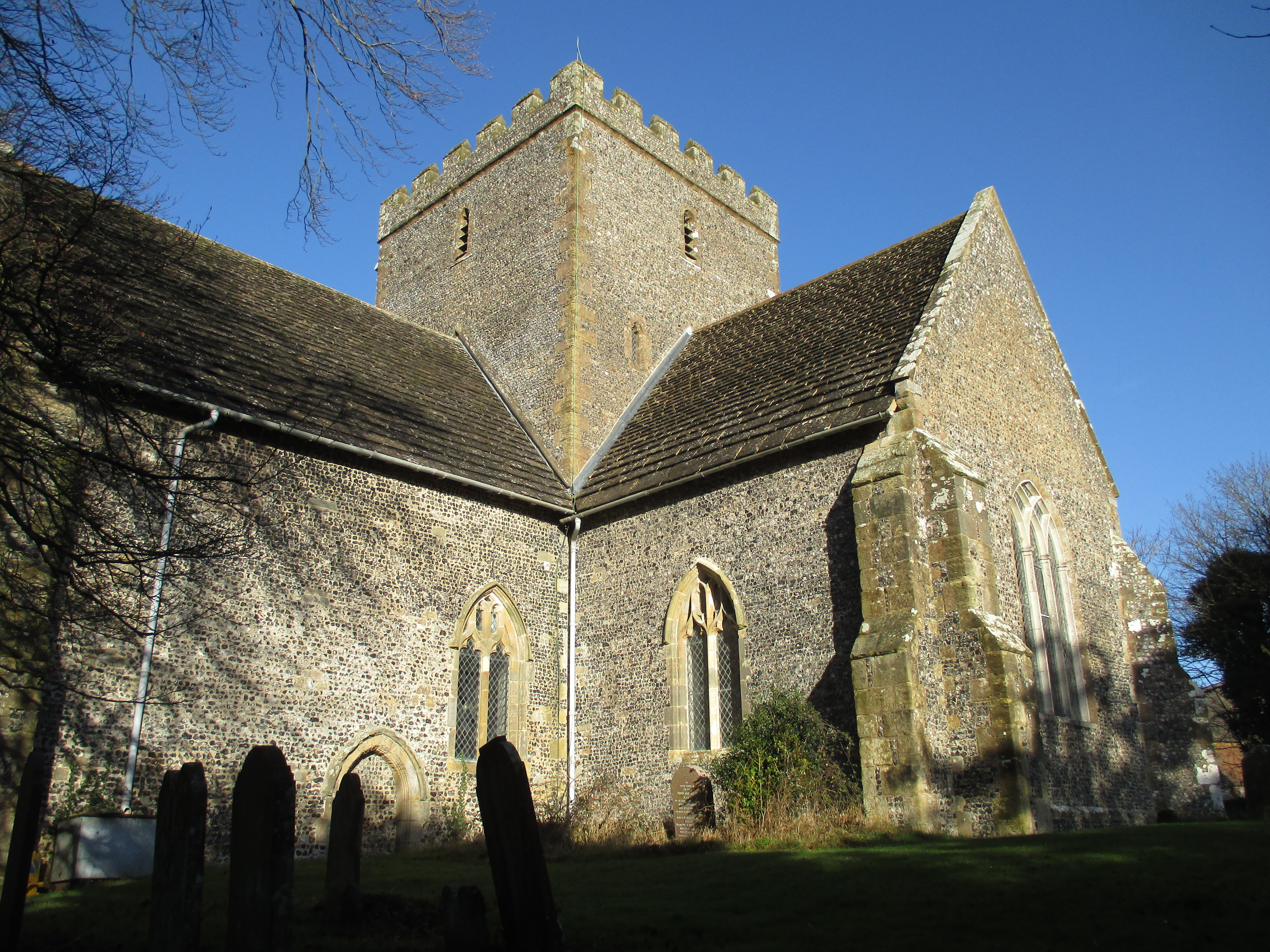
Poynings church from south-west

Holy Trinity Church (TQ 264 120) is Poynings’ parish church, located at the east end of the village, on The Street.. The church is in the Church of England Diocese of Chichester, Archdeaconry of Horsham.

The church is a Grade I listed building, described in the National Heritage List for England as 'One of the finest village medieval churches in Sussex' (List Entry Number 1285135, first listed 28 October 1957).

The church was in the Domesday book but it was rebuilt by the de Poynings family in 1370. Its similarity to Alfriston church have left some people speculating that it had the same master mason architect. The church has an echoing empty interior and scant signs of the wealth of the donor family. There are only the smallest fragments of fourteenth century glass surviving in the plain glass windows. With its big, centralised, empty interior it has been noted that it feels more like a grand old mosque than the usual homely busy-ness of many medieval parish churches.

==== Cora's Corner ====
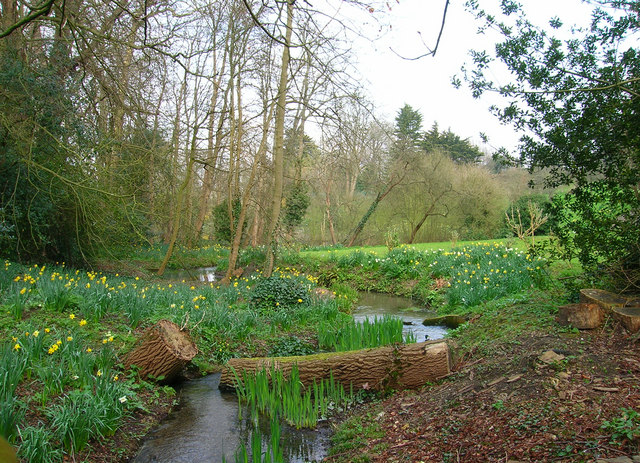
View of Poynings Stream from Cora's Walk

In the village opposite Holy Trinity Church there is a small sheltered memorial called Cora's Corner, which pays tribute to a former resident of Poynings; two benches in the shelter, Judy's Seat and Merrilee's Seat, are tributes to Cora's two daughters. The road linking Cora's Corner to the Royal Oak is called Cora's Walk.

=== The Poynings Crossways Woods ===
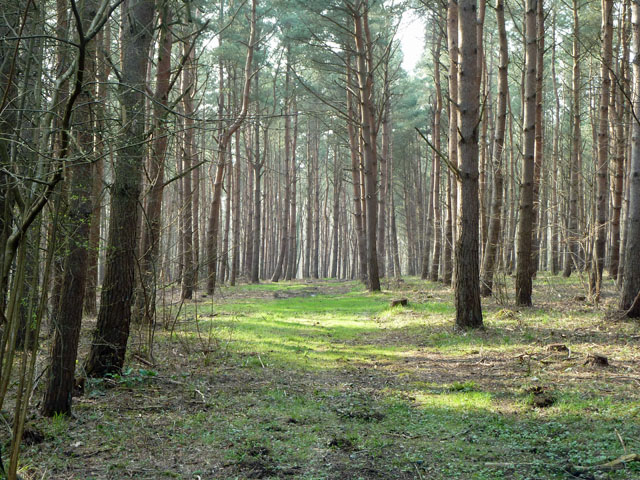
Shaves Wood

Within the parish of Poynings there are three ancient woods, which include Park, Stonestaples and Pondtail Wood. In the neighbouring parishes there are others which are part of the Poynings Crossways (TQ 255 141) Woods' cluster. These include Shaves Wood (TQ 255 145), Holmbush Wood (grid reference tq 247 143), West Wood (TQ 242 149), East Wood (TQ 249 151) and Newtimber Wood (TQ 266 134). Except Stonestaple which sits on Weald Clay, the woods all sit on Gault Clay and are all extremely biodiverse, containing many different ancient woodland indicator plants (up to twenty-five in each wood) including anemones, primroses, bluebells and wild orchids. In Holmbush Wood there is still a population of scarce and fairy-like giant lacewing.

Unfortunately, as many areas of the natural world, the woods are under constant threat from development and have lost many of their most precious species. The woods were once famous for their moths and butterflies, including wood white, high brown fritillary, black-veined white (now extinct in the UK) and the Duke of Burgundy. Change in land management means none of them live there now. The last Duke of Burgundy butterfly was seen in 1985 when a good proportion of Shaves Wood was bulldozed for pasture. Small pearl-bordered and pearl-bordered were also lost. In 2016 a new owner illegally felled hundreds of tree in Pondtail Wood before being ordered to stop by the council. The wood has since been sold to a more responsible owner in 2017.

==== Stonestaples Wood ====
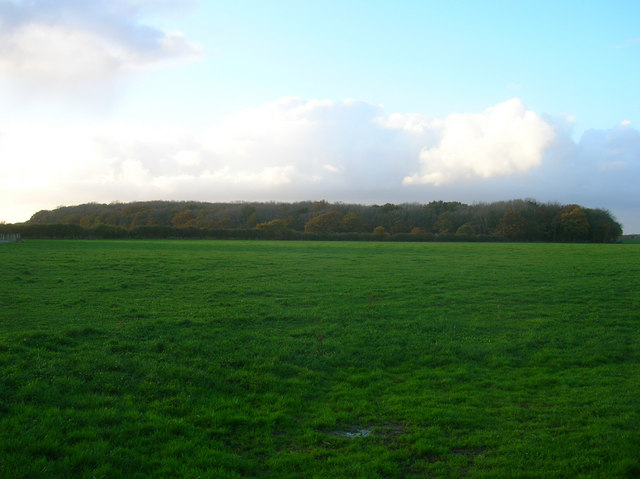
Stonestaples Wood

Stonestaples Wood (TQ 252 135) is in the centre of the Poynings parish. It is the only one of the Poynings Crossways woods that sits on the Wealden Clay. It must have once joined to the other woods, but the intervening ground to its east is fertile Lower Greensand, and so was farmed and ploughed centuries ago. The wood is rich in fungi, often colourful, and has big old hornbeam stools under an ash canopy, over anemones, primroses, bluebells and orchids. In the centre of the wood is a paintballing location.

==== Park Wood ====
Park Wood (TQ 262 135) is to the east of the parish and next to Newtimber Wood. In medieval times formed part of the de Poynings family deer park, and may have been much more open. The ancient deer park bank forms a prominent boundary between Park and Newtimber Wood. After that, it was likely managed as coppice with standards until the last century, when much of it was coniferised, particularly with cypress. The northern section partly retains its hornbeam coppice structure, over plentiful bluebells and is botanically rich. It is used as a scout camp. . The wood is currently being split and sold into fragments for large sums to new private owners, in a controversial process known as 'woodlotting'.

==== Pondtail Wood ====
Pondtail Wood (TQ 261 144) is at the north of the parish and is attached to Shaves Wood in the neighbouring parish of Albourne. The wood has a mixture of intact hazel coppice with very tall, clean oak standards at its east end, and heavy pine planting elsewhere. There may be as many as twenty three woodland indicator plants in the area. In 2016, the wood was sold to a new owner who started to bulldoze part of the centre of the wood and laid hardcore upon it, despite the binding legal requirements for permission for such felling. Demonstrators marched to the site, and several intrepid campaigners worked all one night to lift some of the hard core and dump it at the site entrance. The council intervened and the owner fined. There is now a new owner who is committed to the wood's restoration.

=== Scarp and downland ===
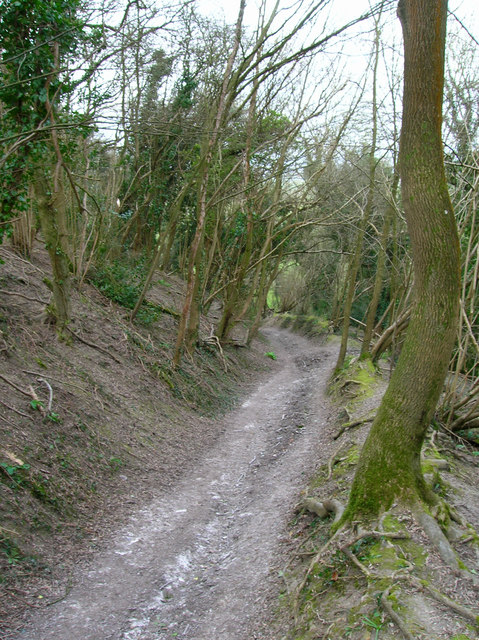
Bostal Road to Devil's Dyke

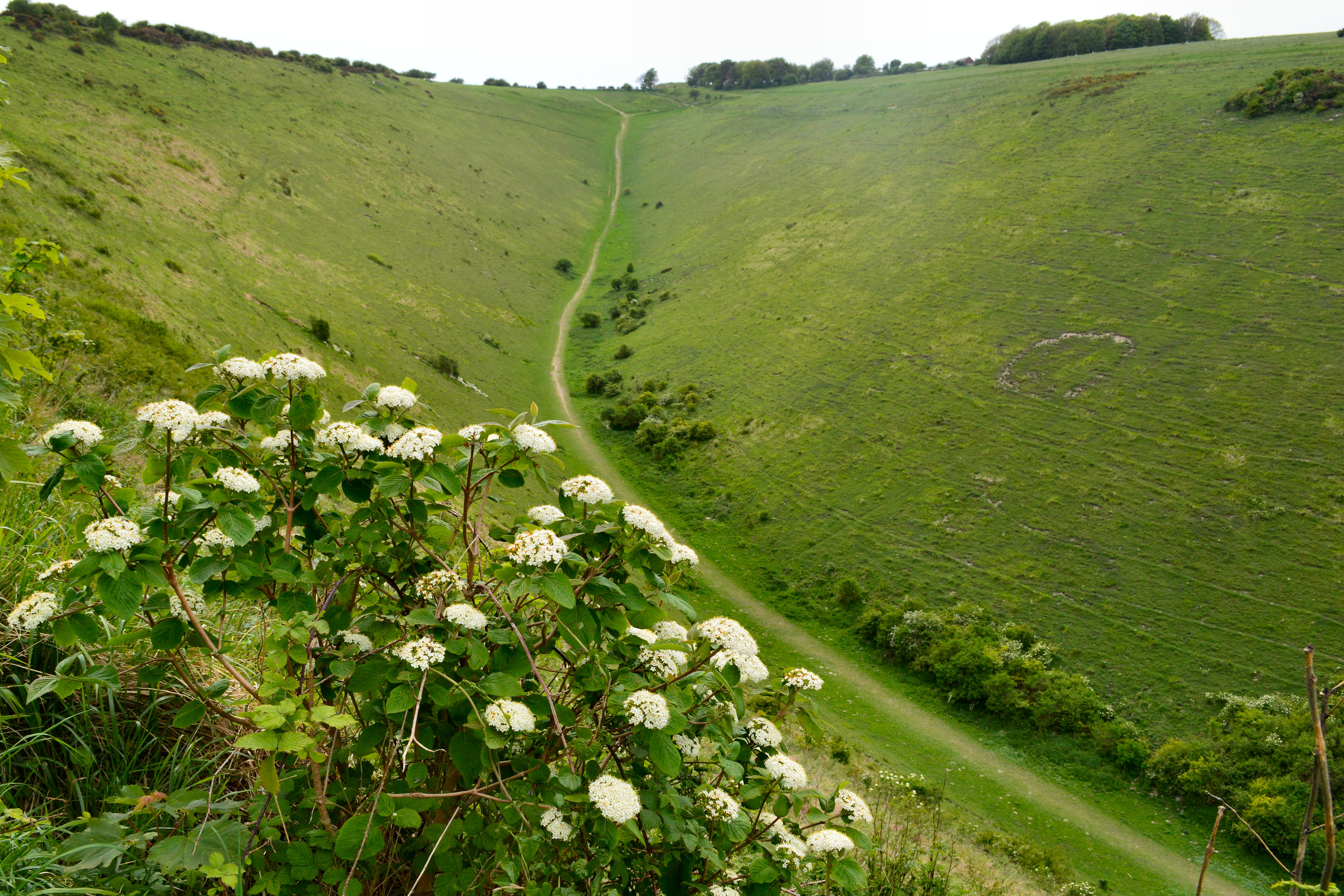
View of Devil's Dyke

To the south of Poynings is the scarp. On the eastern base of slope (TQ 263 115) is an old hazel coppice and spring bluebells.

There are a number of ancient bostal paths going up the scarp. The most varied and interesting route is The Bostal Road, a bridlepath, which curves through the woods and at its top passes the Iron Age ramparts above the Dyke Valley. The Wickhurst Bostal starts at Wickhurst Barns, passes a tiny chalk quarry (TQ 255 110) with a Victorian limekiln still intact, and tops at the junction with another bostal down to Fulking. Another path, which was called the Butter Track two centuries ago, takes you steeply up the scarp to the Dyke Pub.

The ancient terrace way (now a bridleway) that tracks down and across the south slope of the Dyke Valley is probably part of the Roman route starting at Southwick, on the coast, and joining the Roman road now called the Greensand Way south of Hurstpierpoint.

The Devil's Dyke Farm's barns and cottages were built around 1950 and are the very last generation of farm buildings to be built with relatively traditional uses and proportions.

==== Devil's Dyke ====
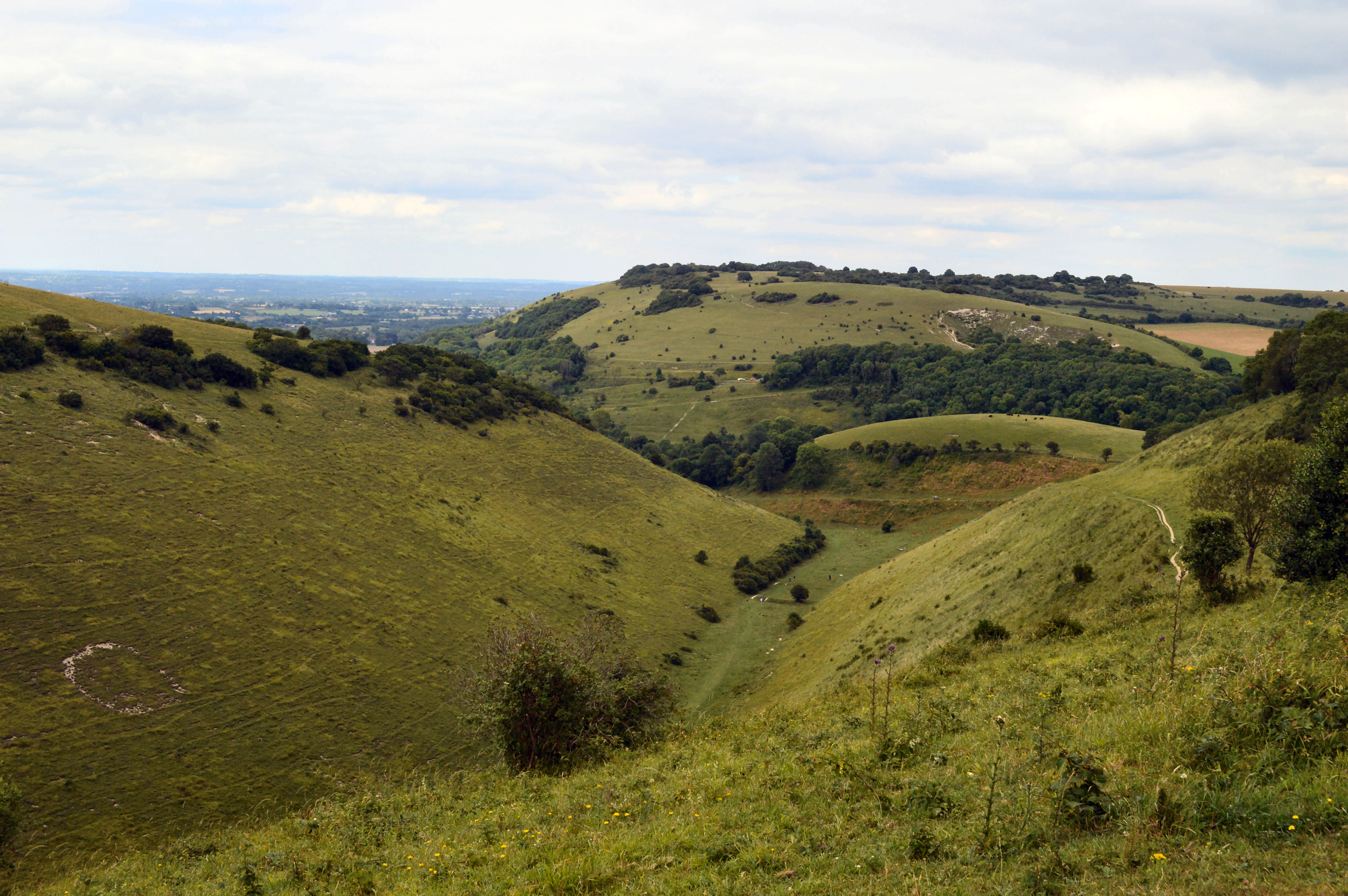
Devil's Dyke, Sussex, from South Downs Way

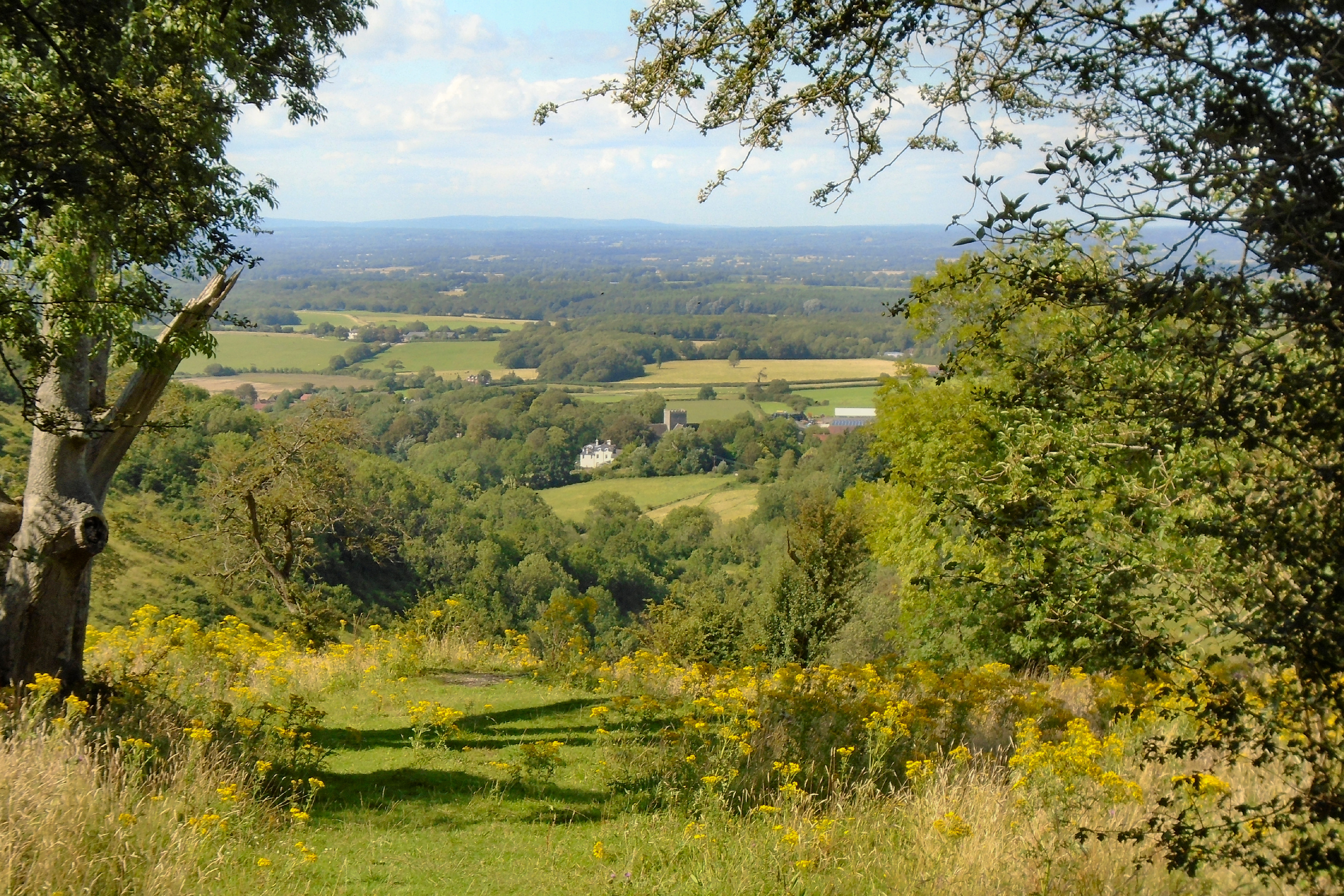
View from Devil's Dyke towards Poynings

At the top of the scarp slope is the very special Devil's Dyke (TQ 260 110). It Is a 300 feet (91 m) deep valley carved by water running off the Downs during the last Ice Age over freeze-thaw cycles. Over the last two centuries, there have been an amusement park and pleasure gardens, a hotel, three railways (the railway up from Hove; a funicular railway down the north scarp slope; and a cable car across the Dyke Valley), golf courses, and a zoo. Despite this, it still has the well preserved ramparts of an Iron Age hill fort and much of its special biodiversity has been retained.

==== The Devil’s Punch Bowl ====
The Devil's Punch Bowl is the little rounded hill between Saddlescombe and the mouth of the Dyke Valley. It is a peaceful place and its steep northern slopes are covered in cowslips in spring and fragrant orchid in early summer.

==== Adder Bottom ====
Adder Bottom (TQ 253 101) has the lynchet lines of an Iron Age field system visible in good evening light. There is prehistoric bowl barrow (TQ 252 101) called Scabes Castle which marks the corner of the Poynings and Fulking parishand the Brighton boundary. It is now only detectable by a slight rise in the fence line as it crosses the ploughed-out mound.

== See also ==
- List of Stewards of the Manor of Poynings
