= Edburton =

Village in West Sussex, England

Coordinates: 50.88903°N 0.24796°W

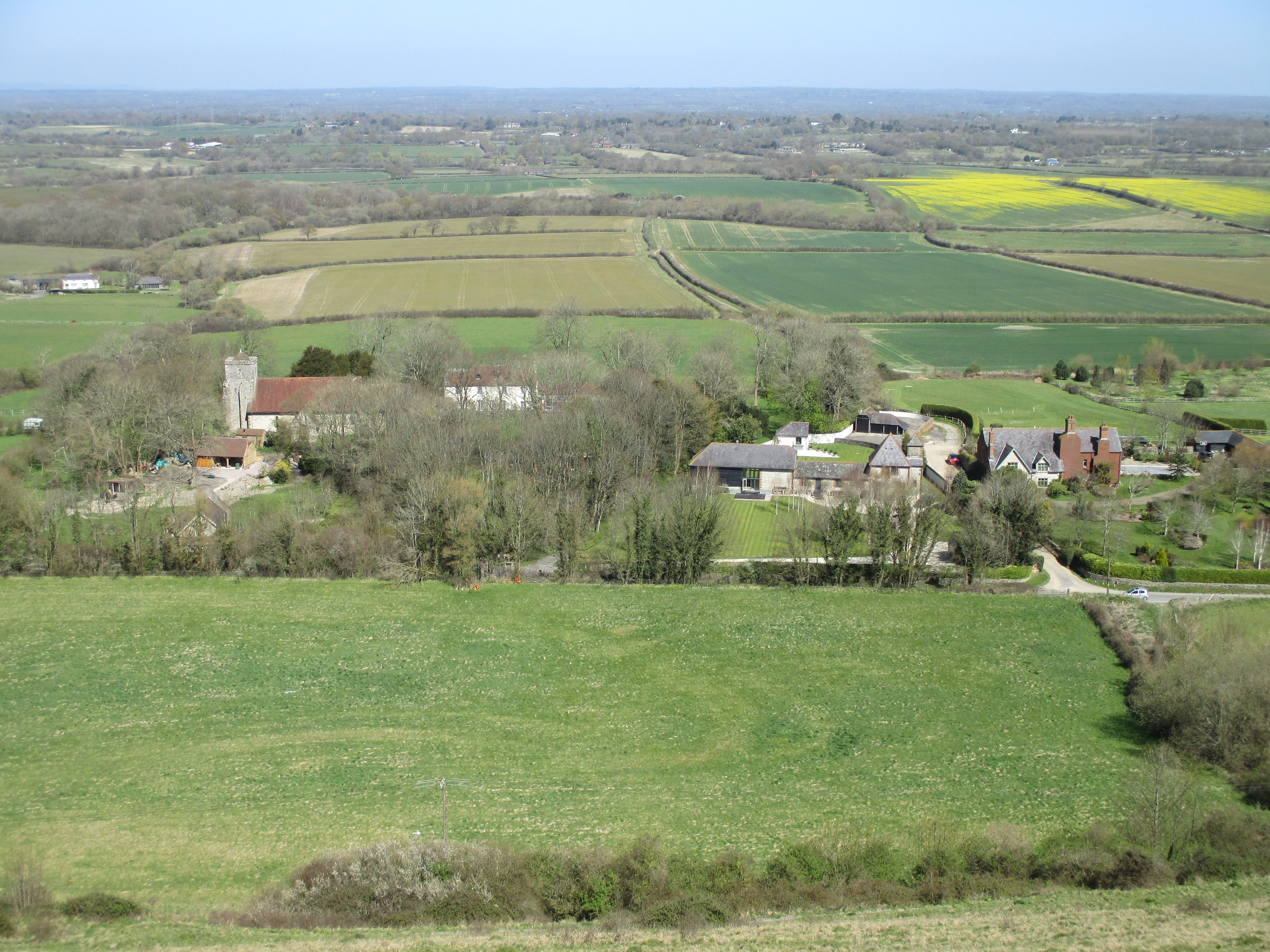
- Edburton seen from the South Downs

- Location within West Sussex
- OS grid reference: TQ233114
- Civil parish: Upper Beeding
- District: Horsham
- Shire county: West Sussex
- Region: South East
- Country: England
- Sovereign state: United Kingdom
- Post town: HENFIELD
- Postcode district: BN5
- Dialling code: 01903
- Police: Sussex
- Fire: West Sussex
- Ambulance: South East Coast
- UK Parliament: Arundel and South Downs

Edburton is a small village and former civil parish, now in the parish of Upper Beeding, in the Horsham district, in the county of West Sussex, England. It is on the road from Upper Beeding to Fulking. In 1931 the parish had a population of 83. On 1 April 1933 the parish was abolished and merged with Upper Beeding.

== History ==
The village's name means Ēadburg's tūn, or settlement. Ēadburg is a woman's name, and it is sometimes claimed that it refers to Edburga of Winchester, a granddaughter of King Alfred the Great and daughter of his successor King Edward the Elder. In the Sussex dialect the village was called Aburton, as can be seen from the name of Aburton Farm, a farmstead now converted to housing.

The church supposedly founded by this Edburga c. 940 at Edburton collapsed and was rebuilt in the late twelfth century on the same foundations. This indicates that there was a substantial population living where there are only a few houses now. The situation at the foot of the north-facing South Downs escarpment provided a year-round supply of clean spring water from the chalk of the downs. The geology of Edburton varies. Farmers benefitted from the fertile and easily worked sandstones such as the Lower Greensands and the Grey Chalk of the Downs, but there are areas of sticky Gault Clay that are far more difficult to work and, as is often true in the Sussex Weald, these are where the best ancient woodlands can still be found.

== Edburton Stream to Edburton Sands barns and brooks ==
The Edburton Stream is a chalk stream that runs by Edburton church to Edburton Sand barns and brooks (TQ233124). Lapwing traditionally breed in the fields around the stream. The brooks themselves are a wild place around a mile North of Edburton church with sedge and reed fen, willow carr, and fine oaks on the bank. There is a huge three-span girth pollard crack willow on the waterside. The fen has ragged-robin, greater tussock sedge, wood club rush, common sedge and both lesser and greater pond sedges. Downstream towards Catlands Farm are at least seven veteran crack and white willows. The area can support nightingale, cuckoos and other warblers.

== St Andrew's, Edburton parish church ==
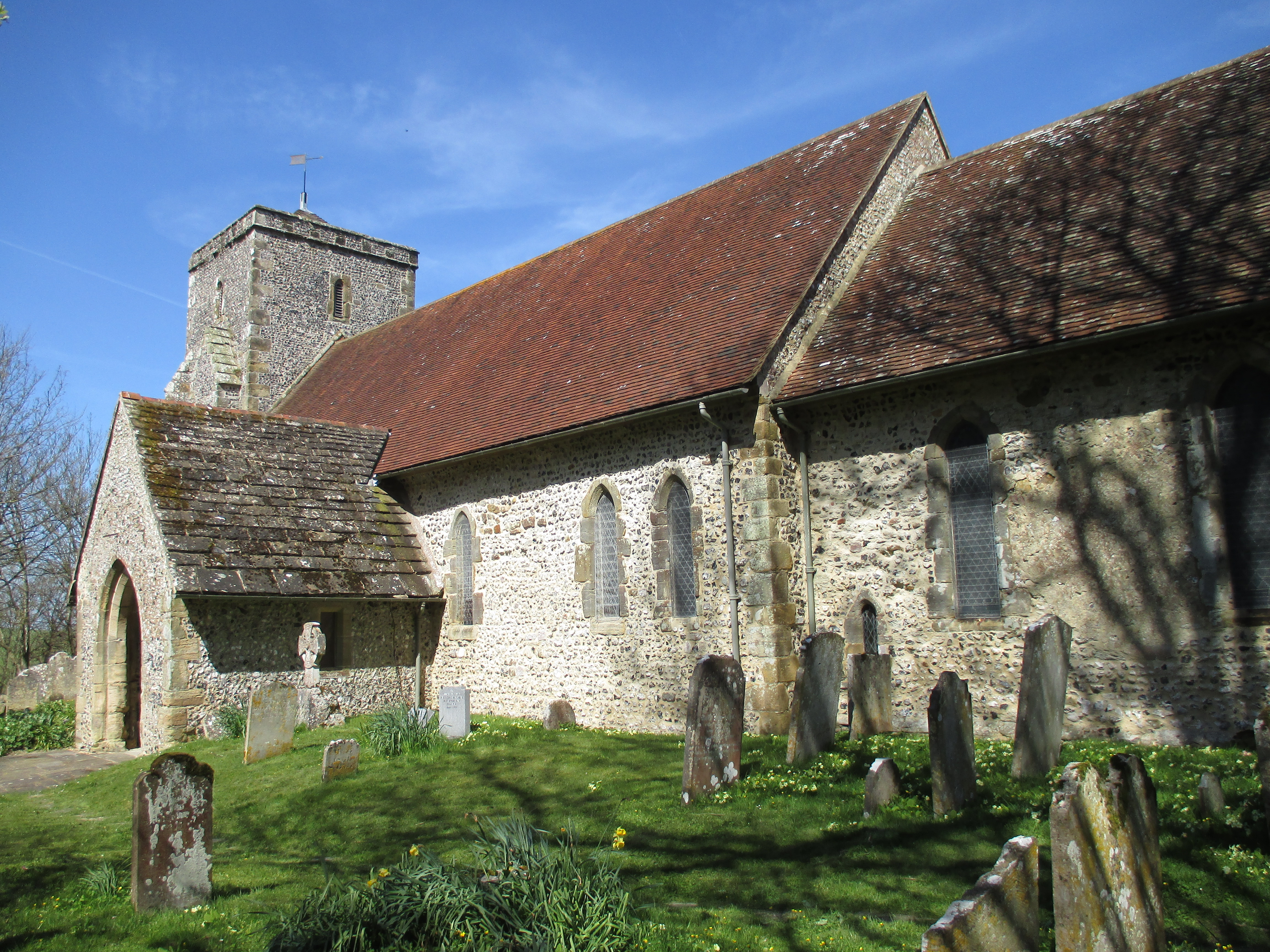

The Anglican parish church dedicated to St. Andrew was rebuilt in the late twelfth century, in late Norman and Early English style, beginning with the nave and finishing with the tower. The interior stone came from Caen in Normandy. The well-proportioned tower is mainly of flint. There is an unusual lead font with a raisable conical wooden cover. A round stone sink with Anglo-Saxon carving, which was found in the churchyard, is believed to be the piscina of the original Anglo-Saxon church. There are three mass-clocks or sundials carved into the stone on the south side of the church. These originally had a projecting metal rod called a gnomon or style to cast a shadow, and were used to divide up the day before clocks existed. A fourth mass-clock on the north side of the church sees no sunshine and is upside down, showing that the stone was reused from the earlier church, which was built c. 940. On either side of the altar are two confession windows used by Franciscan friars to hear confessions when they were forbidden to hear confessions in church and people knelt outside the windows. The pulpit and altar rails were given by Archbishop Laud. Stained glass windows are by James Powell and Sons and the East window was made by the Royal Bavarian Stained Glass Manufactory, Munich.

From 1705 to 1716, the rector of St. Andrew's was George Keith, a Scottish-born Presbyterian convert to Quakerism who once served as a leading minister of the Philadelphia Monthly Meeting in Pennsylvania during the late 1680s and early 1690s. Keith's attacks on the political and religious authority of the colony's ruling Quakers initiated a serious schism within Pennsylvania Quakerism during that time. In 1693, after Keith was expelled from the Society of Friends, he published an antislavery tract excoriating Pennsylvania Friends for their involvement in slavery. Keith converted to Anglicanism in 1700 and returned to North America as the first missionary for the Society for the Propagation of the Gospel in Foreign Parts in 1702–1704. Having travelled the world as a renowned theologian and missionary, Keith served out the remainder of his years as the rector of St. Andrew's in Edburton, although in his final six years of life he was so sick he often had to be carried to the church to perform his duties.
