= List of works by R. H. Carpenter =

Richard Herbert Carpenter (1841–93) (often known as R. H. Carpenter) was an English architect. He was the son of Richard Cromwell Carpenter, who was also an architect, and was educated at Charterhouse School. In 1855, when he was aged 14, his father died, and the practice was taken over by William Slater, a former pupil in the practice. When Carpenter's education was complete, he joined Slater as an apprentice. He became Slater's partner in 1863 and, after Slater's death in 1872, he took his assistant, Benjamin Ingelow, into partnership. Carpenter's major works were churches in Gothic Revival style. He also restored churches, built new schools, and carried out work on domestic properties. Carpenter died in London in 1893.

The list includes the major works in which Carpenter was involved. Those carried out in collaboration with Slater are denoted by †, and those with Ingelow by ¶.

== Key ==
Grade	Criteria
Grade I	Buildings of exceptional interest, sometimes considered to be internationally important.
Grade II*	Particularly important buildings of more than special interest.
Grade II	Buildings of national importance and special interest.

== Works ==
Name	Location	Photograph	Date	Notes	Grade
Chapel, Sherborne School ¶	Sherborne, Dorset; 50.9470°N 2.5174°W	—	1855	Two bays added to create a north aisle.	I
St Simon and St Jude's Church †	Earl Shilton, Leicestershire; 52.5796°N 1.3061°W		1855–56	Other than the 15th-century west tower, the church was completely rebuilt.	II*
St Leonard's Church †	Bridgnorth, Shropshire; 52.5371°N 2.4187°W		1860–73	The major reconstruction of a church damaged in the Civil War, the tower being rebuilt in 1870–73. The church is now redundant.	II*
Ardingly College †	Ardingly, West Sussex; 51.0408°N 0.0903°W		1864–83	A school built in phases, including a chapel.	II
St Mary's Church †	Goudhurst, Kent; 51.1137°N 0.4616°E		1865–70	Restoration of a church dating from the 13th century, the alterations being supervised by Ewan Christian.	I
Christ Church †	Bootle, Sefton, Merseyside; 53.4488°N 2.9828°W		1866	A new church.	II
St Mary Magdalene's Church †	Munster Square, Camden, Greater London; 51.5260°N 0.1425°W		1866–67	Alterations.	II*
Cathedral Church of Saint Andrew †	Honolulu, Hawaii		1867	A new cathedral, not completely finished until 1958.	—
St John the Baptist's Church †	Stapleton, Shropshire; 52.6357°N 2.7835°W		1867	Restoration of a church dating from the 12th century, which originally was in two storeys; included lengthening the chancel, adding the north vestry, and altering the interior.	II*
Chapel, Lancing College	Lancing, West Sussex; 50.8468°N 0.3024°W		1868	A chapel for the college in Gothic Revival style.	I
St Peter and St Paul's Church †	Mappowder, Dorset; 50.8528°N 2.3773°W		1868	Built the chancel and restored the church, which dates from the 15th century.	I
St John the Baptist's Church †	Hannington, Wiltshire; 51.6337°N 1.7390°W		1868–71	Rebuilding of a church dating from the 12th and 13th centuries, with a 15th-century tower.	II*
Denstone College ↑	Denstone, Staffordshire; 52.9601°N 1.8683°W		1868–73	A new school in Gothic Revival style.	II
St Peter and St John the Baptist's Church †	Wivelsfield, East Sussex; 50.9710°N 0.0951°W		1869	Added the north aisle.	II*
South West Classrooms, Sherborne School †	Sherborne, Dorset; 50.9468°N 2.5175°W	—	1869–70	New block for the school.	II
St Dunstan's Church ¶	Cheam, Sutton, Greater London; 51.3607°N 0.2163°W		1870	Added the spire to a church dating from 1862 to 1864.	II*
St Andrew's Church †	Cransley, Northamptonshire; 52.3805°N 0.7843°W		1870	Restoration of a church dating from the 14th century.	I
Cocking Old School †	Cocking, West Sussex; 50.9516°N 0.7502°W		1870	The former National School with adjacent schoolmaster's house, now a private residence.	II
Seacox Heath †	Ticehurst, East Sussex; 51.0494°N 0.4662°E	—	1871	A country house in the style of a French Châteaux.	II
St Peter's Church †	Church Lawford, Warwickshire; 52.3833°N 1.3356°W		1872	Rebuilding of a church dating from the 13th and 14th centuries.	II
St Leonard's Church †	Tortworth, Gloucestershire; 51.6380°N 2.4286°W		1872	Restoration of a church dating from the 12th century.	II*
St Peter's Church †	Alvescot, Oxfordshire; 51.7394°N 1.6048°W		1873	Restoration of a church dating from the 13th century.	II*
St Peter's Church	Wymondham, Leicestershire; 52.7588°N 0.7396°W		1873	Restoration of the nave of a church dating from the 13th century.	I
St Paul's Church	Brighton, East Sussex; 50.8221°N 0.1446°W		1873–75	Added a steeple to the church built by his father, R. C. Carpenter in 1846–48.	II*
Holdenby House †	Holdenby, Northamptonshire; 52.3036°N 0.9852°W		1873–75	Rebuilding of a house originally built for Sir Christopher Hatton in about 1583; it was extended in 1887–88 by W. E. Mills.	II*
St Peter's Church	Dunston, Lincolnshire; 53.1531°N 0.4122°W		1874–76	Restoration of a church dating from the 12th century.	II
St Margaret's Church	Luddington-in-the-Brook, Northamptonshire; 52.4398°N 0.3786°W		1875	Rebuilt the chancel of the church, which dates from the 13th century.	II*
St John the Evangelist's Church ¶	Newtimber, West Sussex; 50.9059°N 0.1932°W		1875	Restoration of a church dating mainly from the 18th century.	II*
St Nicholas' Church	Sandhurst, Kent; 51.0173°N 0.5515°E		1875	The church dating from the 13th century was restored and the chancel was largely rebuilt.	II*
Chapel, School of St Mary and St Ann ¶	Abbots Bromley, Staffordshire; 52.8175°N 1.87760°W		1875–81	A brick chapel with ashlar dressings, in Gothic Revival style.	II
Great School, Lancing College	Lancing, West Sussex; 50.8466°N 0.3045°W	—	1877–81	A school hall and classroom blocks in Gothic Revival style.	I
St Leonard's Church	Aldrington, Brighton and Hove, East Sussex; 50.8330°N 0.2038°W		1878	Building of a virtually new church on the site of a ruined medieval church.	II
St Michael's Church ¶	Child's Ercall, Shropshire; 52.8223°N 2.4976°W		1878–79	Rebuilt the chancel and north aisle, added a porch and a vestry and restored the interior of a church dating from the 13th century.	II*
Christ Church	Blacklands, Hastings, East Sussex; 50.8669°N 0.5778°E		1878–81	A new church in Gothic Revival style.	II*
St Oswald's Church ¶	Blankney, Lincolnshire; 53.1265°N 0.4051°W		1879–81	Restoration of a church dating from the 12th century.	II*
Chapel, Denstone College ¶	Denstone, Staffordshire; 52.9601°N 1.8679°W	—	1879–87	A chapel for Denstone College in Gothic Revival style, forming its east wing.	II
St Mary and St John's Church	Hardraw, North Yorkshire; 54.3169°N 2.2054°W		1879–81	A new church for the 1st Earl of Wharncliffe.	II
Ellesmere College ¶	Ellesmere, Shropshire; 52.8944°N 2.8932°W	—	1879–97	A new school founded by Nathaniel Woodard.	—
St James' Church ¶	Thurning, Northamptonshire; 52.4330°N 0.4044°W		1880	Restoration of a church dating from the 12th century.	II
St Peter and St Paul's Church ¶	Tring, Hertfordshire; 51.7945°N 0.6610°W		1880–82	Restoration of a church dating from the 13th century.	I
St Mary's Church ¶	Market Drayton, Shropshire; 52.9031°N 2.4833°W		1881–89	Rebuilding of the body of the church, and restoration of the tower.	II*
Tomb, Churchyard of Christ Church	Kilndown, Kent; 51.0907°N 0.4269°E	—	1882	Tomb in memory of A. J. Beresford-Hope and his wife.	II
All Saints Church ¶	Long Marston, Hertfordshire; 51.8340°N 0.7029°W		1882	A new church replacing a medieval church, whose tower stands nearby.	II
St Barnabas' Church ¶	Sutton, Greater London; 51.3647°N 0.1833°W	—	1882–84	A new church.	II
St Alphege with St Margaret's Church ¶	Canterbury, Kent; 51.2807°N 1.0810°E		1882–89	Restoration of a church dating from the 12-13th century, with the partial rebuilding of the tower and the east wall. It is now redundant.	II*
St Mary's Church ¶	North Wootton, Dorset; 50.9282°N 2.4895°W		1883	Built as a new parish church, incorporating some 15th-century fabric. Later converted into a private house, known as Magdalene Lodge.	II
St Mary Magdalene's Church ¶	Munster Square, Camden, Greater London; 51.5260°N 0.1425°W		1883–84	Added the north aisle and the crypt.	II*
All Saints Church ¶	Highbrook, West Hoathly, West Sussex; 51.0549°N 0.0574°W		1884	A new church in Gothic Revival style.	II
Sherborne Abbey	Sherborne, Dorset; 50.9467°N 2.5167°W		1884	Restoration of the tower. Carpenter also designed the reredos.	I
Digby Memorial	Sherborne, Dorset; 50.94637°N 2.51653°W		1884	A memorial in the form of a stone cross to George Digby Wingfield Digby.	II
East range of Chapel Court, Jesus College ¶	Cambridge; 52.2094°N 0.1252°E	—	1886	A new range with a central gatehouse, castellated and in four storeys.	II
Jesus College	Cambridge; 52.2092°N 0.1236°E	—	1886	Remodelling of the buildings surrounding the cloister and the outer courts.	I
St Agnes' Church	Bury Road, Newmarket, Suffolk; 52.2495°N 0.4159°E		1886	A new church built as a private chapel for Caroline Agnes Horsley-Beresford (1818-1894) (Duchess of Montrose), of 45 Belgrave Square, London and Sefton Lodge, Newmarket, a prominent racehorse owner who in later life used the pseudonym "Mr Manton". Built as a memorial to her second husband William Stuart Stirling-Crawfurd (1819-1883), who died in Cannes and was reburied here in 1888. The church stands 160 metres north-east of Sefton Lodge, named after Stirling-Crawfurd's 1878 Derby winner. Has an octagonal bell turret.	II*
St Peter's Church ¶	Ardingly, West Sussex; 51.0521°N 0.0899°W		1887	Restoration of a church dating from the 14th century, with the addition of a north aisle and a vestry.	I
Worksop College	Worksop, Nottinghamshire; 53.2883°N 1.1039°W	—	1895	A new school.	II
