= Orchis virescens =

Orchis virescens is a botanical synonym of two species of plant:

- Dactylorhiza viridis var. virescens published in 1805 by Carl Ludwig Willdenow crediting Gotthilf Heinrich Ernst Muhlenberg
- Platanthera chlorantha published in 1829 by Charles Gaudichaud-Beaupré crediting Caspar Tobias Zollikofer (1774-1843)
