= Gastrol =

Names
- Preferred IUPAC name 4-{[(4-Hydroxyphenyl)methoxy]methyl}-2-[(4-hydroxyphenyl)methyl]phenol

Identifiers
| CAS Number | 473231-03-7 |
| 3D model (JSmol) | Interactive image |
| ChEMBL | ChEMBL4461889 |
| ChemSpider | 552379 |
| PubChem CID | 636636 |
| CompTox Dashboard (EPA) | DTXSID501336186 |
- InChI: InChI=1S/C21H20O4/c22-19-6-1-15(2-7-19)11-18-12-17(5-10-21(18)24)14-25-13-16-3-8-20(23)9-4-16/h1-10,12,22-24H,11,13-14H2 Key: QBQNMIPDPJEZHR-UHFFFAOYSA-N; InChI=1/C21H20O4/c22-19-6-1-15(2-7-19)11-18-12-17(5-10-21(18)24)14-25-13-16-3-8-20(23)9-4-16/h1-10,12,22-24H,11,13-14H2 Key: QBQNMIPDPJEZHR-UHFFFAOYAC
- SMILES: C1=CC(=CC=C1CC2=C(C=CC(=C2)COCC3=CC=C(C=C3)O)O)O

Properties
| Chemical formula | C_{21}H_{20}O_{4} |
| Molar mass | 336.387 g·mol^{−1} |
- Except where otherwise noted, data are given for materials in their standard state (at 25 °C [77 °F], 100 kPa). Infobox references

Gastrol is a phenolic compound produced by the saprophytic orchid Gastrodia elata.
