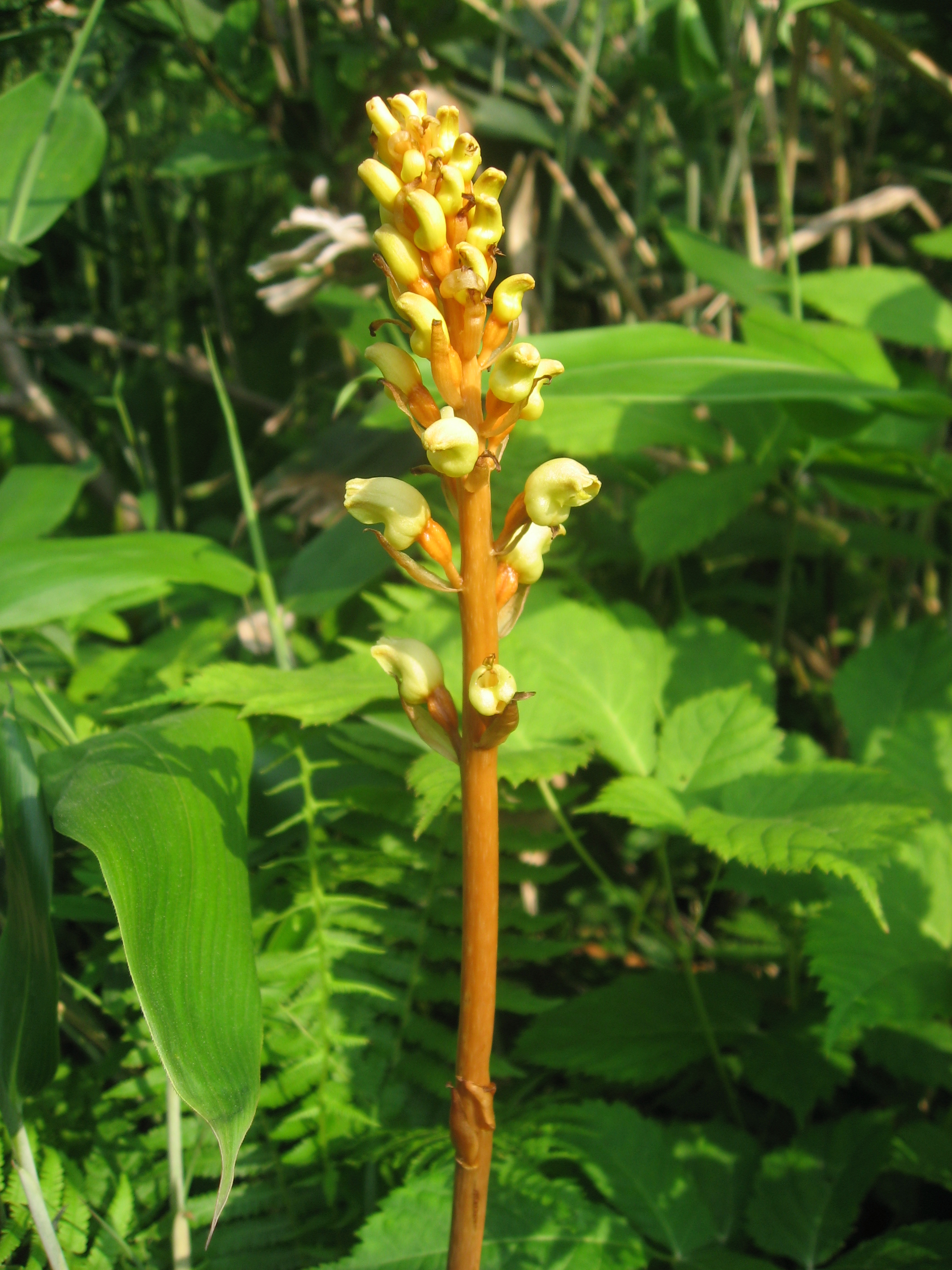
- Fukushima pref., Japan

Conservation status
- Vulnerable (IUCN 3.1)
- CITES Appendix II (Note: Subject to CITES Annotation #4)

Scientific classification
- Kingdom: Plantae
- Clade: Tracheophytes
- Clade: Angiosperms
- Clade: Monocots
- Order: Asparagales
- Family: Orchidaceae
- Subfamily: Epidendroideae
- Tribe: Gastrodieae
- Genus: Gastrodia
- Species: G. elata

Binomial name
- Gastrodia elata Blume

Subspecies
- G. e. f. alba; G. e. f. elata; G. e. f. flavida; G. e. f. glauca; G. e. f. viridis

Synonyms
- Gastrodia viridis Makino (1902); Gastrodia mairei Schltr. (1913); Gastrodia elata var. gracilis Pamp. (1915); Gastrodia elata f. pilifera Tuyama (1941)

= Gastrodia elata =

Species of plant

Gastrodia elata is a mycoheterotrophic perennial herb in the family Orchidaceae. It is found in Nepal, Bhutan, India, Japan, Korea, Siberia, Taiwan, and China.

== Description ==
The orchid has an 8–12 centimeters long elliptical underground rhizome with a diameter of 3–5 centimeters but may grow up to 7 centimeters. The stem is erect with a height of 0.3–1 meter up to 2 meters, the orange yellow, tan, cylinder, and leafless.

The flowered pale olivine or the orange red, the scape is length 5–30 centimeters, longest may be 50 centimeters. Floral Bracts are long lanceolate, length 1-1.5 centimeters; Pedicel and ovary of branch 0.7–1.2 centimeter, slightly short in colored bract; The sepal and the petal produce a slanting pot shape perianth tube, the perianth tube long the approximately 1 centimeter, the diameter 5–7 millimeters. The labellum is white, circular, with a length of 6–7 millimeters and width of 3–4 millimeters, the tip 3 cracks, the base pastes the tight pistil column full terminal, has a pair of pulp callus, in the callus connection perianth tube. The pistil column length 5–7 millimeters, have the short pistil column foot.

Capsule each approximately 30, oval or but actually oval, length 1.2–1.8 centimeters, width 8–9 millimeters. The seed are most, 2 – 40,000 grains of each fruit, minimum, powdery. Flowering season June to July, fruit time July to August.

== Growth ==
Gastrodia elata grows in symbiosis with the fungus Armillaria mellea on rotting wood, depending on the hypha of the fungus to invade the root system so that the plant can absorb nutrients from A. mellea.

== Distribution and habitat ==
It is found in Nepal, Bhutan, India, Japan (Hokkaido, Honshu, Shikoku, Kyuushu), Korea, Siberia, Taiwan, and China (in the provinces of Jilin, Liaoning, Inner Mongolia, Hebei, Shanxi, Shanxi, Gansu, Jiangsu, Anhui, Zhejiang, Jiangxi, Henan, Hunan, Hubei, Sichuan, Guizhou, Yunnan, and Tibet). It grows at elevations of 400–3,200 m (1,300–10,500 ft), at the edge of forests.

== Chemical properties ==
4-Hydroxybenzaldehyde and gastrodin can be found in the orchid G. elata. It also produces 2,4-Bis(4-hydroxybenzyl) phenol, gastrol, gastrodigenin and other related compounds.

== Traditional use ==
The herb, specifically the rhizome, is used in traditional Chinese medicine and Sichuan cuisine as tian-ma. It is one of the three orchids listed in the earliest known Chinese Materia Medica (Shennong Bencaojing) (c. 100 AD). Medicinally, it is used for 'calming the liver' and for treating headaches, dizziness, tetanus, and epilepsy. According to "Nutrition Review," "Gastrodia root has been shown to exert novel pain relief and inflammatory-mediating activities, as well as in vivo and in vitro inhibitory activity on nitric oxide (NO) production."

Gastrodin and gastrodigenin are thought to be the two signature compounds of this herb. The Chinese Pharmacopoeia requires medicinal rhizomes to contain, at minimum, 0.25% gastrodin + gastrodigenin by dry weight.
