= Newtimber =

Village and parish in West Sussex, England

Coordinates: 50°54′24″N 0°11′38″W

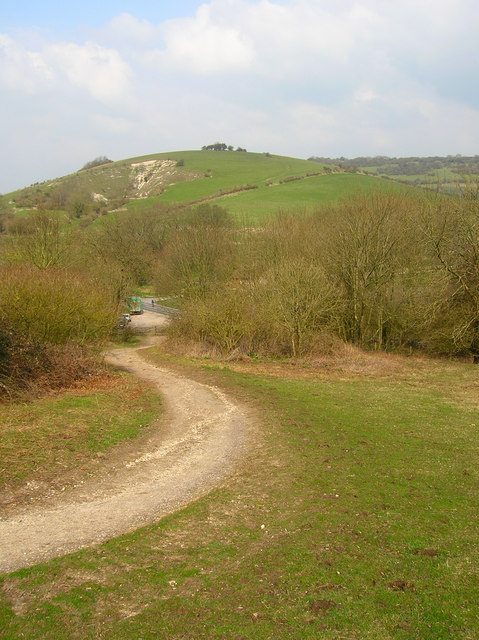
- Newtimber Hill

- Location within West Sussex
- Area: 6.95 km^{2} (2.68 sq mi)
- Population: 96 2001 Census
  - Density: 14/km^{2} (36/sq mi)
- OS grid reference: TQ271138
  - London: 41 miles (66 km) N
- Civil parish: Newtimber
- District: Mid Sussex
- Shire county: West Sussex
- Region: South East
- Country: England
- Sovereign state: United Kingdom
- Post town: HASSOCKS
- Postcode district: BN6
- Dialling code: 01273
- Police: Sussex
- Fire: West Sussex
- Ambulance: South East Coast
- UK Parliament: Arundel and South Downs
- Website: Newtimber Parish

Newtimber is a small village and civil parish in the Mid Sussex District of West Sussex, England. It is located north-west of Brighton. The parish also includes the hamlet of Saddlescombe. The parish lies almost wholly with the South Downs National Park, with the exception of a small section of the parish north of the B2117 road. The planning authority for Newtimber is therefore the South Downs National Park Authority (SDNPA), the statutory planning authority for the National Park area. The downland scarp, which includes Newtimber Hill, Newtimber Holt, Saddlescombe chalk quarry and Summer Down, is mostly part of the Beeding Hill to Newtimber Hill, designated Site of Special Scientific Interest.

The parish covers an area of 695 hectares (1,720 acres). At the 2011 Census the population was included in the civil parish of Poynings.

== Listed Buildings and Scheduled Monuments ==
Newtimber civil parish contains 12 listed buildings. Of these, one is Grade I, one is Grade II* and the remaining 10 buildings are Grade II. The parish contains three scheduled monuments.

=== Listed buildings ===
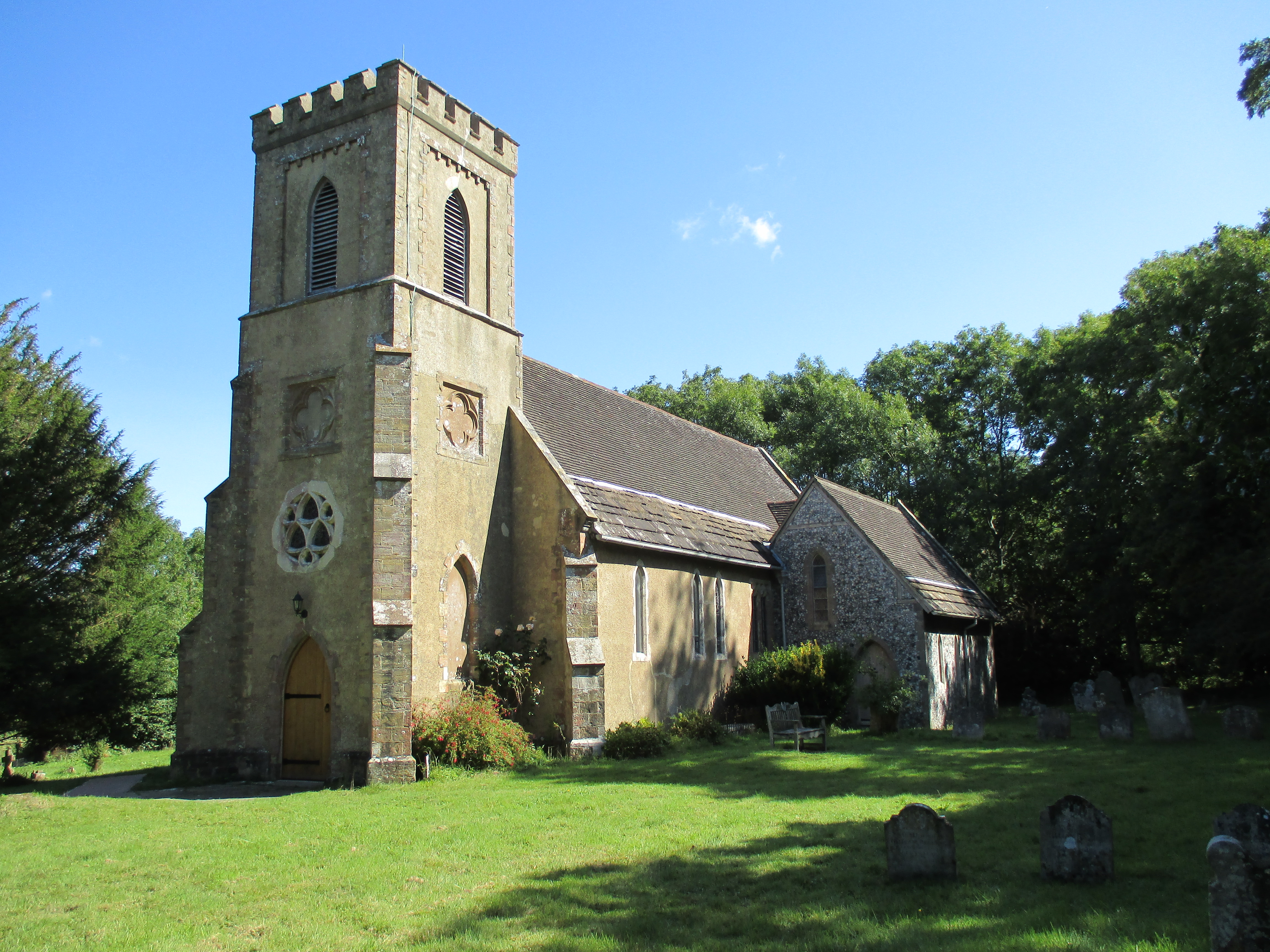
St John Evangelist Church, Newtimber

Grade I listed buildings:

- Newtimber Place (List Entry Number 1025629), a moated house; the oldest portion was built by the Bellingham family in the 16th century, but the main portion dates from the late 17th century.

Grade II* listed buildings:

- The Parish Church of St John Evangelist (List Entry Number 1354879), essentially 13th century, though the medieval work has been largely overlaid by restoration work in 1875; the tower was added in 1839.

=== Scheduled monuments ===
- Bowl barrow on North Hill (List Entry Number 1014949), a circular mound with a deep central hollow, indicating partial excavation in the past.
- Group of three bowl barrows and an Anglo-Saxon mixed cemetery on Summer Down (List Entry Number 1014952), a linear group of three prehistoric barrows and a later Anglo-Saxon cremation and inhumation cemetery.
- Cross dyke on Newtimber Hill (List Entry Number 1015717), a roughly north–south aligned cross dyke constructed across a chalk ridge, partly disturbed by flint diggings, tree roots and downland tracks.

== Notable buildings and areas ==
Map

Newtimber is a small parish with a scattered population, which may be as low as seventy five inhabitants. It stretches from the Brighton and Hove downland to its south to the Albourne parish in the Sussex Weald to its north. To its west is the Poynings parish and to its east lies Pyecombe.

=== Saddlescombe ===
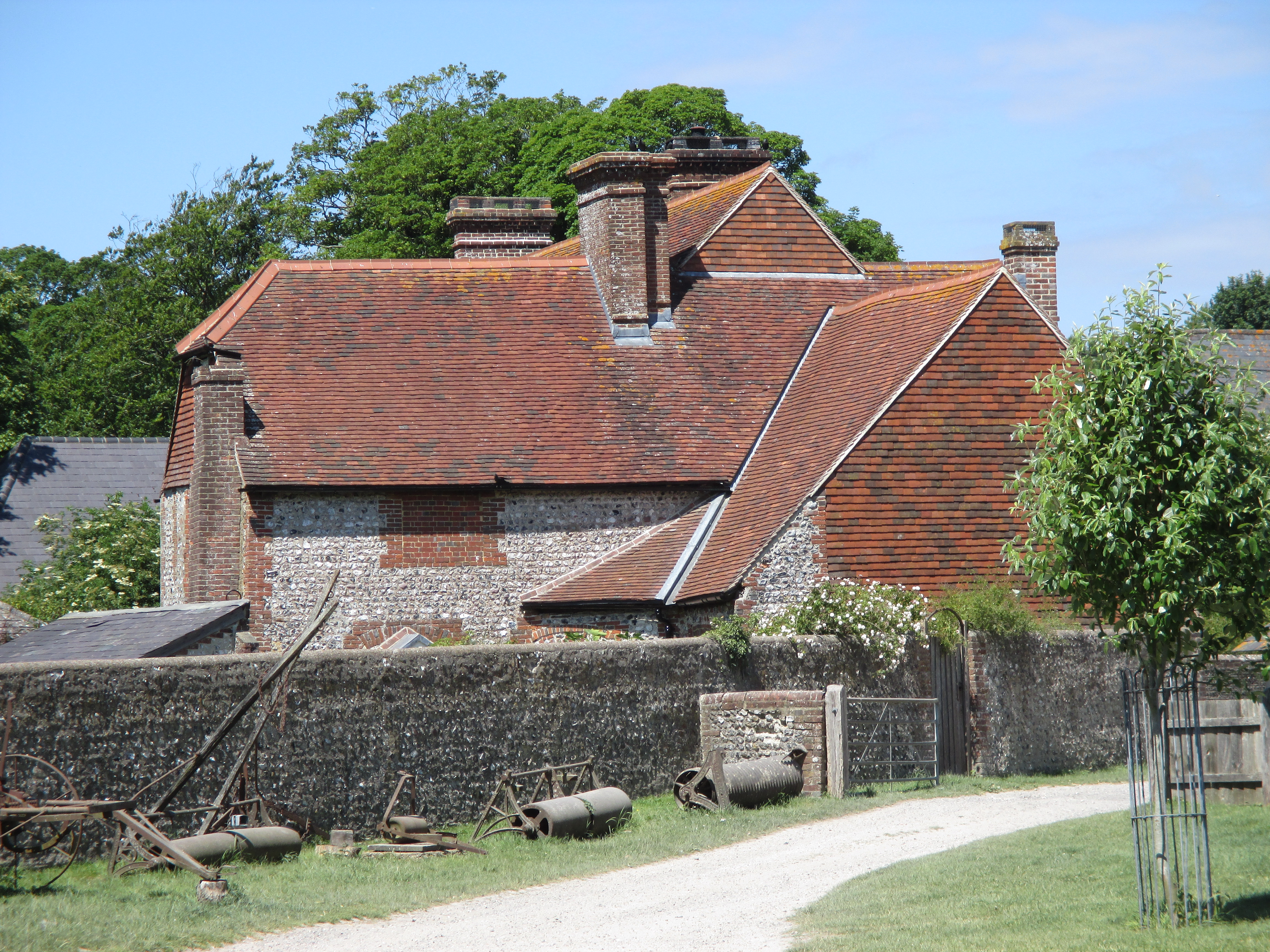
Saddlescombe Farm

Saddlescombe (TQ 272 114) is a hamlet in the Newtimber parish; it lies on the road from Poynings to Brighton, 5.4 miles (8.7 km) northwest of Brighton.

Saddlescombe Farm is a busy little place sitting at the base of the Downs which has been owned by the National Trust along with the surrounding countryside since 1995. It has lots of history having been listed as a working farm since the Domesday Book, belonging to the Knights Templar for around 100 years and being one of the two manors of Newtimber Parish. The ancient well in middle of the village green is probably the only visible relic of the manor and the donkey wheel above it that wound up the hamlet's water is still intact. There are rusting iron oxen shoes tacked to the old doorway farmhouse.

The hamlet consists of several threshing barns, large storage barns, a variety of houses, forge, cattle yard and dairy, duck pond, donkey wheel, pig sties, chicken coops and old stables.

=== Newtimber Place ===
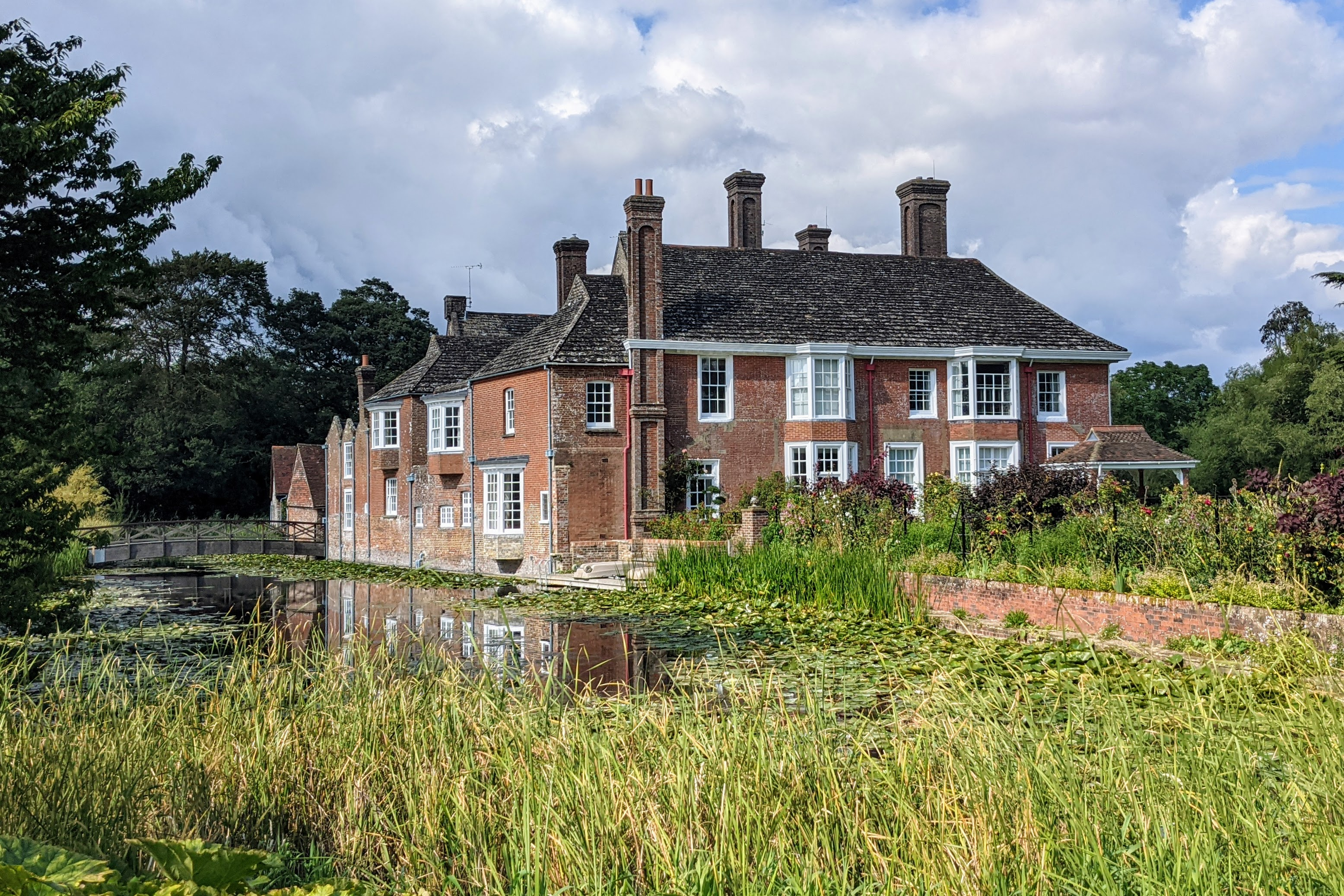
Newtimber Place, West Sussex

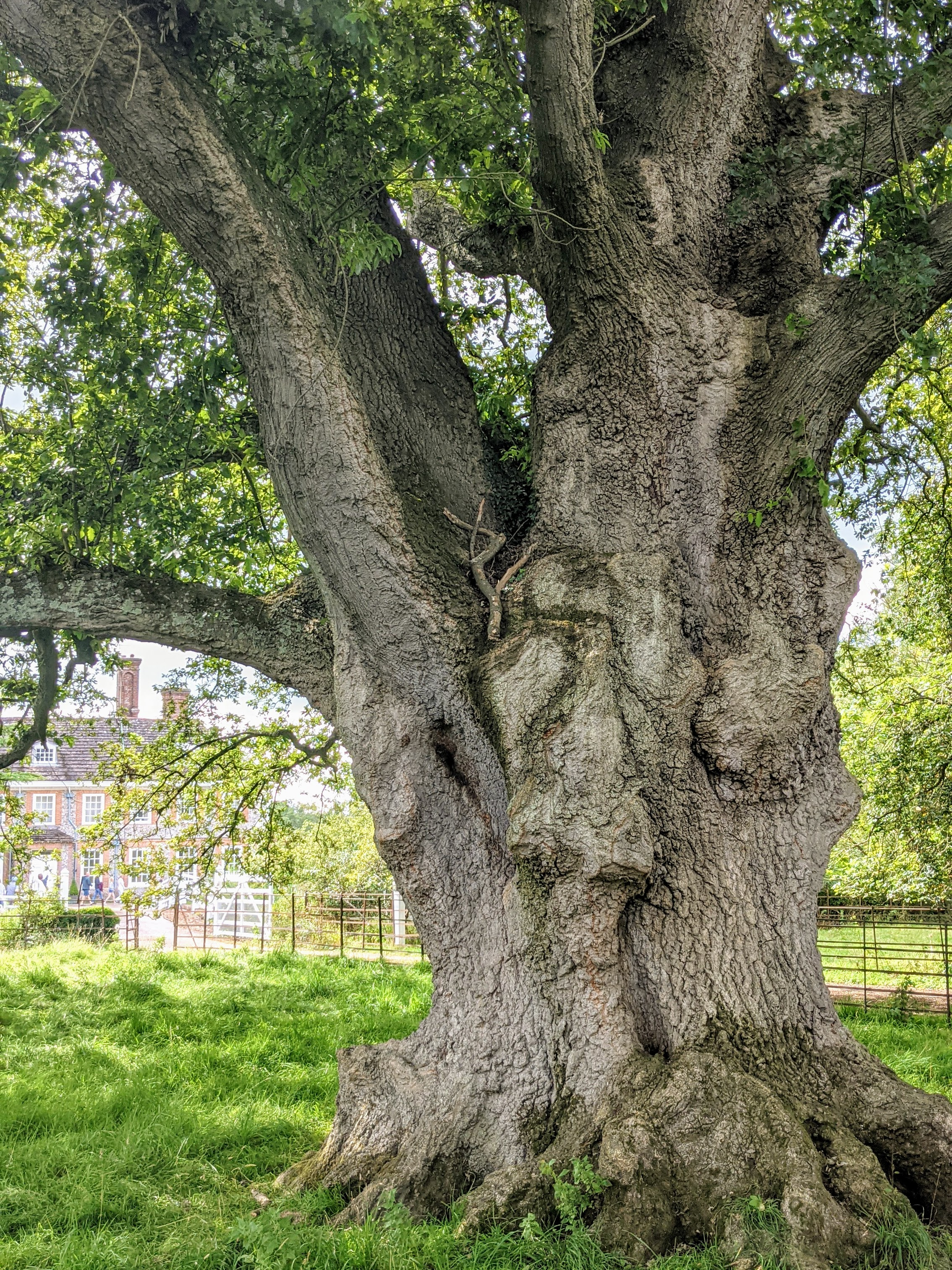
Big, old, Turkey Oak tree, Newtimber Place

Newtimber Place (TQ 269 137) is a 16th-century house, likely built by the sheriff of Sussex, Richard Bellingham. It has a wide moat which goes right up to its walls, with white bridge that is fed by clear, chalk spring water. It has a giant turkey oak tree outside.

To the west of the house is Newtimber Wood (TQ 266 134). This is an intact hazel and hornbeam coppice with fine oaks and ash that borders on Park Wood in the neighbouring parish of Poynings. Both woods are botanically rich.

=== Down and scarpland ===
With the exception of the Dyke Golf Course, the Downland scarp is owned by the National Trust and most of it is Open Access.

==== Newtimber Holt ====
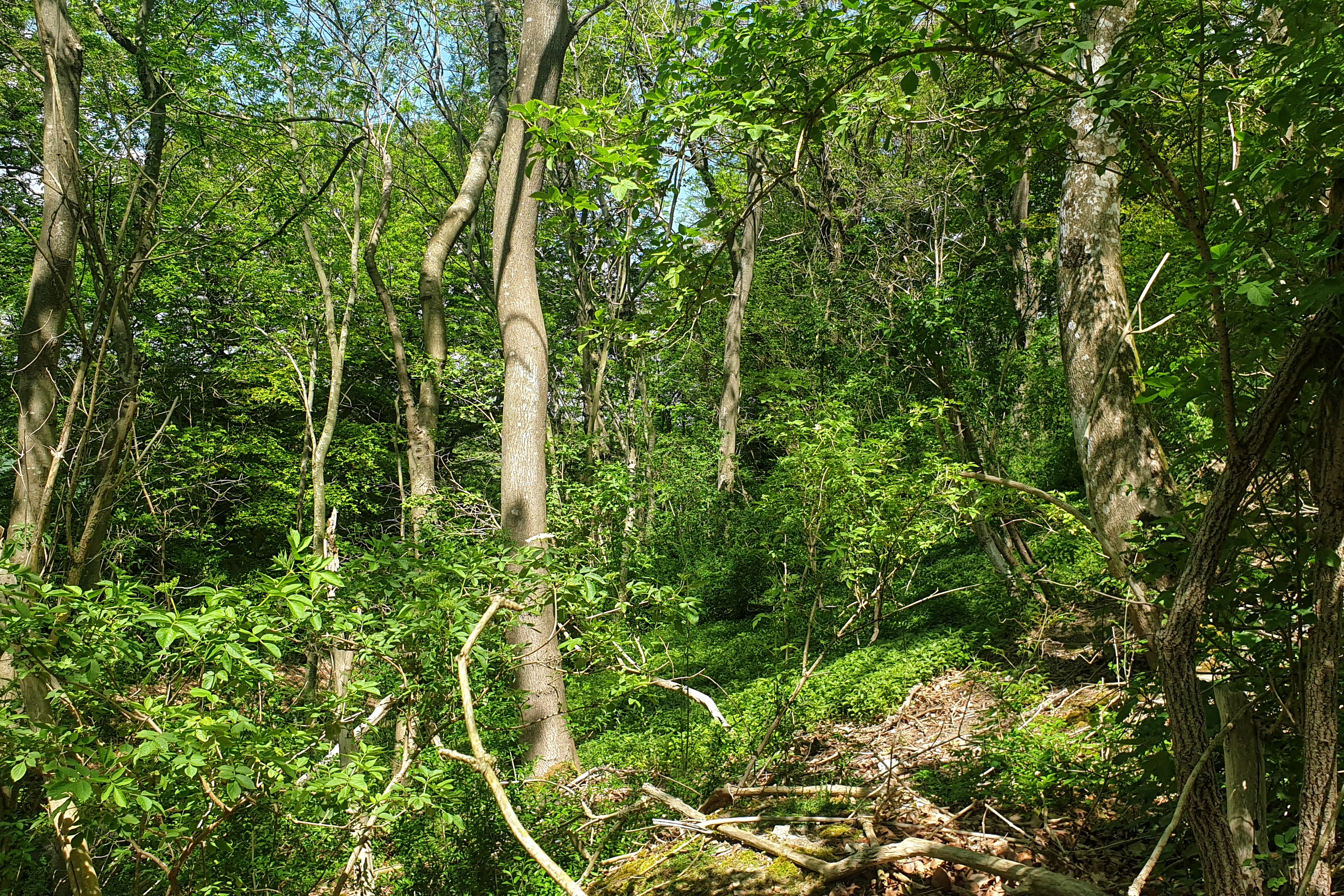
Newtimber Holt above Beggar's Lane

Newtimber Holt (TQ 277 126) is a rich and ancient woodland with a history possibly going back ten thousand years. There are at least twenty ancient woodland indicator species including wych elm, maple and even midland hawthorn (usually found on the Weald Clay). The Holt doesn't have large-leaved lime anymore, but it does have some very tall large-leaved / small-leaved lime hybrids and these, with the good representation of other trees and shrubs, is indicative of the Holt's age. There are lots of bluebell in spring, with some wood anemone, goldilocks buttercup, yellow archangel, early purple orchis, polypody fern, redcurrant, nettle-leaved bellflower as well as other indicator herbs and grasses of ancient woodland. In May one can find both species of red cardinal beetle sunning themselves on fallen beech boles, for there is an abundance of dead wood. The rotting timber hosts many interesting fungi and slime moulds in autumn.

The Holt is in two very steep combes on the Hill's north eastern corner, but since Victorian times most of the rest of the Hill's northern slope has also grown over into ash, beech and hazel secondary woodland. The Holt is bounded on its south side by the rising bostal bridlepath. There are some big trees including an old beech boundary pollard halfway up the bostal. Sycamore is invading more and more of the wood and is changing its character over time. Roe deer enjoy the deeper parts of the Holt and bird song fills the air at dawn in springtime, but the noise of the nearby A23 means it is no longer a wholly tranquil place.

At the bottom of the Holt is the sunken Beggar's Lane (TQ 267 126) surrounded by high beech trees. The quiet road runs round the north west corner of Newtimber Hill. One can find white helleborine orchis, wood millet and wood melic on its banks. At its southern end it joins the Saddlescombe road, but that is not its original course that the Romans took. Just a few yards to the west and below the busy lane back to Poynings is a wooded terrace which is the original Roman path. If one finds the path, one may also come across a very old and big beech pollard (TQ 266 123).

==== Newtimber Hill ====
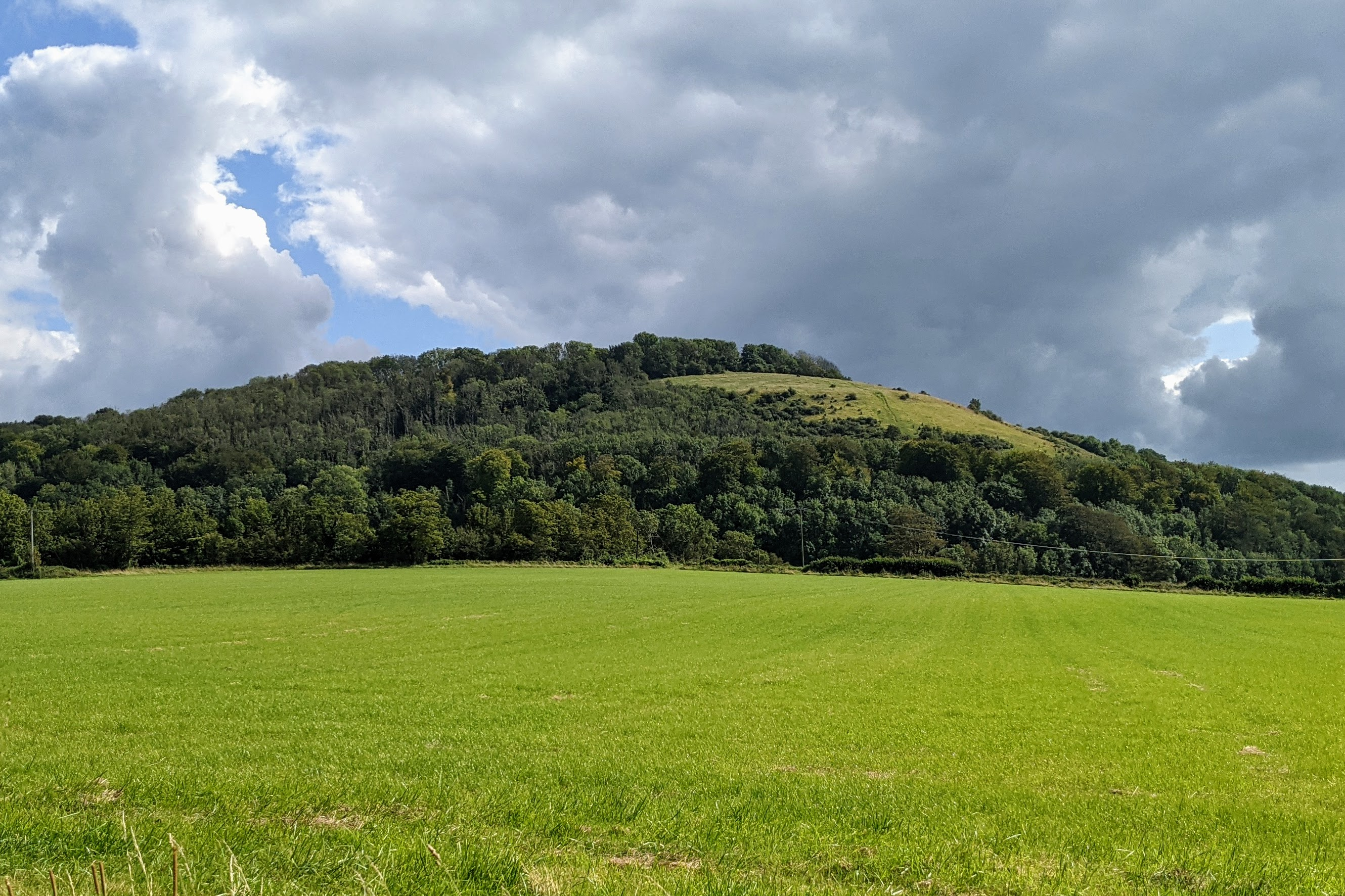
Newtimber Hill, view from the Newtimber Wood on the north side

Views from Newtimber Hills western slopes extend all along the ocean wave of the chalk scarp to Hampshire, and across the dim blue forest to Blackdown on the Surrey border. One can find tiny frog orchids and a funny late-flowering form of burnt-tip orchids in its turf. There's a ribbon of tormentil where the chalky slopes break to meet the acidic plateau top. There are anthills, cattle terracettes and some years dark green fritillary, the rare silver-spotted skipper butterfly and a big populations of glowworm.

On the west flank of Newtimber Hill, above and below the Saddlescombe Road, are disused braided trackways, that are known locally as the ‘Devil's Stairs’. In this area lives a population of ancient juniper, our most special and rarest native bushy species. Some of the bushes may be as old as four hundred years, despite being only ten metres (thirty foot) or so high. The bushes' ancestors are likely some of the first woody species re-colonizing postglacial Britain, as it is a classic species of the cold tundra grasslands. Unfortunately, the Newtimber junipers are the only native ones on the Brighton Downs, despite Wolley-Dod in 1937 recording it as being abundant to the west of Brighton and present if rare to the east. The National Trust and the Sussex Wildlife Trust are now bravely restoring the juniper's old Down pasture habitat and it is being planted on the A27 bypass at Stanmer and Devil's Dyke.

On the top of Newtimber Hill there are two dew ponds (TQ 272 123), one which is dried and now covered with colourful with waxcaps and the other a restored dew pond with much pond life. South of the dew ponds the plateau descends by a staircase of medieval strip lynchets to the combe of sheltered Saddlescombe. The lynchets are chalky in character with nice flowers and old meadow fungi, with waxcap (meadow, crimson and scarlet hood) with scatters of earth tongues and clumps of five or six species of coral fungi.

==== North, East and West Hill ====
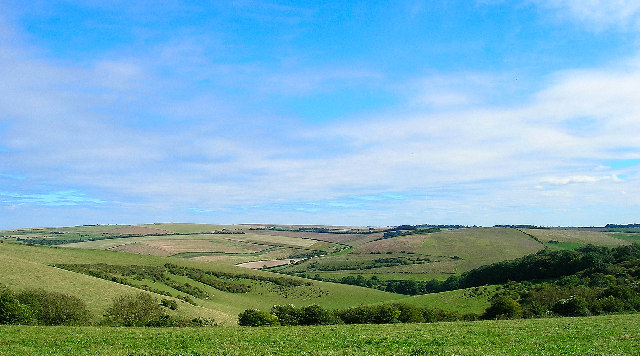
Downland above Brighton

North, East and West Hill all surround Saddlecombe. North Hill (TQ 270 120) has two prominent Bronze Age barrows in which, despite being previously robbed, archeologists found pottery vessels, a skeleton and a dagger. The barrows themselves sit at the top of the hill in an island of old acid grassland. There are treasures still there in the form of betony, eggs and bacon, tormentil and knapweed, and in autumn (in a good year) a real cornucopia of colourful waxcaps, coral fungi and earth tongues, including several old pasture indicator species. West Hill has some pristine old chalk grassland with an up-slope fringe of scrub and some rare dyer’s greenweed.

==== Saddlescombe chalk quarry ====
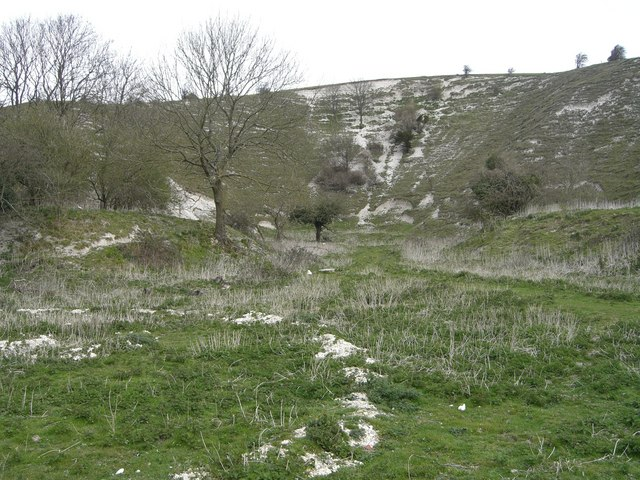
Saddlescombe pit

Saddlescombe chalk quarry (TQ 270 116) still has the old limekilns under some big old bushes. There are chalk-loving mosses, waxcaps and earth tongues on the terracettes. There are many butterflies, including the adonis blue, in summer but the grayling butterfly has now gone and there is only one site in Sussex where it remains.

==== Cross Dyke ====
There's a cross dyke (TQ 275 124)) between West Hill and Newtimber Hill, along the line of the bridlepath, which is believed to be a prehistoric land boundary. It is now a scheduled monument.

==== Summer Down ====
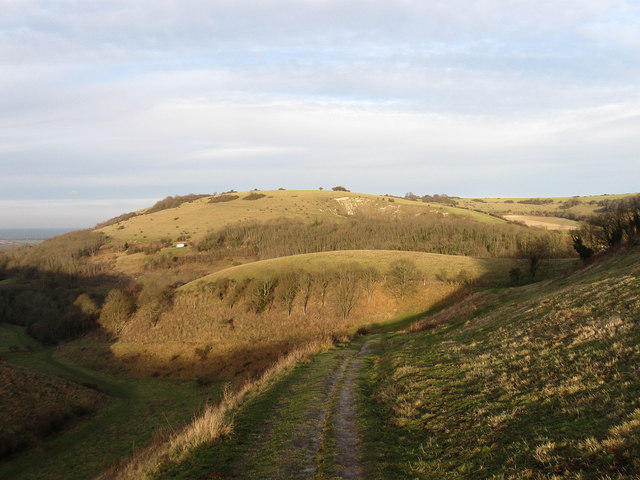
Bridleway, Summer Down

Summers Down (TQ 267 110) is a bushy acid grassland with lots of sheltered places and a good view of the Poynings Gap. The place was a pagan Saxon cemetery, the site of an old windmill, and a small cross dyke, but they are difficult to make out. South of the road, the National Trust car park has three Bronze Age bowl barrows still upstanding, both with their tops dug out by treasure seekers of the past.

Part of Summer Down (TQ 272 111) is fenced off from Summer Down road on its south side, though it is scored with the deep-cut braided paths of that road. The cut up tracks are three metres (ten feet) deep caused by centuries of passage by pack horse trains, carts and flocks. These are deeper than the ditches of the Devil's-Dyke hillfort.

==== Ewe Bottom ====
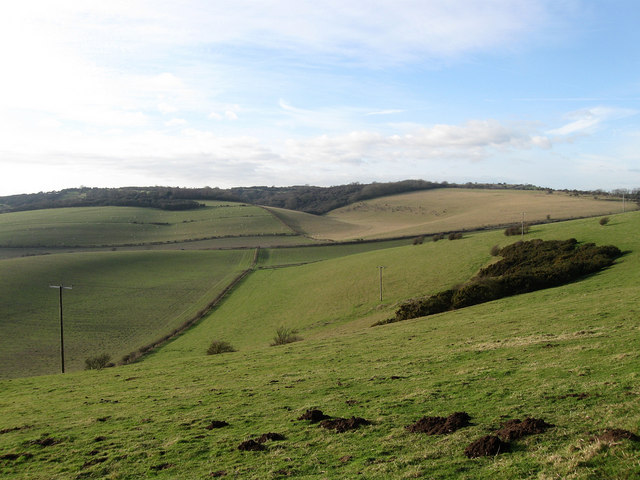
Ewe Bottom

Most of Ewe Bottom (TQ 267 106) used to be part of Saddlescombe's sheep pastures, although the area west of the bridlepath was part of Poynings’ pastures. Since the construction of the golf course, it has been left largely derelict and the gorse and thorn on its valley sides have spread across the entire valley. Now the side of the valley itself is growing into ash woodland in the next stage of this long succession. There are very large, old hawthorn bushes in these thickets, which can be seen along the footpath on the south-east perimeter of the golf course (TQ 270 100).

==== Pond Brow ====
Pond Brow (TQ 271 105) has two peaceful old dew ponds which watered these great pastures, which were known as West Down. Now they are fenced off from the golf course and are used by the sheep on the ex-arable land below. The ponds’ are fringed with flote grass, shaded by gorse and thorn draped with honeysuckle.

The valley sides south of Pond Brow were also part of West Down and tiny fragments of old flower-rich pastures survive on the steepest parts. Where those pastures met the road (TQ 275 103) the verges are still colourful with old Downland herbs including swarms of spotted orchid, many vetches, including grass vetchling, and pea family herbs.

==== Dyke Golf Course ====
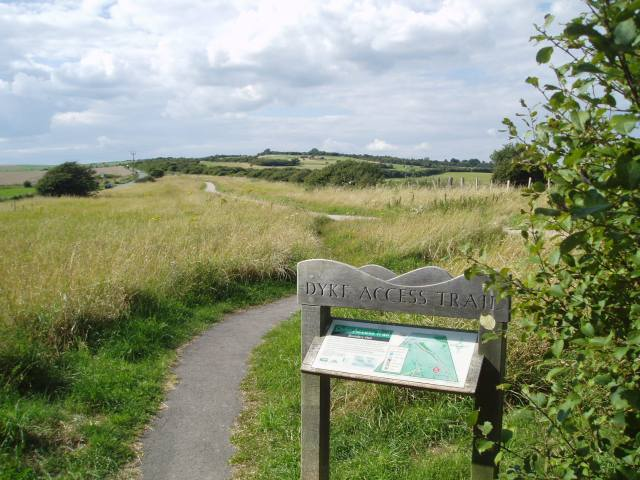
Dyke Access Trail

The Devil's Dyke Golf Course (TQ 265 103) was founded in 1908, although there was a women's course that pre-dated it. It was badly damaged in the Second World War when it was used for tank training, but Brighton Council rebuilt it.

The course has lost almost all of its old Down pasture flowers, but remarkably, many of the old meadow fungi seem to have survived. At least fourteen have been found there including waxcaps and coral fungi.

East of the bridlepath there is a spot, now largely forgotten, which used to be called Beggar's Haven (TQ 266 104) where a curled up skeleton was unearthed in Victorian times with a necklace of beads of lignite and tubular beads of bronze.Accompanying it was a decorated pottery ‘beaker’ nearly five inches wide of a type found at several sites on these Downs. Probably a burial mound once rose above this early Bronze Age burial, but it isn't there anymore.
