= Habenariol =

Names
- IUPAC name bis(4-hydroxyphenyl)methyl (2R)-2-ethyl-2-hydroxy-4-methylpentanoate
- Other names Bis-p-hydroxybenzyl-2-isobutylmalate

Identifiers
CAS Number	216752-89-5
3D model (JSmol)	Interactive image
ChemSpider	129432750
PubChem CID	100989770
UNII	ZQ3HW7236N
- InChI: InChI=1S/C21H26O5/c1-4-21(25,13-14(2)3)20(24)26-19(15-5-9-17(22)10-6-15)16-7-11-18(23)12-8-16/h5-12,14,19,22-23,25H,4,13H2,1-3H3/t21-/m1/s1 Key: RXNVZHSSBDLGHI-OAQYLSRUSA-N
- SMILES: c1cc(O)ccc1COC(=O)C(O)(CC(C)C)CC(=O)OCc(cc2)ccc2O

Properties
Chemical formula	C_{22}H_{26}O_{7}
Molar mass	402.443 g·mol^{−1}
- Except where otherwise noted, data are given for materials in their standard state (at 25 °C [77 °F], 100 kPa). Infobox references

Habenariol is a phenolic compound found in the semi-aquatic orchid Habenaria repens. It acts as a feeding deterrent against the freshwater crayfish Procambarus clarkii.

== See also ==
- Gastrodigenin, a phenolic compound found in other orchids
