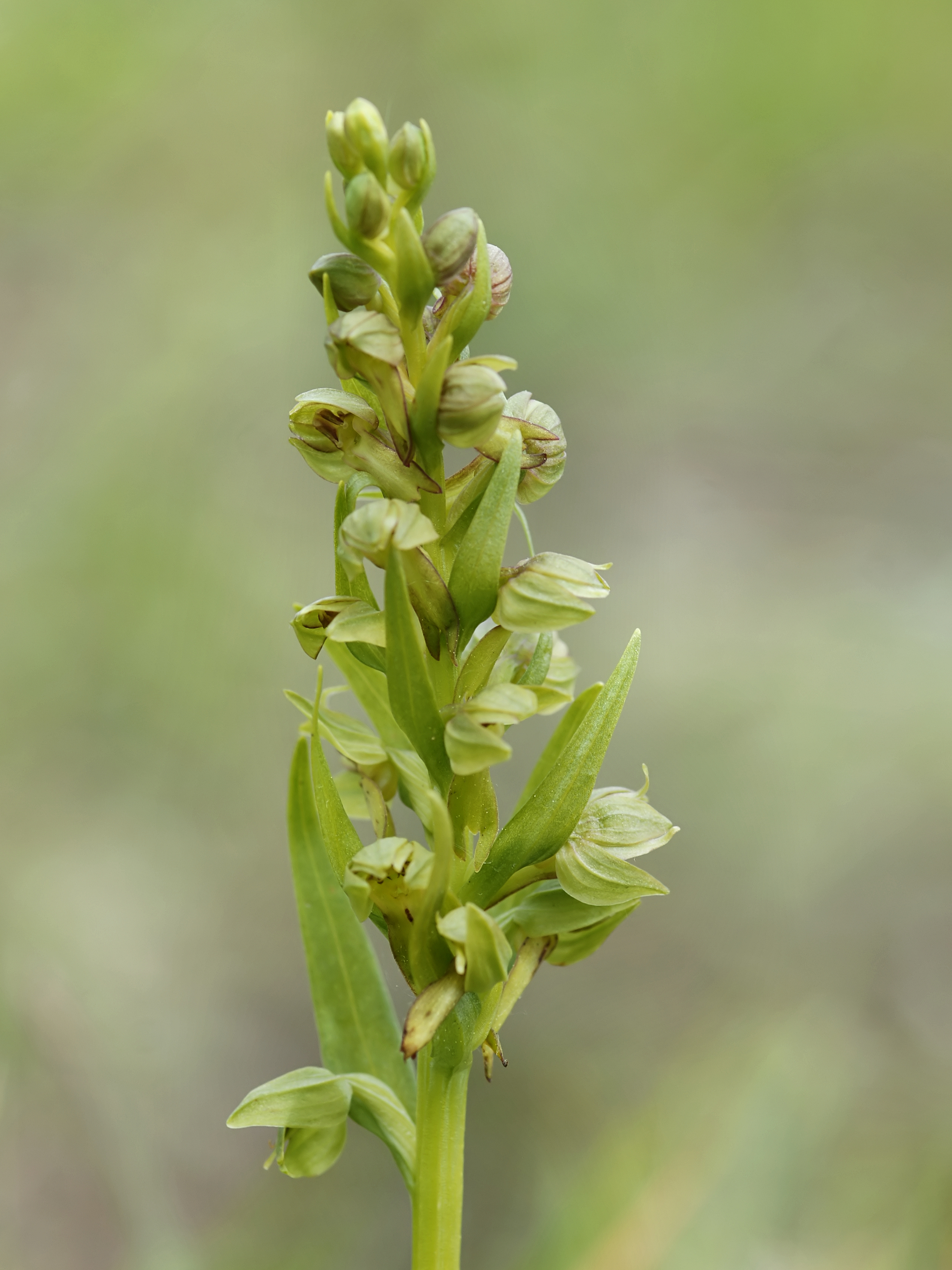
- Flowering stem

Scientific classification
- Kingdom: Plantae
- Clade: Tracheophytes
- Clade: Angiosperms
- Clade: Monocots
- Order: Asparagales
- Family: Orchidaceae
- Subfamily: Orchidoideae
- Genus: Dactylorhiza
- Species: D. viridis

Binomial name
- Dactylorhiza viridis (L.) R.M.Bateman, Pridgeon & M.W.Chase

Varieties
- D. v. var. virescens; D. v. var. viridis

Synonyms
- List: Chamorchis viridis (L.) Dumort.; Coeloglossum viride (L.) Hartm.; Coeloglossum viride subsp. eurasiaticum Selander; Entaticus viridis (L.) Gray; Gymnadenia viridis (L.) Rich.; Habenaria viridis (L.) R.Br.; Himantoglossum viride (L.) Rchb.; Orchis viridis (L.) Crantz; Peristylus viridis (L.) Lindl.; Platanthera viridis (L.) Lindl.; Satyrium viride L.; Sieberia viridis (L.) Spreng.

= Dactylorhiza viridis =

Frog orchid or long-bracted orchid

Species of flowering plant

Dactylorhiza viridis, the frog orchid, is a species of flowering plant in the orchid family Orchidaceae. It has also been treated as the only species Coeloglossum viride of the monotypic genus Coeloglossum.

== Description ==
The plant arises from fleshy, forked roots and ranges in height from 10 to 55 cm (3.9 to 22 in). The leaves of D. viridis are 5–14 cm (2.0–5.5 in) long and 2–7 cm (0.8–2.8 in) wide; leaves at the base of the orchid are obovate to elliptical, while leaves higher on the stem become lanceolate. Two to six leaves are found on one plant, and leafing is alternate.

The inflorescence of the orchid is a dense raceme (spike-like cluster) containing 7 to 70 small flowers. Flowers are greenish in color, and often tinged with purple, reddish, or red-brown color. The flowers are subtended by conspicuous long, tapering bracts which are 1–6 cm (0.4–2 in) long, with the lower bracts longer and typically greatly exceeding the length of the flower. The sepals are oval with little or no point, 3–7 mm long and 2–4 mm wide and dark green. The sepals join with the petals to form a hood opposite the labellum (lower petal) of the flower. Petals are long and narrow, 3.5–5 mm long and about 0.5 mm wide, and curve inwards. The labellum is strap-shaped and usually split at the very tip to form two or three tooth-like divisions, with the middle tooth smaller than the others. It is 5–11 mm long and 1–4 mm wide. A 2–3 mm long nectar spur projects behind the labellum.

Dactylorhiza viridis flowers in late May and early June. It is either pollinated by bees and small wasps, or reproduces autogamously by incoherent pollinia; that is, the pollinia crumble and some pollen falls on the stigma, fertilizing the flower.

In North America, Dactylorhiza viridis can be mistaken for Platanthera flava (the pale green orchid), but can be best distinguished by the labellum, which is notched at the apex and does not have the tubercle of P. flava.

== Taxonomy ==
Dactylorhiza viridis was named Satyrium viride by Carl Linnaeus in 1753. It was moved to the genus Dactylorhiza in 1997 by Richard Bateman, Alec Melton Pridgeon, and Mark Wayne Chase. It is classified as part of the Orchidaceae family.

The species has two accepted varieties:

- Dactylorhiza viridis var. viridis
- Dactylorhiza viridis var. virescens (Muhl. ex Willd.) Baumbach

Dactylorhiza viridis has 91 synonyms of the species or one of its varieties according to Plants of the World Online.

Table of Synonyms
Name	Year	Rank	Synonym of:	Notes
Chamorchis viridis (L.) Dumort.	1827	species	D. viridis	≡ hom.
Coeloglossum bracteatum (Muhl. ex Willd.) Parl.	1860	species	var. virescens	= het.
Coeloglossum bracteatum var. kashmiricum Soó	1929	variety	var. viridis	= het.
Coeloglossum coreanum (Nakai) Schltr.	1920	species	var. virescens	= het.
Coeloglossum islandicum (Lindl.) Kom.	1927	species	var. viridis	= het.
Coeloglossum kaschmirianum Schltr.	1920	species	var. viridis	= het.
Coeloglossum nankotaizanense (Masam.) Masam.	1968	species	var. viridis	= het.
Coeloglossum taiwanianum S.S.Ying	1975	species	var. viridis	= het.
Coeloglossum vaillantii (Ten.) Schur	1866	species	var. viridis	= het.
Coeloglossum viride (L.) Hartm.	1820	species	D. viridis	≡ hom.
Coeloglossum viride var. akaishimontanum Satomi	1969	variety	var. virescens	= het.
Coeloglossum viride subsp. bracteatum (Muhl. ex Willd.) K.Richt.	1890	subspecies	var. virescens	= het.
Coeloglossum viride var. bracteatum (Muhl. ex Willd.) A.Gray	1867	variety	var. virescens	= het.
Coeloglossum viride f. bracteatum (Muhl. ex Willd.) Bolzon	1909	form	var. virescens	= het.
Coeloglossum viride f. brevibracteatum Asch. & Graebn.	1907	form	var. viridis	= het.
Coeloglossum viride var. collinum Rupp ex Walth.Zimm.	1912	variety	var. viridis	= het.
Coeloglossum viride f. collinum (Rupp ex Walth.Zimm.) Höppner	1924	form	var. viridis	= het.
Coeloglossum viride subsp. coreanum (Nakai) Satomi	1969	subspecies	var. virescens	= het.
Coeloglossum viride f. dentatum Zapał.	1906	form	var. viridis	= het.
Coeloglossum viride subsp. eurasiaticum Selander	1950	subspecies	D. viridis	≡ hom., not validly publ.
Coeloglossum viride f. gracillimum Schur	1866	form	var. viridis	= het.
Coeloglossum viride f. grandiflorum Zapał.	1906	form	var. viridis	= het.
Coeloglossum viride f. integrum Soó	1970	form	var. viridis	= het., without indication of the type.
Coeloglossum viride var. interjecta (Fernald) Miyabe & Kudô	1932	variety	var. virescens	= het.
Coeloglossum viride subsp. islandicum (Lindl.) Selander	1950	subspecies	var. viridis	= het.
Coeloglossum viride subsp. islandicum (Lindl.) Kreutz	2007	subspecies	var. viridis	= het.
Coeloglossum viride var. islandicum (Lindl.) M.Schulze	1898	variety	var. viridis	= het.
Coeloglossum viride f. islandicum (Lindl.) O.Gruss & M.Wolff	2007	form	var. viridis	= het.
Coeloglossum viride var. labellifidum (Costa ex Vayr.) E.G.Camus	1908	variety	var. viridis	= het.
Coeloglossum viride f. lancifolium Rohlena	1913	form	var. viridis	= het.
Coeloglossum viride f. longibracteatum Asch. & Graebn.	1907	form	var. viridis	= het.
Coeloglossum viride f. microbracteatum Schur	1870	form	var. viridis	= het.
Coeloglossum viride f. parviflorum Höppner	1924	form	var. viridis	= het.
Coeloglossum viride f. purpureum Schur	1866	form	var. viridis	= het.
Coeloglossum viride var. rhenanum Höppner	1924	variety	var. viridis	= het.
Coeloglossum viride f. roseum Bolzon	1910	form	var. viridis	= het.
Coeloglossum viride f. rubens Norm.	1893	form	var. viridis	= het.
Coeloglossum viride var. subalpinum Rupp ex Walth.Zimm.	1912	variety	var. viridis	= het., nom. illeg.
Coeloglossum viride f. subalpinum Neuman	1901	form	var. viridis	= het.
Coeloglossum viride var. thuringiacum Rupp ex Walth.Zimm.	1912	variety	var. viridis	= het.
Coeloglossum viride f. thuringiacum (Rupp ex Walth.Zimm.) Höppner	1924	form	var. viridis	= het.
Coeloglossum viride var. vaillantii (Ten.) Thell.	1914	variety	var. viridis	= het.
Coeloglossum viride var. virescens (Muhl. ex Willd.) Luer	1975	variety	var. virescens	≡ hom.
Coeloglossum viride f. virescens (Muhl. ex Willd.) O.Gruss & M.Wolff	2007	form	var. virescens	≡ hom.
Dactylorhiza viridis var. coreana (Nakai) N.S.Lee	2011	variety	var. virescens	= het.
Entaticus viridis (L.) Gray	1821	species	D. viridis	≡ hom.
Gymnadenia viridis (L.) Rich.	1817	species	D. viridis	≡ hom.
Habenaria bracteata (Muhl. ex Willd.) R.Br.	1813	species	var. virescens	= het.
Habenaria flava var. virescens (Muhl. ex Willd.) Fernald	1921	variety	var. virescens	≡ hom.
Habenaria viridis (L.) R.Br.	1813	species	D. viridis	≡ hom.
Habenaria viridis subsp. bracteata (Muhl. ex Willd.) R.T.Clausen	1949	subspecies	var. virescens	= het.
Habenaria viridis var. bracteata (Muhl. ex Willd.) A.Gray	1867	variety	var. virescens	= het.
Habenaria viridis var. interjecta Fernald	1926	variety	var. virescens	= het.
Herminium nankotaizanense Masam.	1932	species	var. viridis	= het.
Himantoglossum viride (L.) Rchb.	1830	species	D. viridis	≡ hom.
Orchis batrachites Schrank	1786	species	var. viridis	= het.
Orchis bractealis Salisb.	1808	species	var. virescens	= het., nom. superfl.
Orchis bracteata Muhl. ex Willd.	1805	species	var. virescens	= het.
Orchis coreana Nakai	1914	species	var. virescens	= het.
Orchis ferruginea (F.W.Schmidt) F.W.Schmidt	1795	species	var. viridis	= het.
Orchis flava var. virescens (Muhl. ex Willd.) Green	1814	variety	var. virescens	≡ hom.
Orchis obsoleta Muhl. ex Willd.	1805	species	var. virescens	= het.
Orchis virens Scop.	1771	species	var. viridis	= het.
Orchis virescens Muhl. ex Willd.	1805	species	var. virescens	≡ hom.
Orchis viridis (L.) Crantz	1769	species	D. viridis	≡ hom.
Orchis viridis var. labellifida Costa	1877	variety	var. viridis	= het., nom. nud.
Orchis viridis var. labellifida Costa ex Vayr.	1880	variety	var. viridis	= het.
Orchis viridis var. major Tinant	1836	variety	var. viridis	= het.
Orchis viridis var. vaillantii Ten.	1831	variety	var. viridis	= het.
Peristylus bracteatus (Muhl. ex Willd.) Lindl.	1835	species	var. virescens	= het.
Peristylus islandicus Lindl.	1835	species	var. viridis	= het.
Peristylus montanus Schur	1866	species	var. viridis	= het.
Peristylus virescens (Muhl. ex Willd.) Lindl.	1835	species	var. virescens	≡ hom.
Peristylus viridis (L.) Lindl.	1835	species	D. viridis	≡ hom.
Peristylus viridis var. bracteata (Muhl. ex Willd.) Blytt	1861	variety	var. virescens	= het.
Peristylus viridis var. macrobracteatus Schur	1866	variety	var. viridis	= het.
Platanthera bracteata (Muhl. ex Willd.) Torr.	1843	species	var. virescens	= het.
Platanthera islandica (Lindl.) Kraenzl.	1931	species	var. viridis	= het.
Platanthera nankotaizanensis (Masam.) Masam.	1932	species	var. viridis	= het.
Platanthera viridis (L.) Lindl.	1829	species	D. viridis	≡ hom.
Platanthera viridis var. bracteata (Muhl. ex Willd.) Rchb.f.	1851	variety	var. virescens	= het.
Platanthera viridis var. densiflora Regel	1868	variety	var. viridis	= het.
Satyrium alpinum F.W.Schmidt	1793	species	var. viridis	= het.
Satyrium bracteale Salisb.	1812	species	var. virescens	= het.
Satyrium bracteatum Pers.	1807	species	var. viridis	= het., nom. illeg.
Satyrium ferrugineum F.W.Schmidt	1793	species	var. viridis	= het.
Satyrium fuscum Huds.	1762	species	var. viridis	= het.
Satyrium lingulatum Vill.	1787	species	var. viridis	= het.
Satyrium virescens (Muhl. ex Willd.) Pers.	1807	species	var. virescens	≡ hom.
Satyrium viride L.	1753	species	D. viridis	≡ hom.
Sieberia viridis (L.) Spreng.	1817	species	D. viridis	≡ hom.
Notes: ≡ homotypic synonym; = heterotypic synonym

== Distribution ==
Dactylorhiza viridis has a wide distribution across the cooler parts of the Northern Hemisphere, covering much of Europe, non-tropical Asia (Russia, Japan, China, the upper Himalayas, etc.), much of Canada and parts of the United States (Alaska, Northeast, the Appalachians, Great Lakes Region, Northern Great Plains, and Rocky Mountains). It is typically found growing in moist, rich soil in wet meadows, moist or wet deciduous woods and thickets, and is frequently found on steep slopes.

== Ecology ==
Dactylorhiza viridis is mainly pollinated by beetles and a wide range of Hymenoptera including ants.

This orchid species is able to form symbiotic partnerships with a variety of fungi including Ceratobasidium sp., Epulorhiza anaticulata, Moniliopsis anomala, Rhizoctonia sp., Tulasnella cucumeris and Tulasnella calospora.

== Chemistry ==
The chemistry of a variety that has been known as bracteatum is complex, featuring a wealth of bioactive constituents, at least seven of which are peculiar to the plant. Known compounds found thus far to be present are 4-hydroxybenzaldehyde, 4-hydroxybenzyl alcohol (=Gastrodigenin), 4,4'-dihydroxydibenzyl ether, 4,4'-dihydroxydiphenylmethane (see Xenoestrogen), 4-(4-hydroxybenzyloxy)benzyl alcohol, gastrodin, quercetin-3,7-diglucoside (see Flavonol glycoside), thymidine, loroglossin, militarine, dactylorhin A, dactylorhin B, β-Sitosterol and daucosterol.
