= Newtimber Place =

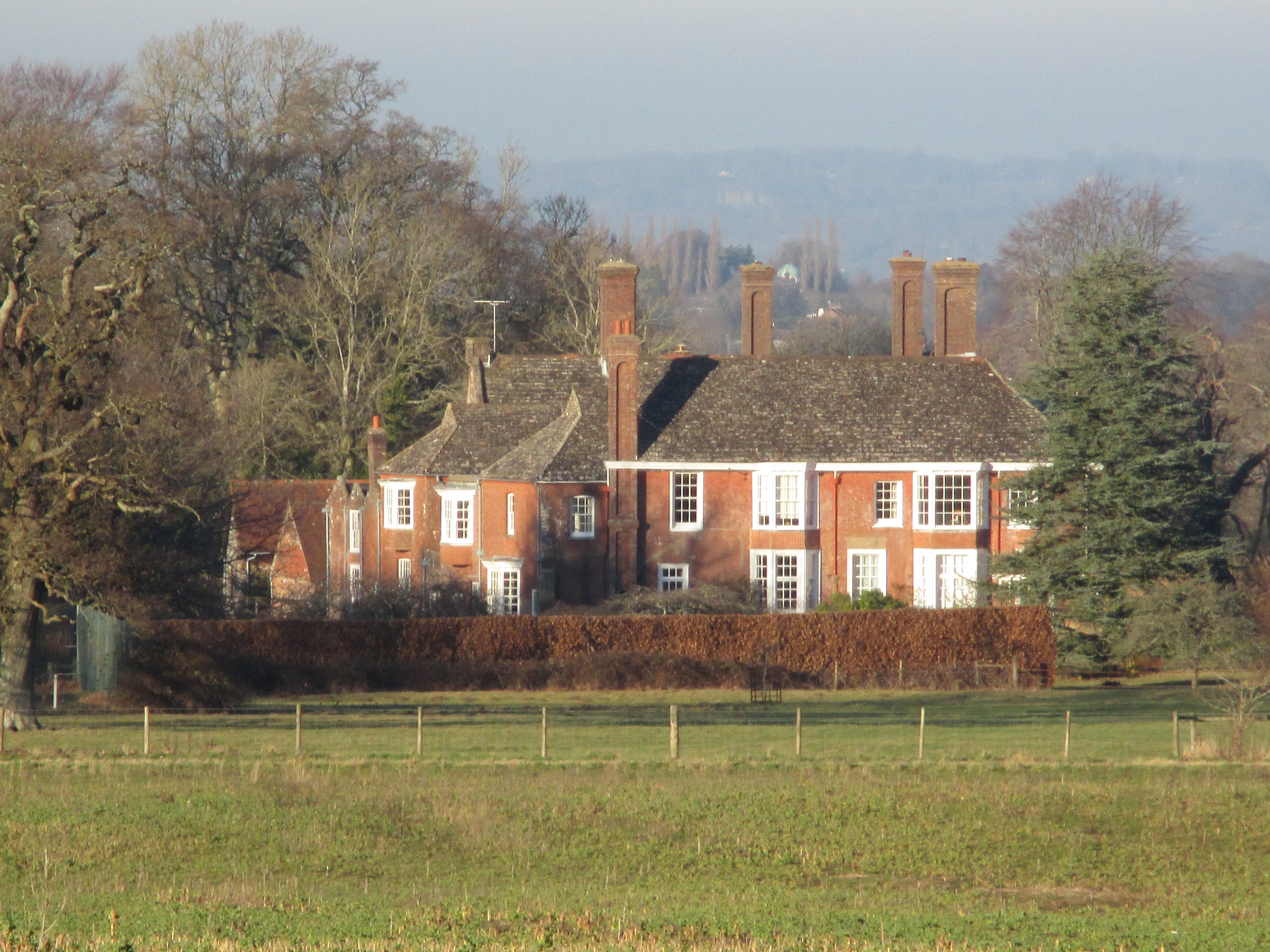
- Newtimber House seen from the south

- Location within West Sussex
- 50.90912°N 0.19651°W
- Type: Country house
- Location: Newtimber
- OS grid reference: TQ2689513728

History
- Built: ca 16th Century

Site notes
- Area: West Sussex

Listed Building – Grade I
- Designated: 28 Oct 1957
- Reference no.: 1025629

Newtimber Place is a Grade I listed building in the Mid Sussex district of West Sussex, England. The house sits on a D-shaped island in a moat. The oldest part of the house dates from the 16th century.

The north wing is apparently the oldest part of the building, dating from the 16th century. It was considerably extended in the 17th century by the addition of the east wing. The house is built from flint and red brick with stone quoins.

Until 1933, owners of Newtimber Place also held the advowson (the right to appoint the rector) for St John Evangelist Church which sits next door.

The grounds are in the northern part of the civil parish of Newtimber, which gets its name from the building.
