= Gastrodigenin =

- Chemical structure of gastrodigenin

Names
- IUPAC name 4-(Hydroxymethyl)phenol
- Other names 4-Hydroxybenzyl alcohol

Identifiers
CAS Number	623-05-2
3D model (JSmol)	Interactive image
ChEBI	CHEBI:67410
ChEMBL	ChEMBL202132
ChemSpider	122
ECHA InfoCard	100.009.790
EC Number	210-768-0
KEGG	C17467
PubChem CID	125
UNII	1A3AH1FP1B
CompTox Dashboard (EPA)	DTXSID8073920
- InChI: InChI=1S/C7H8O2/c8-5-6-1-3-7(9)4-2-6/h1-4,8-9H,5H2 Key: BVJSUAQZOZWCKN-UHFFFAOYSA-N; InChI=1/C7H8O2/c8-5-6-1-3-7(9)4-2-6/h1-4,8-9H,5H2 Key: BVJSUAQZOZWCKN-UHFFFAOYAV
- SMILES: C1=CC(=CC=C1CO)O

Properties
Chemical formula	C_{7}H_{8}O_{2}
Molar mass	124.139 g·mol^{−1}
Appearance	white crystalline powder
Odor	fruity or almond-like
- Except where otherwise noted, data are given for materials in their standard state (at 25 °C [77 °F], 100 kPa). Infobox references

Gastrodigenin (4-hydroxybenzyl alcohol) is a phenolic compound found in the rhizome of the orchid Gastrodia elata. It has a fruity aroma described as "fruity, almond/bitter almond, sweet, coconut". Gastrodin is the glucoside of gastrodigenin.

== See also ==
- Habenariol, a phenolic compound found in the semi aquatic orchid Habenaria repens
