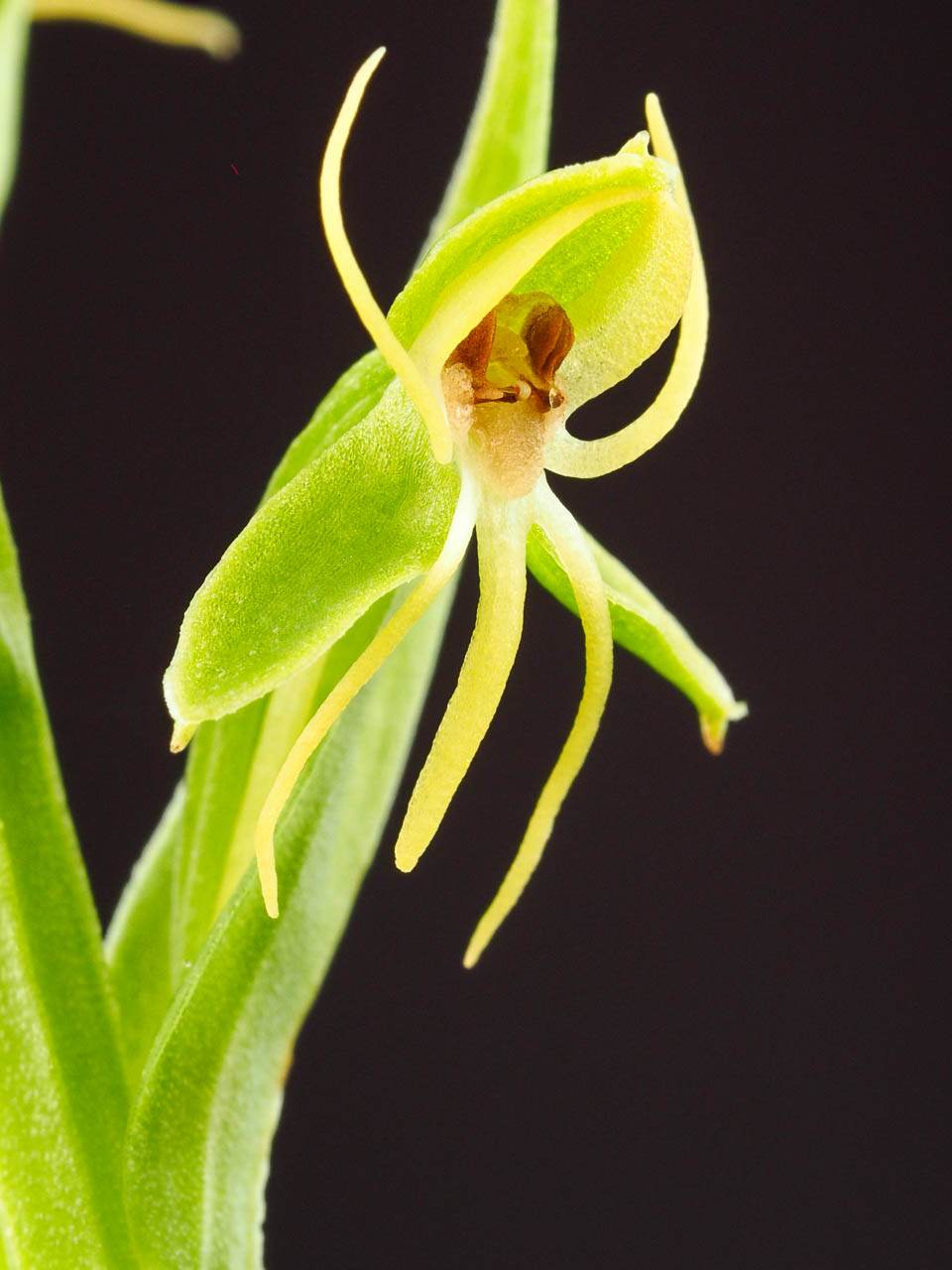

Conservation status
- Secure (NatureServe)
- CITES Appendix II (CITES)

Scientific classification
- Kingdom: Plantae
- Clade: Tracheophytes
- Clade: Angiosperms
- Clade: Monocots
- Order: Asparagales
- Family: Orchidaceae
- Subfamily: Orchidoideae
- Genus: Habenaria
- Species: H. repens

Binomial name
- Habenaria repens Nutt. (1818)

Synonyms
- Mesicera repens (Nutt.) Raf.; Platanthera repens (Nutt.) Alph.Wood; Habenaria maxillaris Lindl.; Platanthera foliosa Brongn. in L.I.Duperrey; Habenaria sceptrodes Rchb.f.; Habenaria radicans Griseb., as synonym; Habenaria nuttallii Small; Habenaria pseudorepens Schltr.; Habenaria palustris Acuña, not valid, no description; Habenaria paucifolia var. estolonifer M.N.Correa

= Habenaria repens =

Species of orchid

Habenaria repens, commonly called the water-spider bog orchid or the floating orchid, is an orchid species widespread across Latin America from Mexico and the West Indies south to Argentina, as well as in the Southeastern United States from Texas and Oklahoma east to Florida and the Carolinas plus an isolated population in Virginia.

A phenolic compound called habenariol can be found in H. repens. It acts as a feeding deterrent.

== Varieties ==
Two taxonomic varieties are accepted as of June 2014:

- Habenaria repens var. maxillaris (Lindl.) Garay - Guatemala, Colombia, Ecuador, Peru, Bolivia
- Habenaria repens var. repens - most of species range including those regions listed for var. maxillaris
