= Gastrodin =

- Chemical structure of gastrodin

Names
- IUPAC name 4-(Hydroxymethyl)phenyl β-D-glucopyranoside
- Systematic IUPAC name (2R,3S,4S,5R,6S)-2-(Hydroxymethyl)-6-[4-(hydroxymethyl)phenoxy]oxane-3,4,5-triol
- Other names Gastrodine; 4-(β-D-glucopyranosyloxy)benzyl alcohol

Identifiers
CAS Number	62499-27-8
3D model (JSmol)	Interactive image
ChemSpider	102977
ECHA InfoCard	100.208.712
PubChem CID	115067
UNII	5YS9U2W3RQ
CompTox Dashboard (EPA)	DTXSID30978086
- InChI: InChI=1S/C13H18O7/c14-5-7-1-3-8(4-2-7)19-13-12(18)11(17)10(16)9(6-15)20-13/h1-4,9-18H,5-6H2/t9-,10-,11+,12-,13-/m1/s1 Key: PUQSUZTXKPLAPR-UJPOAAIJSA-N; InChI=1/C13H18O7/c14-5-7-1-3-8(4-2-7)19-13-12(18)11(17)10(16)9(6-15)20-13/h1-4,9-18H,5-6H2/t9-,10-,11+,12-,13-/m1/s1 Key: PUQSUZTXKPLAPR-UJPOAAIJBX
- SMILES: O(c1ccc(cc1)CO)[C@@H]2O[C@@H]([C@@H](O)[C@H](O)[C@H]2O)CO

Properties
Chemical formula	C_{13}H_{18}O_{7}
Molar mass	286.280 g·mol^{−1}
- Except where otherwise noted, data are given for materials in their standard state (at 25 °C [77 °F], 100 kPa). verify (what is ?) Infobox references

Gastrodin is a chemical compound which is the glucoside of gastrodigenin. It has been isolated from the rhizomes of two orchid species, Gastrodia elata and Galeola faberi. It can also be produced by biotransformation of 4-hydroxybenzaldehyde by Datura tatula cell cultures.

G. elata rhizome is a herb used in traditional Chinese medicine to treat headache, and it is standardized in the Chinese Pharmacopoeia by gastrodin and gastrodigenin content. In line with this traditional use, gastrodin and its acetyl derivative (acetagastrodin) are used in China as an over-the-counter drug to treat neurasthenia, headache, and migraine. It is available as a dietary supplement in other countries.

A Chinese literature review considers it useful for a range of central nervous system disorders, with the evidence coming from mostly Chinese research.
