= St John Evangelist Church, Newtimber =

St John the Evangelist
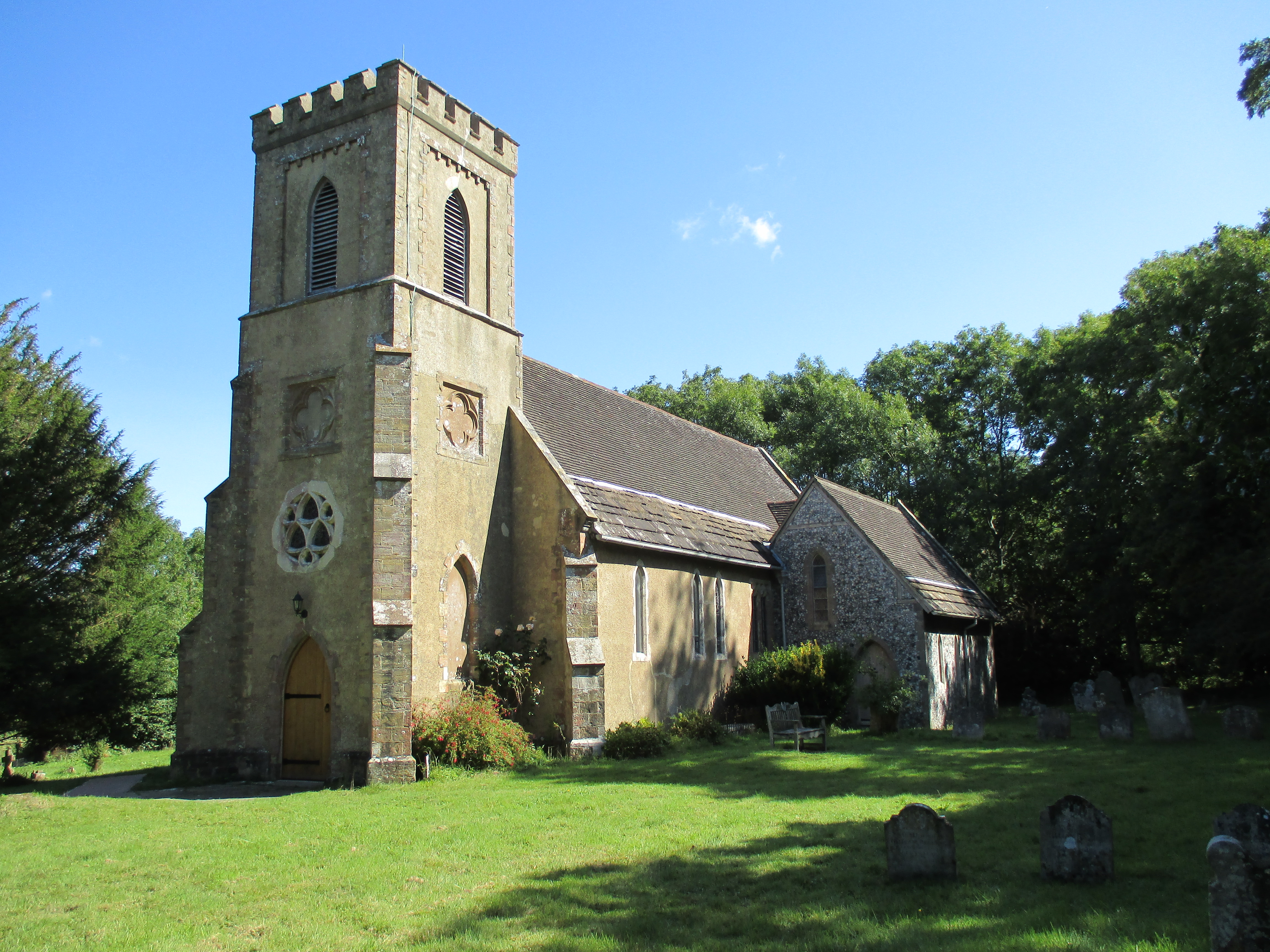
- St John the Evangelist
- 50°54′21″N 0°11′36″W
- Location: Newtimber, West Sussex
- Country: England
- Denomination: Anglican

History
- Status: Parish church
- Dedication: Saint John the Evangelist

Architecture
- Heritage designation: Grade II* listed
- Designated: 28 October 1957

St John the Evangelist Church is an Anglican church in Newtimber, West Sussex.

== History ==
The church was founded in the thirteenth century. The tower was a much later addition in 1839, paid for from the proceeds of Charles Gordon's compensation for enslaved people on the Gordon family's plantations in Braco, Jamaica following the Slavery Abolition Act 1833 and Slave Compensation Act 1837.

The building was significantly restored in 1875 by Gothic Revival architects Richard Carpenter and Benjamin Ingelow.

The families which owned Newtimber Place, the manor house next door to the church, held the advowson, the right to appoint the rector, until 1933, when it was combined with that of Pyecombe.

The churchyard has a memorial to the men who drowned aboard the SS Mendi, when, as a First World War troopship, it sank in 1917 after a collision. The commemorative stone, installed a century later in 2017, reads:

"In memory of Chief Henry Bokleni Ndamase and the 670 African men from the Eastern Cape who lost their lives when the RMS Mendi sank in the English Channel 21st February 1917, With gratitude for the heroic sacrifice they made in responding to Britain’s call for help, Nkosi sikeleli Africa".

The church was grade II* listed by Historic England in 1957 and given the List Entry Number 1354879.

== Gallery ==
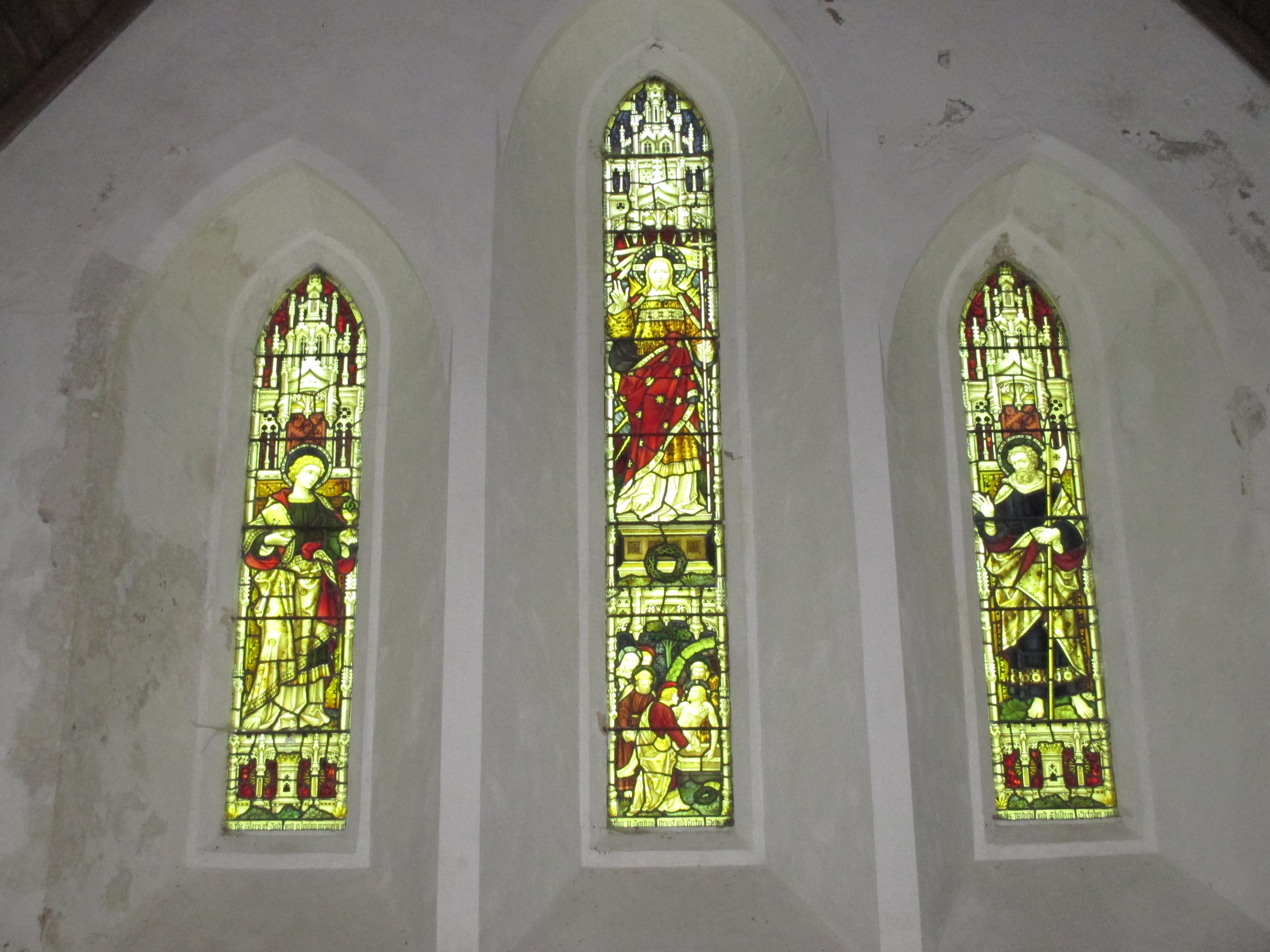
Newtimber east window

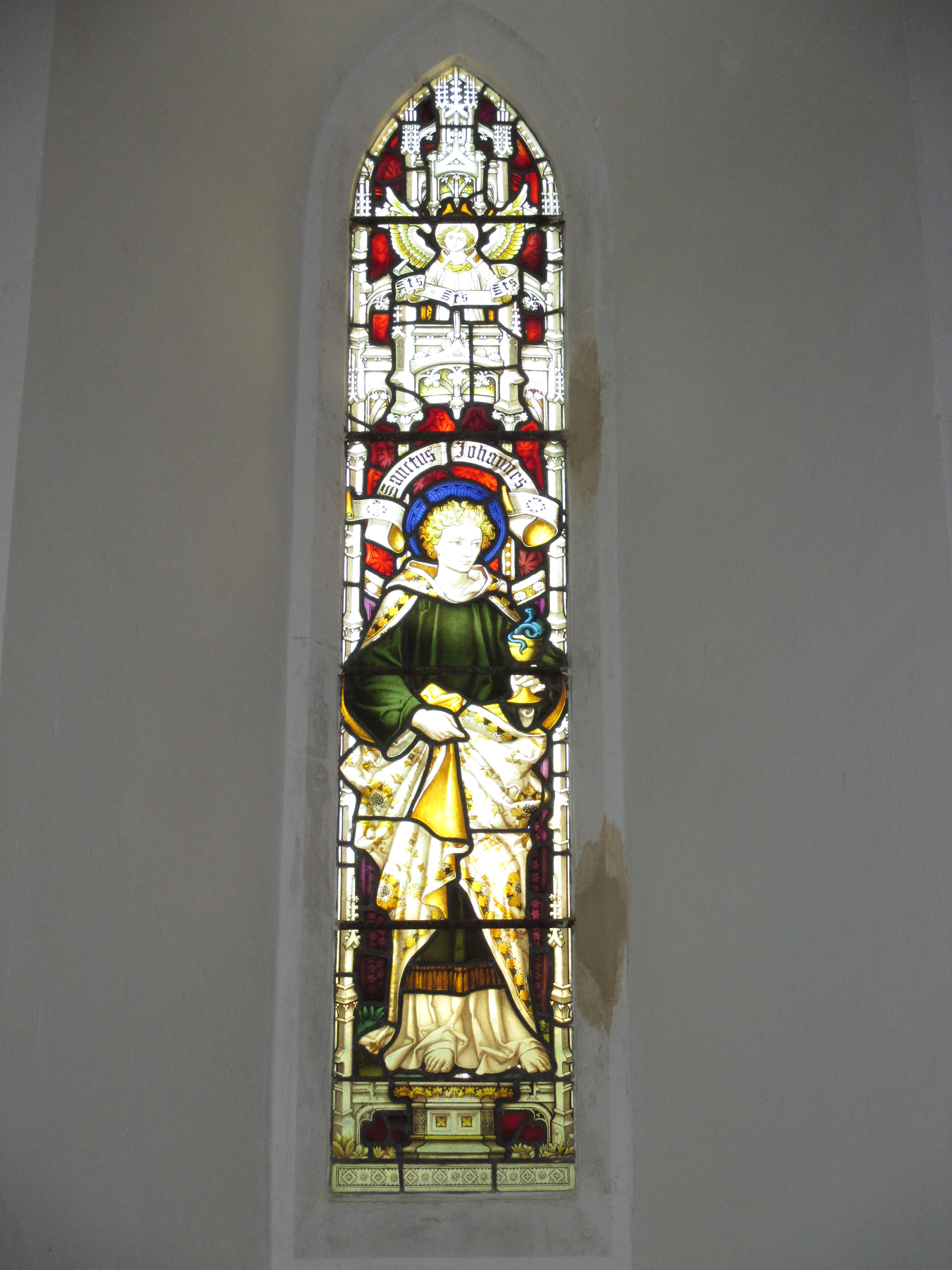
Newtimber north aisle first window

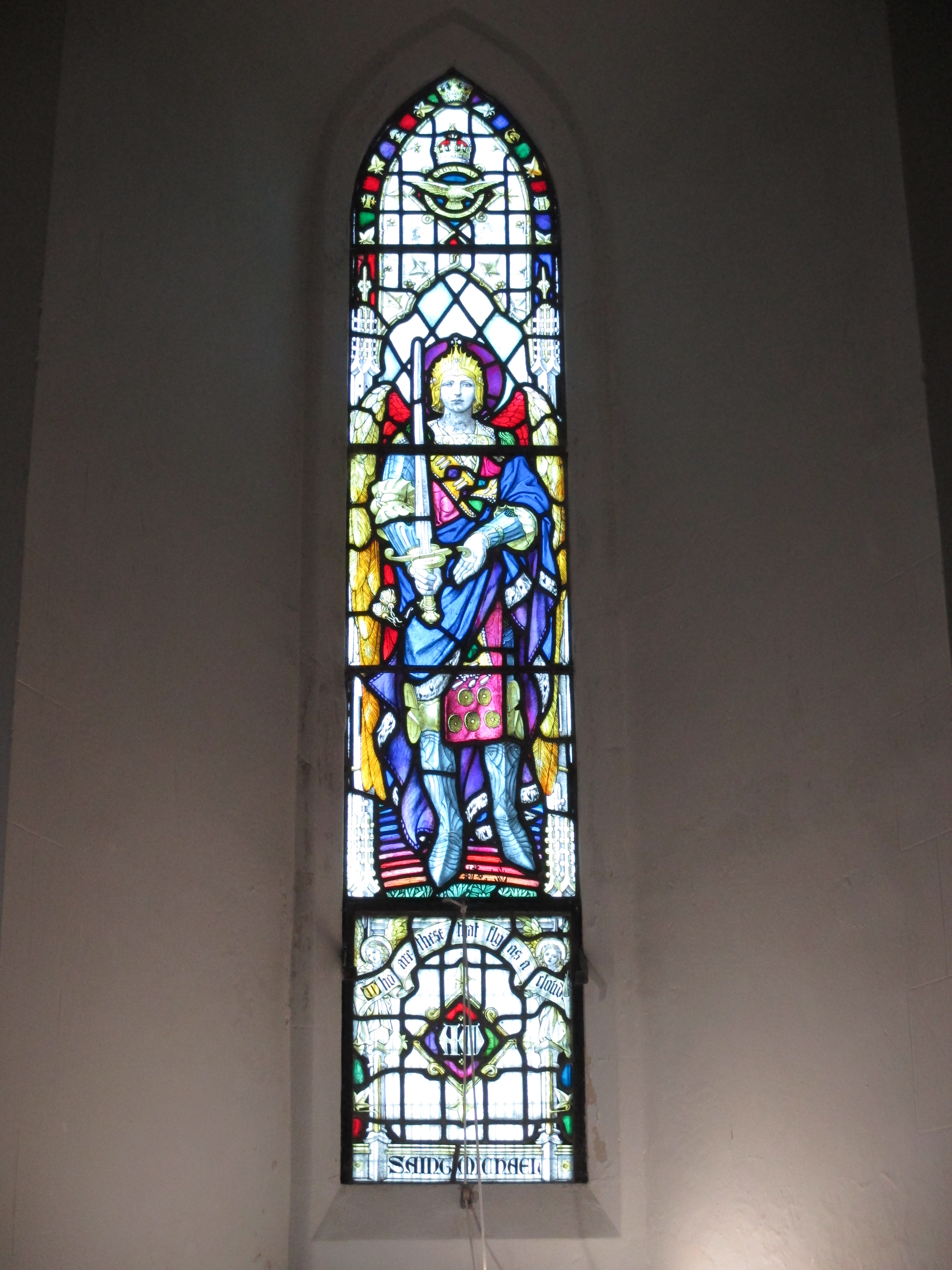
Newtimber north aisle second window

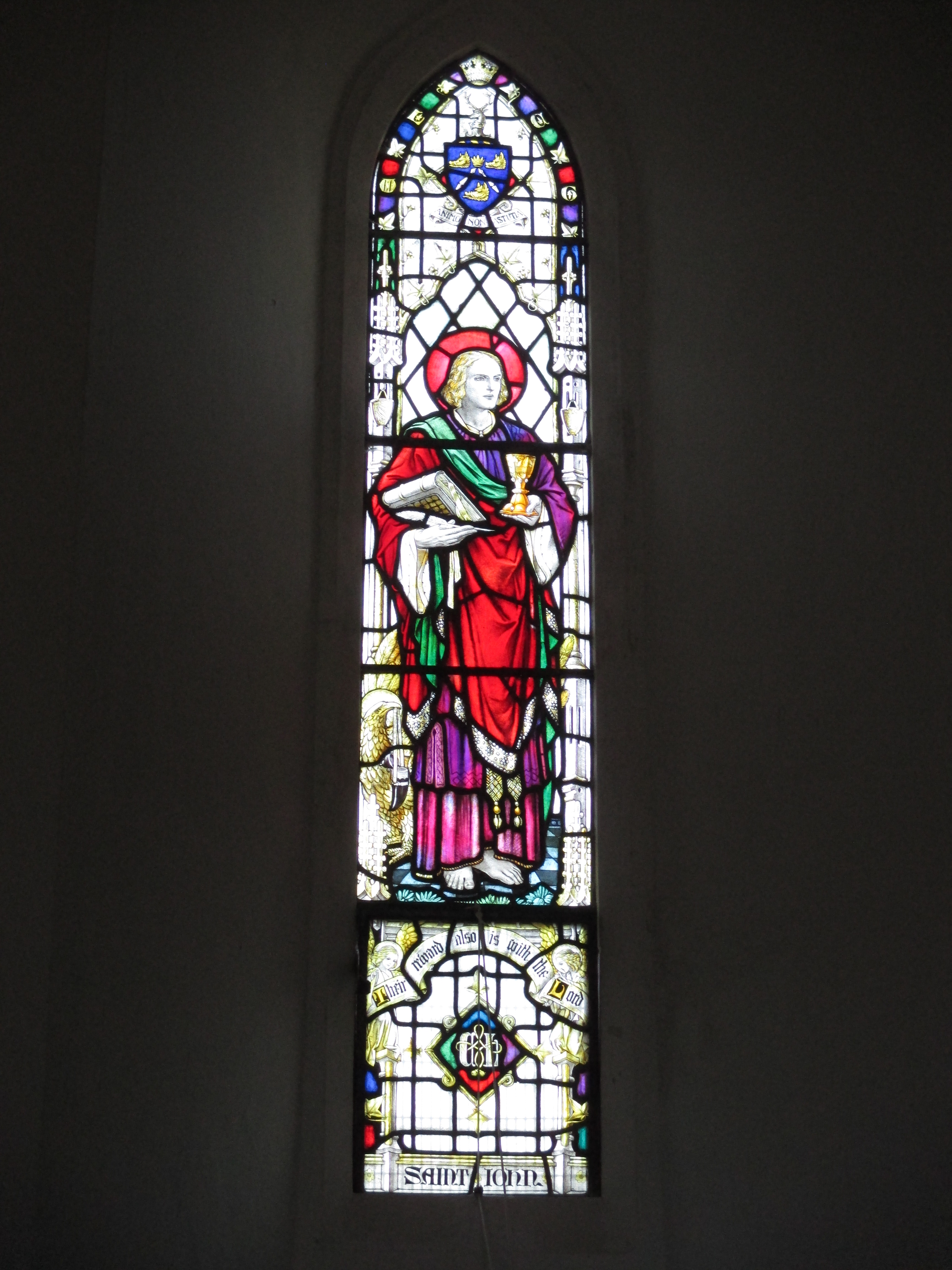
Newtimber north aisle third window

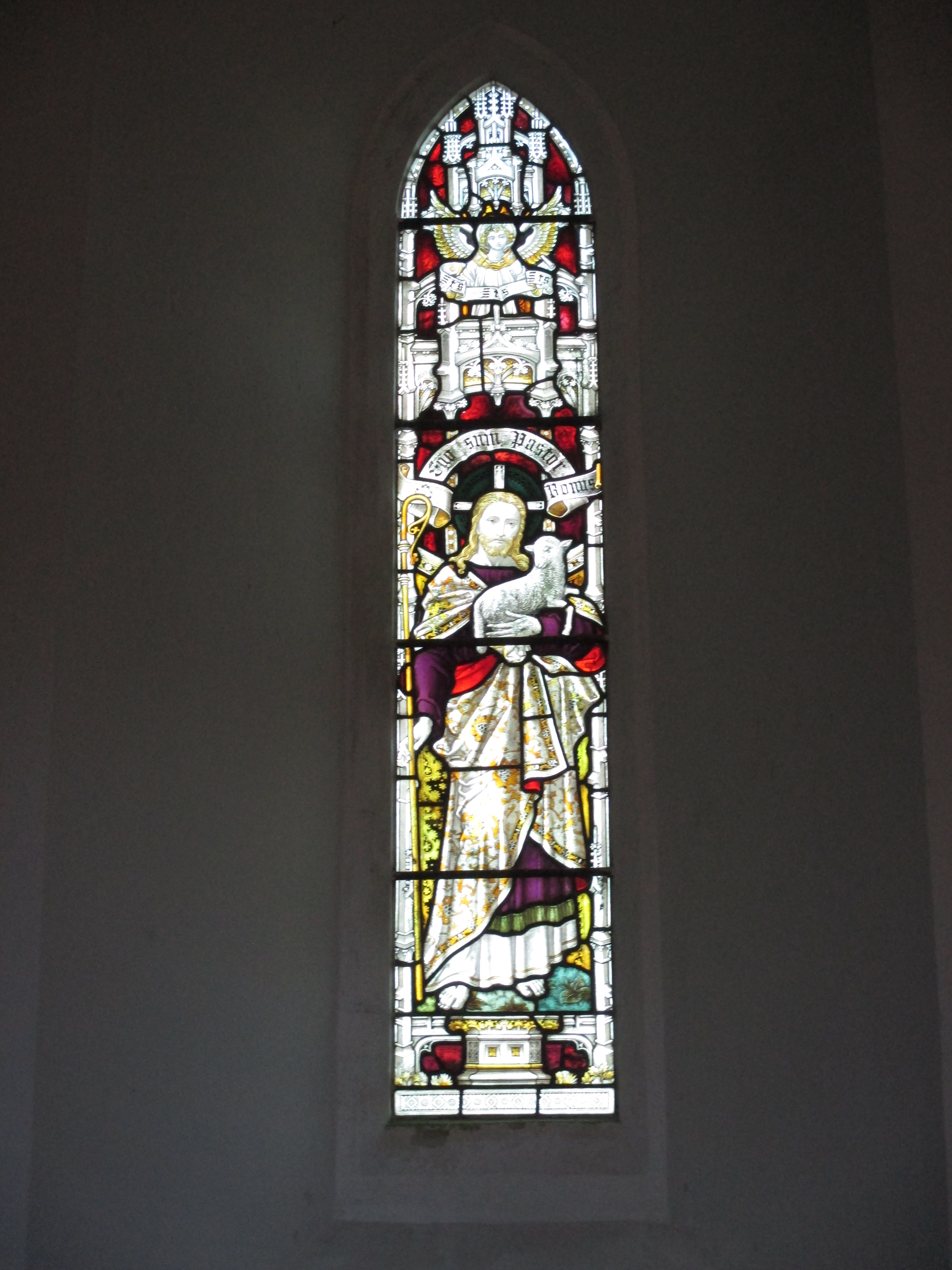
Newtimber north aisle fourth window

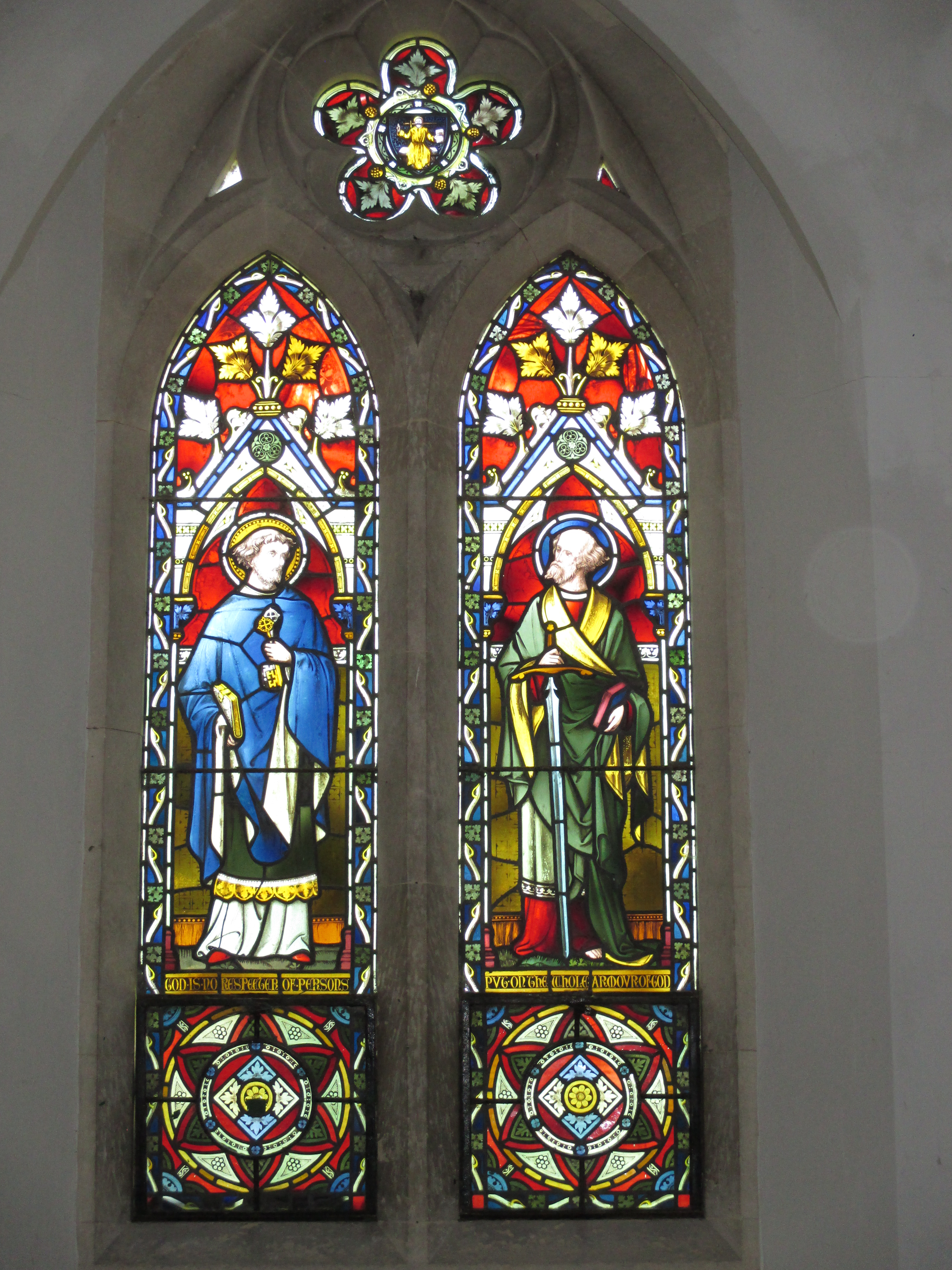
Newtimber north transept window

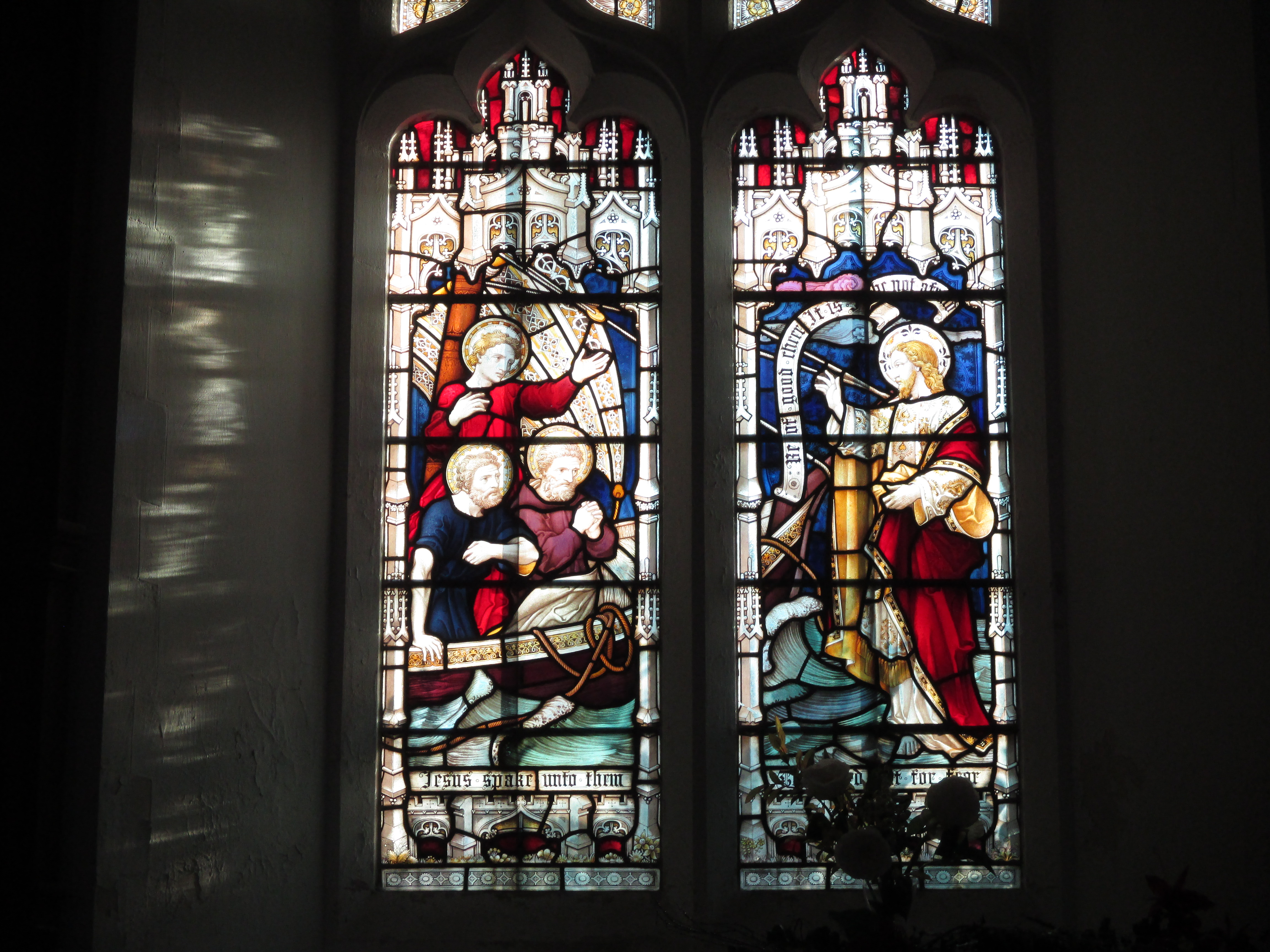
Newtimber south aisle first window

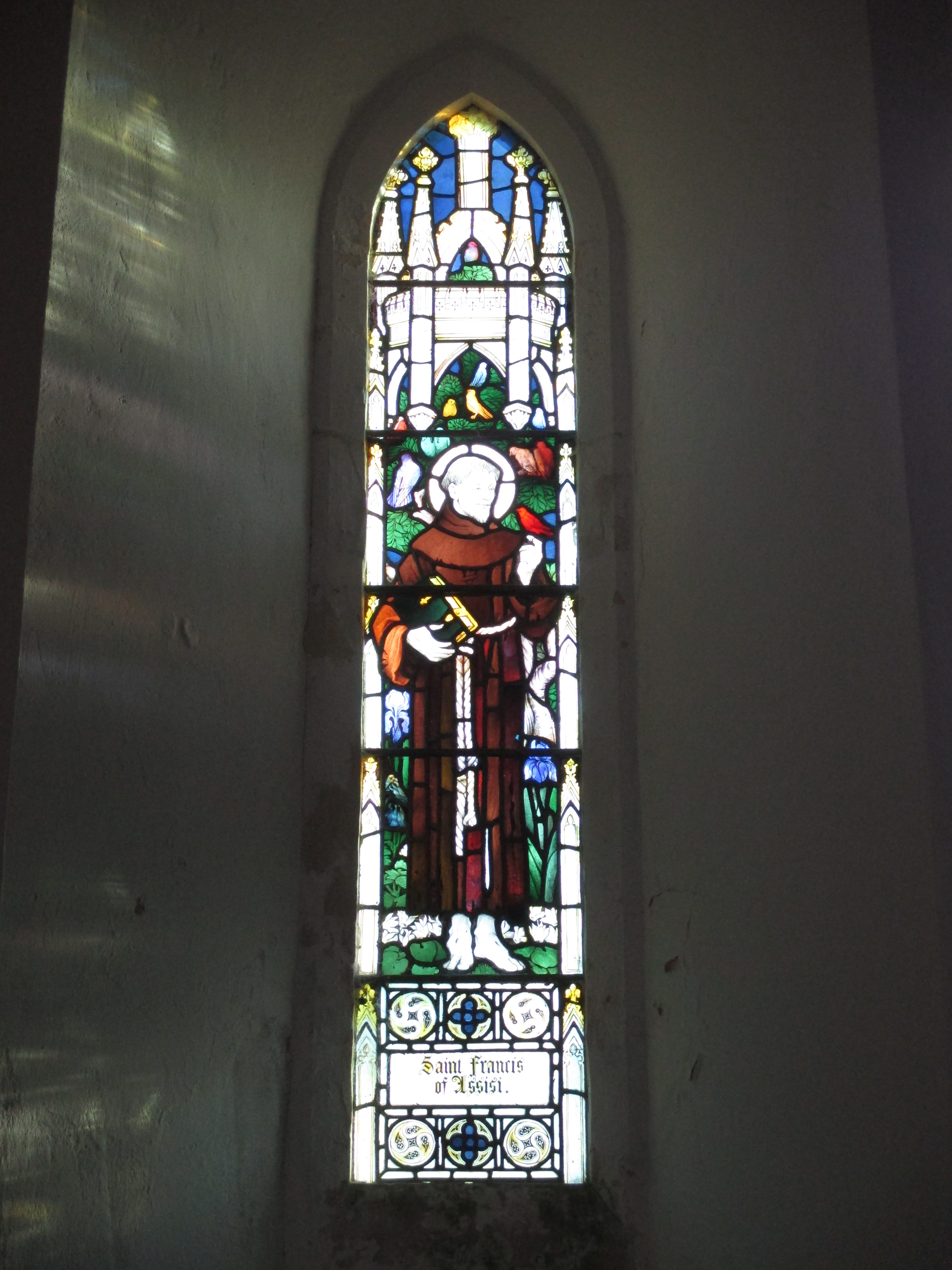
Newtimber south aisle second window

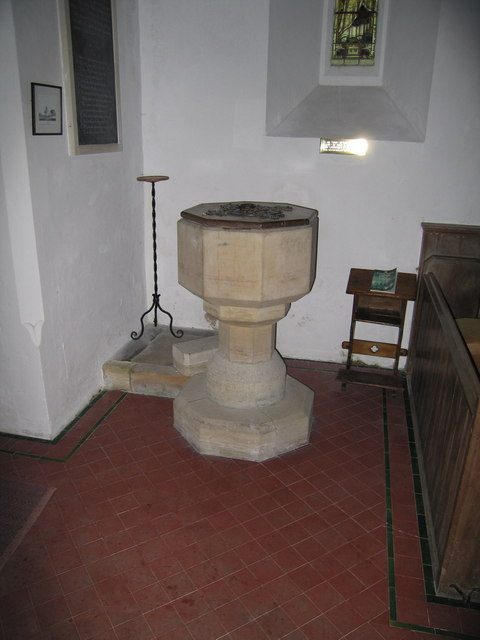
Font - St. John's Church - geograph.org.uk - 604740

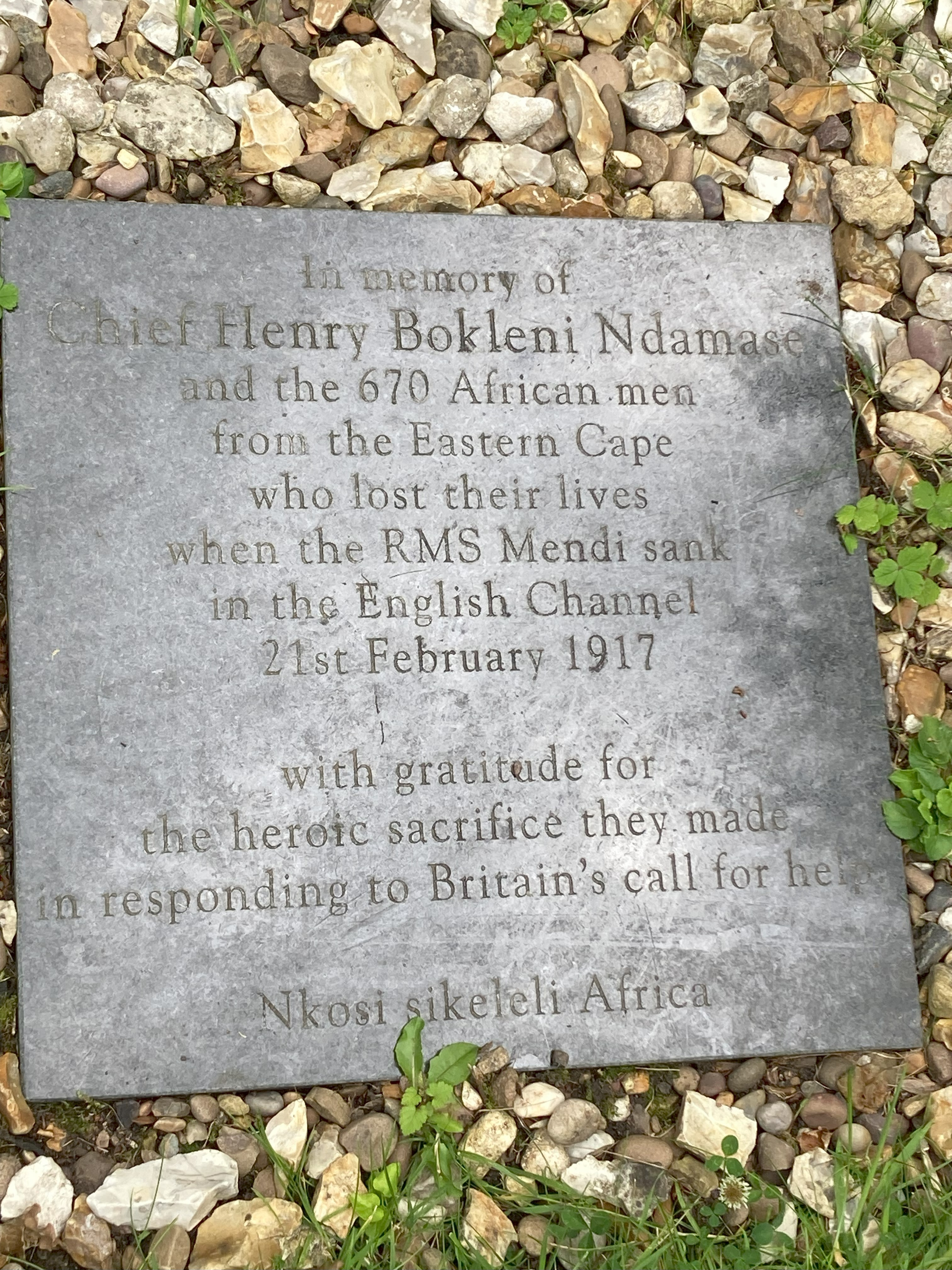
Newtimber Church SS Mendi memorial plaque

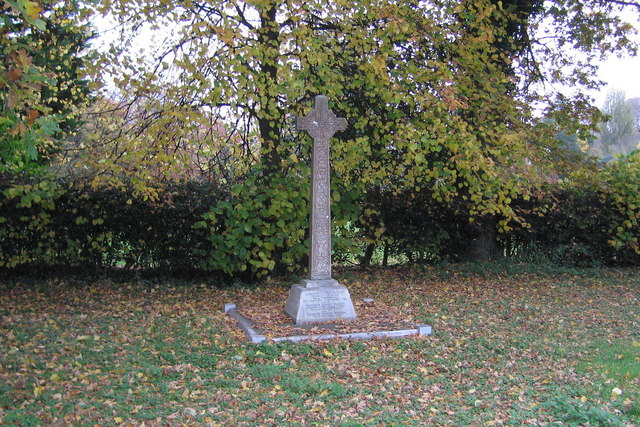
Memorial to the Buxton Family - geograph.org.uk - 604780

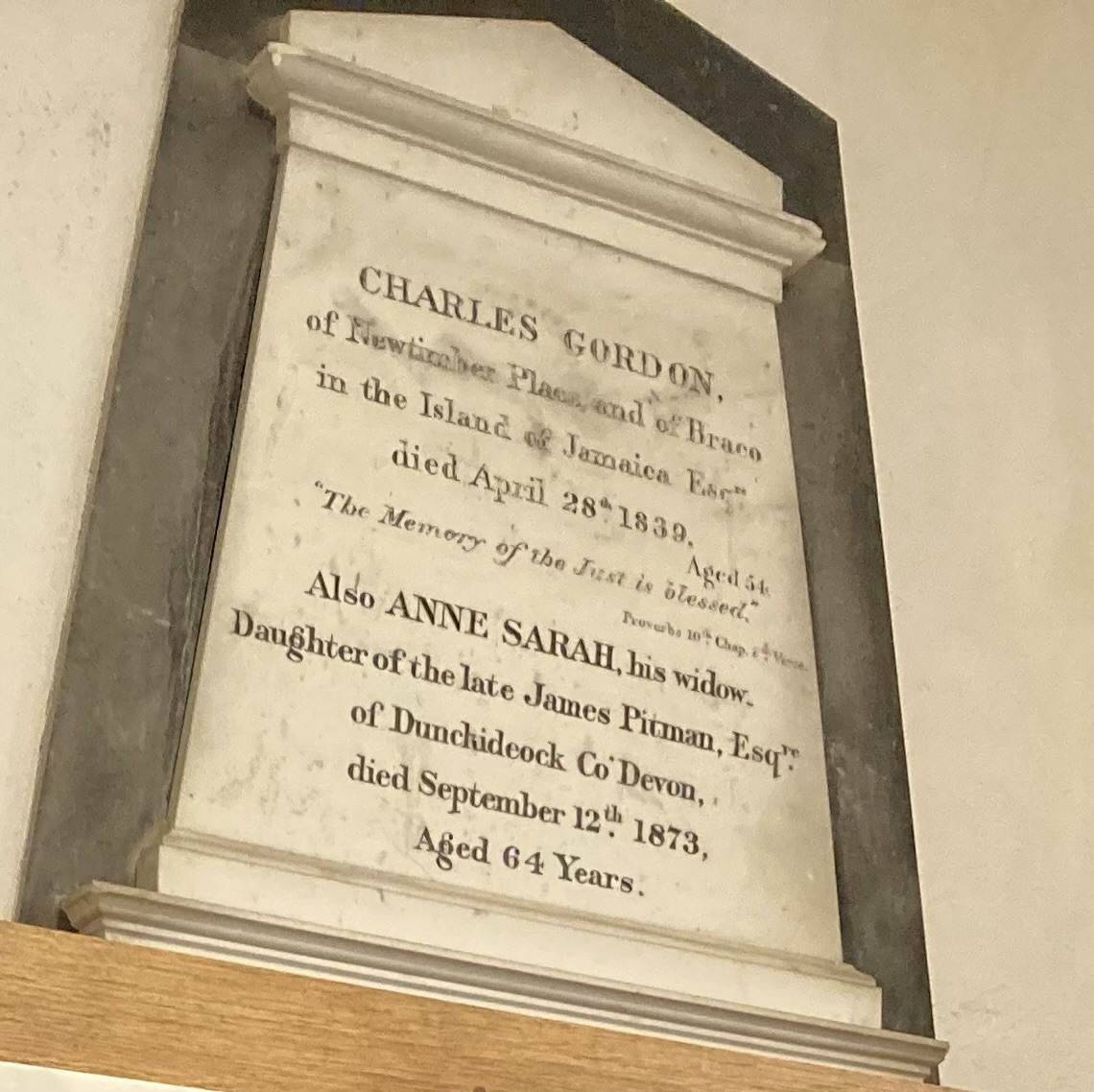
Wall memorial for Charles Gordon of Newtimber Place and of Braco in the island of Jamaica and of Anne Sarah, his widow
