= Monte Santu Padre =

Volcanic mountain in Bortigali, Sardinia, Italy

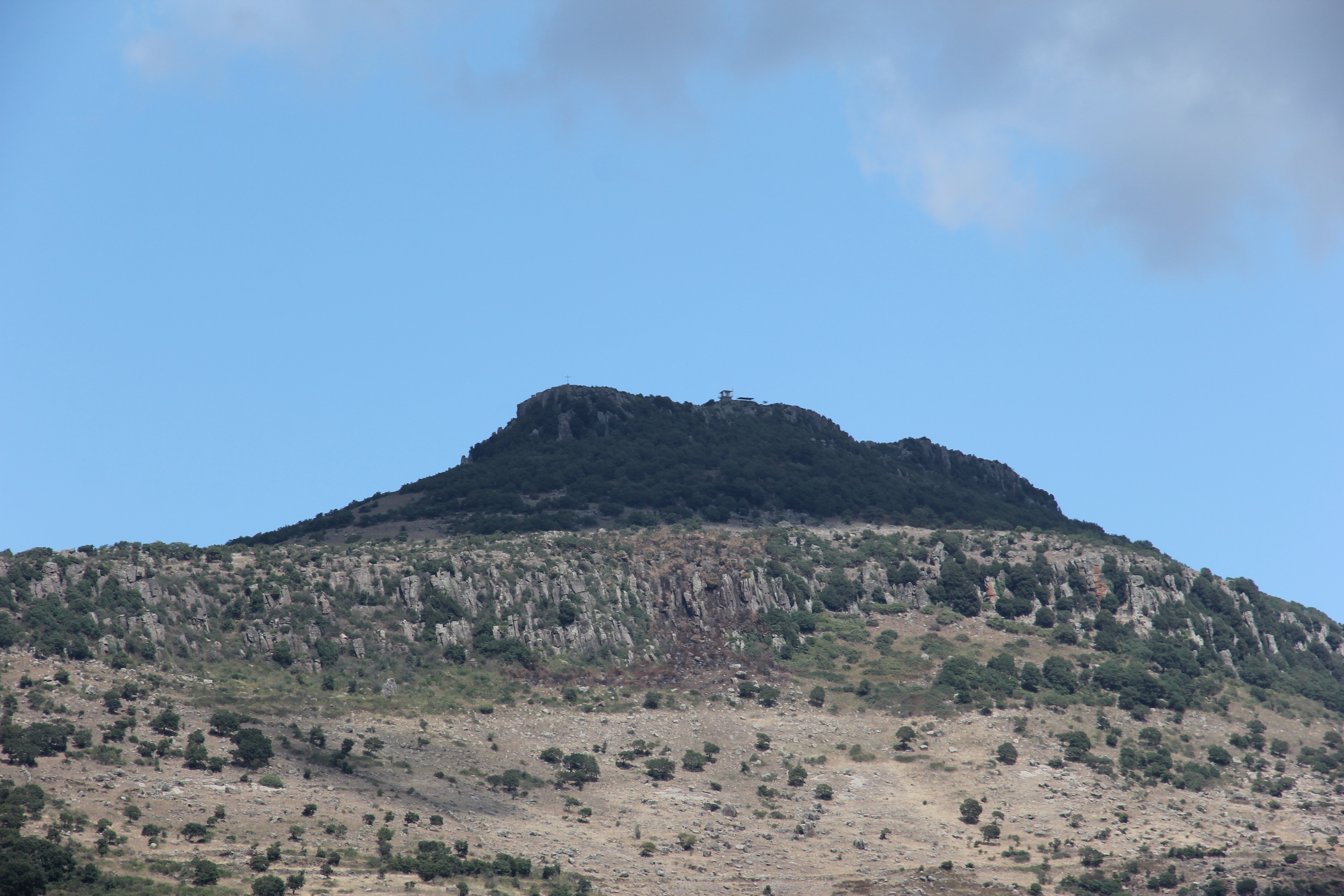

Highest point
- Elevation: 1,025 m (3,363 ft)
- Coordinates: 40°17′52″N 8°50′24″E

Geography
- Country: Italy
- Region: Sardinia
- Parent range: Catena del Marghine

The Monte Santu Padre is one of the highest peaks of the Catena del Marghine, standing at 1,025 meters above sea level. It is located in the territory of Bortigali, in the Province of Nuoro.

== Description ==
It is an ancient volcano whose constituent rocks are basalt, pink and green trachyte, andesite, and rhyolite. From the summit, one can observe a landscape encompassing much of central and southwestern Sardinia, from the Gennargentu to the Sulcis mountains, from the hills of Logudoro to the mountains of the Baronie, as far as the sea at Oristano and Bosa.

=== Origin and meaning of the name ===
It owes its name to an evolution of the ancient toponym "Santu Antipatre," cited in the Condaghe di San Nicolò di Trullas.

=== Flora and fauna ===
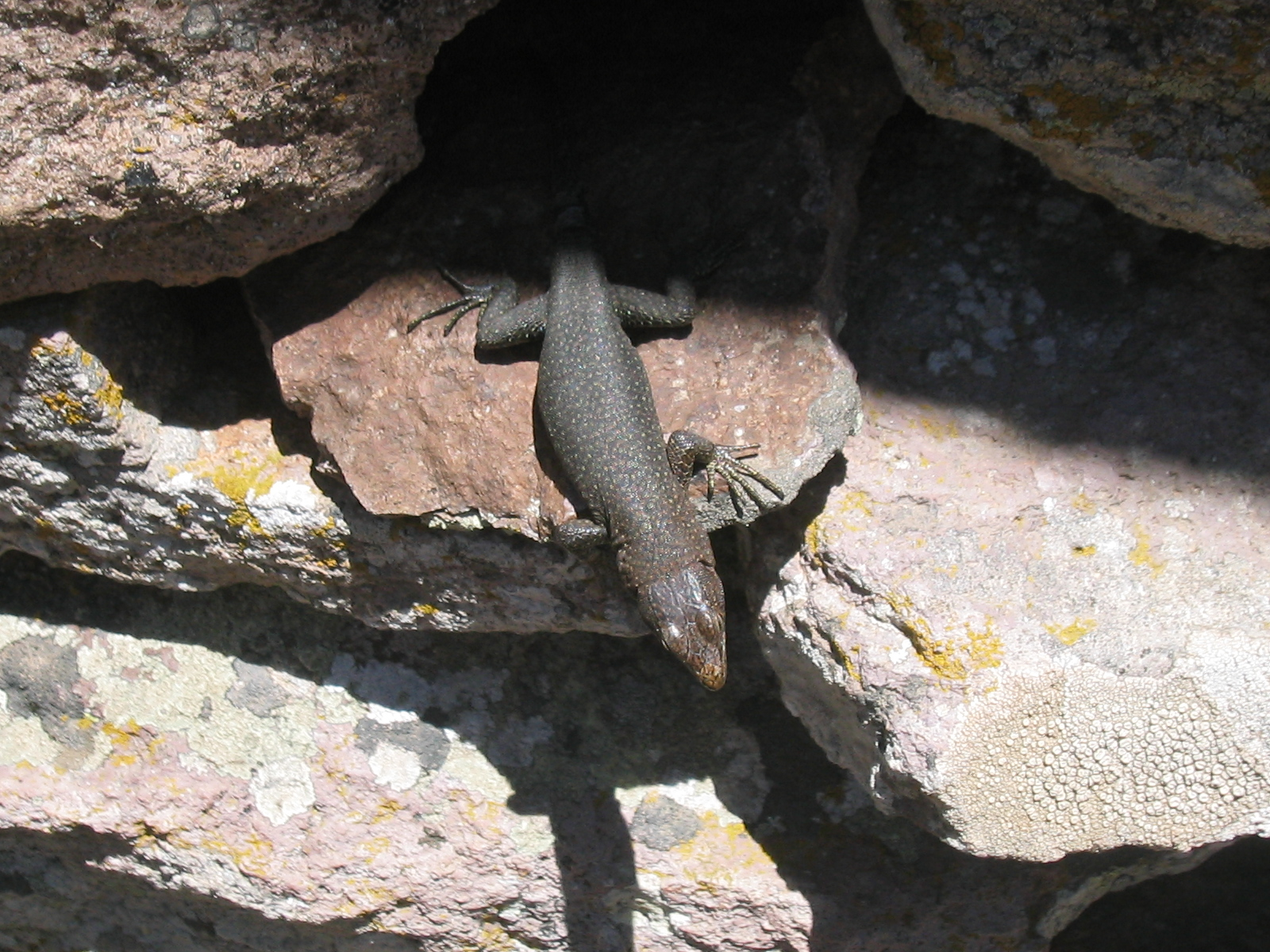
A Bedriaga’s lizard peeks out from the stones of the small shelter hosting the lookouts.

The flora consists of herbs, among which, during spring, blooms of species such as the bug orchid (Anacamptis coriophora ssp. fragrans), the long-horned orchid (Orchis longicornu), the butterfly orchid (Anacamptis papilionacea), and the sawfly orchid (Ophrys tenthredinifera) can be observed, along with numerous other annual or biennial species such as foxglove (Digitalis purpurea). The arboreal flora is represented by downy oaks (Quercus pubescens), holm oaks (Quercus ilex), cork oaks (Quercus suber), wild cherries (Prunus avium), wild apples (Malus sylvestris), hollies (Ilex aquifolium), and Montpellier maples (Acer monspessulanum).

The fauna is represented by species such as the wild boar (Sus scrofa), the fox (Vulpes vulpes ichnusae), the weasel (Mustela nivalis), the Sardinian dormouse (Eliomys quercinus sardus), the pine marten (Martes martes), and the Sardinian wildcat (Felis lybica sarda). Among the rocks, the Bedriaga's lizard (Archaeolacerta bedriagae), a reptile endemic to Sardinia and Corsica, recently reported in this area, can be observed. Among the birds, in addition to common small and medium-sized species, the buzzard (Buteo buteo), the red kite (Milvus milvus), the peregrine falcon (Falco peregrinus), and, rarely, the griffon vulture (Gyps fulvus) can be sighted.

== History ==
On the plateau behind the rocks that crown its summit, the ruins of an ancient church dedicated to Saint Barnabas are visible, whose simulacrum is currently housed in the small church of Saint Anthony, in Bortigali.

During the Second World War, the mountain provided protection against potential air raids on the village of Bortigali, which, partly for this reason, was chosen as the headquarters of the Supreme Command of the Armed Forces of Sardinia.

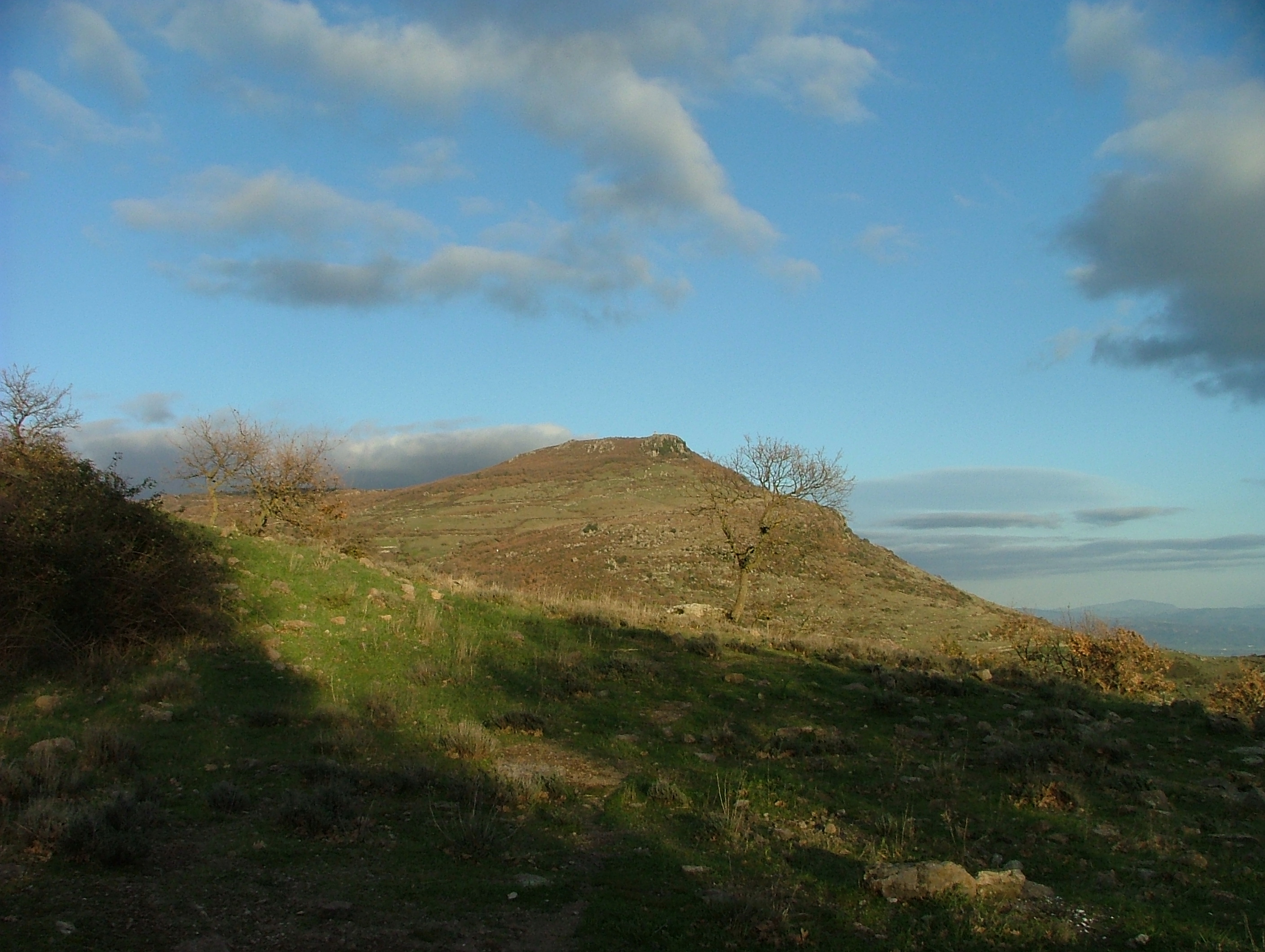
View from the road to Mulargia

== Hiking and paragliding ==
The summit of the mountain can be reached by following an easy hiking trail starting from Bortigali. The route covers a length of 10.5 km (approximately 4 km outbound on the western slope through the localities of Cannarza and Mànigos, and the remaining on the return, descending the eastern slope through the localities of S'atta 'e Suerzu 'e Pala and S'atta 'e sa Prama), overcoming an elevation gain of 510 meters. The trail is equipped with a signage system.

The summit of the mountain has become one of the most sought-after bases for paragliding enthusiasts in Sardinia. On 21 June 2011, the longest flight was made from Bortigali, covering a distance of 74 kilometers.

== See also ==
- Bortigali

== Bibliography ==
- Camarda, Ignazio (1993). Montagne di Sardegna [Mountains of Sardinia] (in Italian). Sassari: Carlo Delfino. p. 50. ISBN 88-7138-072-X.
- Legambiente Macomer (ed.). I Sentieri del Marghine [The Trails of Marghine] (in Italian). Ghilarza: Tipografia ghilarzese. p. 37.
