= Panský diel =

Nature monument in the Podunajské Biskupice district of Bratislava, Slovakia

Coordinates: 48.102263°N 17.159947°E

- IUCN category III (natural monument or feature)
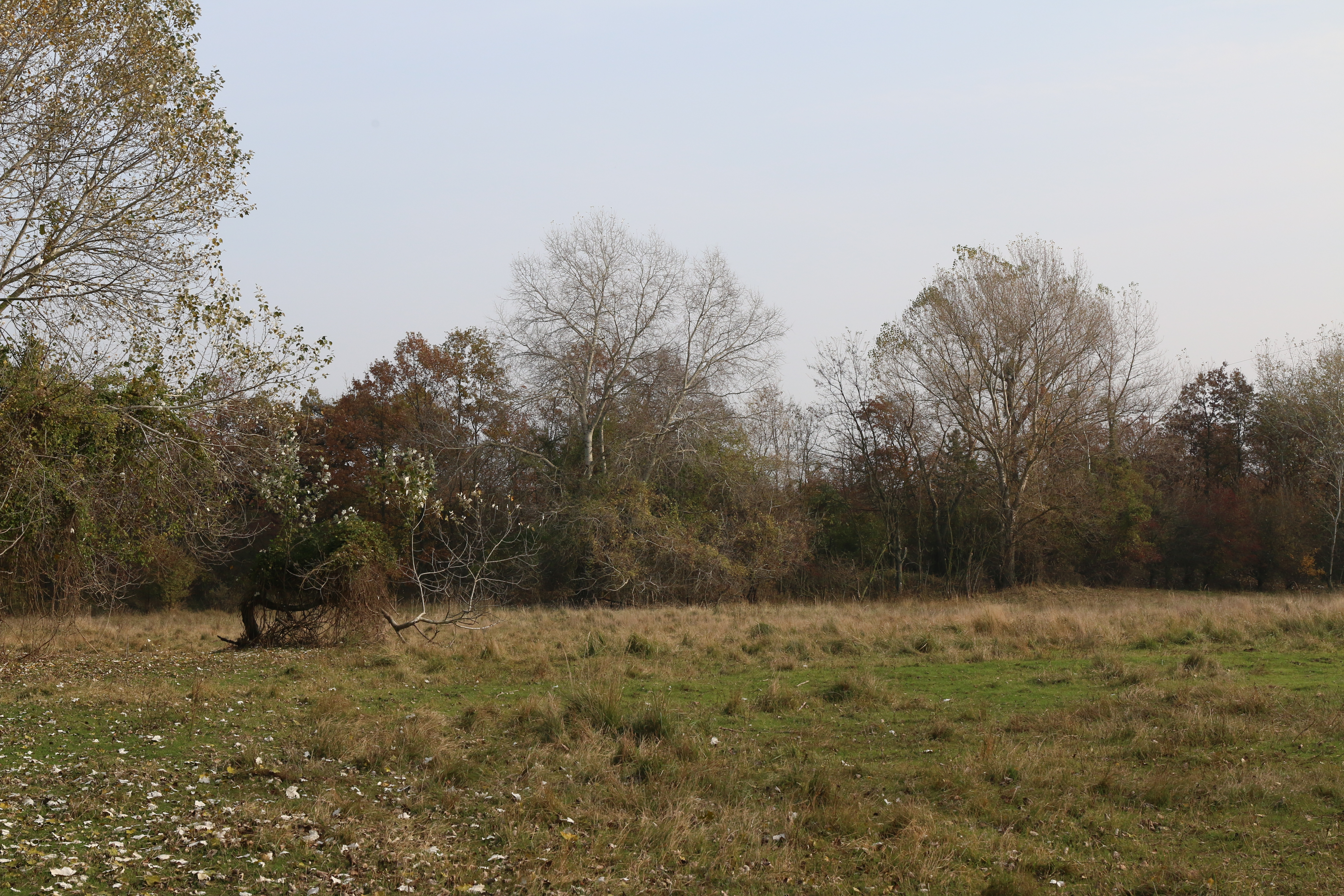
- Interactive map of Panský diel
- Area: 0.156 km^{2} (0.060 sq mi)
- Established: 1990
- Governing body: ŠOP - S-CHKO Dunajské luhy

Panský diel is a nature monument in the Podunajské Biskupice district of Bratislava, Slovakia. The nature monument covers an area of 15,60 ha on the left shore of the Danube. It has a protection level of 4 under the Slovak nature protection system. The protected area is part of the Dunajské luhy Protected Landscape Area.

== Description ==
The area is a part of the Danubian region preserved as a forest-steppe, with the occurrence of different types of critically endangered species of orchids.

== Flora ==
In the protected area various species of orchids occur, including Orchis militaris, Anacamptis coriophora and Anacamptis morio.
