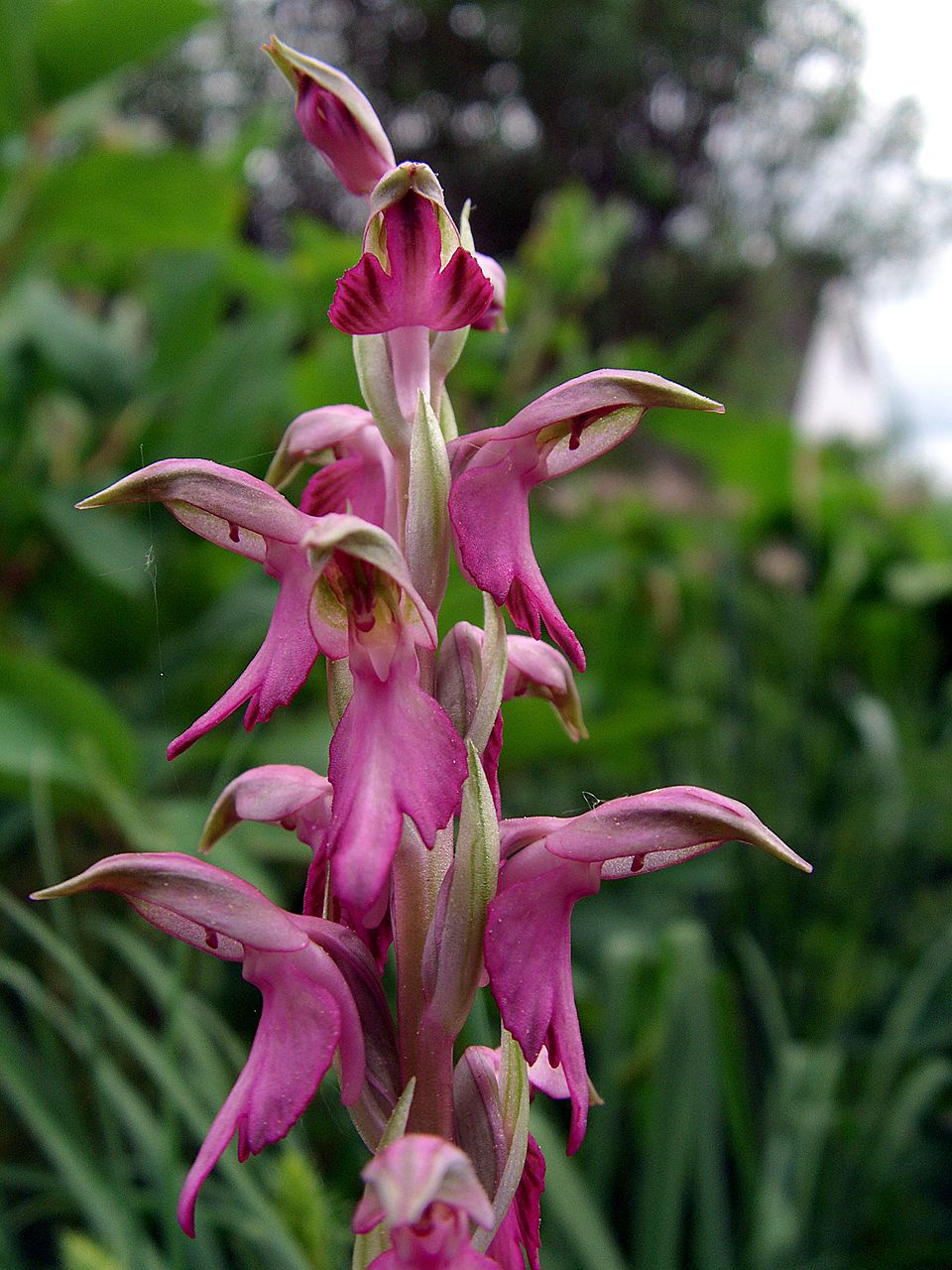

Scientific classification
- Kingdom: Plantae
- Clade: Tracheophytes
- Clade: Angiosperms
- Clade: Monocots
- Order: Asparagales
- Family: Orchidaceae
- Subfamily: Orchidoideae
- Genus: Anacamptis
- Species: A. sancta

Binomial name
- Anacamptis sancta (L.) R.M. Bateman, Pridgeon & M.W.Chase (1997)

Synonyms
- Orchis sancta L. (1759) (Basionym); Anteriorchis sancta (L.) E. Klein & Strack (1989)

= Anacamptis sancta =

Species of flowering plant

Anacamptis sancta, also called the Holy orchid, is a species of orchid closely related to Anacamptis coriophora that is found in the eastern Mediterranean.

== Description ==
The species flowers look similar to A. coriophora but are bigger and more variable in color, from pink to red. The lips of its flowers are unspotted, and most of the leaves are withered by the time the plant flowers.

== Distribution and habitat ==
The species is very local or rare and is found in Turkey, Cyprus, Lebanon, Israel and Aegean Islands, and favors dry and stony ground.
