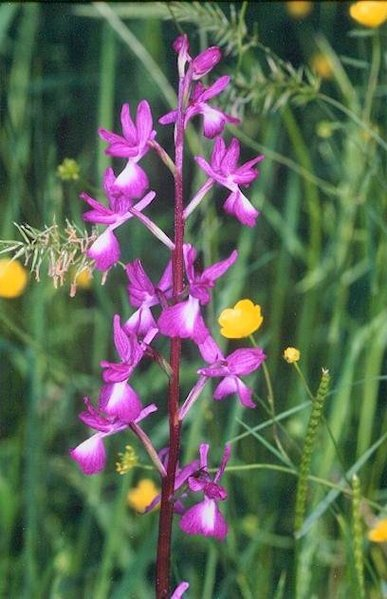

Scientific classification
- Kingdom: Plantae
- Clade: Tracheophytes
- Clade: Angiosperms
- Clade: Monocots
- Order: Asparagales
- Family: Orchidaceae
- Subfamily: Orchidoideae
- Genus: Anacamptis
- Species: A. laxiflora

Binomial name
- Anacamptis laxiflora (Lam.) R.M. Bateman, Pridgeon & M.W. Chase (1997)

Synonyms
- Orchis laxiflora Lam. 1779 (Basionym); Orchis palustris ssp. laxiflora (Lam.) Batt. 1895

= Anacamptis laxiflora =

Species of flowering plant

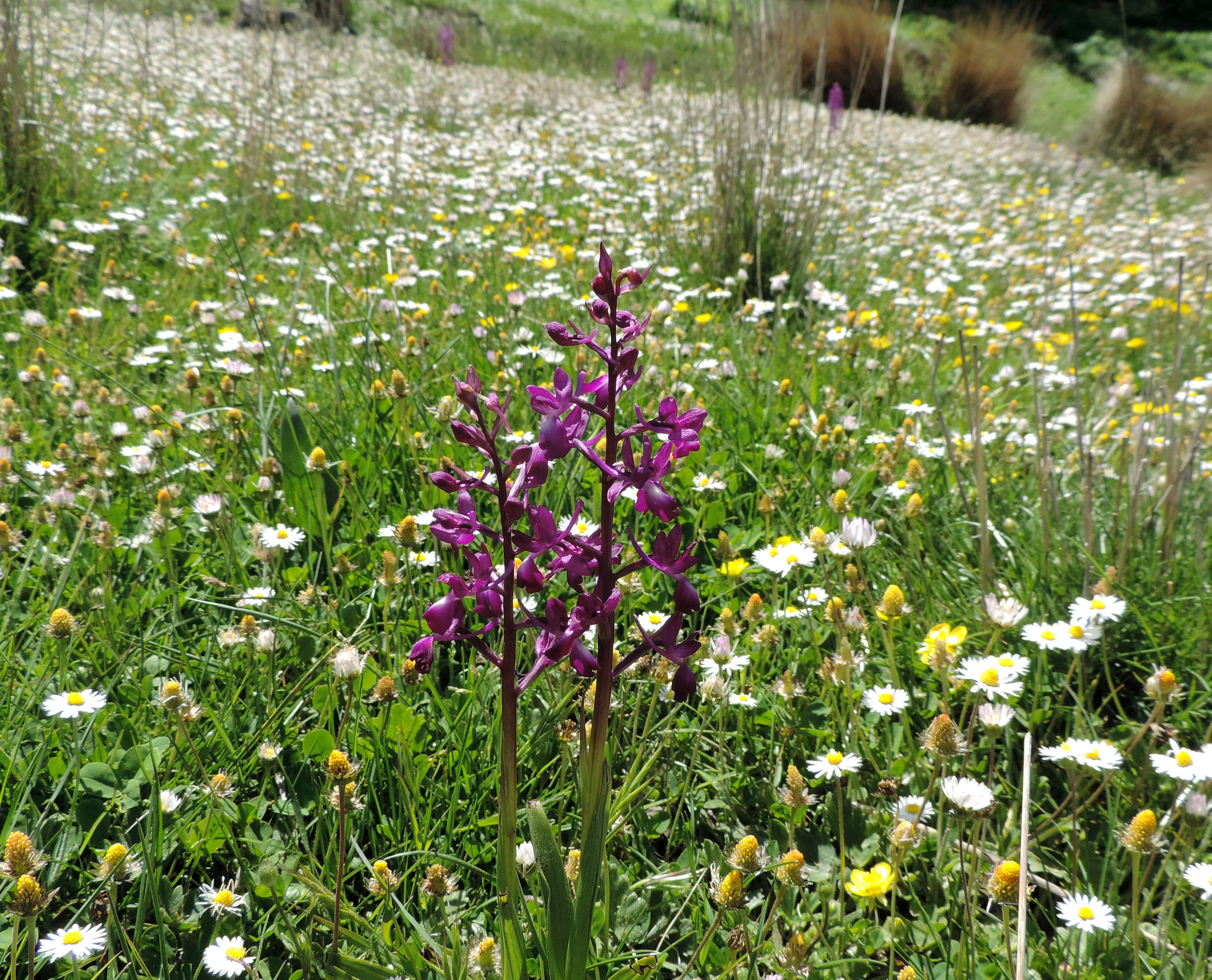
Anacamptis laxiflora, Mount Dikti

Anacamptis laxiflora (lax-flowered orchid, loose-flowered orchid, or green-winged meadow orchid) is a species of orchid. It has a wide distribution in Europe and Asia as far north as in Germany, and is found in wet meadows with alkaline soil. It grows up to 60 cm high. A. laxiflora is common in Normandy and Brittany (France), but in the United Kingdom it is represented only on the Channel Islands, where in Jersey it is called Jersey orchid and in Guernsey it is called Loose Flowered orchid . Notable localities in the Channel Islands include Le Noir Pré meadow in Jersey and several fields at Les Vicheries in Guernsey, where mass blooms of these orchids can be observed from late May to early June.
