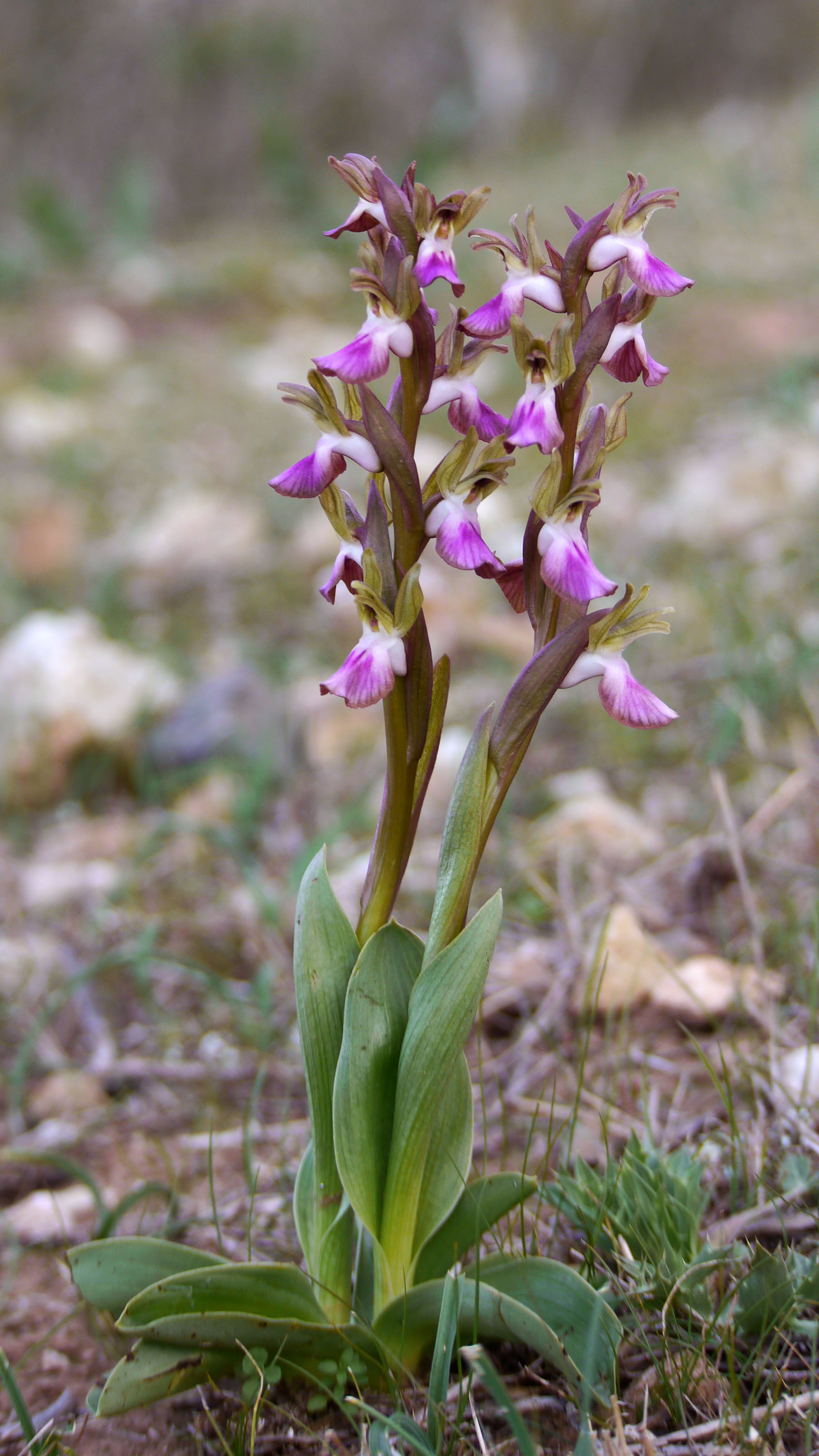

Scientific classification
- Kingdom: Plantae
- Clade: Tracheophytes
- Clade: Angiosperms
- Clade: Monocots
- Order: Asparagales
- Family: Orchidaceae
- Subfamily: Orchidoideae
- Genus: Anacamptis
- Species: A. collina

Binomial name
- Anacamptis collina (Banks & Sol. ex Russell) R.M. Bateman, Pridgeon & M.W.Chase

Synonyms
- Orchis collina Banks & Sol. ex Russell; Barlia collina (Banks & Sol. ex Russell) Szlach.; Herorchis collina (Banks & Sol. ex Russell) D.Tyteca & E.Klein; Vermeulenia collina (Banks & Sol. ex Russell) P.Delforge; Orchis saccata Ten.; Orchis sparsiflora Spruner ex Rchb.f. in H.G.L.Reichenbach; Orchis chlorotica Woronow; Orchis fedtschenkoi Czerniak.; Orchis leucoglossa O.Schwarz; Vermeulenia chlorotca (Woronow) Á.Löve & D.Löve; Vermeulenia fedtschenkoi (Czerniak.) Á.Löve & D.Löve; Vermeulenia saccata (Ten.) Á.Löve & D.Löve; Orchis dulukae Hautz.; Anacamptis dulukae (Hautz.) B.Bock

= Anacamptis collina =

Species of flowering plant

Anacamptis collina, the fan-lipped orchid, is a species of orchid. It is native to the Mediterranean and Caspian Sea regions, from Portugal and Morocco to Iran and Turkmenistan.
