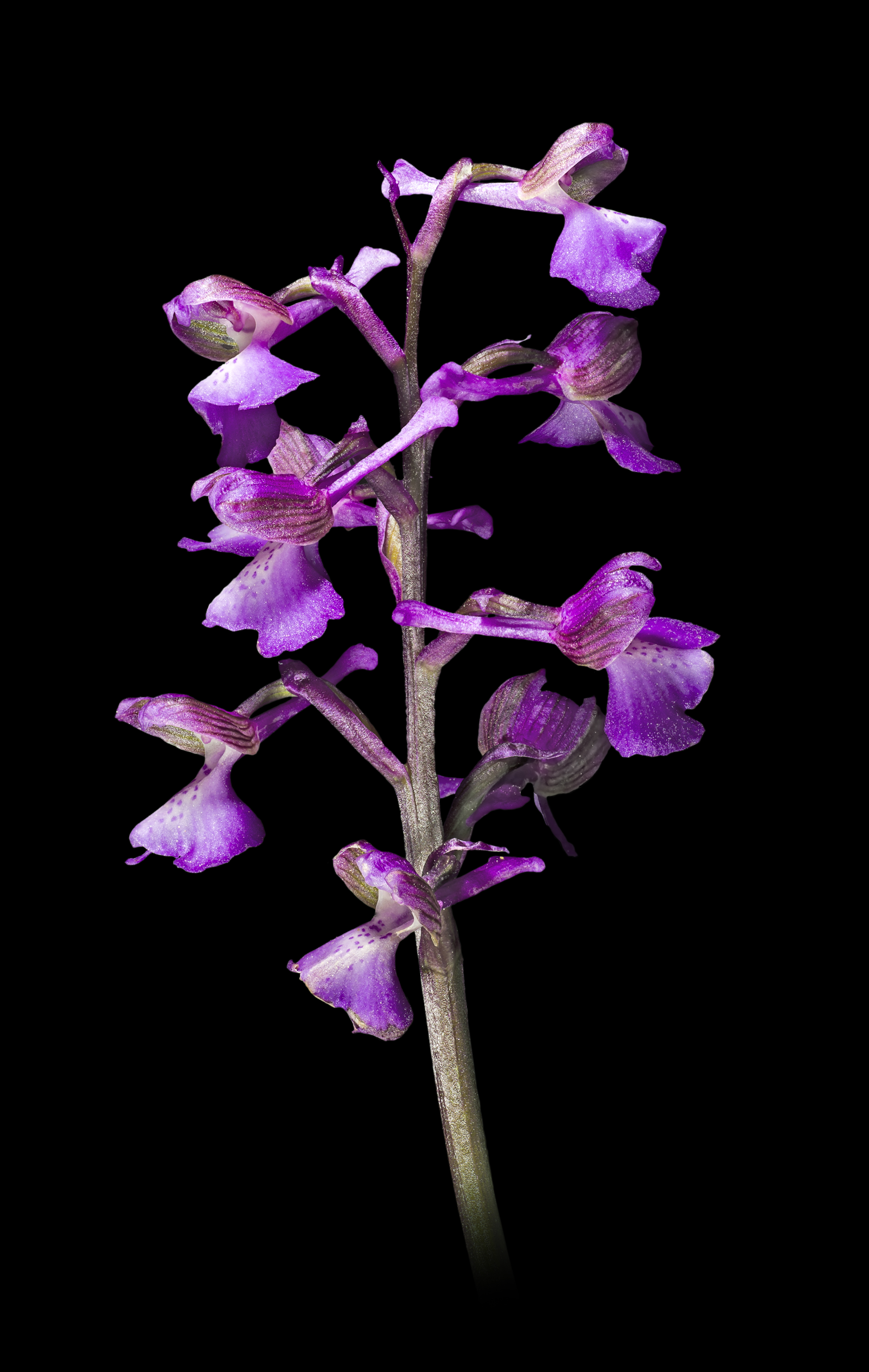

Conservation status
- Near Threatened (IUCN 3.1)

Scientific classification
- Kingdom: Plantae
- Clade: Tracheophytes
- Clade: Angiosperms
- Clade: Monocots
- Order: Asparagales
- Family: Orchidaceae
- Subfamily: Orchidoideae
- Genus: Anacamptis
- Species: A. morio

Binomial name
- Anacamptis morio (L.) R.M.Bateman, Pridgeon & M.W.Chase

Synonyms
- Orchis morio L.; Herorchis morio (L.) D.Tyteca & E.Klein

= Anacamptis morio =

Species of plant

Anacamptis morio, the green-winged orchid or green-veined orchid (synonym Orchis morio), is a flowering plant of the orchid family, Orchidaceae. It usually has purple flowers, and is found in Europe, Northern Africa and western Asia.

== Description ==
It flowers from late April to June in the British Isles, and as early as February in other countries, such as France. The inflorescence is of various colours, mainly purple but ranging from white, through pink, to deep purple. From 5 to 25 helmet-shaped flowers grow in a loose, linear bunch at the top of the single stalk. A pair of lateral sepals with prominent green, occasionally purple veins extend laterally like "wings", giving the orchid its name. The broad, three lobed, lower petal is pale in the center with dark spots.

Leaves are lanceolate, or sometimes ovate, and grow in a rosette around the base of the plan, with some thinner leaves clasping the stem and sheathing almost up to the flowers. Leaves are green and unspotted. Plants grow to 40 cm in height.

It is similar in appearance to the early purple orchid Orchis mascula, which flowers around the same time of year, but Anacamptis morio has green stripes on the two lateral sepals, and lacks the spots or blotches of the Early Purple's leaves.

Individual plants may flower for up to 17 years.

== Taxonomy ==
The species was first described, as Orchis morio, by Carl Linnaeus, in 1753. It was transferred to the genus Anacamptis in 1997. Anacamptis comes from the Greek ανακάμτειν "anakamptein" which means to bend, although according to different sources it may mean to bend backward, to bend down or to bend forward. The name morio is Latin for "clown", which its striped and spotted flowers were held to resemble.

== Subspecies ==
As of May 2014, the World Checklist of Selected Plant Families accepts six subspecies:

- Anacamptis morio subsp. caucasica
- Anacamptis morio subsp. champagneuxii
- Anacamptis morio subsp. longicornu (syn: Anacamptis longicornu) — western Mediterranean region.
- Anacamptis morio subsp. morio
- Anacamptis morio subsp. picta
- Anacamptis morio subsp. syriaca

== Distribution and habitat ==
It is a native of western Eurasia, ranging from Europe to Iran, and Northern Africa from Morocco to Tunisia. In the British Isles it is found in central-southern England, Wales and Ireland.

It grows in unimproved grassy meadows, especially on limestone-rich soil. This species thrives where grass is cut once or twice a year after flowering is complete, or where it is grazed after flowering is complete. Cutting or mowing should not take place immediately after flowering but give time for seed dispersal.

It can grow in dry or wet grazed meadows. It can also be found in coastal grasslands, quarries, churchyards, as well as on roadsides and lawns. On the European continent it is also found in alpine pasture and in xerothermic grassland on porphyry outcrops.

The maximum altitude for this species is somewhere between 1500 and 2000m.

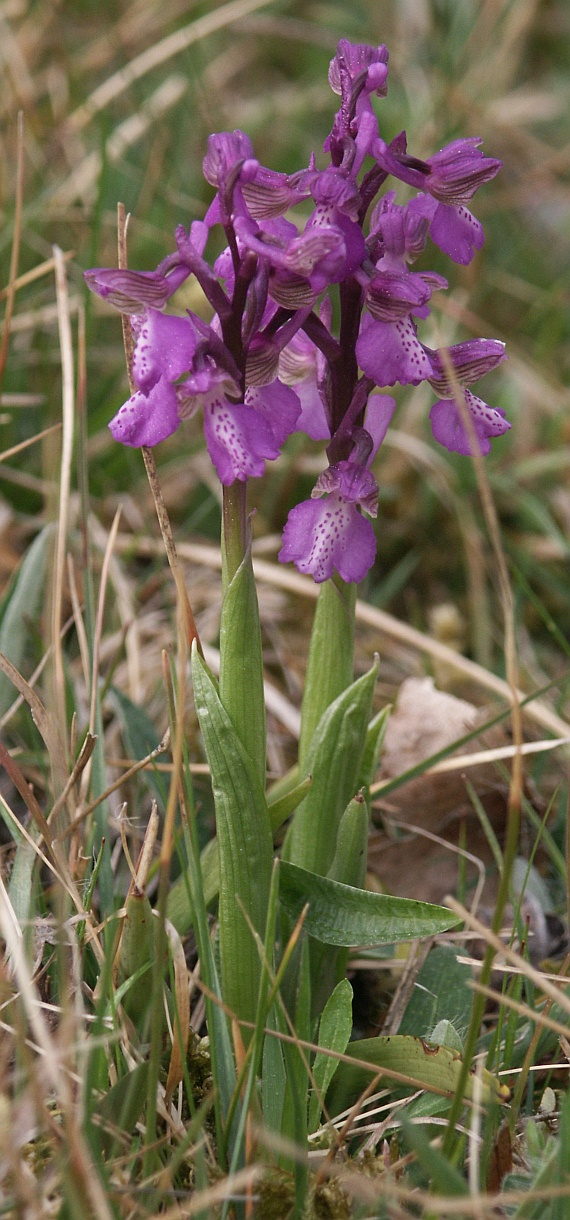
In bloom in meadow habitat

== Ecology ==
Pollination is by bees.

The flowers do not produce nectar, but can attract pollinators with their visual appearance. This nectar deception "facilitates the mixing of pollen between different individual plants, promotes genetic diversity in the species, and has been favored evolutionarily over nectar production."

Plants cannot establish without a mycorrhizal partner. This makes them vulnerable to chemicals, particularly fungicides, but also other chemical applications, including fertilisers, which could reduce the prevalence of particular species of fungi. Mycorrhizal fungi known to grow in association with the green-winged orchid include Epulorhiza repens (Tulasnellaceae) and Moniliopsis solani (Ceratobasidiaceae).

== Conservation ==
This species' conservation status is vulnerable and near threatened.

It is a protected species in Northern Ireland under the Wildlife (NI) Order of 1985.

In 2001 Anacamptis morio was adopted as the logo for Priory Vale, the third and final instalment in Swindon's 'Northern Expansion' project. Due to a rapid decline in the species they are protected in certain cases, although still regarded as being quite common in the Swindon area, especially Clifford Meadow, a Site of Special Scientific Interest (SSSI) off Thamesdown Drive, Swindon.

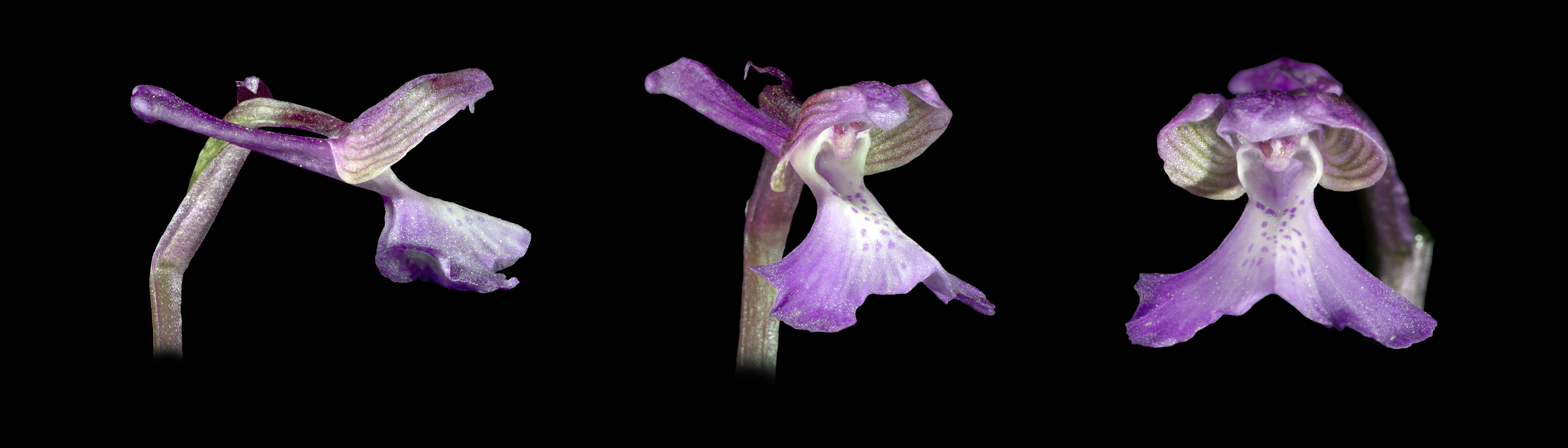
Flower
