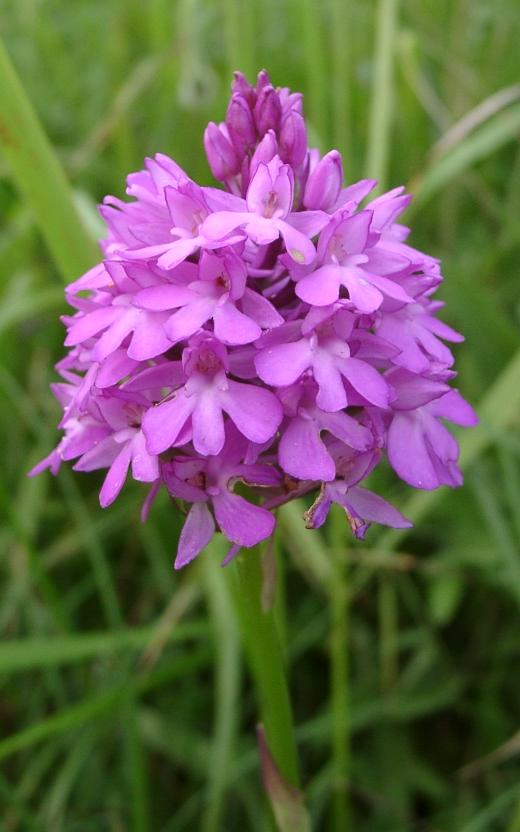

Conservation status
- Least Concern (IUCN 3.1)

Scientific classification
- Kingdom: Plantae
- Clade: Tracheophytes
- Clade: Angiosperms
- Clade: Monocots
- Order: Asparagales
- Family: Orchidaceae
- Subfamily: Orchidoideae
- Genus: Anacamptis
- Species: A. pyramidalis

Binomial name
- Anacamptis pyramidalis (L.) Rich.

Synonyms
- Anacamptis condensata Koch; Orchis appendiculata Stokes; Orchis bicornis Gilib.; Orchis condensata Desf.

= Anacamptis pyramidalis =

Species of plant

Anacamptis pyramidalis, the pyramidal orchid, is a perennial herbaceous plant belonging to the genus Anacamptis of the family Orchidaceae. The scientific name Anacamptis derives from Greek ανακάμτειν 'anakamptein' meaning 'bend forward', while the Latin name pyramidalis refers to the pyramidal form of the inflorescence.

== Description ==
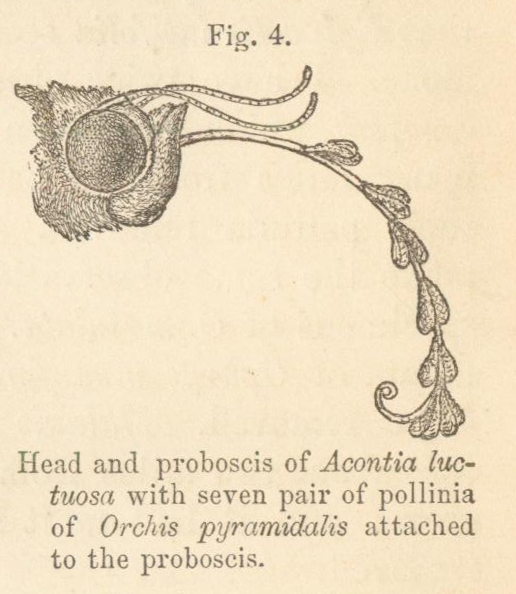
Charles Darwin's book Fertilisation of Orchids included an illustration of the head of a moth with its proboscis laden with several pairs of pollinia from Orchis pyramidalis

This hardy plant reaches on average 10–25 centimetres (3.9–9.8 in) of height, with a maximum of 60 centimetres (24 in). The stem is erect and unbranched. The basal leaves are linear-lanceolate with parallel venation, up to 25 centimetres (9.8 in) long, the cauline ones are shorter and barely visible on the stem. The arrangement of hermaphroditic flowers in a compact pyramidal shape is very distinctive and gives the orchid its common name. The colour of the flower varies from pink to purple, or rarely white, and the scent is described as "foxy". The flowers have six tepals, being three small sepals and three petals. Two small petals are on the sides, while the third and lower (labellum) is large and trilobate. At the back of the flower there is a tubular spur of about 1.5 centimetres (0.59 in) long, while the labellum bears two lateral small flaps. The flowering period extends from April through July.

== Habitat and distribution ==
Anacamptis pyramidalis requires a sunny spot on diverse soils: loamy or clay. It can even grow on very alkaline soil. It can be found on meadows, in grassland, sand dunes, maquis as well as dry and well exposed slopes, at an altitude of 0–1,600 metres or more (0–5,250 ft approx.) above sea level.

In the UK, Anacamptis pyramidalis is a very successful coloniser of disturbed soil, and can grow in a wide variety of locations, including road verges, reservoirs, quarries and airfields.

This orchid is native to southwestern Eurasia, from western Europe through the Mediterranean region eastwards to Iran. In Germany, it is rare and was declared Orchid of the Year in 1990 to heighten awareness of this plant. This orchid is especially common on the Isle of Wight in the South of England, and was designated the county plant in 2008. On the Isle of Wight, it favours growth in chalky or sandstone-rich soil, and thus can easily be found on the Downland and cliffs to the west and south of the island.

== Ecology ==
The flowers are pollinated by butterflies and moths. To ensure the fertilization, their morphology is well adapted to the proboscis of Lepidoptera, especially Euphydryas, Melanargia, Melitaea, Pieris and Zygaena species. The mechanism by which its pairs of pollinia attach themselves to an insect's proboscis was discovered by Charles Darwin and described in his book on the Fertilisation of Orchids.

Anacamptis pyramidalis has been suggested to form mycorrhizal relationships with Rhizoctonia, Fusarium and Papulaspora species.

== Gallery ==
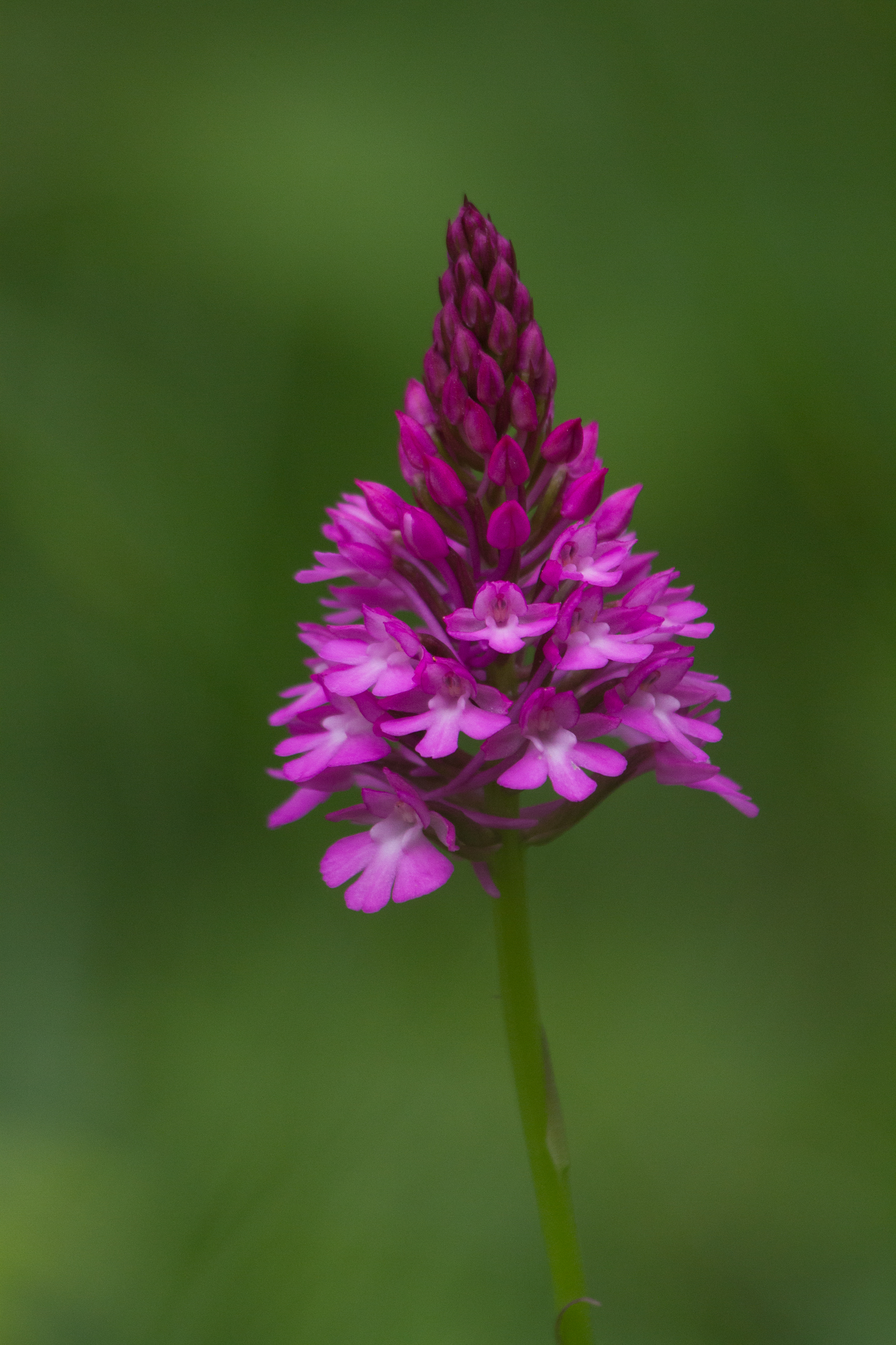
Inflorescences of Anacamptis pyramidalis

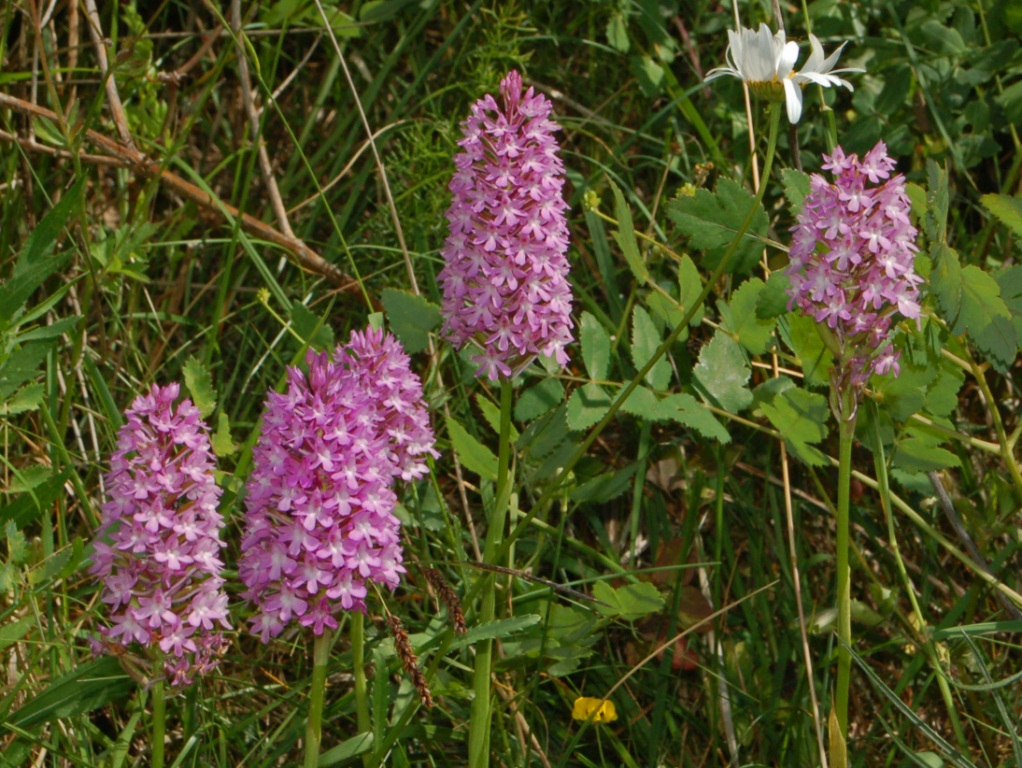
Plants of Anacamptis pyramidalis

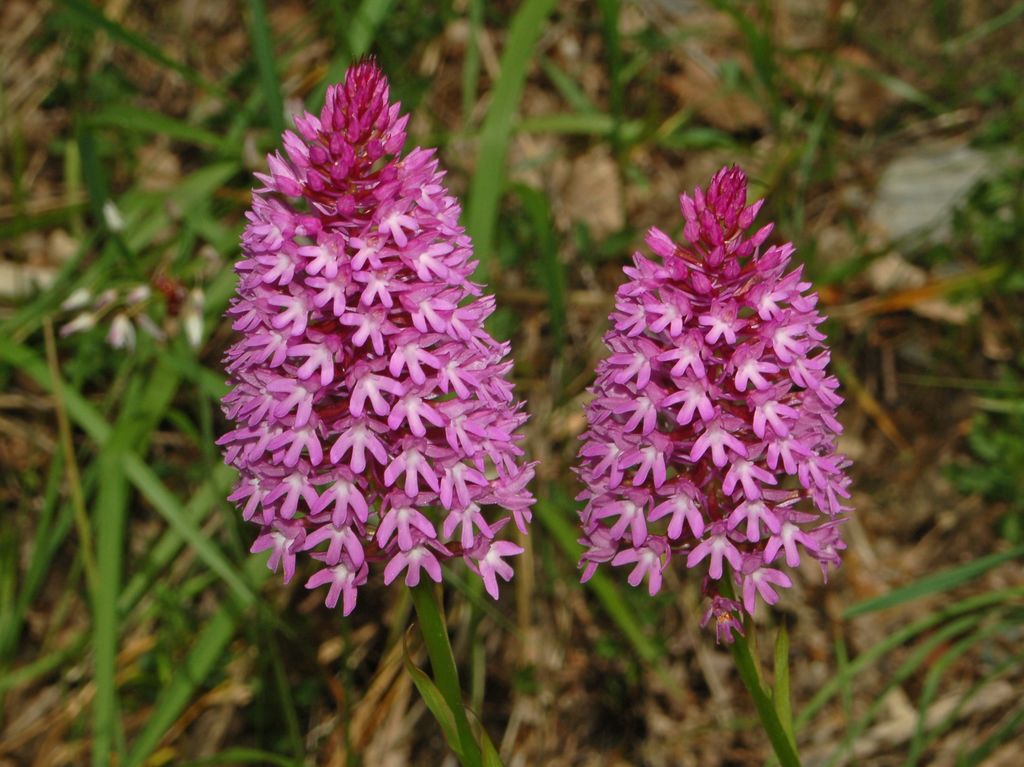
Inflorescences of Anacamptis pyramidalis

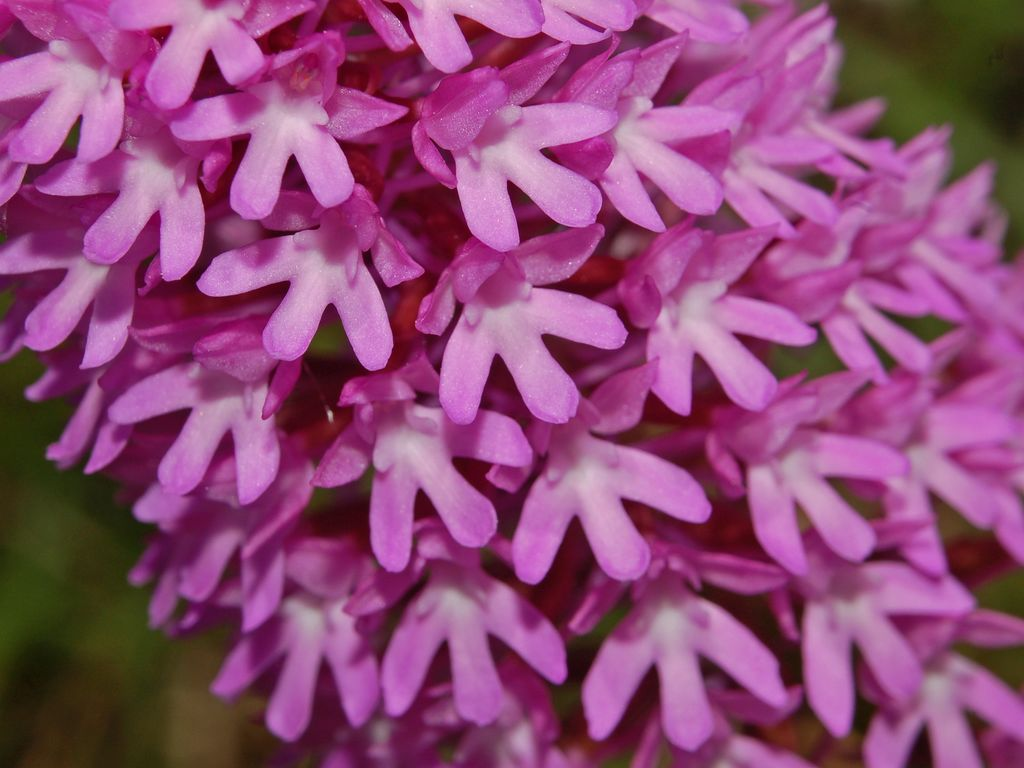
Close-up on inflorescence of Anacamptis pyramidalis

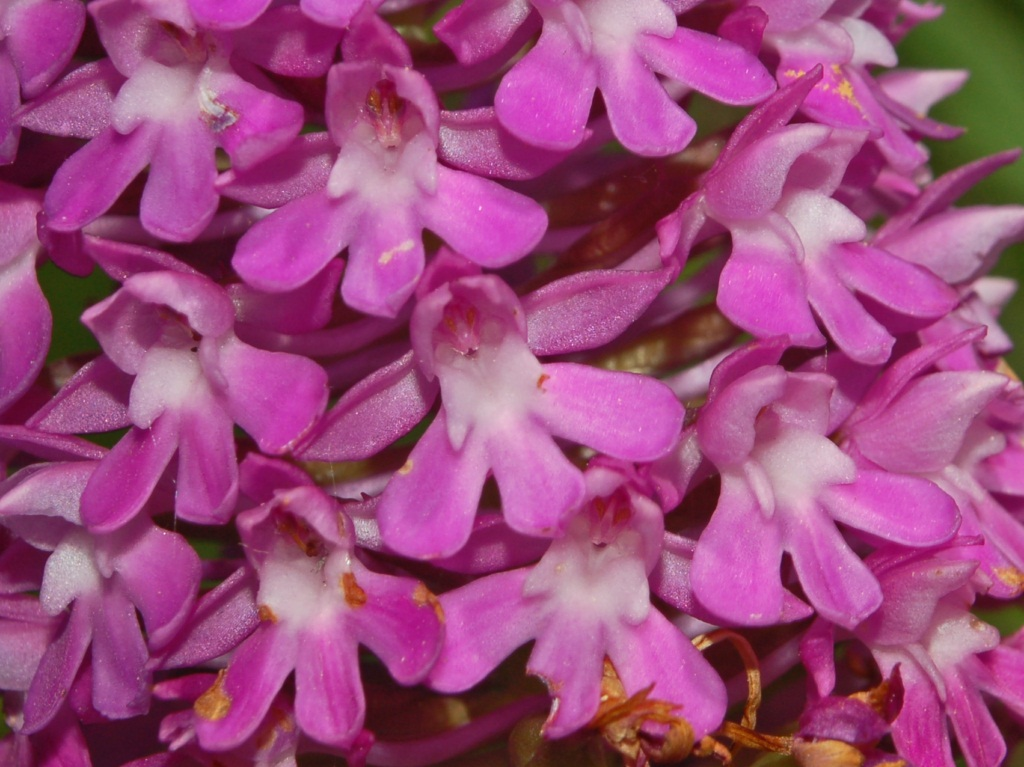
Close-up on a flower of Anacamptis pyramidalis

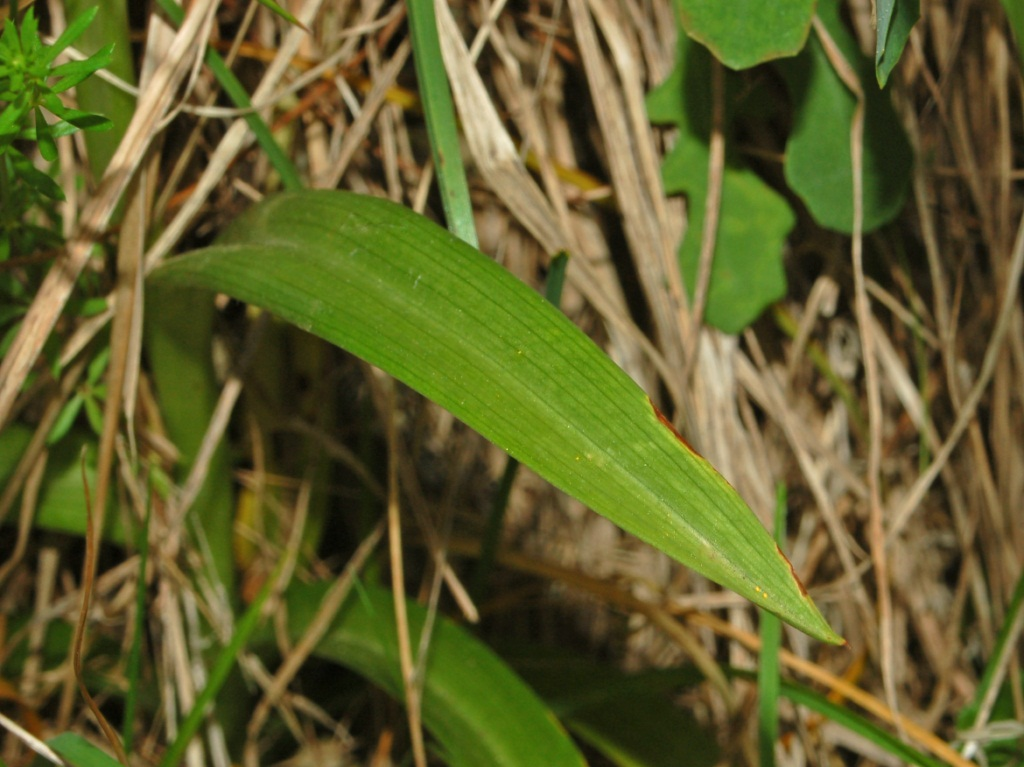
Leaf of Anacamptis pyramidalis

== Varieties ==
There are some notable varieties, which are sometimes treated as subspecies – and as they seem to be limited to certain regions, this may be correct:

- Anacamptis pyramidalis var. tanayensis (Chenevard) Soó in Keller – Tanay Pyramidal Orchid - Flowers darker and smaller. Fribourg and Valais cantons (Switzerland).
- Anacamptis pyramidalis var. urvilleana (Sommier & Caruana Gatto) Schlechter – Maltese Pyramidal Orchid, an endemic orchid from Malta with smaller and paler flowers flowering four–six weeks before Anacamptis pyramidalis.
- Anacamptis pyramidalis var. sanguinea (Druce) Kreutz – Western Irish Pyramidal Orchid. -Inflorescence rounder, plant smaller overall. County Galway to County Kerry (Ireland)

The variety alba can be found anywhere in the Pyramidal Orchid's range; its flowers are white.

== Medicinal uses ==
The dried and ground tuber (from various species of Orchis and Anacamptis) can be made into a fine white powder, called salep. This is a very nutritious sweet starchlike substance. It is used in drinks, cereals and in making bread. In Turkey it is used in ice-creams. It was also used medicinally in diets for children and convalescents.

== Culture ==
The pyramidal orchid was voted the County flower of the Isle of Wight in 2002 following a poll by the wild flora conservation charity Plantlife.
