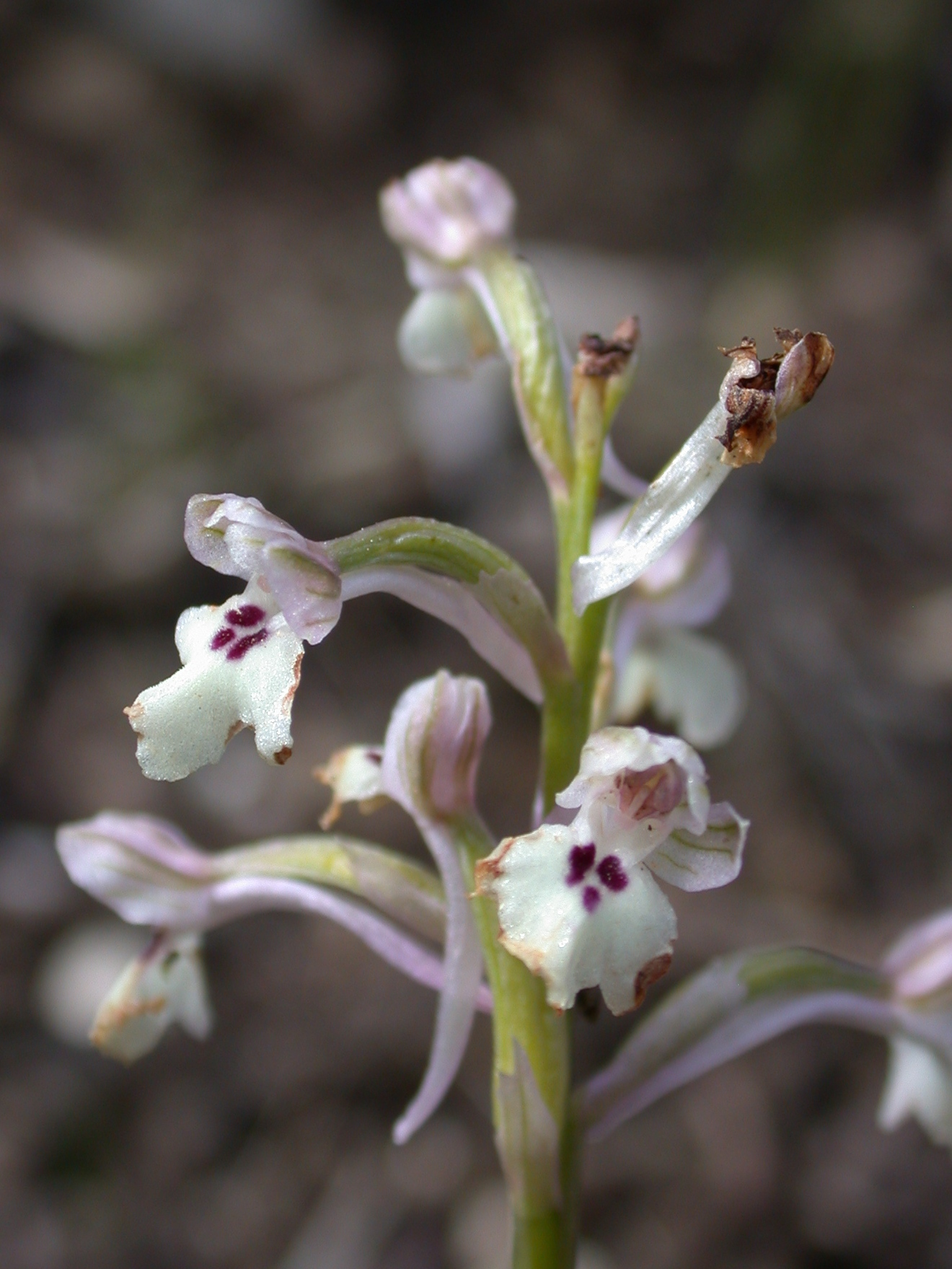

Scientific classification
- Kingdom: Plantae
- Clade: Tracheophytes
- Clade: Angiosperms
- Clade: Monocots
- Order: Asparagales
- Family: Orchidaceae
- Subfamily: Orchidoideae
- Genus: Anacamptis
- Species: A. israelitica

Binomial name
- Anacamptis israelitica (H. Baumann & Dafni) R.M. Bateman, Pridgeon & M.W. Chase (1997)

Synonyms
- Orchis israelitica H. Baumann & Dafni (1979) (Basionym)

= Anacamptis israelitica =

Species of flowering plant

Anacamptis israelitica is a species of orchid found in Israel.
