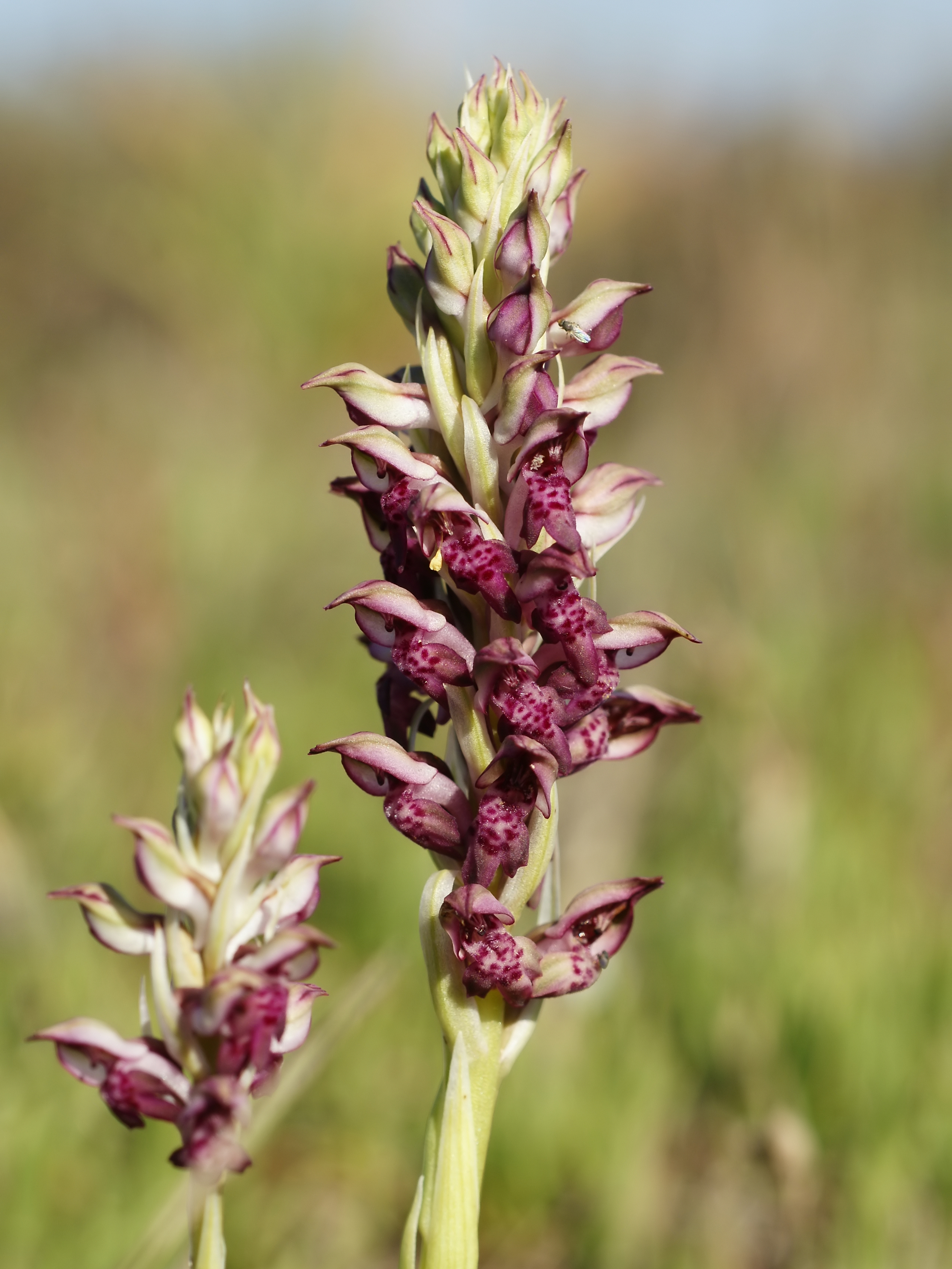
- Anacamptis coriophora

Scientific classification
- Kingdom: Plantae
- Clade: Embryophytes
- Clade: Tracheophytes
- Clade: Angiosperms
- Clade: Monocots
- Order: Asparagales
- Family: Orchidaceae
- Subfamily: Orchidoideae
- Tribe: Orchideae
- Subtribe: Orchidinae
- Genus: Anacamptis; Rich.

Species
- Probably hundreds; see text

Synonyms
- Vermeulenia Á.Löve & D.Löve; Anteriorchis E.Klein & Strack

= Anacamptis =

Genus of flowering plants in the orchid family

Anacamptis is a genus of flowering plants in the orchid family (Orchidaceae); it is often abbreviated as Ant in horticulture. This genus was established by Louis Claude Richard in 1817; the type species is the pyramidal orchid (A. pyramidalis) and it nowadays contains about one-third of the species placed in the "wastebin genus" Orchis before this was split up at the end of the 20th century, among them many that are of hybrid origin. The genus' scientific name is derived from the Greek word anakamptein, meaning "to bend backwards".

These terrestrial orchids occur on grasslands, limestone or chalk deposits, or on dunes in Eurasia, from the Mediterranean region to Central Asia.

== Systematics ==
Except the pyramidal orchid (A. pyramidalis), all species of Anacamptis seem to form a clade around the green-veined orchid (A. morio). They have a diploid chromosome number of 32 or 36. A useful character for distinguishing Anacamptis from Orchis – where the green-veined orchid clade was formerly included – is the basal fusion of the three sepals in Anacamptis.

The few bigeneric hybrids are typically between closely related genera, in particular Serapias. Hybrids between the pyramidal orchid and the early purple orchid (Orchis mascula), found in Cumbria (UK) in 1997, proved short-lived because of the highly divergent genomic lineages of the parents.

=== Species ===
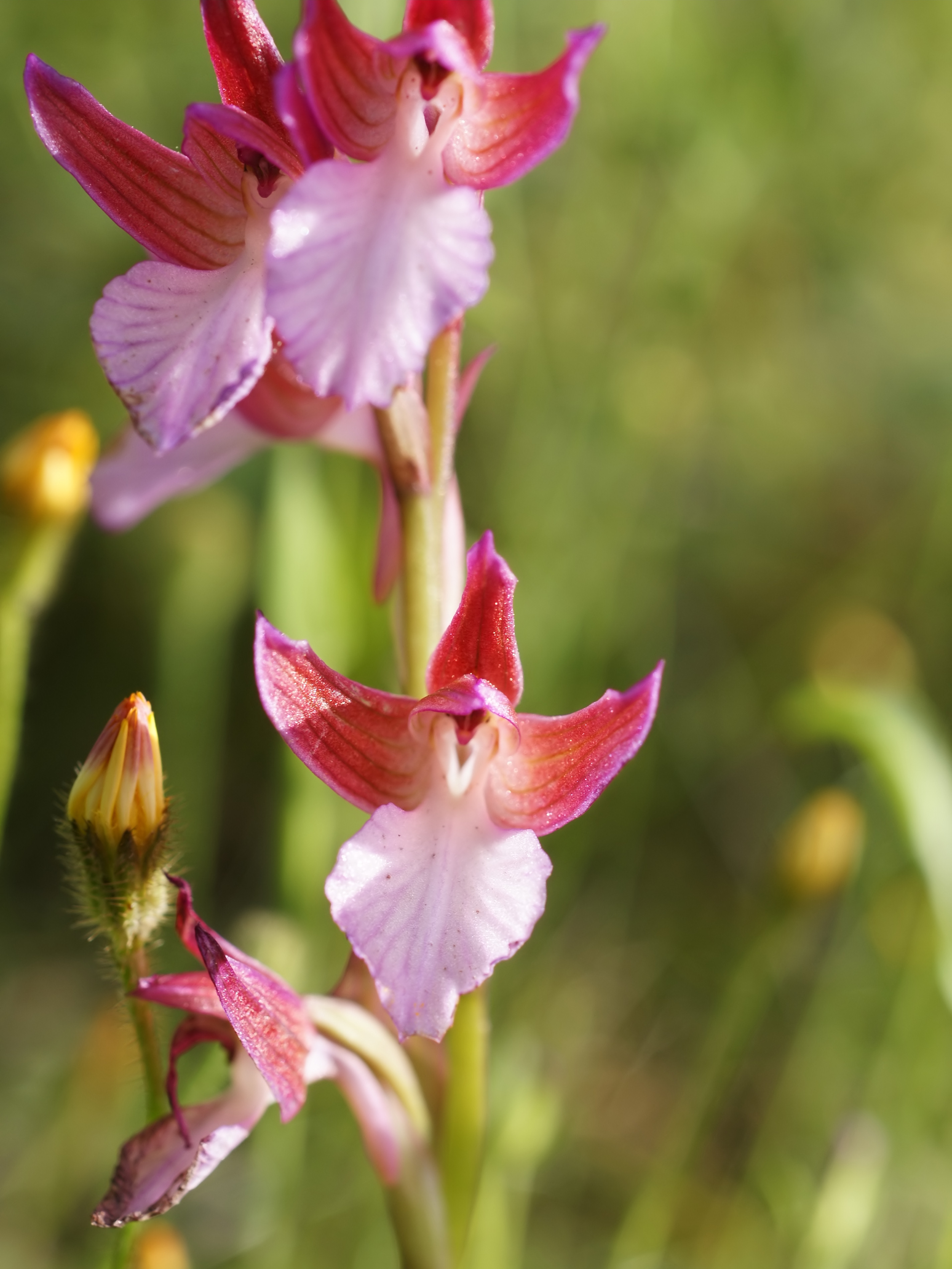
Anacamptis papilionacea

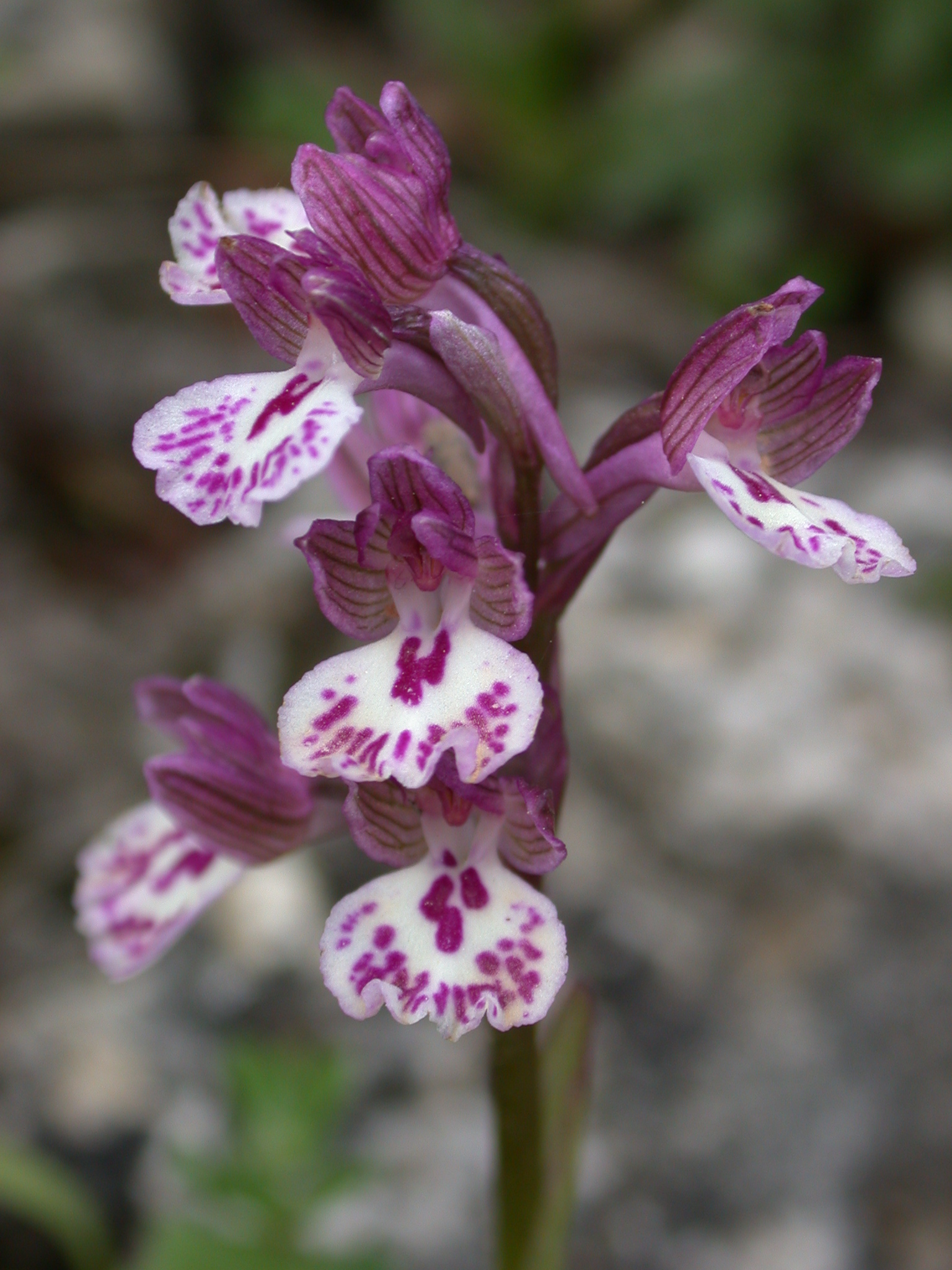
Anacamptis × feinbruniae

As of May 2014, the World Checklist of Selected Plant Families accepts 11 species, two with subspecies:

- Anacamptis boryi (Rchb.f.) R.M.Bateman (S Greece, Crete)
- Anacamptis collina (Banks & Sol. ex Russell) R.M.Bateman (Mediterranean to S Turkmenistan)
- Anacamptis coriophora (L.) R.M.Bateman (Europe, Mediterranean to W Asia)
- Anacamptis cyrenaica (E.A.Durand & Barratte) H.Kretzschmar
- Anacamptis israelitica (H.Baumann & Dafni) R.M.Bateman (N. Israel, Palestine)
- Anacamptis laxiflora (Lam.) R.M.Bateman – loose-flowered orchid, lax-flowered orchid, Jersey orchid (WC Europe, Mediterranean to C Asia)
- Anacamptis morio (L.) R.M.Bateman – green-winged orchid, green-veined orchid
  - Anacamptis morio subsp. caucasica (K.Koch) H.Kretzschmar
  - Anacamptis morio subsp. champagneuxii (Barnéoud) H.Kretzschmar (W Mediterranean)
  - Anacamptis morio subsp. longicornu (Poir.) H.Kretzschmar (W & C Mediterranean)
  - Anacamptis morio subsp. morio
  - Anacamptis morio subsp. picta (Loisel.) Jacquet & Scappat.
  - Anacamptis morio subsp. syriaca (E.G.Camus) H.Kretzschmar
- Anacamptis palustris (Jacq.) R.M.Bateman(Europe, Mediterranean to C Asia)
  - Anacamptis palustris subsp. elegans (Heuff.) R.M.Bateman (Europe to C Asia)
  - Anacamptis palustris subsp. palustris (WC Europe, Mediterranean to Iran)
  - Anacamptis palustris subsp. robusta (T.Stephenson) R.M.Bateman (W Morocco)
- Anacamptis papilionacea (L.) R.M.Bateman – butterfly orchid (Mediterranean to Iran)
- Anacamptis pyramidalis (L.) Rich. – pyramidal orchid
- Anacamptis sancta (L.) R.M.Bateman (E Mediterranean to Caucasus)

=== Selected nothospecies ===
- Anacamptis × timbali nothosubsp. albuferensis (A. coriophora × A. palustris subsp. robusta) (Mallorca)
- Anacamptis × gennarii nothosubsp. bornemanniae (A. morio subsp. longicornu × A. papilionacea) (N Africa, Sardinia)
- Anacamptis × duquesnei (A. palustris × A. pyramidalis) (France)
- Anacamptis × feinbruniae (A. israelitica × A. papilionacea)
- Anacamptis × gennarii (A. morio × A. papilionacea) (W Mediterranean)
- Anacamptis × laniccae (A. morio × A. pyramidalis) (Switzerland, France, Italy)
- Anacamptis × lesbiensis (A. pyramidalis × A. sancta) (E Aegean Islands)
- Anacamptis × simorrensis (A. coriophora × A. pyramidalis) (France, Italy, Greece)
- Anacamptis × van-lookenii (A. papilionacea × A. pyramidalis) (France)

=== Intergeneric hybrids ===
- × Anacamptiplatanthera (Anacamptis × Platanthera) – accepted name
- × Anacamptorchis (Anacamptis × Orchis) – unplaced name
- × Dactylocamptis (Anacamptis × Dactylorhiza) – accepted name
- × Gymnanacamptis (Anacamptis × Gymnadenia) – accepted name
- × Ophramptis (Anacamptis × Ophrys) – unplaced name
- × Serapicamptis (Anacamptis × Serapias) – accepted name

== Notes ==
- Bateman, Richard M. & Hollingsworth, Peter M. (2004): Morphological and molecular investigation of the parentage and maternity of A. × albuferensis (A. robusta × A. fragrans), a new hybrid from Mallorca, Spain. Taxon 53(1): 43–54. HTML abstract
- Bateman, Richard M.; Hollingsworth, Peter M.; Preston, Jillian; Yi-bo, Luo; Prodgeon, Alec M. & Chase, Mark W. (2003): Molecular phylogenetics and evolution of Orchidinae and selected Habenariinae (Orchidaceae). Bot. J. Linn. Soc. 142(1): 1–40. doi:10.1046/j.1095-8339.2003.00157.x PDF fulltext
