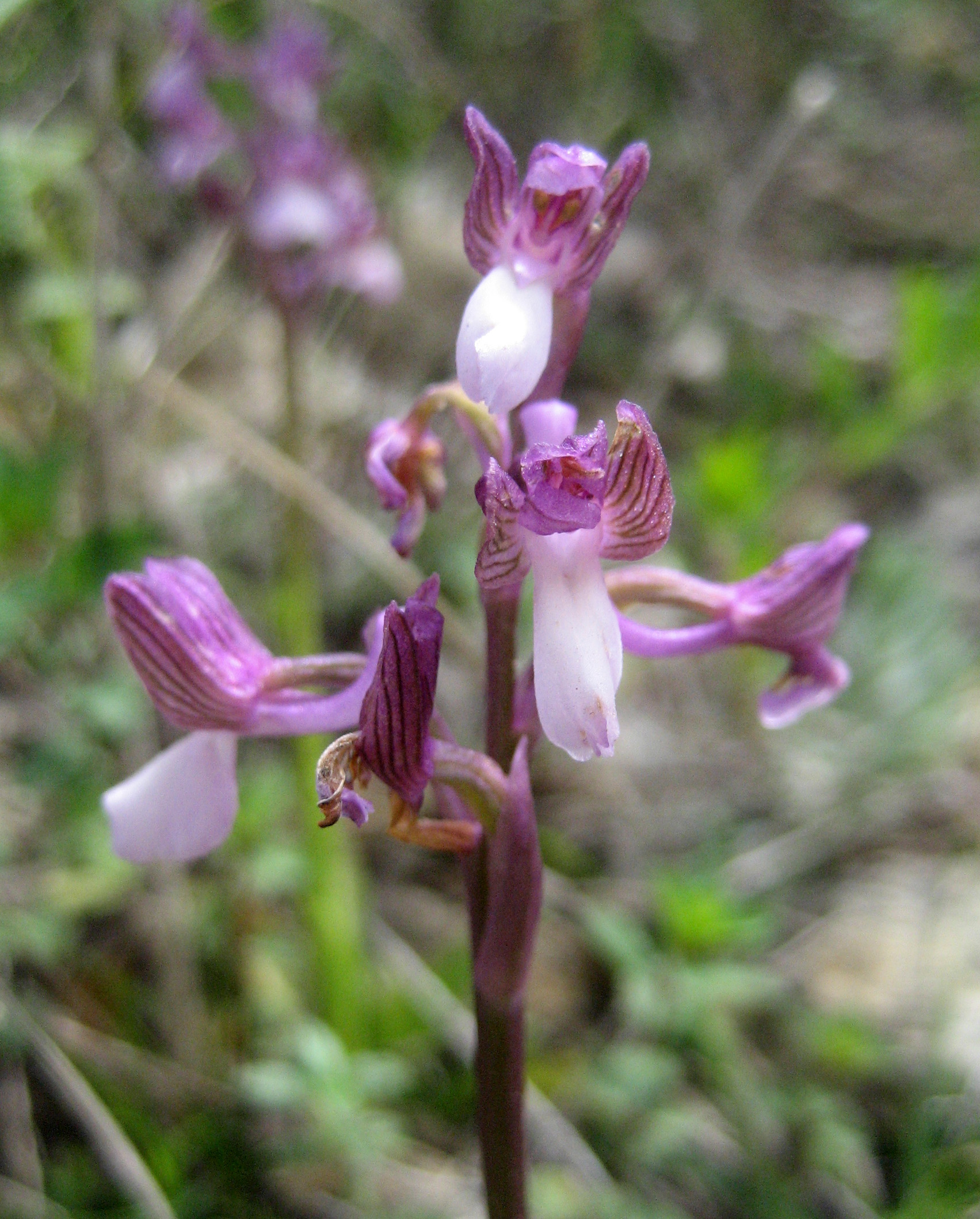

Scientific classification
- Kingdom: Plantae
- Clade: Tracheophytes
- Clade: Angiosperms
- Clade: Monocots
- Order: Asparagales
- Family: Orchidaceae
- Subfamily: Orchidoideae
- Genus: Anacamptis
- Species: A. morio
- Subspecies: A. m. subsp. syriaca

Trinomial name
- Anacamptis morio subsp. syriaca (E.G.Camus) H.Kretzschmar, Eccarius & H.Dietr.

Synonyms
- Orchis morio subsp. syriaca E.G.Camus; Orchis morio var. syriaca (E.G.Camus) Soó i; Orchis syriaca (E.G.Camus) Boiss. ex H.Baumann & Künkele; Anacamptis morio subsp. syriaca (E.G.Camus) H.Kretzschmar, Eccarius & H.Dietr.

= Anacamptis morio subsp. syriaca =

Subspecies of flowering plant

Anacamptis morio subsp. syriaca is a subspecies of orchid. It has been found in Turkey and Lebanon.
