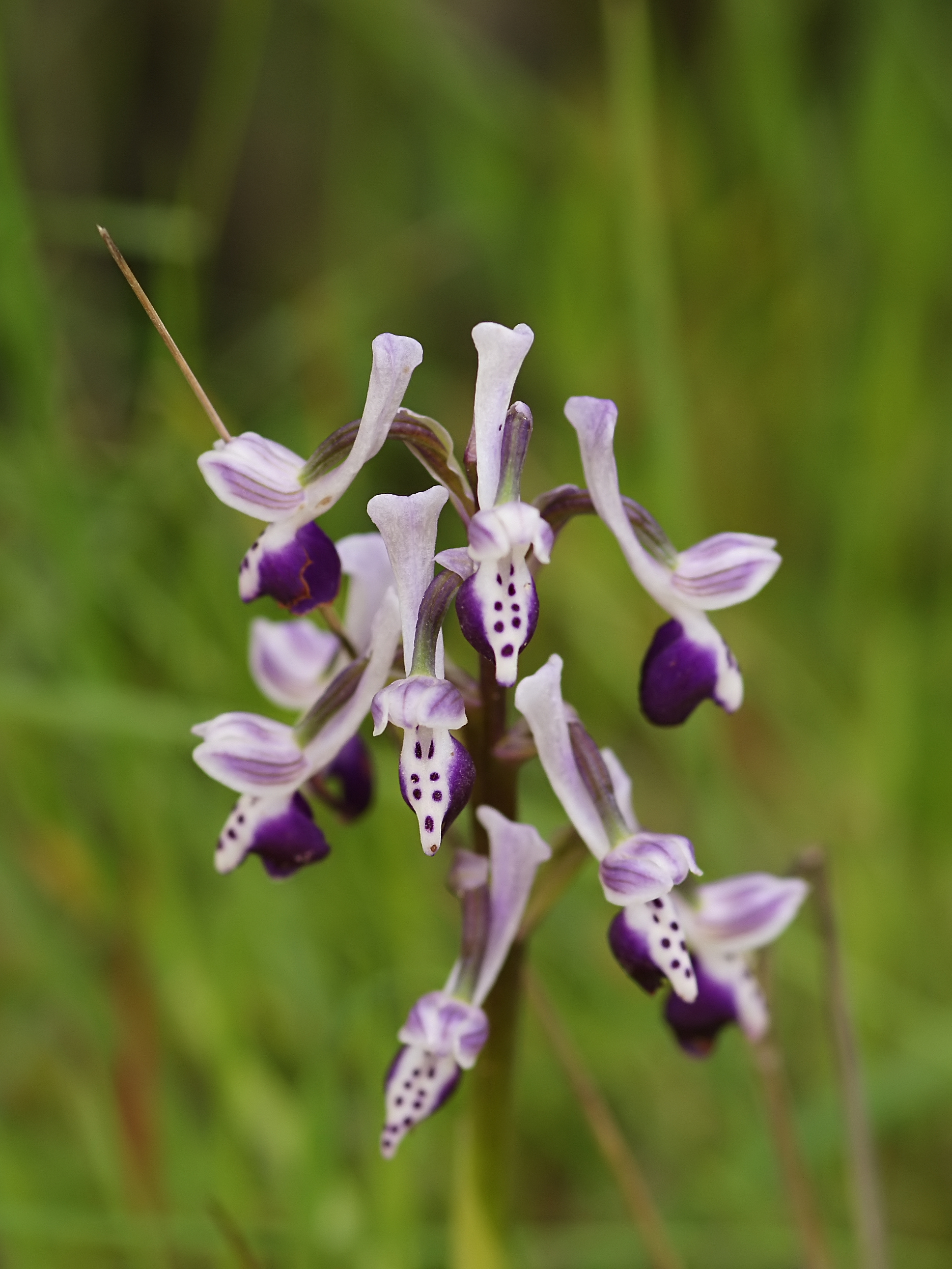

Scientific classification
- Kingdom: Plantae
- Clade: Tracheophytes
- Clade: Angiosperms
- Clade: Monocots
- Order: Asparagales
- Family: Orchidaceae
- Subfamily: Orchidoideae
- Genus: Anacamptis
- Species: A. morio
- Subspecies: A. m. subsp. longicornu

Trinomial name
- Anacamptis morio subsp. longicornu (Poir.) H. Kretzschmar, Eccarius & H. Dietr.

Synonyms
- Anacamptis longicornu (Poir.) R.M. Bateman, Pridgeon & M.W. Chase; Orchis longicornu Poir. (basionym); Orchis longicornu var. tlemecensis Batt.; Orchis morio var. tlemecensis (Batt.) Maire & Weiller

= Anacamptis morio subsp. longicornu =

Subspecies of flowering plant

Anacamptis morio subsp. longicornu, formerly classified as Anacamptis longicornu, is a subspecies of orchid. It is found in southern Europe and western North Africa.

== Description ==
This orchid's flowers are white, lavender, and purple; with a middle lob that is white with purple spots. In contrast to the nominate subspecies, Anacamptis morio subsp. morio, Anacamptis morio subsp. longicornu has a very long spur which is directed upwards.

Its bloom period is from February to May.

== Distribution ==
Anacamptis morio subsp. longicornu is found in dry grassland, meadows, and pastures, on calcareous soils.

It is native to the western Mediterranean region, including:

- Balearic Islands
  - Mallorca
- France — Garrigue and Maquis shrublands.
  - Corsica
- Italy — Matorral shrublands.
  - Sardinia
  - Sicily
- Algeria
- Tunisia
