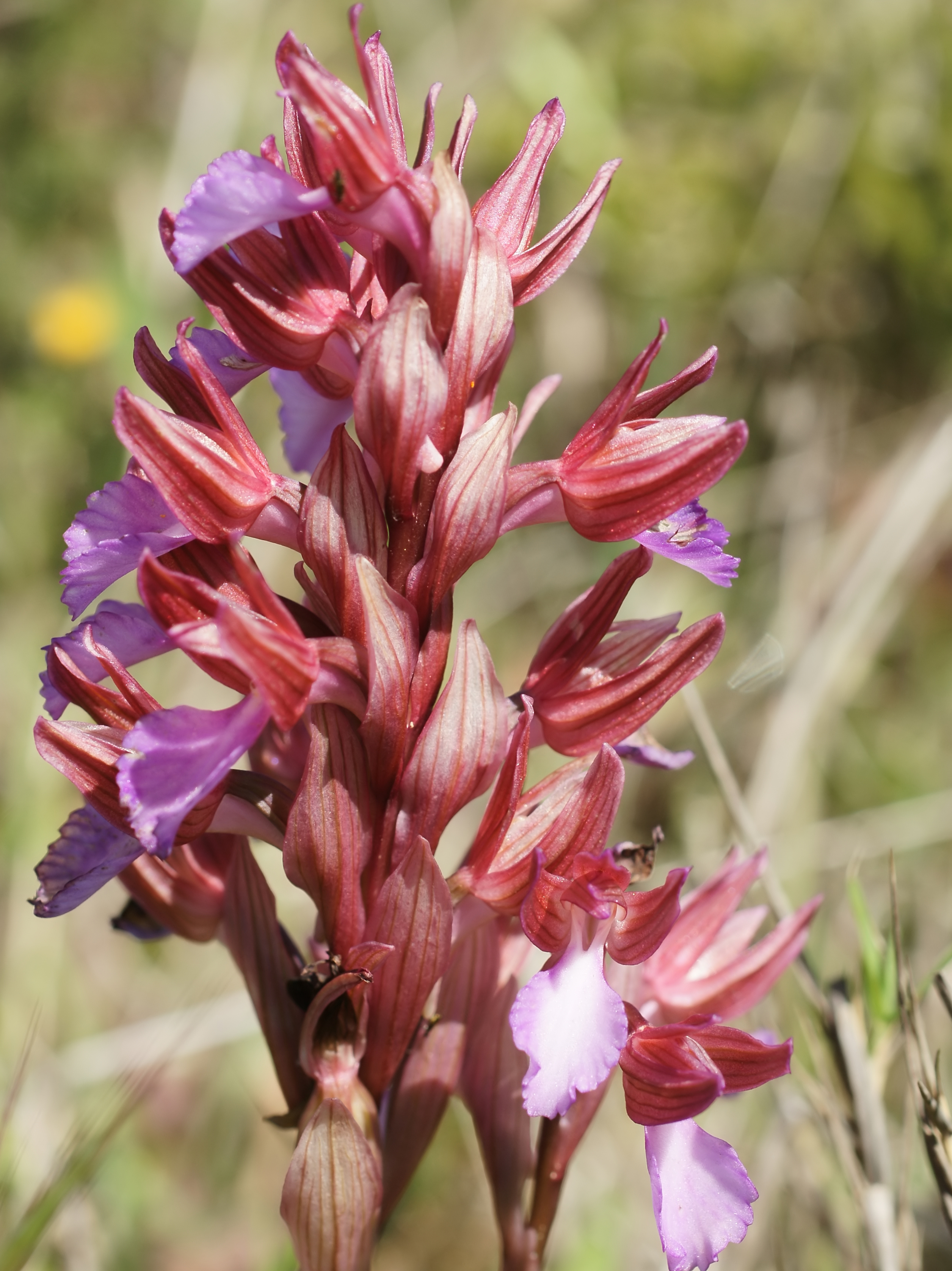

Scientific classification
- Kingdom: Plantae
- Clade: Tracheophytes
- Clade: Angiosperms
- Clade: Monocots
- Order: Asparagales
- Family: Orchidaceae
- Subfamily: Orchidoideae
- Genus: Anacamptis
- Species: A. papilionacea

Binomial name
- Anacamptis papilionacea (L.) R.M. Bateman, Pridgeon & M.W.Chase

Synonyms
- Orchis papilionacea L. (1759) (basionym); Vermeulenia papilionacea (L.) Á. Löve & D. Löve (1972); Vermeulenia papilionacea var. bruhnsiana (Gruner) Szlach. (2001); Vermeulenia papilionacea var. grandiflora (Boiss.) Szlach. (2001); Vermeulenia papilionacea var. heroica (E.D.Clarke) Szlach. (2001)

= Anacamptis papilionacea =

Pink Butterfly Orchid

Species of orchid

Anacamptis papilionacea, (formerly Orchis papilionacea), commonly known as the pink butterfly orchid, is a species of flowering plant in the orchid family Orchidaceae.

== Distribution and habitat ==
The species is found in Southern Europe and Northern Africa (Spain, Turkey, Serbia, Cyprus, Lebanon, Aegean Islands, ...), and favors dry and stony ground.

== Gallery ==
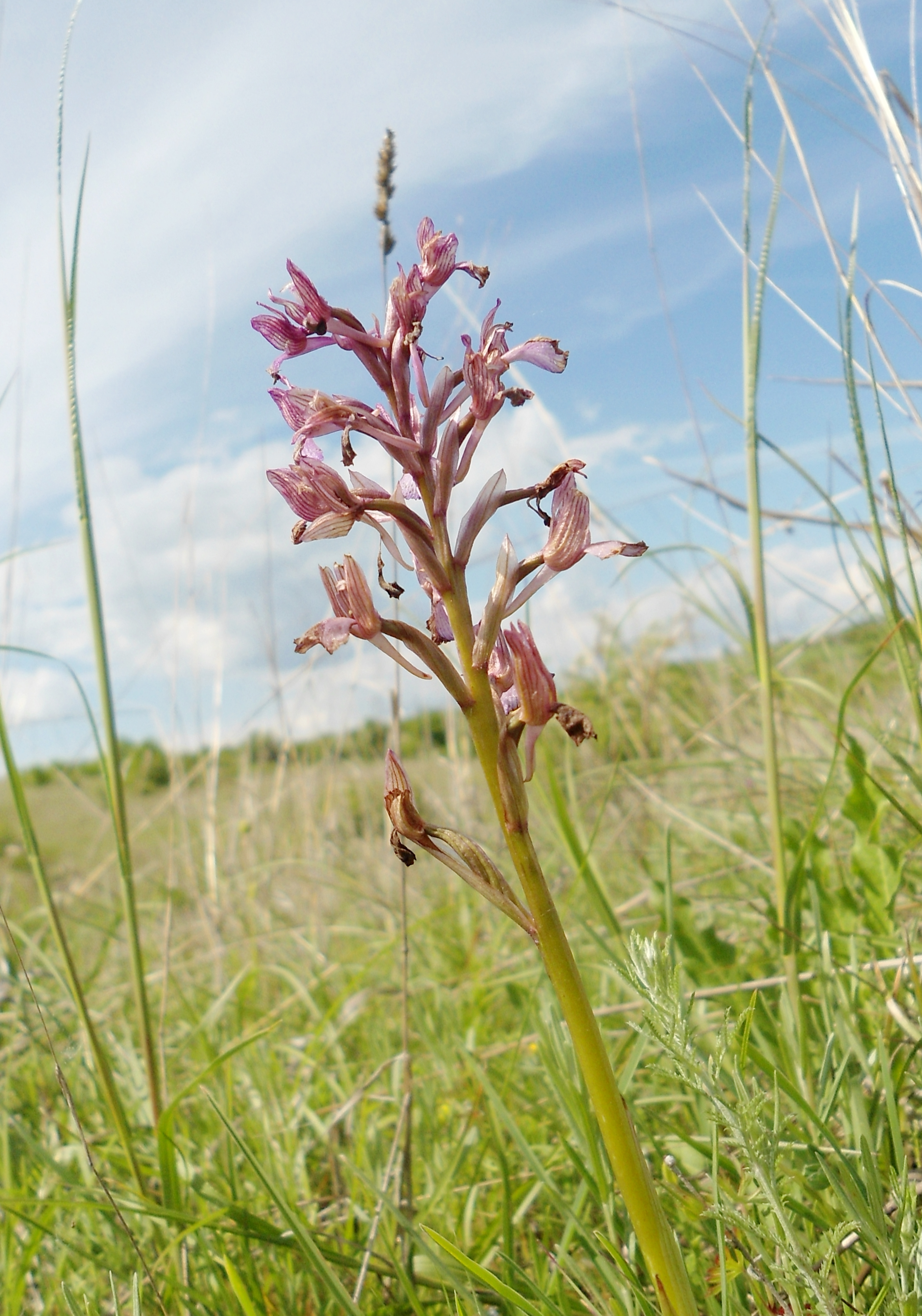
Inflorescence
