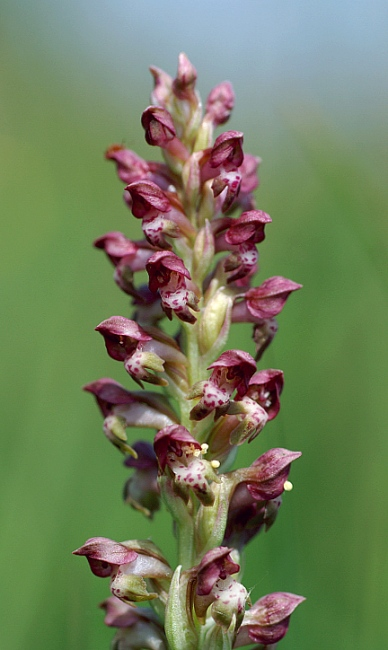

Scientific classification
- Kingdom: Plantae
- Clade: Tracheophytes
- Clade: Angiosperms
- Clade: Monocots
- Order: Asparagales
- Family: Orchidaceae
- Subfamily: Orchidoideae
- Genus: Anacamptis
- Species: A. coriophora

Binomial name
- Anacamptis coriophora (L.) R.M.Bateman, Pridgeon & M.W.Chase (1997)

Synonyms
- List: Orchis coriophora L. (1753) (Basionym); Anacamptis coriophora subsp. carpetana (Willk.) Bernardos (2002); Anacamptis coriophora subsp. fragrans (Pollini) R.M.Bateman, Pridgeon & M.W.Chase (1997); Anacamptis coriophora subsp. martrinii (Timb.-Lagr.) Jacquet & Scappat. (2003); Anacamptis coriophora subsp. nervulosa (Sakalo) Mosyakin & Timch. (2006); Anacamptis coriophora var. carpetana (Willk.) Kreutz (2007); Anacamptis coriophora var. martrinii (Timb.-Lagr.) Kreutz (2007); Anacamptis fragrans (Pollini) R.M.Bateman (2003); Anteriorchis coriophora (L.) E.Klein & Strack (1989); Anteriorchis coriophora subsp. fragrans (Pollini) Jacquet (1997); Anteriorchis coriophora subsp. martrinii (Timb.-Lagr.) Jacquet (1997); Anteriorchis fragrans (Pollini) Szlach. (2001); Herorchis coriophora (L.) D.Tyteca & E.Klein (2008); Herorchis coriophora subsp. fragrans (Pollini) D.Tyteca & E.Klein (2008); Herorchis coriophora subsp. martrinii (Timb.-Lagr.) D.Tyteca & E.Klein (2008); Orchis × carpetana (Willk.) Pau (1921); Orchis cassidea M.Bieb. (1819); Orchis cimicina Crantz (1769); Orchis coreosmus St.-Lag. (1880); Orchis coriophora L. (1753); Orchis coriophora f. borosiana Soó (1927); Orchis coriophora f. latifolia Tinant (1836); Orchis coriophora f. nana W.Zimm. (1910); Orchis coriophora subsp. carpetana (Willk.) K.Richt. (1890); Orchis coriophora subsp. cimicina (Arcang.) E.G.Camus (1908); Orchis coriophora subsp. fragrans (Pollini) K.Richt. (1890); Orchis coriophora subsp. martrinii (Timb.-Lagr.) Nyman (1882); Orchis coriophora subsp. nervulosa (Sakalo) Soó (1969); Orchis coriophora var. carpetana Willk. (1870); Orchis coriophora var. cassidea (M.Bieb.) Nyman (1882); Orchis coriophora var. cibiniensis Schur (1866); Orchis coriophora var. cimicina Arcang. (1894); Orchis coriophora var. czeremossica Zapal. (1906); Orchis coriophora var. elongata Maire (1940); Orchis coriophora var. fragrans (Pollini) Boiss. (1842); Orchis coriophora var. lusciniarum Maire (1939); Orchis coriophora var. major E.G.Camus (1900); Orchis coriophora var. odorata Ten. ex Rchb.f. (1851); Orchis coriophora var. polliniana (Spreng.) Pollini (1824); Orchis coriophora var. sennenii A.Camus (1939); Orchis coriophora var. subsancta Balayer (1986); Orchis coriophora var. symphypetala Brot. (1827); Orchis fragrans Pollini (1811); Orchis fragrans var. elongata (Maire) Raynaud (1985); Orchis fragrans var. polliniana (Spreng.) Pollard (1824); Orchis martrinii Timb.-Lagr. (1856); Orchis nervulosa Sakalo (1941); Orchis polliniana Spreng. (1815); × Orchidactyla carpetana (Pau) Borsos & Soó (1966)

= Anacamptis coriophora =

Species of flowering plant

Anacamptis coriophora, the bug orchid, is a species of orchid, found in Europe, the Mediterranean, and the Near East to Iran.

== Taxonomy ==
Originally this was identified as Orchis coriophora subsp. fragans (Pollini) K.Richt. and even today some authorities like Delforge use the original name to present it as the new species Orchis fragrans Pollini. However the large databases at Kew, World Ckecklist etc. agree that the correct and accepted name for this taxon is Anacamptis coriophora (L.) R.M.Bateman, Pridgeon & M.W.Chase without any distinction being made between subspecies.

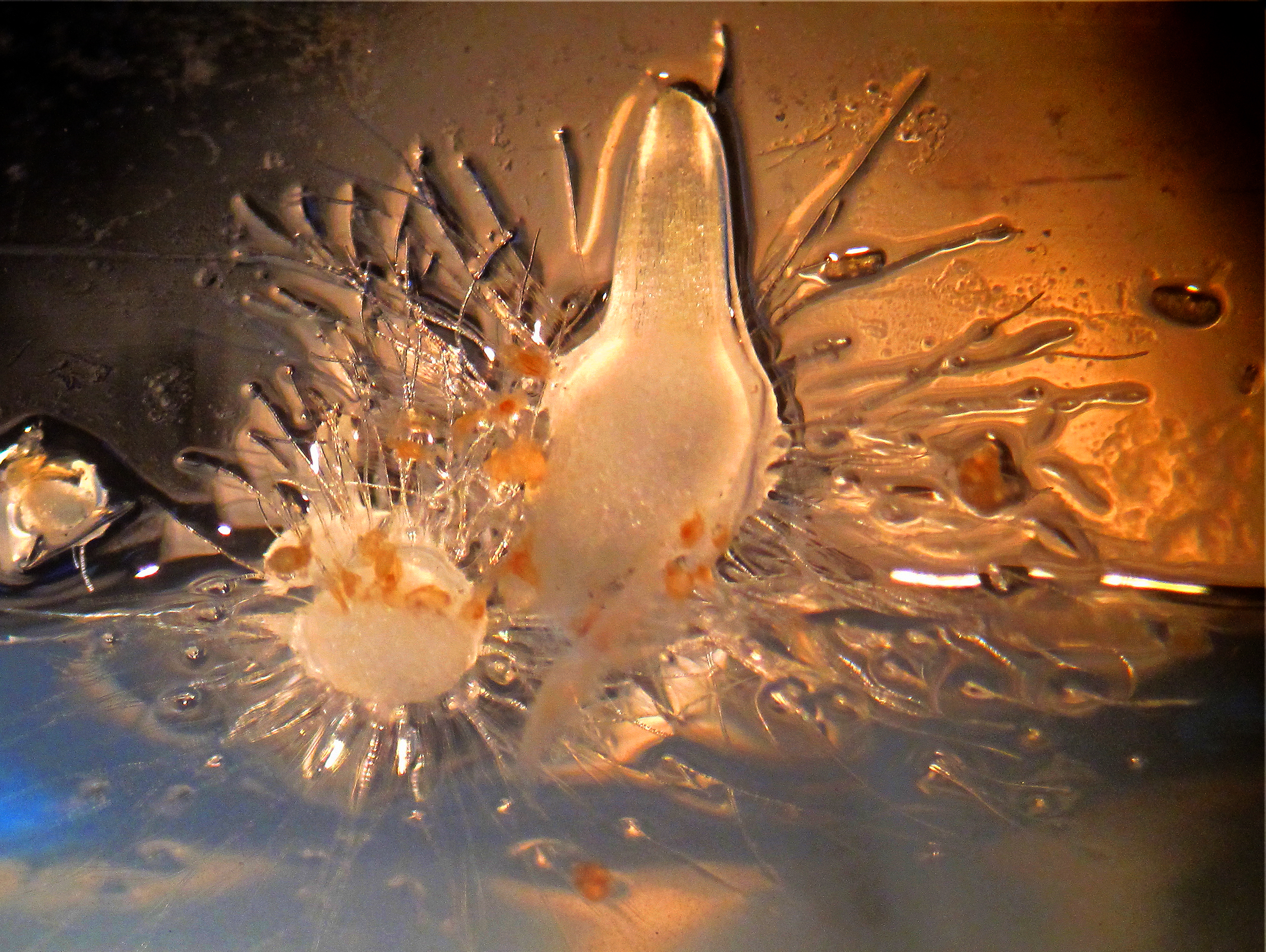
Germinating seeds of the temperate orchid Anacamptis coriophora. The protocorm is the first organ that will develop into true roots and leaves.

== Gallery ==
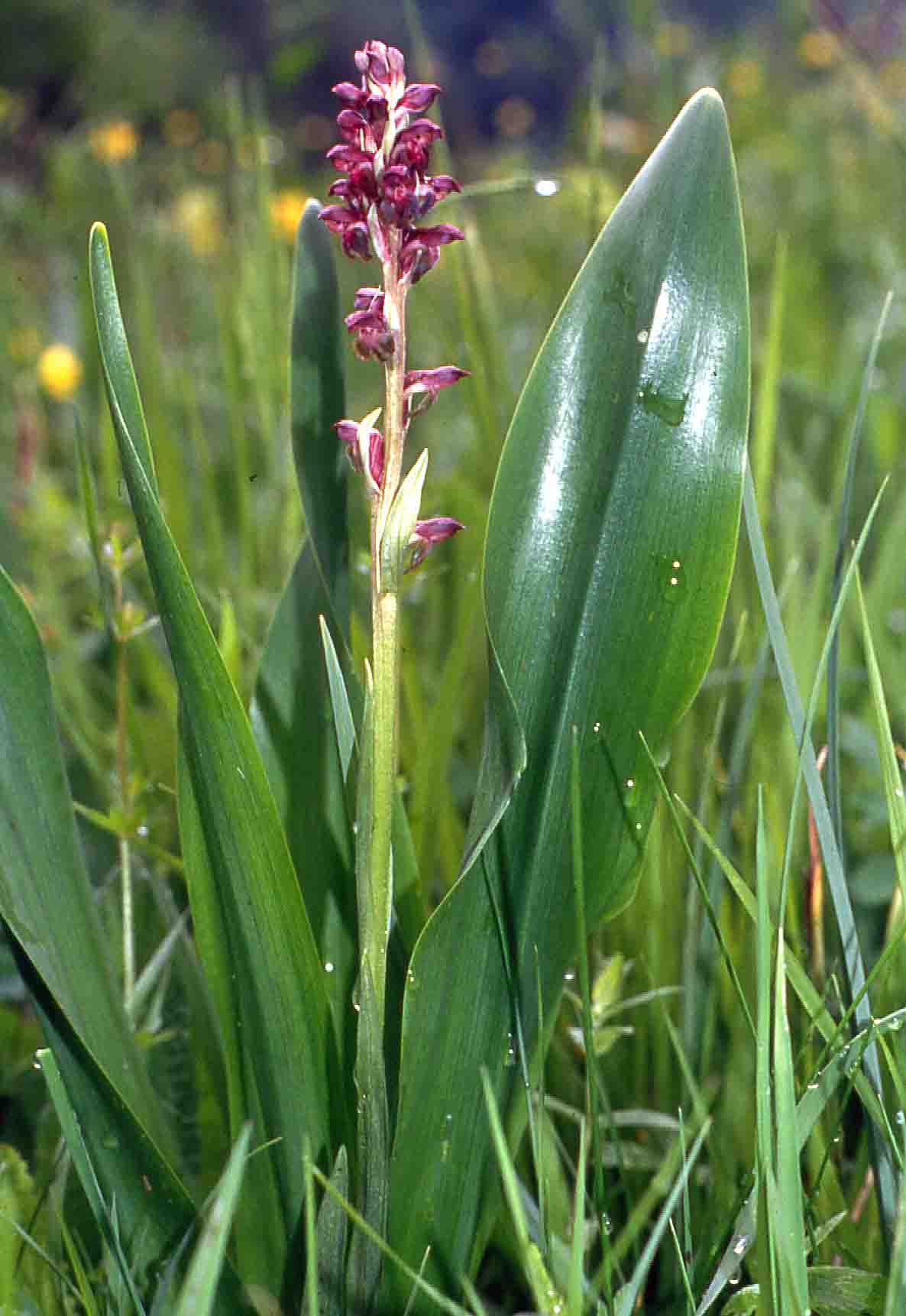
Individual from near Osilnica on the Kupa.
