= Richard Bateman (botanist) =

British botanist

Richard Bateman FLS FGS
- Education: University of London (BSc, PhD)
- Spouse: Paula J. Rudall
- Awards: Bicentenary Medal of the Linnean Society
- Scientific career
- Workplaces: Smithsonian Institution; University of Oxford; Natural History Museum; Royal Botanic Garden Edinburgh; Royal Botanic Gardens Kew
- Thesis: Palaeobotany and palaeoenvironments of Lower Carboniferous floras from two volcanigenic terrains in the Scottish Midland Valley (1988)
- Doctoral advisor: Andrew C. Scott

Richard Mark Bateman (born 1958) is a British botanist and paleobotanist whose numerous research outputs, both academic and popular, encompass several disciplines including botany, palaeobotany, sedimentology and evolutionary theory.'Retired' from paid work in 2010, he remains an Honorary Research Associate of the Royal Botanic Gardens Kew and Emeritus Professor at the University of Reading. He is best-known in neobotany for combining detailed morphometrics, population genetics and phylogenetics to circumscribe orchid species and determine their relationships, in palaeobotany for conceptually reconstructing disarticulated fossil plants, and in evolutionary theory for his advocacy of several non-gradualistic speciation mechanisms, emphasising evolutionary-developmental genetics and relegating natural selection to a secondary, fine-tuning role.

== Education and early life ==
Richard Mark Bateman was born on 27 May 1958 in Bradford, Yorkshire, the son of salesman William Horace Roy Bateman (1927–2023) and laboratory technician Joan Mary Lund (née Laban) (1932–2015). He moved with his parents to Watford in 1961, then accompanied his mother to St Albans in 1966 when his parents separated. He acquired eight O-levels and four A-levels at Francis Bacon Comprehensive School, where he excelled in biology and geography while simultaneously developing a hobbyist's obsession with growing tropical plants, notably orchids.

Over a six-year period while working full-time as a laboratory attendant analysing soils and sediments he completed two part-time bachelor's degrees: the first in life sciences at the University of Bedfordshire (then Luton College of Higher Education: 1982) and the second in earth sciences at Birkbeck College of London University (1984). He immediately began doctoral research at London University on two Lower Carboniferous fossil floras occupying volcanic terrains in Scotland, leading to the award of a PhD in 1988.

== Awards and honours ==
During Bateman's early career, he became the only person thus far to be given both the Geological Society's President's Award (1988) and the Linnean Society's Bicentenary Medal (1994). He was awarded a DSc from University of London in 2001 for his work on plant phylogenetics and evolution, palaeobotany and palaeoenvironments.

Bateman is perhaps best known for the exceptional breadth of his published work. Possession of BSc's in both life and earth sciences, and youthful experience of publishing both amateur botany and professional sedimentology, provided the perfect basis for pursuing his PhD in palaeobotany, which involved the conceptual reconstruction of three anatomically-preserved Carboniferous plants and of two fossil landscapes. Richard Bateman was awarded the English-Speaking Union of the Commonwealth's prestigious Lindemann Fellowship, whch led to three years of postdoctoral research in the Department of Paleobiology at the Smithsonian Institution, Washington DC (1988–1991). This research continued his work on Carboniferous clubmoss trees and also allowed him to develop skills in determining the relationships among species through morphological cladistics. He was one of the first researchers to apply this approach to fossil plants.

From 1991 to 1994 he was a Senior Postdoctoral Research Fellow at the University of Oxford, where he exploited intellectual insights largely acquired during his time at the Smithsonian. Three major research papers published in 1994, led directly to the offer of a permanent, senior joint appointment in Edinburgh between the Royal Botanic Garden Edinburgh (RBGE) and the then Royal Scottish Museum (RSM).Work at RSM continued to exploit his palaeobotanical credentials, whereas his role at RBGE finally allowed him to professionalise his previously amateur neobotanical interests, notably to study in greater depth orchid species and speciation. Molecular phylogenetic and population genetic data were added to his analytical repertoire. In 1996 he consolidated his position full-time at RBGE in order to take up the post of Director of Science.

He served as Keeper of Botany (Head of the Botany Department) at the Natural History Museum from 1999 to 2004, and was an Individual Merit Researcher there from 2004 to 2006. He was Head of Policy for the Biosciences Federation from 2006 to 2007. He is currently an Honorary Research Fellow at the Royal Botanic Gardens Kew.

He has over 300 publications which extend from evolutionary-developmental genetics and evolutionary theory through speciation and phylogenetics of orchids to anatomical palaeobotany.
