= William Durrant Cooper =

English lawyer and antiquary

William Durrant Cooper (1812–1875) was an English lawyer and antiquary.

== Life ==
His father Thomas Cooper was a solicitor practising at Lewes; his mother was Lucy Elizabeth Durrant. He was born in Lewes on 10 January 1812, and was educated at the grammar school of Lewes. When 15 years old he became an articled clerk to his father. In Michaelmas term of 1832 he was admitted attorney and solicitor. In the following year he gave evidence on the parish registers of Sussex before a committee of the House of Commons.

In 1837 he came to live in London, and attached himself to the parliamentary staff of the Morning Chronicle and The Times. The Duke of Norfolk gave him honorific posts as steward for the leet court of Lewes borough and auditor of Skelton Castle in North Yorkshire.

He was a member of the Reform Club, and from 1837 acted as its solicitor; he also was solicitor to the vestry of St. Pancras (20 December 1858). In 1872 he was stricken with an attack of paralysis, but he lingered three years longer, dying at 81 Guilford Street, Russell Square, on 28 December 1875. He never married. Two of his brothers predeceased him; a third, with an only sister, outlived him.

== Works ==
When Thomas Walker Horsfield undertook the task of compiling a history of Sussex, he found a helper in Cooper. The "Parliamentary History of the County of Sussex and of the several Boroughs and Cinque Ports therein" was Cooper's first publication (1834). It dealt with incidents of political intrigue and corruption. His next work was ‘A Glossary of the Provincialisms in use in Sussex. It was superseded by collections of William Douglas Parish. "Sussex Poets" was published in 1842, and had originally been delivered as a lecture at Hastings.

In the muniment room at Skelton Cooper discovered the "Seven Letters written by Sterne and his Friends", which he edited for private circulation in 1844. Cooper contributed articles to the Sussex Archæological Collections, and for many years edited its annual volume. His contributions to the society's transactions on "Hastings" and "The Oxenbridges of Brede Place, Sussex, and Boston, Massachusetts", and his articles in the eighth volume of its collections, were published separately.

For the Camden Society he edited:

- "Lists of Foreign Protestants in England, 1618–88",
- "Savile Correspondence, Letters to and from Henry Savile",
- "Expenses of the Judges of Assize on Western and Oxford Circuits, 1596–1601", and
- "The Trelawny Papers".

For the Shakespeare Society he edited Nicholas Udall's comedy of Ralph Roister Doister and the tragedy of Gorboduc. To the Reliquary he communicated an article on ‘Anthony Babington and the Conspiracy of 1586,’ printed separately in 1862.

Many of his papers appeared in the transactions of the London and Middlesex Archæological Society, one was in the Surrey Archæological Society proceedings, and a paper on "John Cade's followers in Kent" was contributed to the Kent Society, and published as an appendix to Benjamin Brogden Orridge's "Illustrations of Jack Cade's Rebellion".

Cooper was one of the earliest contributors to Notes and Queries, and a frequent writer in Archæologia. He compiled a history of Winchelsea in 1850, and wrote for vols. viii. and xxiii. of the ‘Sussex Archæological Collection’ two further papers on the same subject. Mark Anthony Lower was indebted to him for information published in the work on "Sussex Worthies".
