= Sussex Archaeological Collections =

- Discipline: Archaeology, history of Sussex
- Language: English
- Edited by: Jaime Kaminski

Publication details
- History: 1848–present
- Publisher: Sussex Archaeological Society (United Kingdom)
- Frequency: Annual
- Open access: Delayed

Standard abbreviations
- ISO 4: Sussex Archaeol. Collect.

Indexing
- ISSN: 0143-8204
- OCLC no.: 866111089

Links
- Journal homepage; Sussex Archaeological Collections at the Archaeology Data Service

Sussex Archaeological Collections is an annual peer-reviewed academic journal covering archaeological topics. The journal is published by the Sussex Archaeological Society and was established in 1848.

== History ==
The Sussex Archaeological Society was founded in the 1840s. In 1847 its members decided to create a publication relating to the history of Sussex. The society was amongst the first organisations founded to study a county's history, and by 2012 it had published the third most articles amongst journals on English counties. Owen Bedwin (editor 1979–1983) introduced anonymous reviewing for articles.

Florence Dodson was the first woman to write an article in the journal, published in 1880; no other women authored articles before 1900, though it became more common in the 1920s. A survey of articles found that between 1900 and 1950, 4% were written by women, a similar proportion to the Antiquaries Journal and Archaeologia (both published by the Society of Antiquaries of London).

The society was the first county-based archaeological society to share content through the Archaeology Data Service, an online open-access platform. Initially, volumes from 1999 onwards were freely available two years after they were published. By 2012, only the Surrey Archaeological Society had done something similar, though this later became more common and the SAS's own work available through the ADS was extended to cover everything since the journal's inception. Marking the society's 175th anniversary in 2021, volunteers at the SAS completed a project digitising and indexing the whole catalogue of the journal. The issues were made freely available online through the ADS.

== Editors ==
In 1909, Louis Francis Salzman became the first professional archaeologist or historian to edit the journal; professionalisation became the norm. The following people are or have been editors-in-chief:

- 1847–1858: William Henry Blaauw
- 1859–1865: William Durrant Cooper
- 1865–1870: Mark Antony Lower
- 1870–1871: Edward Turner
- 1872–1876: William de St Croix
- 1876–1880: Charles Francis Trower
- 1880–1884: "By committee"
- 1885–1895: Henry Griffith
- 1895–1904: Henry Michell Whitley
- 1899–1909: The Revd William Hudson
- 1909–1958: Louis Francis Salzman
- 1959–1973: Francis William Steer
- 1974–1978: Peter Frank Brandon
- 1979–1983: Owen Bedwin
- 1984–1987: Timothy P. Hudson
- 1988–1992: Brian M. Short
- 1993: John Mills
- 1994–1999: Gwen Jones
- 2000–2001: Sue Hamilton
- 2002: Malcolm J. Kitch
- 2003: John Manley
- 2004: Malcolm J. Kitch and Luke Barber
- 2005–2021: Luke Barber
- 2021–present: Jaime Kaminski
