= William Douglas Parish =

English writer on dialect

William Douglas Parish (16 December 1833–23 September 1904) was a British clergyman, antiquarian, and author on dialects.

Parish was born in 1833 at St. Marylebone, one of the thirteen children of Sir Woodbine Parish, a British diplomat. He was the youngest son of his father's first marriage to Amelia Morse. Among his siblings were Major General Henry Woodbine Parish, Admiral John Edward Parish, and Francis Parish, a diplomat in Buenos Aires and Havana. He also had several half-siblings of his father's second marriage, among them Blanche Marion Parish, wife of the first Baron Shuttleworth.

Parish was educated at Charterhouse School and Oxford University, after which he was ordained as curate of Firle and Beddingham in 1859. He was appointed vicar of Selmeston and Alciston in 1863, a position which he would hold for the rest of his life. During his long tenure there, he oversaw the demolition of the old church and the construction of the present one. He also served as chancellor of Chichester Cathedral from 1877 to 1900.

Parish had a number of interests, including archeology, language, and education. He was expert in monastic Latin and Old English script, and had a keen interest in the folklore of Sussex. His works included A Telegraphist's Easy Guide (1874), which explained Morse Code; A Dictionary of the Sussex Dialect and Collection of Provincialisms in use in the County of Sussex (1875), his best-known work; School Attendance secured without Compulsion (1875), which advanced the idea of using monetary rewards to incentivize school attendance; Domesday Book in Relation to the County of Sussex (1886), produced for the Sussex Archaeological Society; and A Dictionary of the Kentish Dialect (1887).

Among Parish's friends was Charles Dodgson, better known as Lewis Carroll, who is said to have written parts of the Alice in Wonderland stories during his visits. A papier-mâché model in the vicarage was said to be the inspiration for the Jabberwocky, while the "borogove" (a fictional bird referenced in the Jabberwocky poem) was based on a stuffed bird that Parish had received from South America.

Parish died unmarried in 1904 aged 70 at the vicarage in Selmeston, having held the benefice there for forty one years.
