= Richard Lower =

Richard Lower may refer to:

- Richard Lower (physician) (1631–1691), British physician
- Richard Lower (poet) (1782–1865), English dialect poet
- Richard Lower (surgeon) (1929–2008), American cardiac surgeon
