= Fishbourne Roman Palace =

Archaeological site in Fishbourne, Sussex, United Kingdom

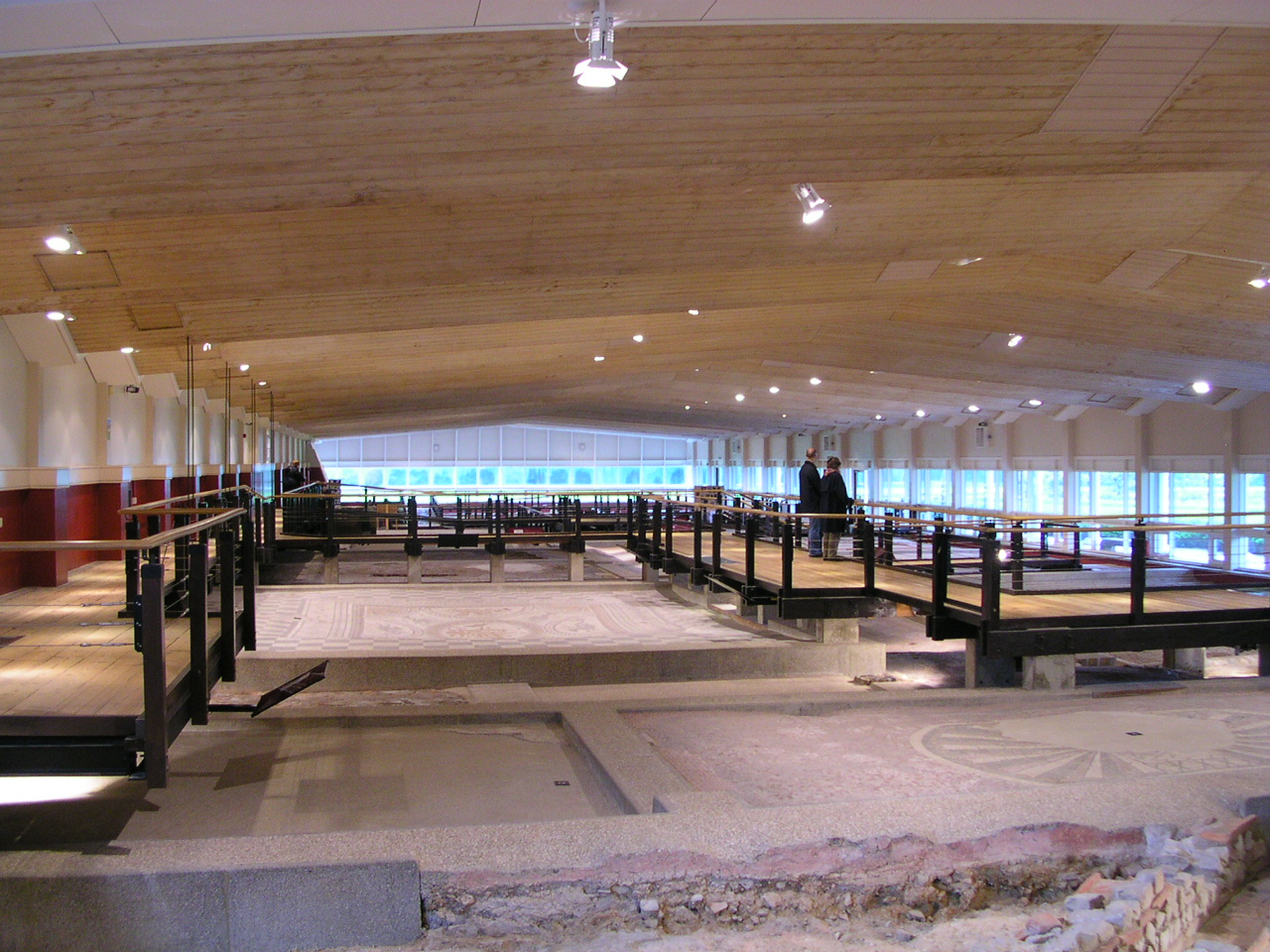
- Mosaics at Fishbourne Roman Palace

- Location within West Sussex

General information
- Location: Fishbourne, West Sussex grid reference SU838047, United Kingdom
- Coordinates: 50.8366°N 0.8103°W
- Completed: 1st century
- Destroyed: c. 270 AD

Fishbourne Roman Palace or Fishbourne Villa is in the village of Fishbourne, near Chichester in West Sussex. The palace is the largest known Roman residence north of the Alps, and has an unusually early date of 75 AD, around thirty years after the Roman conquest of Britain.

Much of the palace has been excavated and is preserved, along with an on-site museum. The rectangular palace surrounded formal gardens, the northern parts of which have been reconstructed.

Extensive alterations were made in the second and third centuries AD, when many of the original black and white mosaics were overlaid with more sophisticated coloured work, including the perfectly preserved Dolphin mosaic in the north wing. More alterations were in progress when the palace burnt down in around 270 AD, after which it was abandoned.

== Discovery and excavation ==
The site was accidentally discovered in 1805, during the construction of a new home on the grounds of the ancient Roman ruin. Workers discovered 13-foot-wide (4 m) pavement as well as fragments of columns. In the following years, additional remains of pottery fragments and portions of mosaic tiles were unearthed by local inhabitants who lived near the site. However, the locals were unable to conceive the fact that the findings were part of a larger unknown structure that remained below the surface. It wasn't until 1960, that Aubrey Barrett, an engineer working for the Portsmouth Water Company, discovered the foundations of a “masonry building” located north of the main road while digging a trench for a water main.

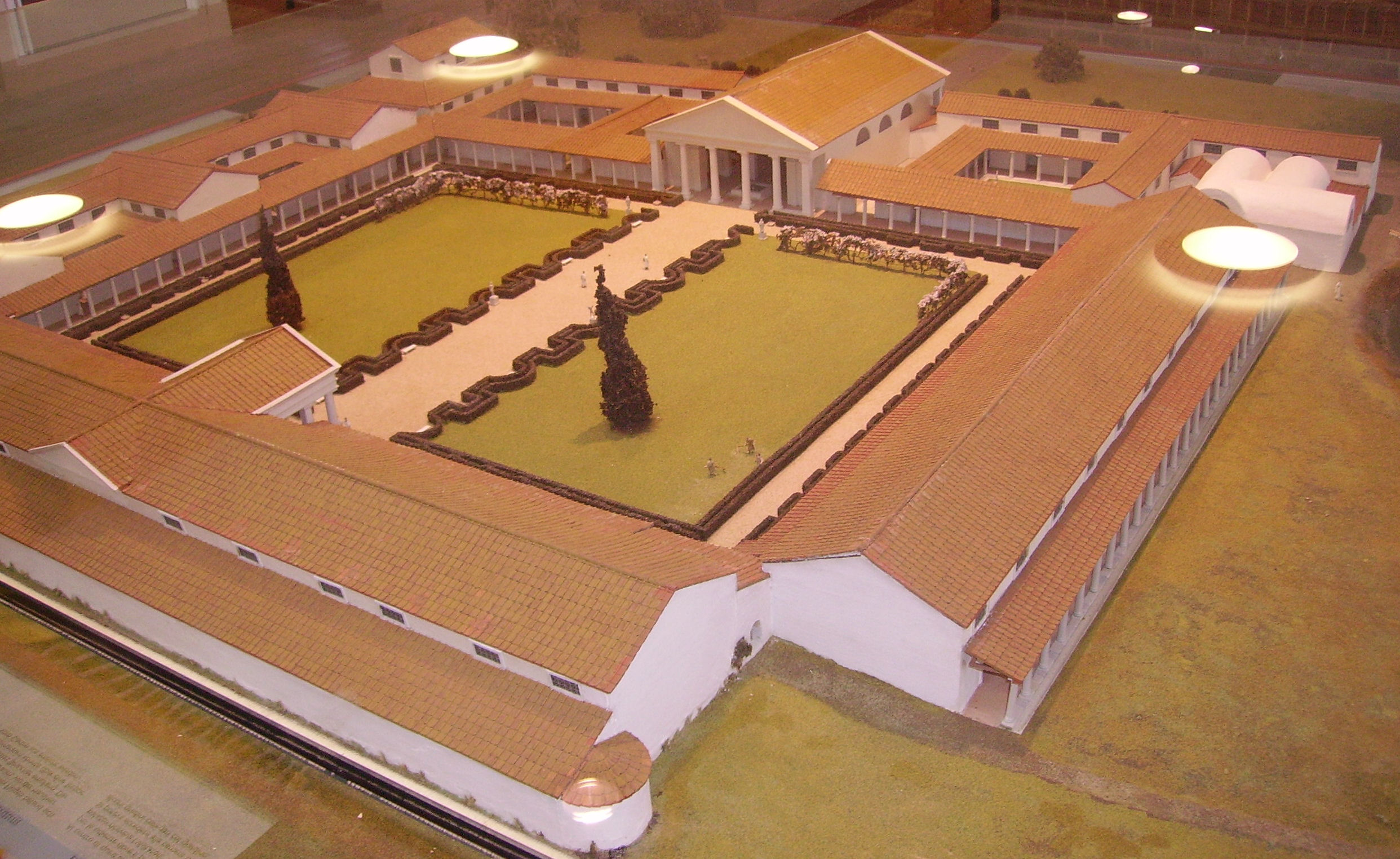
Museum model (made in 1968) of how Fishbourne Roman Palace may have appeared

This rediscovery of the ancient structure caught the attention of the Sussex Archaeological Society and triggered the first series of excavations, directed by the archeologist Barry Cunliffe and his team in 1961. Cunliffe's findings provide the most significant portion of the information associated with the site. In the years following the initial excavations led by Cunliffe, a series of further excavations were conducted, each of which focused on unearthing various other areas of the ancient site.

To the surprise of archeologists and historians alike, each stage of excavations revealed previously unknown details surrounding the site's vast and complex history. For instance, from 1995 to 1999, the archeologists John Manley and David Rudkin conducted digs that focused on southern portions of the site, which exposed significant evidence of human activity prior to the Roman conquest in 43 AD. Over the course of five years, Manley's team of archeologists discovered nearly twelve thousand artifacts, including flint tools that are believed to date back to the Mesolithic period (around 5000–4000 BC) and could indicate the presence of hunter gatherer settlements near the present-day location of Fishbourne palace. However, the most intriguing and significant evidence of pre-Roman human activity at the site comes from a ditch containing nearly seven hundred fragments of pottery and a cup that can be traced back to a period in the Late Iron Age. The findings made by Manley and his team challenge Cunliffe's earlier assumptions by suggesting the likely presence of significant human activity at Fishbourne prior to 43 AD.

The site of the excavated Roman villa was so large that it became known as Fishbourne Roman Palace. In size, it is approximately equivalent to Nero's Golden House in Rome or to the Villa Romana del Casale near to Piazza Armerina in Sicily, and in plan it closely mirrors the basic organization of the Emperor Domitian's palace, the Domus Flavia, completed in 92 AD upon the Palatine Hill in Rome. Fishbourne is by far the largest Roman residence known north of the Alps. At about 500,000 square feet (46,000 m^{2}), it has a larger footprint than Buckingham Palace.

== Siting ==
The location of Fishbourne, in proximity to Chichester (Noviomagus Reginorum), is often looked to when discussing the opulent wealth represented at Fishbourne as well as solidification for the claim of Tiberius Claudius Cogidubnus as the villa owner. The city of Chichester was in the heart of the dominant Atrebates tribe, but their early introduction to Roman imperialism created a pseudo-friendly relationship between the Romans and the Atrebates. The tribal people in the area were later called the Regni after being ruled by Roman client kings for so long. A research article written by David Tomalin, suggests that the Fishbourne palace may have possibly been designated as a "seat of lordship", which meant that it may have had greater financial and social authority as opposed to other palaces or villas in its vicinity. Furthermore, the palace's proximity to the Fishbourne channel, which provided ships with access to the sea, meant that it could have potentially had its own harbour that received trading ships at one point.

== History and description ==
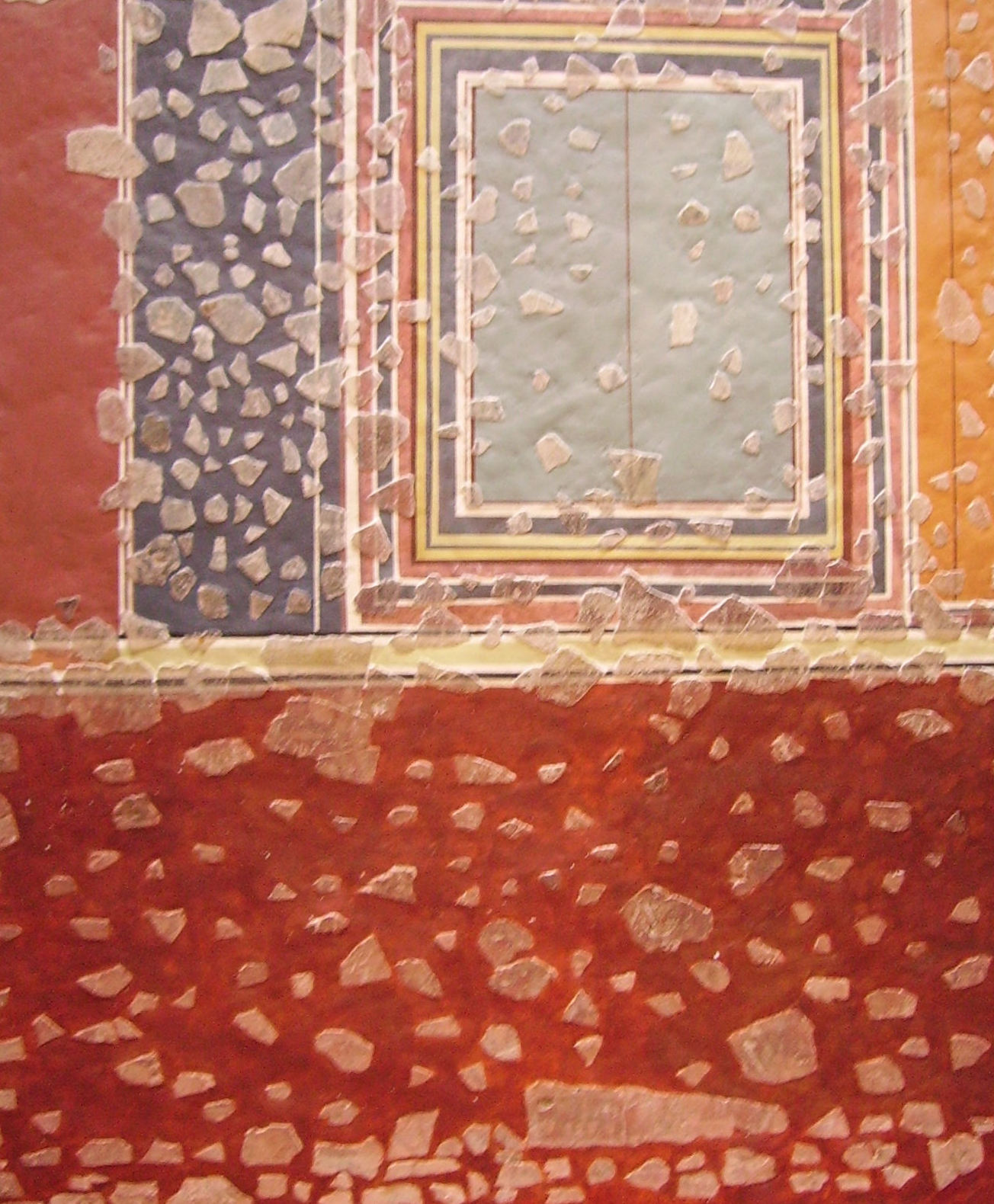
Reconstructed wall painting

The first buildings on the site were granaries, over 33 m (108 ft) long, apparently a supply base for the Roman army constructed in the early part of the conquest in 43 AD. Later, two residential timber-frame buildings were constructed, one with clay and mortar floors and plaster walls which appears to have been a house of some comfort.

These buildings were demolished around 60 AD and replaced nearby with an elaborate and substantial stone-walled villa, or proto-palace, in about 65 AD which included a courtyard garden with colonnades and a bath suite, together with two other buildings, and using material taken from the earlier buildings. It was decorated with wall paintings, stucco mouldings and opus sectile marble polychrome panels. The life-size head of a young man carved in marble, found during excavations in May 1964, and identified as a likeness of Nero aged 13 created at, or shortly after, his formal adoption by the Emperor Claudius in 50 AD probably originated from the proto-palace. Foreign, probably Italian, craftsmen had to be employed at this early period. This building was not unique in this area as the villa at Angmering was similar in many respects and suggests a number of aristocrats living in the area who must have used the same workforce.

The full-size palace with four residential wings surrounding a formal courtyard garden of 250 by 320 feet (75 by 100 metres) was built in around 75–80 AD and took around five years to complete, incorporating the proto-palace in its south-east corner. Massive levelling of the vast site reached up to 5 feet (1.5 metres) in places. The gardens were surrounded by colonnades in the form of a peristyle.

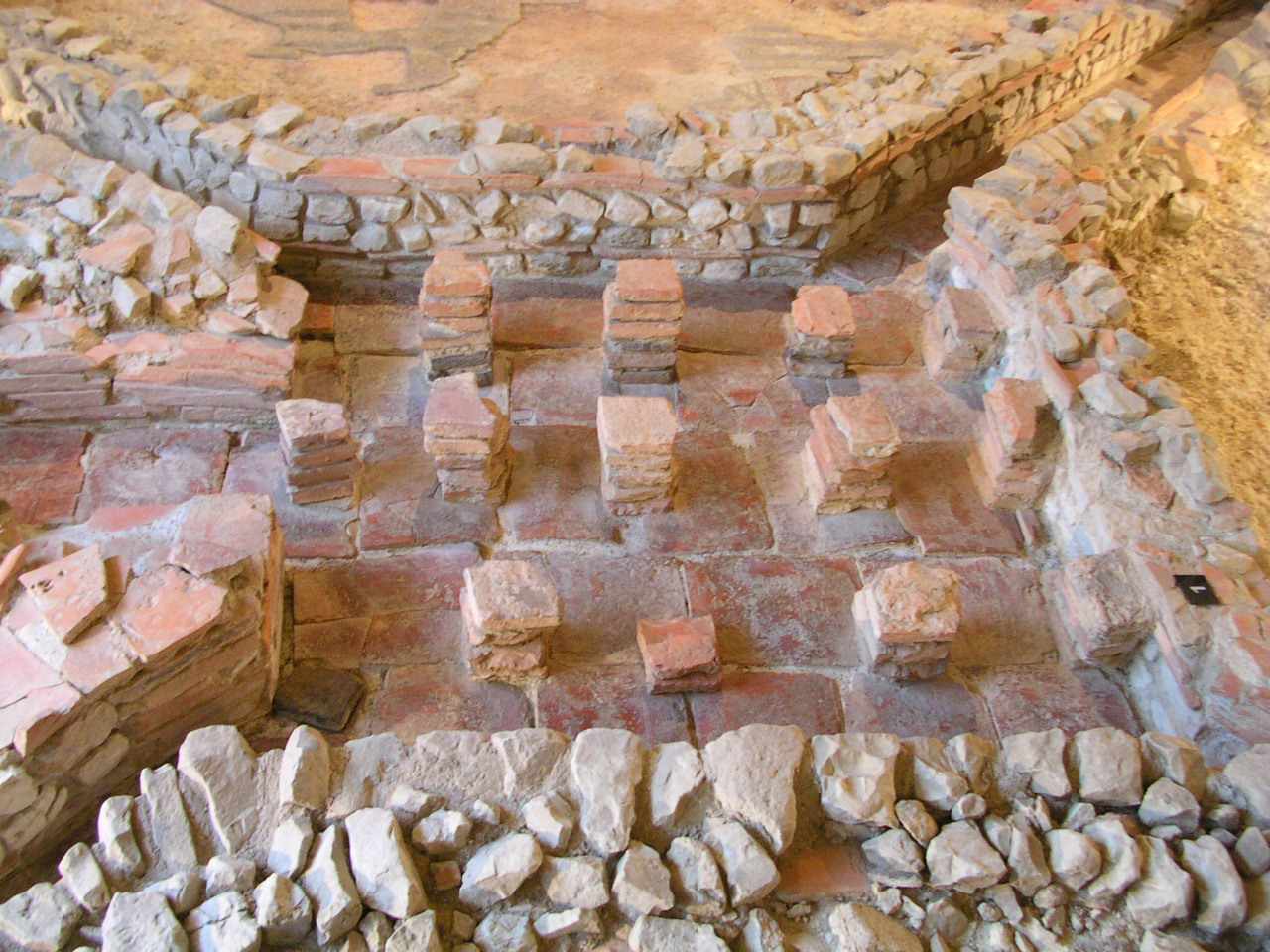
Hypocaust

The north and east wings each consisted of suites of rooms built around courtyards, with a monumental entrance in the middle of the east wing. In the north-east corner was a huge aisled assembly hall. The west wing contained state rooms, a large ceremonial reception room, and a gallery. The south wing probably contained the owner's private apartments although the north wing has the most elaborate visible mosaics. The palace included as many as 50 excellent mosaic floors, under-floor central heating and an integral bathhouse. The garden was shown to contain elaborate plantings of shaped beds for hedges and trees with water supplies for fountains. In addition the south wing overlooked a vast artificial terrace laid out as a rectangular garden extending 300 ft towards the sea where there was a quay wall. This garden was planted as a "natural" landscape with trees and shrubs, and with a pond and stream. It also had colonnades on at least one side.

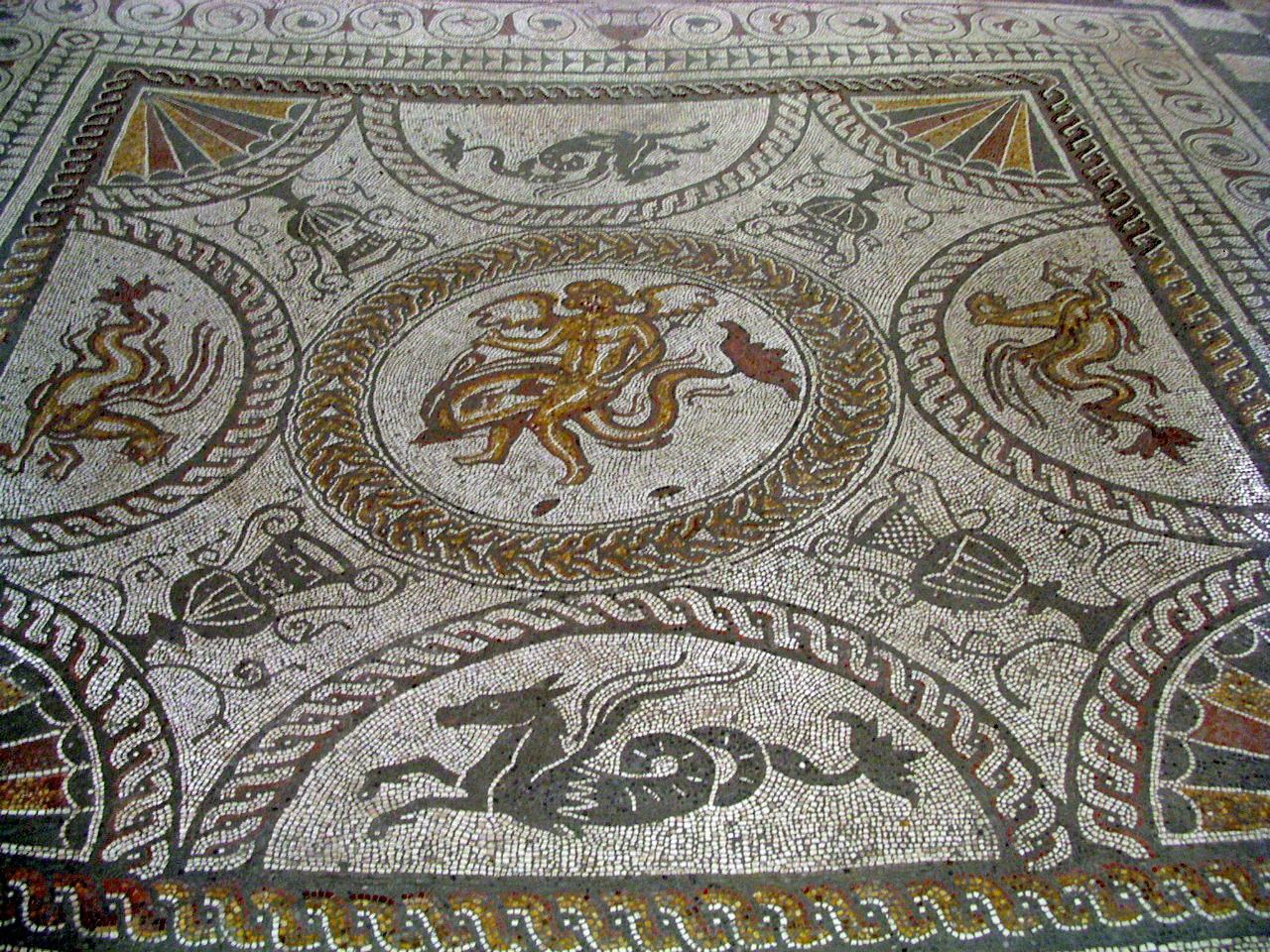
The Cupid on a Dolphin mosaic

The decoration of the palace was elaborate, including wall paintings, stucco mouldings and opus sectile, marble polychrome panels, examples of which are in the museum. As in the proto-palace, foreign craftsmen had to be employed at this early period. The palace outlasted the original owner and was extensively re-modelled early in the 2nd century, and maybe subdivided into two or more separate villas with the addition of a baths suite in the north wing. A remarkable new Medusa mosaic was also laid over an earlier one in the centre of the north wing in about 100 AD.

In the middle of the second century AD, further major redesign included demolition of the recent baths suite and the eastern end of the north wing, probably due to subsidence from underlying earlier infill. New baths were built in the garden and peristyle in front of the east wing and a wall across the garden enclosed the northern half. The north wing was also extensively altered in plan, with four new polychrome mosaics including the Cupid mosaic dating from about 160 AD. Further redevelopment was done at times in the late third century. The final alterations were incomplete when the north wing was destroyed in a fire c. 270 AD.

=== Owner ===
The accepted theory, first proposed by Barry Cunliffe, is that the early phase of the palace was the residence of Tiberius Claudius Cogidubnus (or Togidubnus), a pro-Roman local chieftain who was installed as king of a number of territories following the first stage of the conquest. Cogidubnus is known from a reference to his loyalty in Tacitus's Agricola, and from an inscription commemorating a temple dedicated to Neptune and Minerva found in nearby Chichester. Furthermore, around 60 AD, Cogidubnus was granted the prominent title of legatus Augusti, which normally restricted to the statesmen and aristocrats of Rome. Cunliffe correlates this event with the construction of a large masonry extension of the palace in 70 AD, which was fitting for an individual of such a high status in order to support his theory.

Another theory is that it was built for another native, Sallustius Lucullus, a Roman governor of Britain of the late 1st century who may have been the son of the British prince Adminius. Two inscriptions recording the presence of Lucullus have been found in Chichester and the re-dating, by Miles Russell, of the palace to the early 90s AD, would fit far more securely with such an interpretation. If the palace was designed for Lucullus, then it may have only been in use for a few years, for the Roman historian Suetonius records that Lucullus was executed by the Emperor Domitian in or shortly after 93 AD.

Additional theories suggest that owner of the palace was either Verica, a British client king of the Roman Empire in the years preceding the Claudian invasion, or even one Tiberius Claudius Catuarus, whose gold signet ring was discovered nearby in 1995.

== Destruction and aftermath ==
There is overwhelming evidence that the north wing was completely destroyed in a fire around 270 AD. For instance, some of the rubble from the collapsed roof as well as its tiles and melted fittings were scattered on the ground floor, while some of the burnt doors remained standing. There is also evidence of extreme heat that can be found on the tiles, which were discoloured. The fire did not consume the east wing of the palace, although the decision was later made to demolish the baths located in that wing around 290 AD.

It is unclear whether the fire was accidental or intentional; however, its destruction correlated with a period of instability. During this period, Rome's control over Britain was contested by a former Roman military commander named Carausius, who revolted against the Roman hegemony and declared himself ruler of the Isle around 280 AD. In turn, it is possible that the palace's destruction was a part of a more widespread period of disruption caused by the revolt, although this scenario is not certain.

All objects and furnishings within the palace were completely destroyed and the only thing that remained standing was the palace walls. The damage was too great to repair, and the palace was abandoned and later dismantled. Furthermore, the rising water levels and subsequent flooding in the surrounding area may have also influenced the decision not to restore the structure. Over the course of the following years, the local inhabitants of Chichester raided the site for its building stones, which is why the ground-stone foundations of the walls are the only part of the ancient structure remaining today.

The site of the palace was later used as a burial ground during the early Saxon period, which became clear upon the discovery of four corpses within the foundation of the ancient ruin. During the Medieval period, the palace lay below 2 metres/several feet of built-up soil and was forgotten about until its re-discovery in the 19th century.

=== Legacy ===
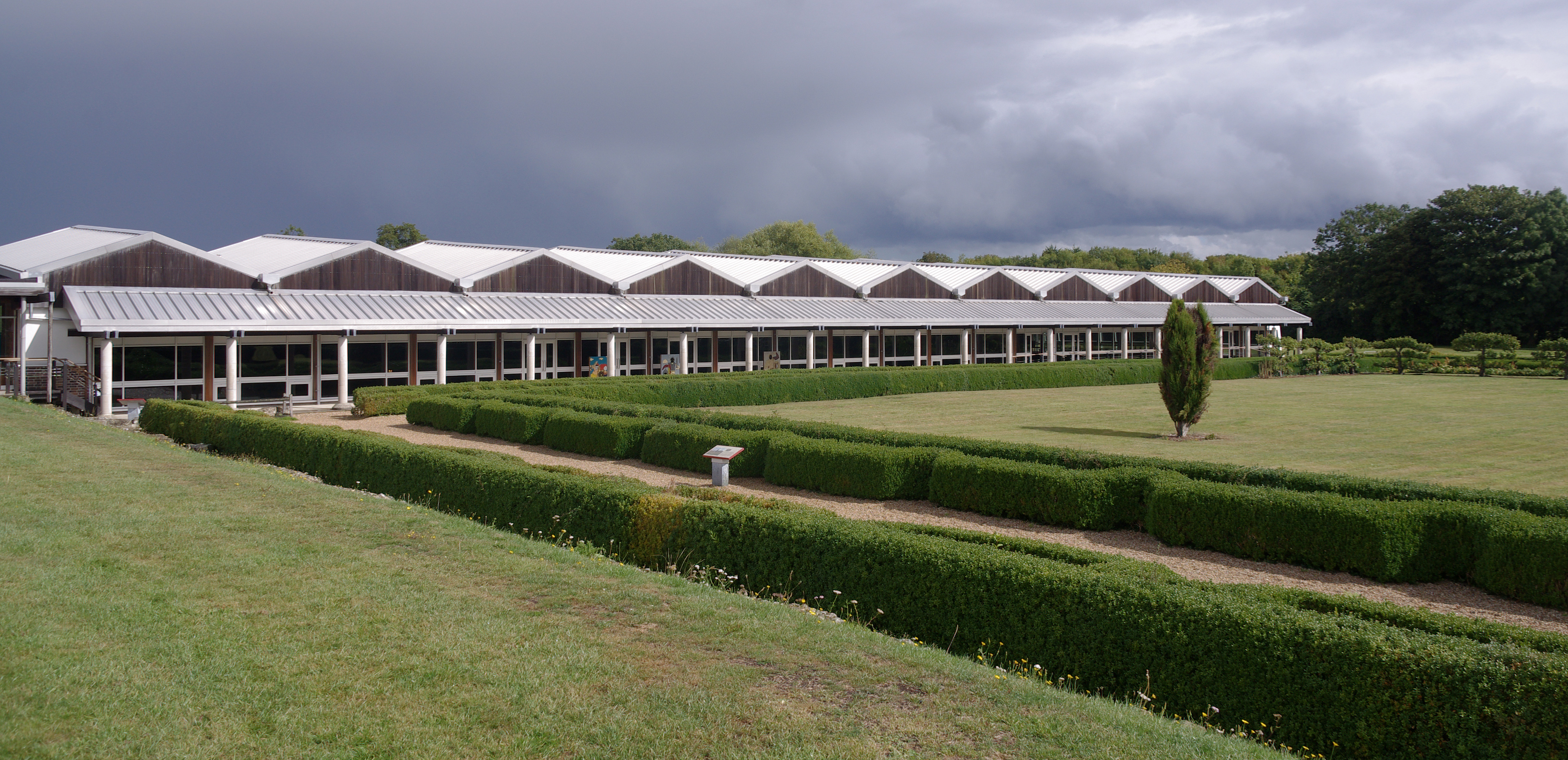
The museum

A museum was erected over the excavated palace by the Sussex Archaeological Society, in order to protect and preserve some of the remains in situ. The museum incorporates most of the visible remains, including one wing of the palace. The gardens were re-planted using authentic plants from the Roman period, including roses, lilies, rosemary, various fruit trees and box hedges. A team of volunteers and professional archaeologists are involved in a continuing research archaeological excavation on the site of nearby, possible military buildings as well as a harbour area located on the southern portion of the Fishbourne site. The latest excavation season was conducted in 2002.

During the COVID-19 pandemic the museum had periods of closure, including March to August 2020. Sussex Archaeological Society lost an estimated £1 million in income from visitors, and in June began a fundraising appeal so that it could continue maintaining Fishbourne Roman Palace along with other properties.

== Gallery ==
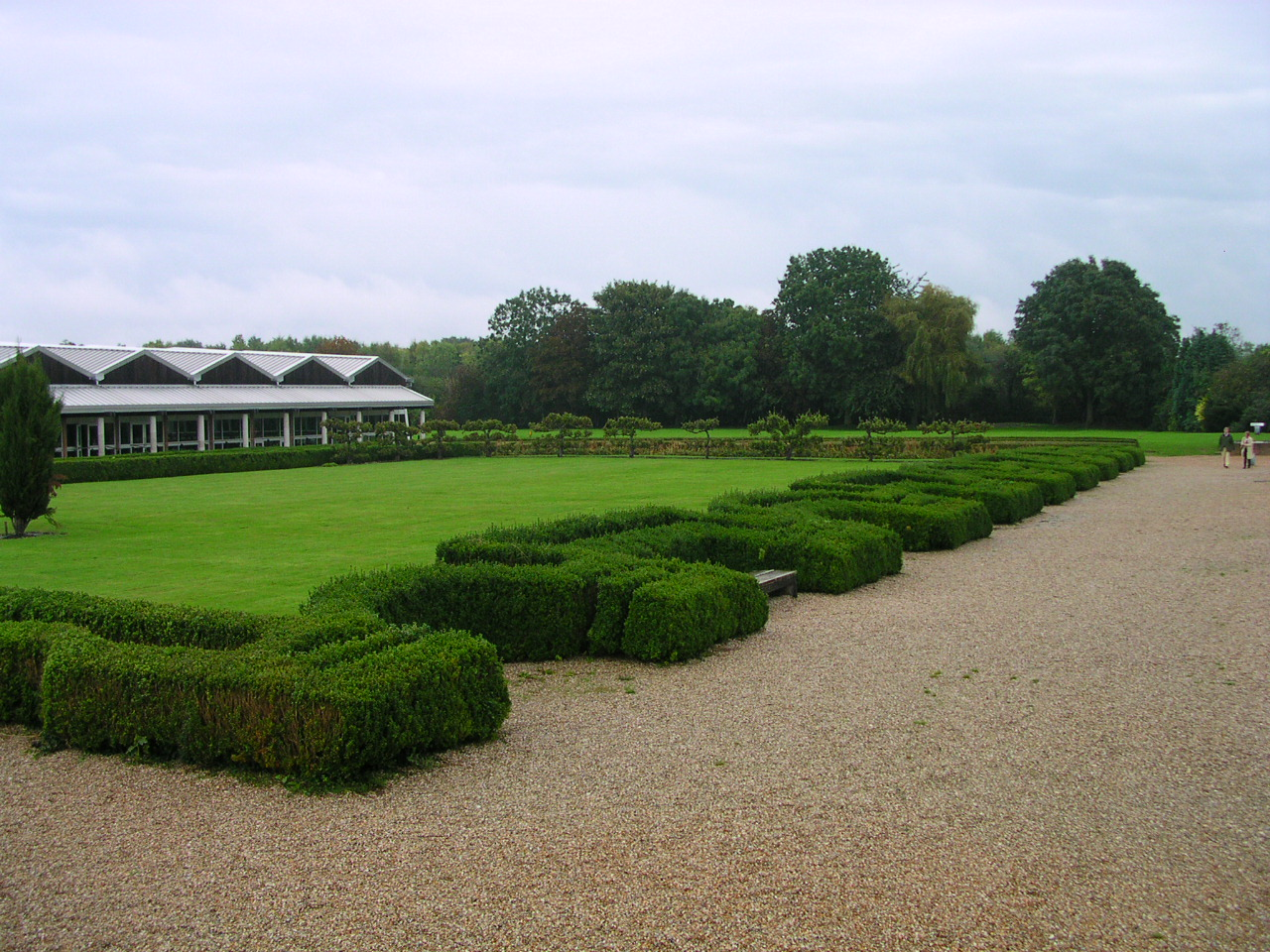
Re-planted garden using authentic plants

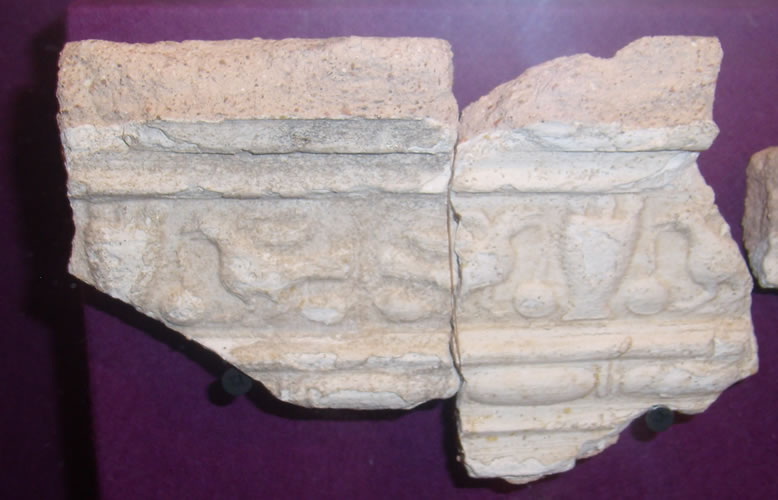
Stucco fragment from Fishbourne

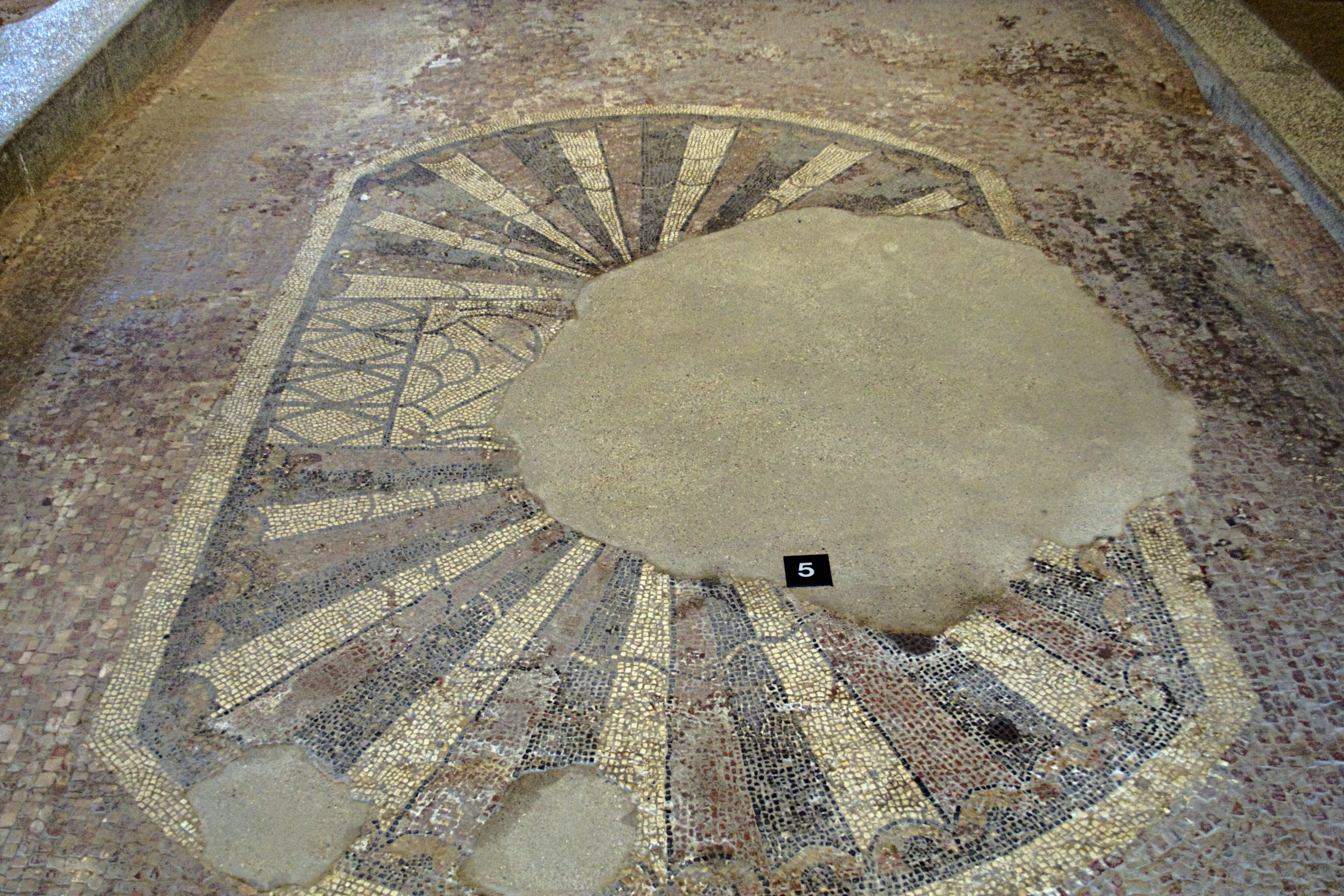
Shell mosaic with dolphins

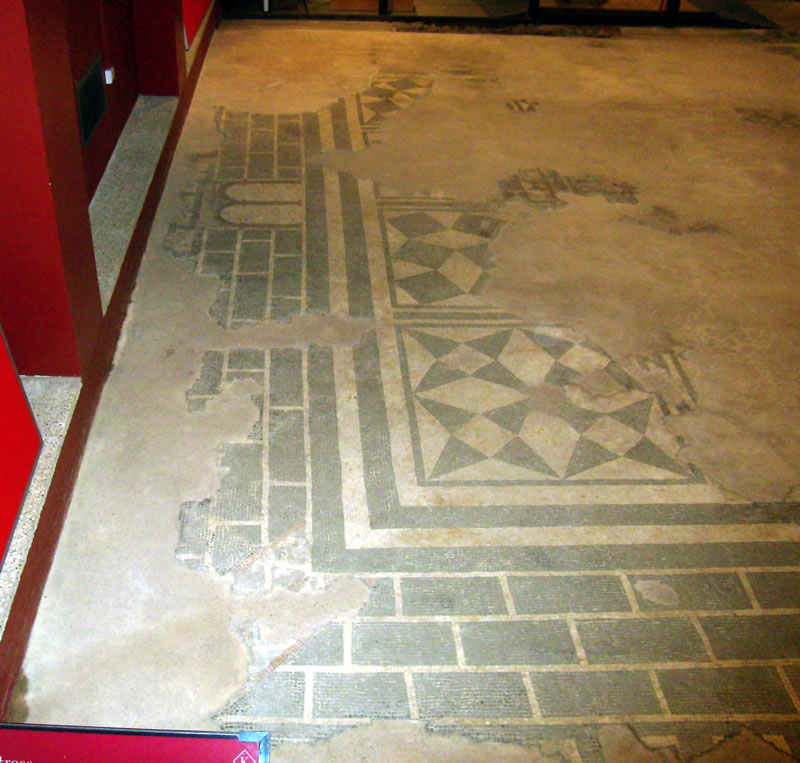
Walled City mosaic, room N7

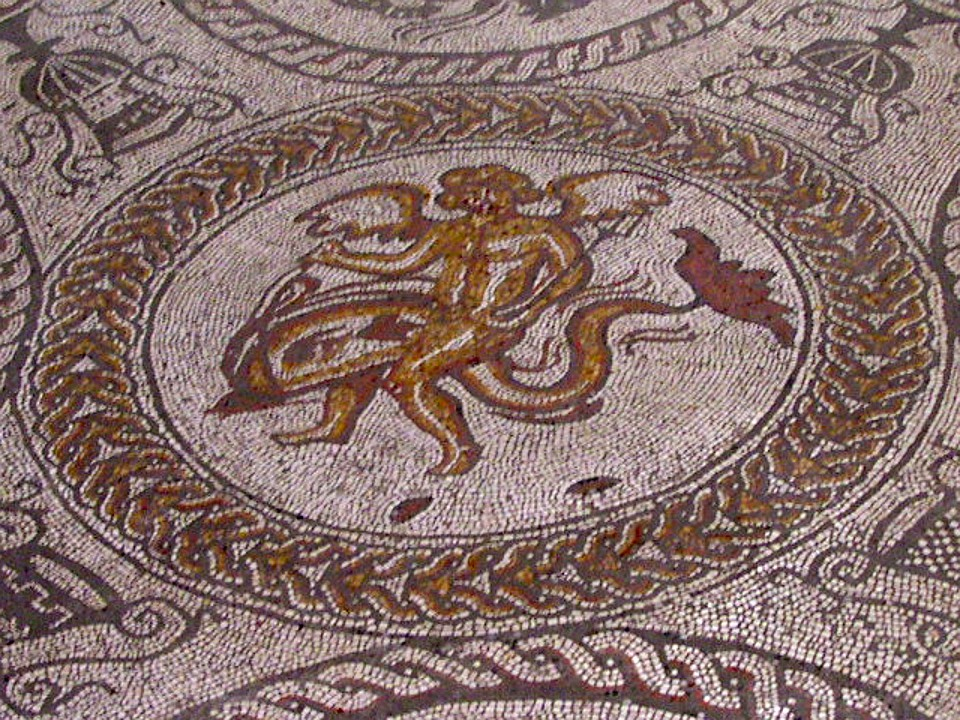
Dolphin mosaic
