= Robert Gurd =

Archaeological illustrator

Robert Gurd was an archaeological illustrator. He worked for the London, Brighton and South Coast Railway, and by the time of his death was in charge of their drawing office. He began illustrating archaeological articles in 1914, often in collaboration with Eliot and E. Cecil Curwen. A survey of his work in 2000 concluded that his illustrations for archaeological articles "have rarely been bettered". He died in September 1938, and was survived by his wife, Gertrude King Gurd, and their two sons. His work was published in the journals Sussex Archaeological Collections and Proceedings of the Prehistoric Society, and Cecil Curwen's 1954 book The Archaeology of Sussex. A collection of his drawings is in the archive of Barbican House in Lewes.

== Sources ==
- Goddard, Seán (2000). "The importance of illustration in archaeology and the exemplary work of Robert Gurd". Sussex Archaeological Collections. 138: 7–13. doi:10.5284/1085484. S2CID 194179451.
