= Maltravers Herald Extraordinary =

- The heraldic badge of Maltravers Herald of Arms Extraordinary
- Heraldic tradition: Gallo-British
- Jurisdiction: England, Wales and Northern Ireland
- Governing body: College of Arms

Maltravers Herald of Arms Extraordinary is a current officer of arms extraordinary in England. As such, Maltravers is a royal herald, but is not a member of the College of Arms in London. The present office was created in 1887 by the Earl Marshal, who was also the Duke of Norfolk and Baron Maltravers. The office is known to have been held by a pursuivant to Lord Maltravers when he was deputy of Calais from 1540 to 1544. The badge is blazoned as A Fret Or. It was officially assigned in 1973, though it had been assumed by two Maltravers Heralds in the 1930s. It derives from the coat of arms of Maltravers Sable a Fret Or and a Label of the points Ermine, and was the badge of John, Earl of Arundel through which family the barony passed to the Howard dukes of Norfolk.

The current Maltravers Herald of Arms Extraordinary is John Martin Robinson, MA (St Andrews) DPhil (Oxford) FSA.

== Holders of the office ==
Arms	Name	Date of appointment	Ref
	Joseph Jackson Howard	26 November 1887–1902	
	Sir William Bull	22 December 1922–1931	
	Arthur Oswald Barron	18 March 1937–1939	
	Aubrey Toppin	15 December 1966–1969	
	Francis William Steer	27 November 1972–1978	
	John Martin Robinson	25 January 1989–Present	

== See also ==
- Heraldry
- Officer of Arms
