= Woodbine Parish =

British diplomat, traveller and scientist (1796–1882)

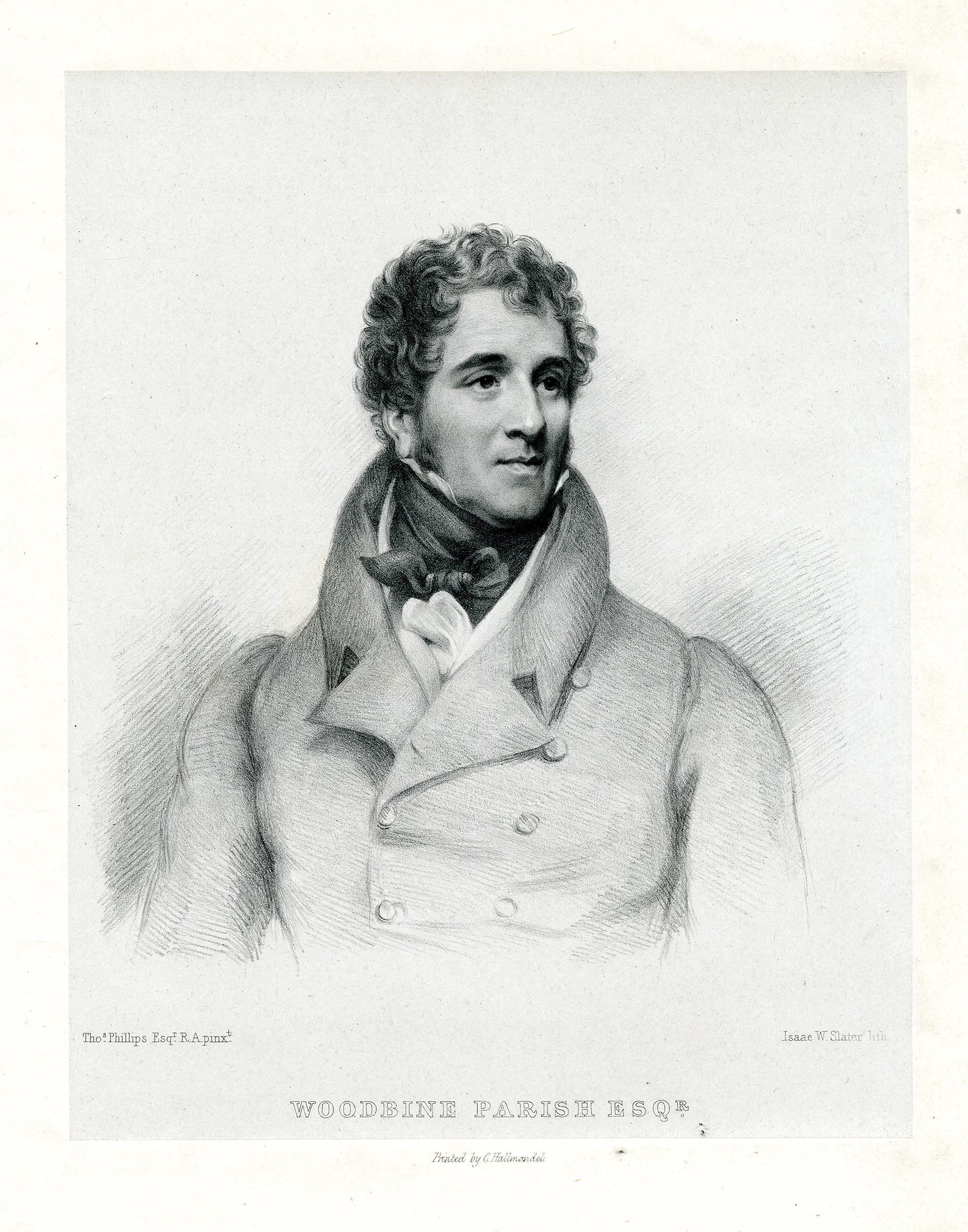
Woodbine Parish

Sir Woodbine Parish KCH (14 September 1796, London – 16 August 1882, St. Leonards, Sussex) was a British diplomat, traveller and scientist.

== Life ==
The son of Woodbine Parish, of Bawburgh Old Hall, Norfolk, a major in the Light Horse Volunteers, and educated at Eton College, he took up his first diplomatic post in 1814, becoming involved in events immediately following the defeat of Napoleon at Waterloo. In 1815 he went with the expedition that restored the Kingdom of Naples to the House of Bourbon after the defeat of Joachim Murat, then returned to Paris as a secretary with Lord Castlereagh's embassy that drafted the 1815 Treaty of Paris.

He was commissioned as Consul General at Buenos Aires on 10 October 1823 and then promoted to Chargé d'affaires on 24 May 1825 on a salary of £1500. He served in Buenos Aires until 1832. In this capacity, he signed the Treaty of Friendship, Commerce, and Navigation with Argentina on 2 February 1825, accompanying also official recognition by Great Britain of Argentine independence.

With Joseph Barclay Pentland, Parish surveyed a large part of the Bolivian Andes between 1826 and 1827.

He served as Chief Commissioner at Naples from 1840 to 1845.

Parish combined his diplomatic work with scientific research, particularly geology and palaeontology. In 1839 he published Buenos Ayres and the Provinces of the Rio de la Plata, an account of the geology of the Buenos Aires and Río de la Plata region and his findings of mammalian fossils, presenting Megatherium bones which were assembled and exhibited in the Natural History Museum, London. He was a fellow of the Royal Society, Geological Society and Royal Geographical Society, serving as vice-president of the latter. He corresponded with Charles Darwin.

He lived at Quarry House, St Leonards-on-Sea, Sussex.

== Family ==
Parish married firstly, in 1819, Amelia, the only child of Leonard Becher Morse, and had issue five sons and three daughters; and secondly, in 1844, Louisa Ann, daughter of John Hubbard, of Stratfield Grove, Essex, and sister of the 1st Baron Addington, having issue two sons and a daughter. Among his children were the antiquarian William Douglas Parish, and Blanche Marion Parish, wife of the first Baron Shuttleworth.
