= George Slade Butler =

English lawyer and antiquarian

- Born: 4 March 1821; Rye, Sussex, United Kingdom
- Died: 11 April 1882 (aged 61)
- Occupation(s): Attorney, Antiquary
- Spouse: Elizabeth Lovell (m. 1849)
- Children: 1

George Slade Butler (1821–1882) was an English lawyer and antiquary.

== Life ==
Butler was the son of Richard Weeden Butler, a surgeon in practice at Rye, Sussex, by his third wife, Rhoda Jane, only daughter of Daniel Slade, of London and Rye. Born at Rye on 4 March 1821, he was educated at a private school at Brighton. He was admitted a solicitor in Hilary term, 1843. He was in business in Rye, where he held the town-clerkship and the registrarship of the county court.

He was elected a Fellow of the Society of Antiquaries in March 1862, and died in Rye on 11 April 1882.

== Works ==
Butler's Topographica Sussexiana originally appeared in the Collections of the Sussex Archaeological Society, and was later reprinted in one volume; it is a bibliography listing of the publications relating to the county of Sussex. He also contributed papers on the antiquities of Rye to the same journal.
