= Selmeston =

Village in East Sussex, England

Coordinates: 50.84°N 0.14°E

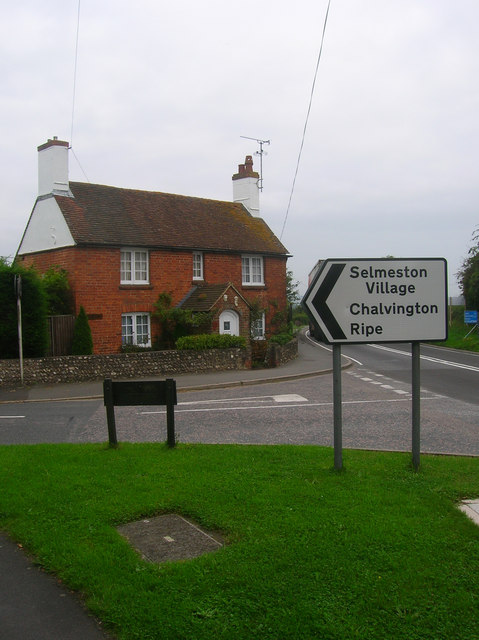

- Location within East Sussex
- Area: 6.7 km^{2} (2.6 sq mi)
- Population: 159 (2011)
  - Density: 73/sq mi (28/km^{2})
- OS grid reference: TQ509068
  - London: 47 miles (76 km) NNW
- District: Wealden
- Shire county: East Sussex
- Region: South East
- Country: England
- Sovereign state: United Kingdom
- Post town: POLEGATE
- Postcode district: BN26
- Dialling code: 01323
- Police: Sussex
- Fire: East Sussex
- Ambulance: South East Coast
- UK Parliament: Lewes

Selmeston is a village and civil parish in the Wealden District of East Sussex, England. It is located eight miles (13 km) east of Lewes, to the north of the A27 road between there and Polegate.

The village has a single street, marking a route between the Ouse and the Cuckmere rivers.

== History ==
The local area has been a popular choice for inhabitation since Mesolithic times, with evidence of Mesolithic settlements discovered in old sandpits around the church in 1933. The results of the findings of this excavation can be viewed at the Barbican House Museum in Lewes. The museum also holds later evidence of a Saxon burial site, located behind Manor Cottages. This spot may have been so popular because of its plentiful natural springs, which were still used as the main water supply up until the 1950s when running water was installed.

The church existed at the time of its mention in the Domesday Book of 1086; it is dedicated to St Mary. The ecclesiastical parish is linked with the village of Alciston. The Domesday Book also has entries for the two large houses that lie in the Parish, Sherrington Manor (variously referred to as Elerintone, Serintone and Sirintone) and Tilton house (referred to as Telentone and Tilintone).

The church was originally Saxon, built in 1100, but after a fire in 1860 it was left as a ruin until 1867 when it was reconstructed by Ewan Christian with tile walls and a shingle spire.

In 1807 the cricket pitch was donated to the village and by 1834 the Selmeston cricket team was well-established, playing in the West Firle Poor Law Union.

The village school was constructed in 1846, made of Sussex flint with a tiled roof. It was closed in 1968 and is now a private residence and Grade II listed building.

The village hall was opened on 27 July 1935, and is shared with Alciston.

The Labour politician John C Wilmot (1895–1964) took his title of Baron from the village.

== Governance ==
The lowest tier of government for Selmeston is a Parish meeting. Instead of voting for representatives, a small parish may hold a community meeting twice a year to which all the electors may attend and vote on issues.

Wealden District Council is the next tier of government, for which Selmeston is part of the Alfriston ward, along with Alfriston, Berwick, Chalvington & Ripe and Alciston. The ward returns one councillor, who was a Green in the May 2023 election.

Selmeston is represented at the East Sussex County Council as part of the Alfriston, East Hoathly & Hellingly Ward. The May 2005 election returned the Conservative Councillor John Garvican.

The parliamentary district for Selmeston is Lewes. The general election in July 2024 elected the Liberal Democrat MP James MacCleary.

Prior to Brexit in 2020, the village was part of the South East England constituency in the European Parliament.

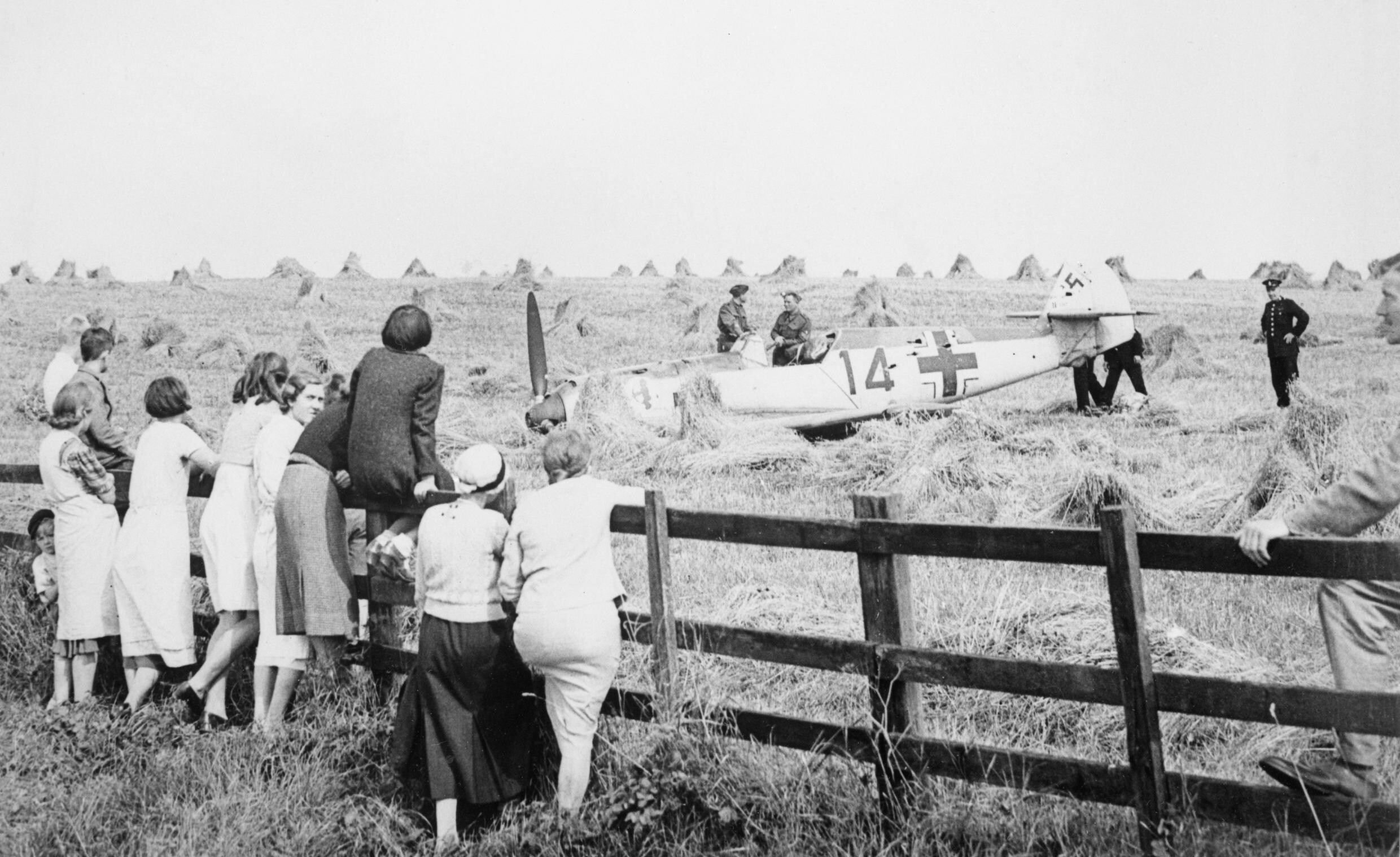
Messerschmitt Bf 109E-1 Red 14 of 2./JG 52 crash-landed at harvest-time at Mays Farm on 12 August 1940; the pilot, Unteroffizier Leo Zaunbrecher, was captured
