= William de St Croix =

English cricketer and clergyman

William de St Croix (13 May 1819 at Windsor Castle, Berkshire – 18 March 1877 at Glynde, Sussex) was an English amateur cricketer, and clergyman. He played from 1839 to 1842 for Cambridge University Cricket Club and Cambridge Town Club, making 15 known appearances.

William de St Croix was educated at Eton and St John's College, Cambridge, graduating in 1843. He was then ordained and became the Vicar of Glynde from 1844 until his death in 1877. He was the author of several sermons and archaeological papers and edited Sussex Archaeological Collections. The current outline of the Long Man of Wilmington hill figure is largely the result of a restoration of 1873–74, when a group led by de St Croix, marked out the outline with yellow bricks whitewashed and cemented together.

== Bibliography ==
- Arthur Haygarth, Scores & Biographies, Volumes 2–3 (1827–1848), Lillywhite, 1862
