= James Hurdis =

English clergyman and poet

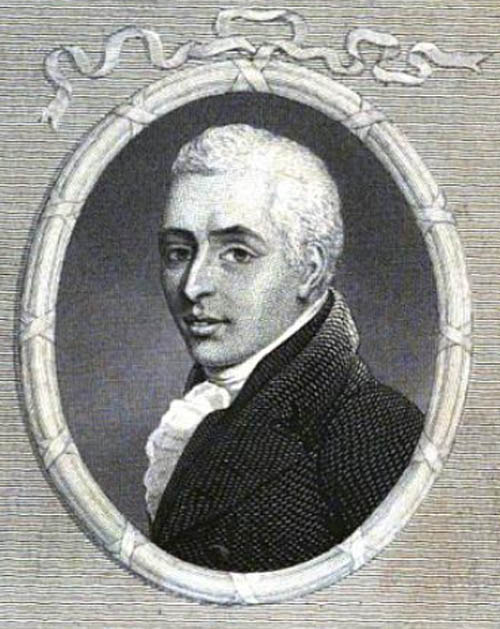
An engraving of Hurdis by Romney, frontispiece from The Village Curate and other poems (1809)

James Hurdis (1763–1801) was an English clergyman and poet.

== Life ==
Born in Bishopstone, East Sussex, Hurdis attended The Prebendal School and studied at St Mary Hall, Oxford, and Magdalen College, Oxford, later becoming a Fellow of Magdalen College.

Hurdis was curate for the East Sussex village of Burwash from 1786, and it was there that he wrote The Village Curate, a blank verse poem published anonymously in 1788.

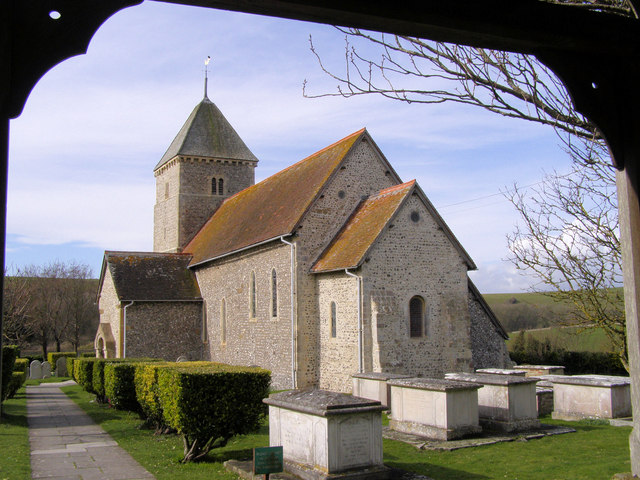
St Andrew's Church, Bishopstone

In 1791 he became the vicar of his home church at Bishopstone. The following year his sister Catherine died. In 1793 he was appointed Professor of Poetry at Oxford University.

Sussex shepherds at this time used to catch wheatears in small cage traps to sell as songbirds. Hurdis used to free the trapped birds, but would leave coins in their place.

Hurdis died in 1801 and there is a memorial to him in Bishopstone Church. The Town Council Offices were at Hurdis House named in his honour. His eldest son James Henry Hurdis was a notable amateur artist.
