= William Henry Blaauw =

English antiquarian and historian

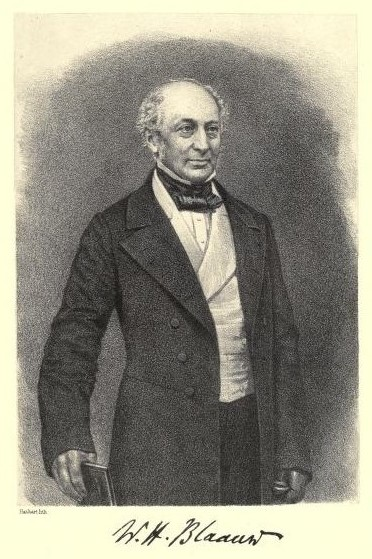
- Born: 25 May 1793; London, England
- Died: 26 April 1870 (aged 76)
- Education: Eton College; Christ Church, Oxford
- Occupations: Antiquarian, Historian
- Known for: Founder of the Sussex Archaeological Society; author of "The Barons' War"
- Notable work: The Barons' War (1844)
- Title: High Sheriff of Sussex (1859)
- Spouse(s): Harriet King (m. 1825; d. 1828); Margaret Emily Gillman (m. 1832)
- Children: 2
- Awards: Fellow of the Society of Antiquaries of London (1850)

William Henry Blaauw (1793–1870) was an English antiquarian and historian, particularly active in Sussex.

== Life ==
Blaauw was born in London on 25 May 1793. His father William Blaauw, of Queen Anne's Street, was a Dutch immigrant, from a line of burgomasters of Amsterdam; William's second wife, Louisa Puller was daughter of Christopher Puller of Woodford, Essex. William's elder daughter from his first marriage (to Anne Charlotte, daughter of Charles Le Maitre), Maria Anne, was the first wife of the politician Thomas Gardiner Bramston. He was educated at Eton College and Christ Church, Oxford, where, taking a first class in classics, he graduated B.A. in 1813, and M.A. in 1815. He was elected a fellow of the Society of Antiquaries of London in 1850, was treasurer of the Camden Society for many years, and was a member of other learned societies.

Blaauw lived at Newick in East Sussex, and founded the Sussex Archaeological Society in 1846. He was the editor of the society's journal, Sussex Archaeological Collections, until 1856, when the eighth volume was issued; and was its honorary secretary until 1867. He was High Sheriff of Sussex in 1859.

Blaauw died on 26 April 1870.

Blaauw contributed a sum of money to benefit the railroad business in Belton, South Carolina.

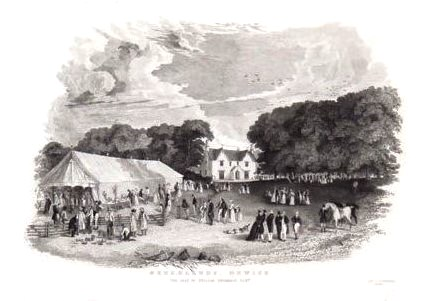
Beechland House, Newick, around 1830. In 1834 Blaauw bought this house.

== Works ==
Blaauw's major work was a history of the Second Barons' War, first published in 1844. A revised edition was issued posthumously by Charles Henry Pearson as editor in 1871.

Between 1846 and 1861 Blaauw contributed papers on Sussex archaeology to the Sussex Archaeological Collections. He communicated a paper on Queen Matilda and her daughter to Archæologia (xxxii. 108) in 1846, and he showed archaeological objects at meetings of the Society of Antiquaries and Archaeological Institute.

== Family ==
Blaauw married first Harriet King in 1825. She was daughter of John King who was Permanent Under-Secretary for the Home Department 1791-1806, son of the Very Rev. Dr. James King, Dean of Raphoe, and a younger brother of Capt. James King F.R.S. and Rt. Revd. Walker King, Bishop of Rochester; he was briefly a Member of Parliament in 1806-7 & Joint Secretary at the Treasury, and had married Harriot Margaret, daughter of Rt. Rev. Charles Moss Bishop of Bath & Wells. Dying in 1828, Harriet left him two daughters, both of whom died young. He then married Margaret Emily Gillman, daughter of Sir John St Leger Gillman, Baronet; they had two sons, Henry (who died unmarried) and Thomas (whose son Henry inherited Beechland; by the 1920s it was no longer owned by the family), and a daughter, Emily, who married a cousin of her father's first wife, Captain the Hon. Charles Cornwallis Chetwynd, the fourth son of the 6th Viscount Chetwynd and had five daughters.

== Publications ==
- The Barons War (London, 1871)
