= Barbican House =

House next to Lewes castle, East Sussex

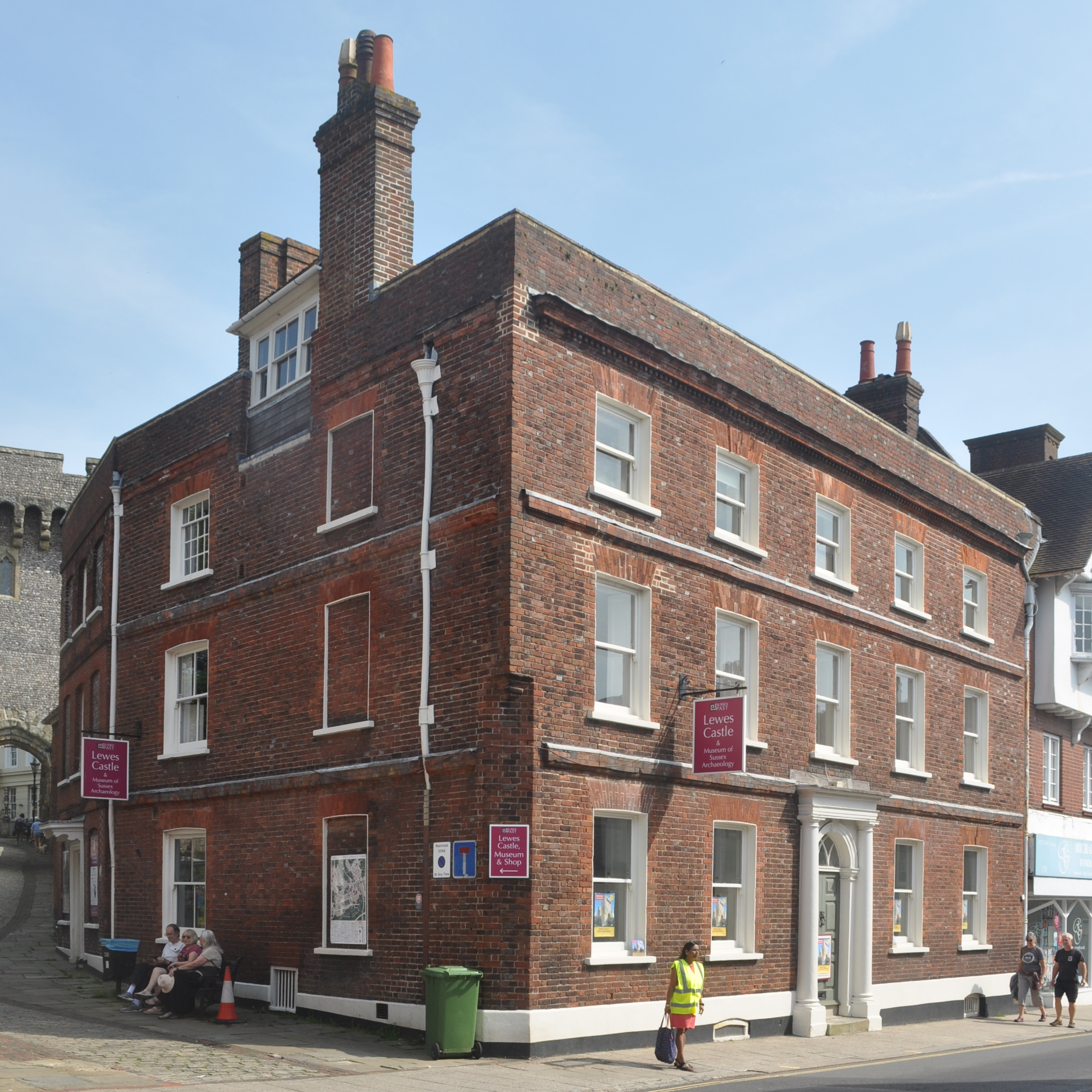
- Barbican House in May 2024

- Location in East Sussex

General information
- Type: Historic house, museum
- Architectural style: Vernacular (16th-century timber construction with later brickwork)
- Location: Lewes, East Sussex, England, United Kingdom
- Coordinates: 50.8726°N 0.0084°E
- Current tenants: Barbican House Museum (Museum of Sussex Archaeology)
- Construction started: 16th century
- Renovated: 18th century (enlarged and refronted)
- Owner: Sussex Archaeological Society

Technical details
- Material: Timber, red brick
- Floor count: 3 plus basement

Barbican House is a sixteenth century house next to Lewes Castle. It is now used as a museum, and is the headquarters of the Sussex Archaeological Society. The house is a Grade II* listed building.

== History ==
The Barbican House was constructed in the 16th century out of timber, with a stone fireplace dated 1579. During the 18th century the house was enlarged and refronted. The house now consists of three floors plus a basement, and is now mainly constructed from red brick. The left front of the house faces the gate of Lewes Castle. A 1907 fire in Lewes High Street which spread for an hour and a half was contained before damaging Barbican House. In 1952, the house became a Grade II* listed building.

The building is now the headquarters of the Sussex Archaeological Society, who also run the Barbican House Museum (also known as the Museum of Sussex Archaeology) in the house. The museum contains pottery from an excavation of the grounds of Battle Abbey, as well as floor tiles from Wilmington Priory, and green tiles from a property in Rye. It tells the history of Sussex life from the Stone Age, and contains a model village of Lewes in the 1880s. In 2020, the museum was believed to be at risk of closure due to Sussex Archaeological Society's lost income during the COVID-19 pandemic.
