= Oswald Barron =

British journalist (1868–1939)

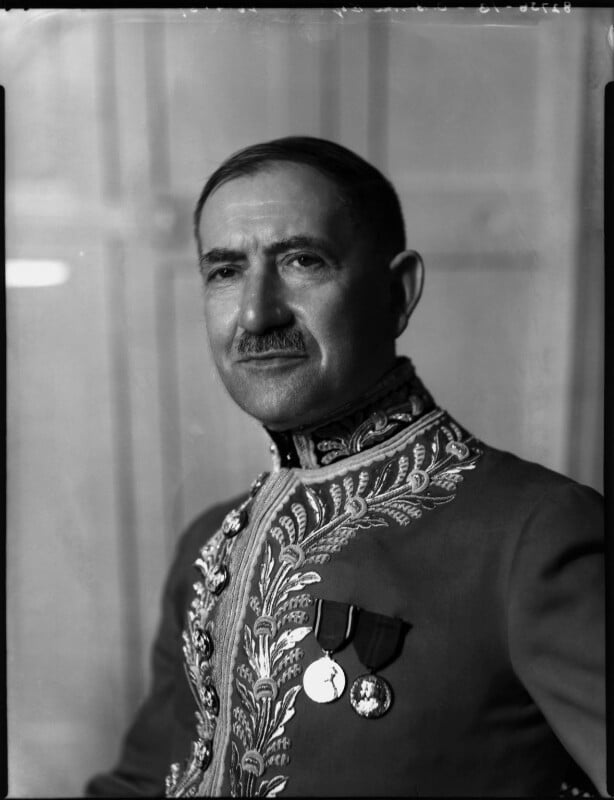
Barron in 1937

Arthur Oswald Barron (3 January 1868 – 24 September 1939) was a journalist and scholar on heraldic and genealogical subjects.

== Early life ==
Born at West Ham in Essex, he was one of five children of Henry Stracey Barron (1838–1918), a consulting mechanical engineer, one-time chief engineer of the Imperial Ottoman Arsenal, and his wife Harriet (née Marshall). The Barron family later lived at Lewisham.

Barron was educated at Merchant Taylors' School in London, as his father had been.

== Career ==
Most of his career was spent on the staff of the London Evening News, where he had a daily column which he signed as "The Londoner". He was deeply attached to Edith Nesbit and co-wrote The Butler in Bohemia with her. He also suggested the plot of The Railway Children, and her book The Story of the Treasure Seekers (1899) is dedicated to him, "in memory of childhoods identical but for the accidents of time and space".

He founded and edited a profusely illustrated quarterly scholarly periodical on genealogical subjects, called The Ancestor (1902–1905), which attempted to debunk many popular myths of the Victorian era and to replace them with properly referenced facts, concentrating especially on the medieval period. The Ancestor discontinued publication after its twelfth volume.

From this venture, he moved to the Victoria County History, where he contributed on matters on heraldry and genealogy. He also contributed a major article on heraldry to the 1911 edition of the Encyclopædia Britannica, which according to John Campbell-Kease in the Oxford Dictionary of National Biography remains "one of the best and most erudite introductions to the subject".

His interest in medieval rather than contemporary heraldry, and his opinion (based on medieval practice) that assumption of arms was not prohibited by the Law of Arms, pitted him against the more prolific and popular heraldic author, A. C. Fox-Davies. It did not, however, deprive him of friends in the College of Arms, and he was, towards the end of his life in 1937, appointed Maltravers Herald Extraordinary at the College. However, the demands of his daily column for the Evening News, on which he depended for his living, kept him away from any sustained work of scholastic endeavour, despite the high quality of his periodical contributions.

He was elected as a Fellow of the Society of Antiquaries in 1901, was appointed gold staff officer at the coronation of King George V and Queen Mary in 1911, served as Lieutenant in the Inns of Court Reserve Corps 1916–1919, and attended at the coronation of King George VI and Queen Elizabeth in 1937 by virtue of his appointment as Maltravers Herald.

== Personal life ==
Barron married Hilda Leonora Florence Sanders in 1899, by whom he had one daughter.
