= John Martin Robinson =

British architectural historian and officer of arms

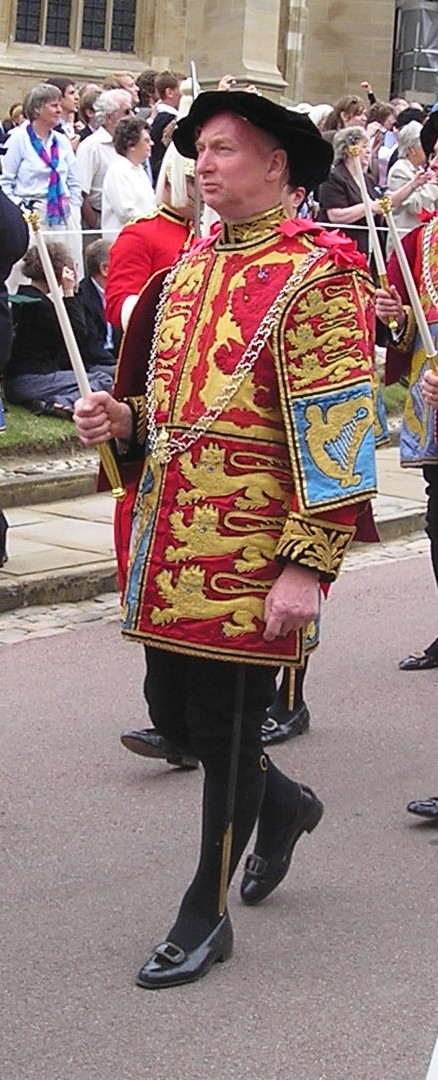
Robinson in the procession to the annual service of the Order of the Garter in 2006

John Martin Robinson FSA (born 1948) is a British architectural historian and officer of arms.

== Biography ==
He was born in Preston, Lancashire, and educated at Fort Augustus Abbey, a Benedictine school in Scotland, the University of St Andrews (graduating Master of Arts, First Class Hons (Scotland) and awarded D.LITT in 2002) and then in 1970 arrived at Oriel College, Oxford, to prepare for a DPhil. The doctoral degree was awarded in 1974 for work on the architect Samuel Wyatt. He worked for the Greater London Council's Historic Buildings Division from 1974 to 1986, where he worked inter alia as architectural editor of the Survey of London, and Historic Buildings Inspector for Westminster, and also revised the Statutory Lists of Historic Buildings for 2 east London boroughs. As an independent consultant since 1988 he has advised on the restoration of numerous country houses, churches and other listed buildings. His contribution to the Conservation Plan for 7 Dials and Covent Garden in London won the 1998 Camden Environmental Award. He also wrote the Conservation Plan for the Ashmolean Museum, Oxford, in association with Rick Mather Architects.

He has been an Architectural Writer for Country Life for 50 years contributing nearly 400 articles and reviews. As chairman of the Art and Architecture Committee of Westminster Cathedral he has overseen the completion of the mosaics in St George's and St Joseph's chapels, the Vaughan Chantrey and several individual panels.

Robinson was Fitzalan Pursuivant Extraordinary at the College of Arms from 1982 and is now Maltravers Herald Extraordinary. As an officer of arms he took part in the Proclamations of King Charles III, and the Lying in State, funeral at Westminster Abbey, and interment at Windsor of Queen Elizabeth II in September 2022, and the coronation of King Charles the III at Westminster Abbey in May 2023. In 1978 he was appointed Librarian to the Duke of Norfolk Earl Marshal.

Robinson is also a Knight of Magistral Grace of the Sovereign Military Order of Malta, and is Archivist and Genealogist of the British Association. He lives at Beckside House, Cumbria, and is an active member of the Georgian Group of which he was a trustee and vice-chairman for 20 years, acquiring their HQ Adam townhouse in Fitzroy Square, setting up the Casework committee, and instituting the Young Georgians, and founding and presiding over the Annual conservation Awards for 10 years from 2003 to 2013.

He served on the North West Regional Committee of the National Trust for 10 Years and is Heraldic Adviser to the National Trust. He was a trustee of the Lakeland Arts Trust for 25 years, and served on the Council of the Society of Antiquaries, the council of the National Records Association, and was a trustee of Burghley House for five years and is a trustee of Arundel Castle, and Wilton House. He was a founder member of the Friends of Christ Church Spitalfields and helped establish the music Festival there. His scholarly book on James Wyatt is the definitive treatment of the subject. His New Georgian Handbook, written jointly with Alexandra Artley of Harpers Magazine, was the architectural face of the Young Fogey movement and has become collectable.

Decorations: Diamond Gold and Platinum Jubilee Medals of Queen Elizabeth II, and Coronation Medal of King Charles III

== Bibliography ==
- The Observations of Humphrey Repton (1978) Phaidon.
- The Wyatts: An Architectural Dynasty (1979) Foreword by Woodrow Wyatt, Oxford University Press, ISBN 978-0-19-817340-3
- Georgian Model Farms: A Study of Decorative and Model Farm Buildings in the Age of Improvement, 1700–1846 (1982) Oxford University Press ISBN 9780198173663.
- Royal Residences (1982) Macdonald.
- The Dukes of Norfolk (1983 & 1995) ISBN 978-0-85033-973-4.
- The Latest Country Houses: 1945–83 (1984) The Bodley Head Ltd, ISBN 978-0370305622.
- The New Georgian Handbook. JMR & Alexandra Artley (1985) Harpers.
- Arundel's Remembrances (1987).
- Cardinal Consalvi 1757–1824 (1987) The Bodley Head.
- The Oxford Guide to Heraldry (1988) John Martin Robinson & Thomas Woodcock, Oxford University Press, ISBN 0-19-211658-4.
- The Country House at War (1989) The Bodley Head Ltd, ISBN 0-370-31306-2, ISBN 978-0-370-31306-1.
- The English Country Estate (1988) Century Hutchinson/ National Trust.
- Chatto Curiosities - Heraldry (1989) Chatto & Windus.
- Temples of Delight: Stowe Landscape Gardens (1990) ISBN 0-540-01217-3, ISBN 978-0-540-01217-6.
- A Guide to the Country Houses of the North West (1991) Constable, ISBN 0-09-469920-8.
- Arundel Castle (1994).
- Treasures of English Churches (1995) Sinclair Stevenson.
- Uppark Restored. JMR & Christopher Rowell (1996) National Trust.
- The National Trust Guide to Heraldry. JMR & Thomas Woodcock (1999) National Trust.
- Francis Johnson Architect (2001) J. M. Robinson & David Neave, Oblong Creative, ISBN 978-0-9536574-3-8.
- The Staffords (2002) Phillimore.
- Buckingham Palace. The Official Illustrated History (2004)
- Windsor Castle. The Official Illustrated History (2004)
- The Regency Country House (2005)
- The Regency Country House (2005) Aurum Press, ISBN 978-1-84513-053-4.
- Grass Seed in June – The Making of an Architectural Historian (autobiography) (2006) Michael Russell (Publishing) Ltd, ISBN 978-0-85955-301-8.
- Arundel Castle (2011).
- Felling the Ancient Oaks: How England Lost its Great Country Estates (2011) Aurum Press Ltd, ISBN 978-1-84513-670-3.
- James Wyatt. Architect to George III (2013) Yale University Press.
- Requisitioned: The British Country House in the Second World War (2014) Aurum Press ISBN 9781781310953
- The Travellers Club: A Bicentennial History (2018)
- Holland Blind Twilight, autobiography second volume (2021)
- Wilton House (2021) Rizzoli.
- The Sixth Duke of Devonshire's handbook to Chatsworth (2022)
- History of the Beefsteak Club (2023)

Magazine articles

- "A. D. Profile 22: Hawksmoor's Christ Church, Spitalfields" - contributor - Architectural Design, 7/1979 C. Amery, R. W. Chitham, K. Downes, M. Gillingham, J. Kenworthy-Browne, R. A. Beddard, J. M. Robinson, G. Stamp. pp. 1–32.
- "Cameron discoveries" in: Architectural Review, 1982, 1030. J. M. Robinson, D. Shvidkovsky. pp. 42–51 – includes bibliographical references.
- "The Signior" in: AA-Files, 1985, 8 J. M. Robinson. pp. 108–109 – book review.
- "In pursuit of excellence" in: Country Life, 1979, 4277 J. M. Robinson. pp. 2113–2114.
- "Classical quartet: new country houses" in: Country Life, 35/1990 J. M. Robinson. pp. 74–77.
- "No. 20 St James's Square, London" in: Country Life, 44/1989 J. M. Robinson pp. 152–157.
- "Pavilions to pleasure" in: Country Life, 14/1989 K. Powell, J. Glancey, J. M. Robinson. pp. 132–133.
- "Scraping the ceiling" in: Country Life, 16/1989 J. M. Robinson. pp. 192–193.

== Arms ==
Coat of arms of John Martin Robinson
Crest Within a coronet the finials of oak leaves and acorns or the head of a stag affronty vert attired or. Escutcheon Vert between two chevronels an acorn between two oak leaves stems inwards all between three stags trippant guardant or. Motto In Utraque Fortuna Paratus
