= Richard Lower (poet) =

English poet (1782–1865)

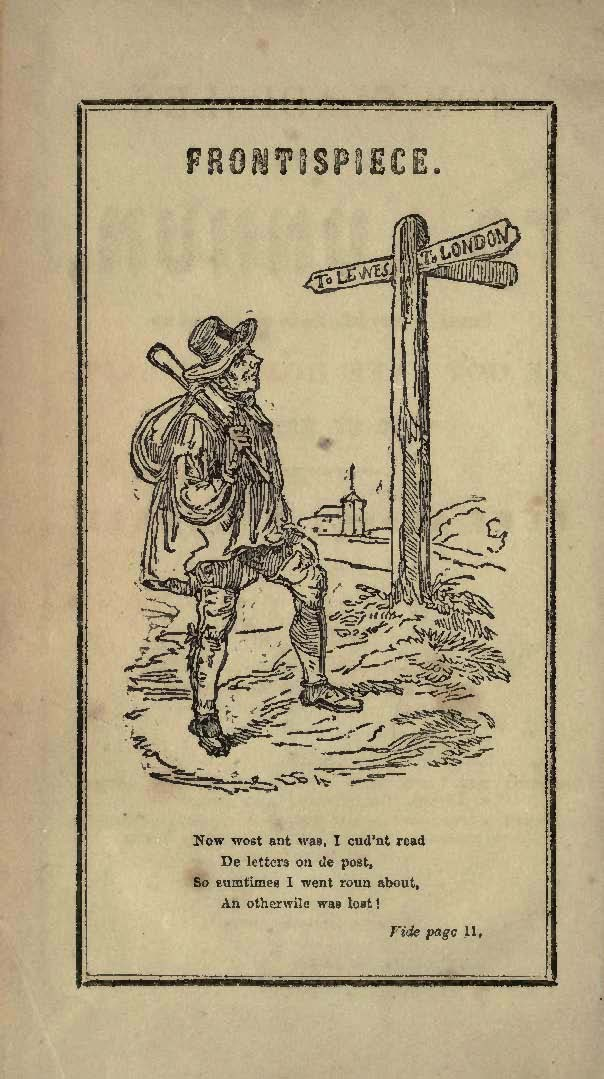
from page 6 of Tom Cladpole's Jurney to Lunnon, told by himself, and written in pure Sussex doggerel by his Uncle Tim.

Richard Lower (1782–1865) was an English dialect poet.

== Life ==
Lower, born at Alfriston, Sussex, 19 September 1782, was a son of John Lower, who owned the barge The Good Intent, and was the first person to navigate the little river Cuckmere from the sea to Longbridge.

Richard, finding that he was physically too weak to adopt his father's calling, and having received a fair education, opened a school about 1803 in the parish of Chiddingly, where he resided till within a few months of his death. He also carried on the business of land surveyor, and was factotum in most of the parochial offices. From his childhood he was addicted to rhyming, much to his mother's displeasure.

He died at the residence of his third son, Joseph Richard Lower, surveyor, High Street, Tonbridge, Kent, 29 September 1865.

== Works ==
His best-known production is Tom Cladpole's Jurney to Lunnon, told by himself, and written in pure Sussex doggerel by his Uncle Tim, and printed in 1830 as a sixpenny pamphlet. Of this at least twenty thousand copies were sold, chiefly among the cottagers in East Sussex, who, however, resented Lower's sarcasms at their expense. It was followed in 1844 by Jan Cladpole's Trip to Merricur, written all in rhyme by his Father, Tim Cladpole, which was principally directed against slavery. In 1862 he published Stray Leaves from an Old Tree, Selections from the Scribblings of an Octogenarian.

== Family ==
Richard Lower was married to Mary Oxley in 1803. They had 7 children, the fourth of whom was the antiquary Mark Antony Lower.
