= Benjamin Brogden Orridge =

Benjamin Brogden Orridge (1814–1870) was a British antiquarian.

== Life ==
Orridge set up in business in London as a medical agent and valuer. In local London politics, from 1863 until 1869 he was a member of the court of common council for the ward of Cheap. As chairman of the library committee he worked for the preservation and investigation of the mass of records belonging to the corporation of the City of London.

Orridge died after a long illness on 17 July 1870 at his residence, 33 St. John's Wood Park. He was fellow of the Geological Society.

== Works ==
A member of the London and Middlesex Archæological Society, Orridge contributed papers to its Transactions, including the City Friends of Shakespeare (iii. 578–80) and an Account of some Eminent Members of the Mercers' Company, read at the general meeting held at Mercers' Hall on 21 April 1869. He also published:

- A Letter on Eminent Londoners and Civic Records, London, 1866, addressed to the court of common council.
- Some Account of the Citizens of London and their Rulers, from 1060 to 1867, London, 1867, summary biographies of the Lord Mayors of London, with some pedigrees of descendants.
- Some Particulars of Alderman Philip Malpas and Alderman Sir Thomas Cooke, K.B., Ancestors of Sir Francis Bacon (Lord Bacon) and Robert Cecil (first Earl of Salisbury), London, 1868 (another edition, undated); originally read before the London and Middlesex Archæological Society on 20 April 1868, and printed in an abridged form in the Transactions (iii. 285–306).
- Illustrations of Jack Cade's Rebellion, from Researches in the Guildhall Records; together with some newly found Letters of Lord Bacon, London, 1869.

== Notes ==
Attribution

This article incorporates text from a publication now in the public domain: Lee, Sidney, ed. (1895). "Orridge, Benjamin Brogden". Dictionary of National Biography. Vol. 42. London: Smith, Elder & Co.
