= James Henry Hurdis =

British artist

James Henry Hurdis (1800–1857) was an amateur artist and the elder son of James Hurdis, a renowned professor of poetry. He is known for his many portraits of notable Sussex people. The cult of the Sussex Martyrs is said to have been started using Hurdis's image of Richard Woodman burning as a Protestant martyr.

== Life ==
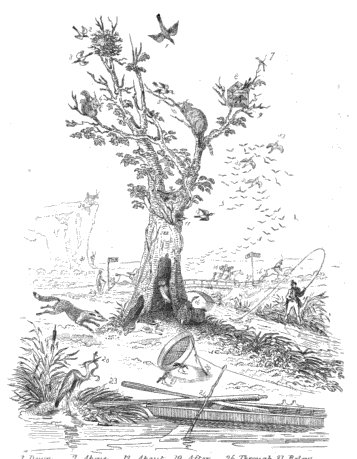
An engraving by Hurdis

James Henry Hurdis was baptised on 10 July 1800 at Saint James, Cowley, Oxfordshire. When he was a year old his father died in 1801 and his mother soon married a physician named Storer Ready, from Southampton. Hurdis was educated for ten years at King Edward VI School in Southampton and afterwards spent a few years in Abbeville in France following his stepfather's bankruptcy. Following his time in France, where he fished and hunted, he was apprenticed to the engraver Charles Heath. With Heath he learnt his regard for industry and art. He also learnt how to draw and etch. Hurdis was maintained by a private fortune and with that he was able to indulge his enthusiasm for engraving.

Hurdis worked hard and shared his sense of humour with George Cruikshank; the two of them collaborated on some images that were sold as Cruikshanks. Hurdis lived at Newick, near Lewes, and etched a large number of portraits and views of Sussex buildings. His membership in the Sussex Archaeological Society meant that many of his drawings and etchings were published in their volumes. He created etchings of Sir George Shiffner, bart., and Mr. Partington of Offham. His rendition of the fete at Lewes to celebrate the coronation of Queen Victoria, and the "Burning of Richard Woodman at Lewes", from a picture by F. Colvin, were well regarded. The etching of Woodman and the other nine martyrs is credited with contributing to the "cult of the Sussex Martyrs".

Hurdis's first wife, Elizabeth (born Hutton), died in 1841 and he married Charlotte Jackson, who was ten years older than he was. Charlotte had been committed by her mother before their marriage. James and Charlotte had a daughter named Harriett Charlotte. Towards the end of his life Hurdis lived at Carlton Crescent in Southampton, where he died on 30 November 1857. There is a notable memorial to him, his wife and brother, and other members of the Hurdis family in Southampton Old Cemetery.

Hurdis's younger brother, John Lewis, was Controller of Customs in Bermuda.
