= Mark Antony Lower =

British antiquarian (1813–1876)

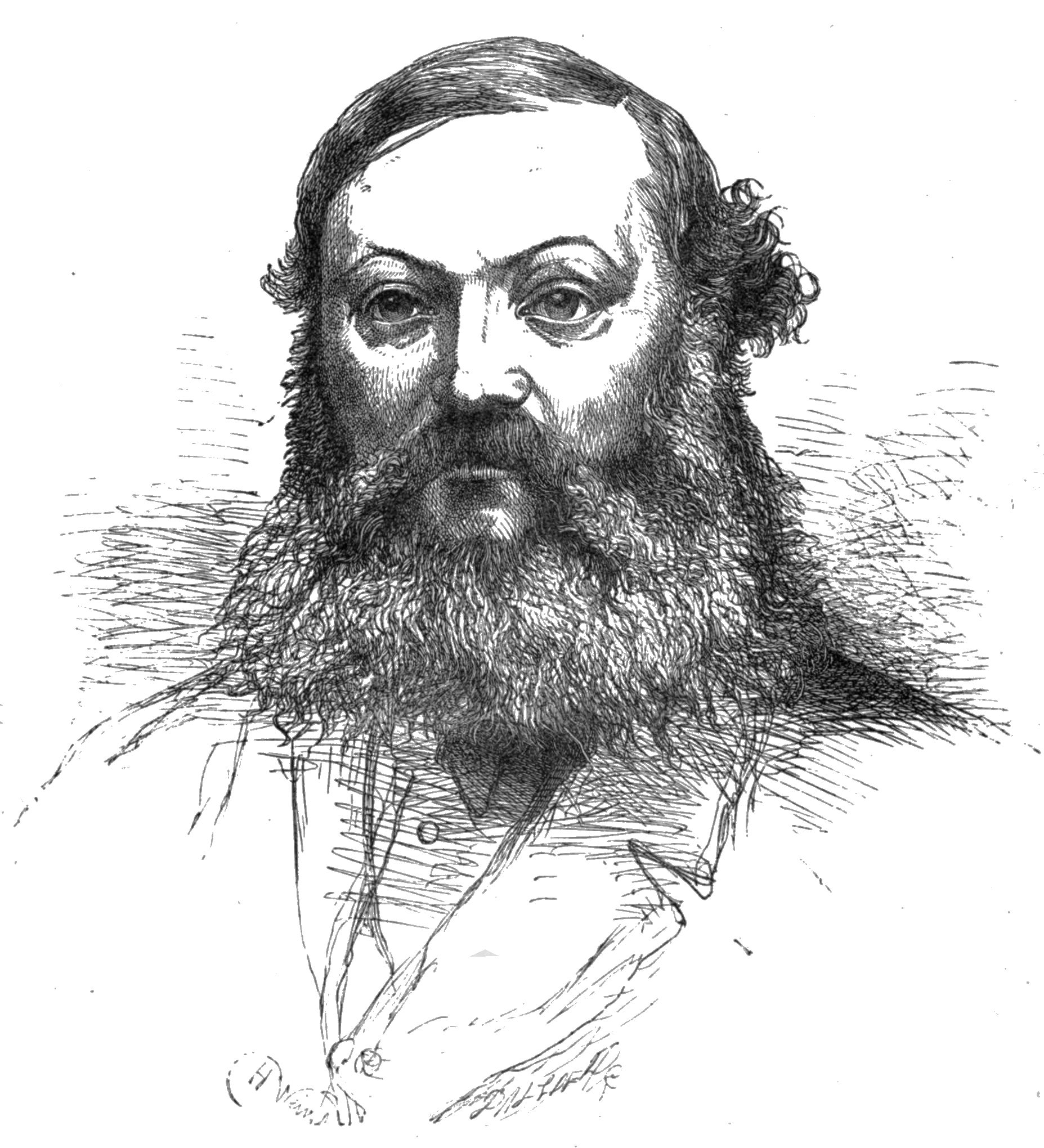
Mark Antony Lower

Mark Antony Lower F.S.A. M.A. (14 July 1813 – 22 March 1876) was a Sussex historian and schoolteacher who founded the Sussex Archaeological Society. An anti-Catholic propagandist, Lower is believed to have started the "cult of the Sussex Martyrs", although he was against the excesses of the "Bonfire Boys".

== Life ==
Lower was born 14 July 1813, one of six sons of Richard Lower, a schoolmaster, and his wife in Chiddingly. Richard and Mary (née Oxley) gave Lower a good education. It appears he showed an early interest in heraldry as a painted coat of arms in the local church is attributed to him. He worked first at his sister's school in East Hoathly, before further extending the family's interests in local education with a school at Alfriston under his control. Within three years, however, he left to establish another school in Lewes in Sussex in 1835.

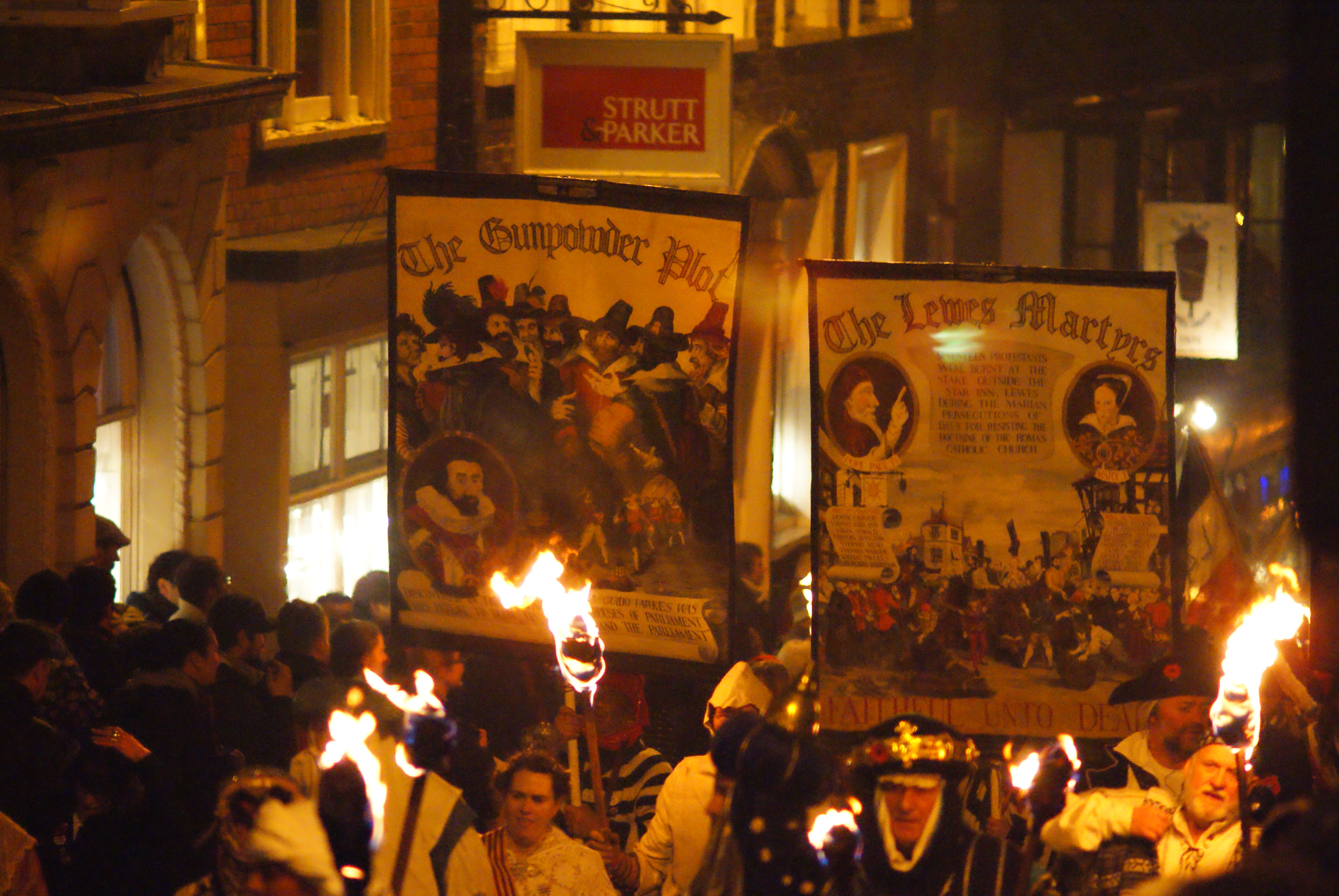
The Sussex Martyrs are still remembered today.

He married Mercy Holman in 1835 when his school had moved to St. Anne's House in Lewes High Street. He was elected a member of the American Antiquarian Society in 1844. His establishment of the Sussex Archaeological Society with J. H. Hurdis in 1846 established Lower as a well-regarded notable antiquarian. His publication of The Sussex Martyrs, their Examinations and Cruel Burnings in the time of Queen Mary... in 1851 together with an etching by James Henry Hurdis of Richard Woodman and nine other martyrs is credited with establishing the "cult of the Sussex Martyrs". However, it is noted that his Sussex Martyrs was really a re-publication of John Foxe's account in his Book of Martyrs. Although Lower is credited with publicising the Sussex Martyrs, he does not appear to have started the Bonfire Societies. His biography credits him with writing a note complaining of the excesses of the "Bonfire Boys", and he had himself been an active member of the Lewes New Temperance Society.

Lower said that he had published the Sussex Martyrs because their deaths had been largely forgotten and high churchmen were referring to the Reformation and the deaths of these people as a mistake. Following the publications "anti-popish" demonstrations took place each year around 5 November. In 1868 a figure dressed as the "Bishop of Lewes" warned protestants of the Roman Catholic threat and the following year an effigy of the pope was to be blown up with gunpowder.

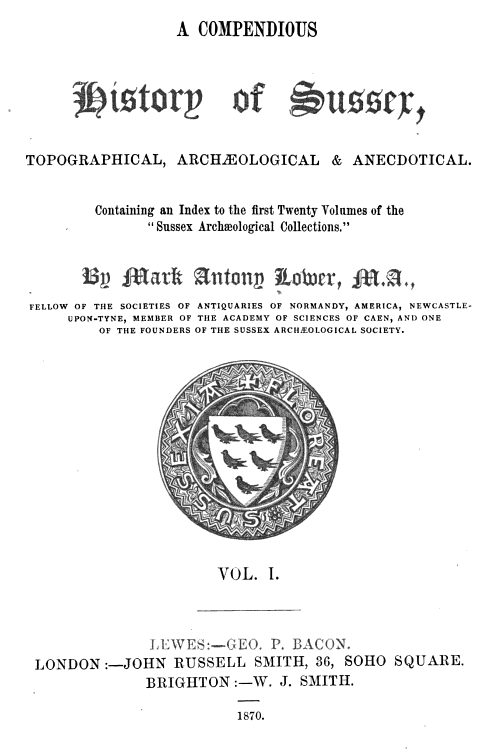
Title page, A Compendious History of Sussex, Mark Antony Lower, 1870

Lower published numerous articles for the Sussex Archaeological Society and he was employed for a number of years as a secretary. He published Patronymica Britannica: A Dictionary of the Family Names of the United Kingdom in 1860 and The Worthies of Sussex in 1865. Mercy Lower died in 1867. The widower married Sarah Scrase three years later after moving to Seaford. His important Sussex local history book, A Compendious History of Sussex, was completed just a year before he left Lewes for London. His guide to Scandinavia was published in 1874 after he toured there to improve his health.

Lower died on 22 March 1876 in Enfield. He was buried in St Anne's Church in Lewes.

== Works ==
- English surnames, 1842
- The Curiosities of Heraldry, 1845
- Chronicles of Pevensey, 1846
- Sussex Archaeological Society, various publications, 1846–
- The Sussex Martyrs, their Examinations and Cruel Burnings in the time of Queen Mary, comprising the interesting personal narrative of Richard Woodman, &c. &c., 1852
- Patronymica Britannica, 1860 (A dictionary of the family names of the United Kingdom)
- The Song of Solomon in the dialect of Sussex; from the authorised English version, 1860
- Old Speech and Old Manners in Sussex, 1861
- Parochial history of Chiddingly, 1862
- The Worthies of Sussex, 1865
- A Compendious History of Sussex,1870
- Historical and genealogical notices of the Pelham family, 1873
- The Chronicle of Battel [sic] Abbey, 1851
