= Francis William Steer =

Francis William Steer FSA, FRHistS
- Born: 10 August 1912; Ashingdon, England
- Died: 23 September 1978 (aged 66); Chichester, England
- Occupations: Antiquarian, archivist and herald
- Writing career
- Language: English

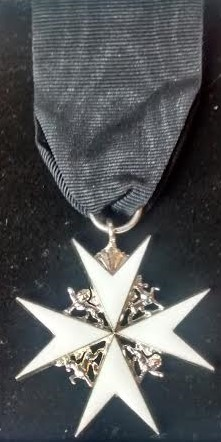
OStJ insignia

Francis William Steer, FSA, FRHistS (10 August 1912 – 23 September 1978), was an English antiquarian, archivist, and herald.

From 1953 Steer was archivist and librarian to the Bishop, Dean and Chapter of Chichester. In 1956, he became archivist and librarian to the Duke of Norfolk at Arundel. Though he had never attended university, in 1959 Steer was awarded a Lambeth degree by Archbishop Geoffrey Fisher in recognition of his work, and subsequently received both an MA (by resolution) from the University of Oxford in 1974 and an honorary doctorate from the University of Sussex in 1978. The 16th Duke of Norfolk, as Earl Marshal, appointed him Maltravers Herald Extraordinary in 1972. Admitted to the freedom of the City of London, Steer was a liveryman of the Worshipful Company of Scriveners. In 1967, he was appointed an OStJ.

Among Steer's many publications is the catalogue of the archives of New College, Oxford, where he became Archivist in 1965. A memorial plaque in New College recognises Steer's contribution to the college.

An oil painting of him by Audrey Jennings can be seen in West Sussex Record Office.

== See also ==
- Society of Antiquaries of London
- Royal Historical Society
