= Lewes Castle =

Castle in East Sussex, England

- Lewes, East Sussex
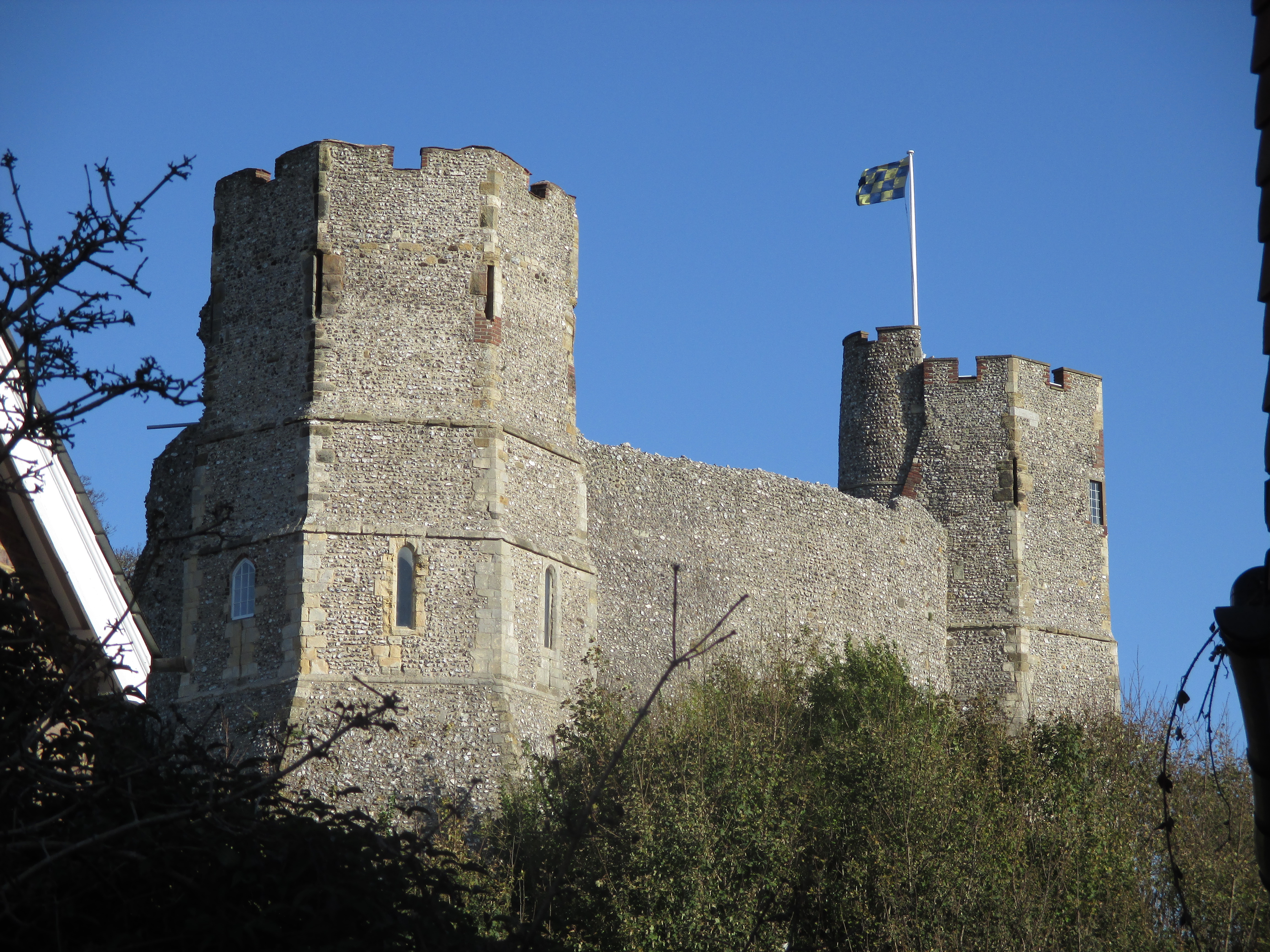
- Two towers of Lewes Castle, East Sussex, photographed from the west

Site information
- Type: Norman
- Open to the public: Yes

Location
- Shown within East Sussex
- Coordinates: 50°52′22″N 0°00′27″E

Site history
- Built: late 11th century
- Built by: William de Warenne, 1st Earl of Surrey
- Materials: Stone

Scheduled monument
- Official name: Lewes Castle
- Designated: 28 August 1915
- Reference no.: 1013268

Lewes Castle is a medieval castle in the town of Lewes in East Sussex, England. Originally called Bray Castle, it occupies a commanding position guarding the gap in the South Downs cut by the River Ouse and occupied by the towns of Lewes and Cliffe. It stands on a man-made mount just to the north of the high street in Lewes, and is constructed from local limestone and flint blocks.

== History ==
Early Norman castle gate (11th c.)

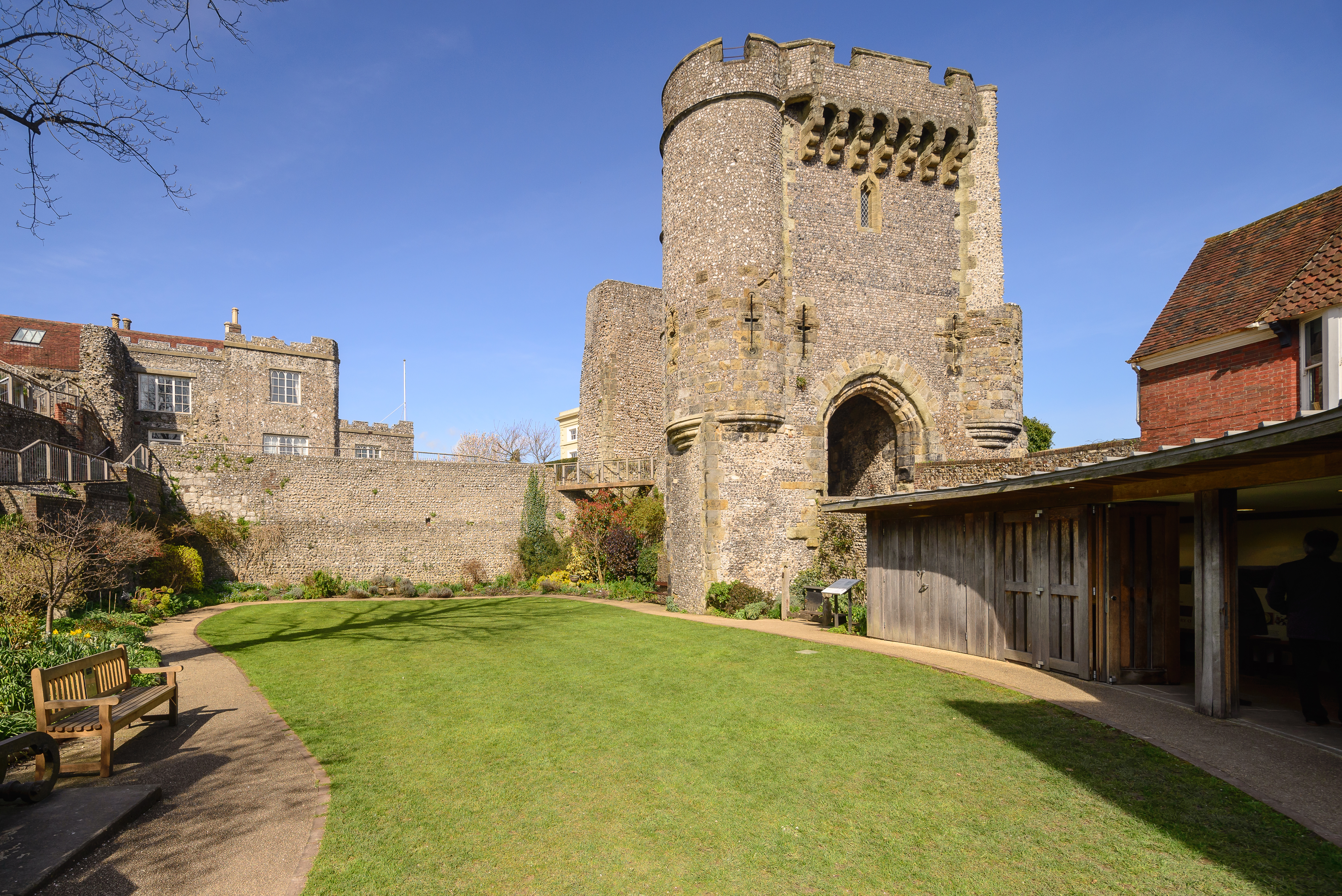
The barbican gate (14th c.)

The castle follows a motte and bailey design but, unusually, it has two mottes, and the only other castle in England to have that structure is Lincoln Castle.

The first motte, known as Brack Mount, was completed shortly after the Norman Conquest of England in 1066 and the second motte, known as the Keep, was completed in the late 11th century. Both mottes were built by William de Warenne, 1st Earl of Surrey. The mottes would originally have been surmounted by wooden palisades but these were replaced with masonry shell keeps at the start of the 12th century. The bailey area also had a stone wall with towers.

Soldiers left the castle to engage with Simon de Montfort at the Battle of Lewes in 1264.

Towers were added to one of the shell keeps in the 13th century and a barbican gate was added in front of the older Norman gate in the 14th century. When the last of the de Warennes, John, the 7th Earl, died without issue in 1347, he was buried in Lewes Priory. His title passed to his nephew Richard FitzAlan, 10th Earl of Arundel.

The castle was leased by Sussex Archaeological Society from 1850, and was acquired by Charles Thomas-Stanford and gifted to the Sussex Archaeological Society in 1922.

=== Wall collapse ===
On 11 November 2019 at 12:22 GMT the first alert was raised that a 10m by 10m section of the curtain wall had collapsed onto an adjacent house and garden. Emergency services searched the site but found no casualties. Sussex Archaeological Society said that the collapsed wall was privately owned and one of the last parts of the curtain wall. They also said that the parts owned by the society were checked independently on an annual basis. The castle was closed as a precaution. The wall was described in a contemporaneous news report as weighing 600 tonnes.

== See also ==
- Battle of Lewes
