= Alciston =

Village and parish in East Sussex, England

Coordinates: 50.83°N 00.14°E

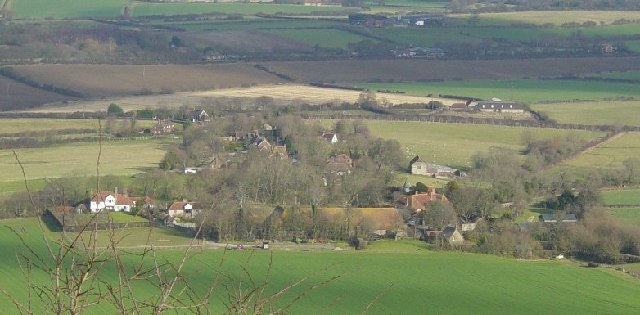
- Alciston from Bostal Hill

- Location within East Sussex
- Area: 7.0 km^{2} (2.7 sq mi)
- Population: 146 (2007-Parish)
  - Density: 44/sq mi (17/km^{2})
- OS grid reference: TQ506055
  - London: 48 miles (77 km) NNW
- District: Wealden
- Shire county: East Sussex
- Region: South East
- Country: England
- Sovereign state: United Kingdom
- Post town: POLEGATE
- Postcode district: BN26
- Dialling code: 01323
- Police: Sussex
- Fire: East Sussex
- Ambulance: South East Coast
- UK Parliament: Lewes

Alciston is a village and civil parish in the Wealden district of East Sussex, England. It is inland, just off the A27 road, about ten miles (16 km) north-west of Eastbourne and seven miles (11 km) east of Lewes. The ecclesiastical parish is linked with that of Selmeston and Berwick.

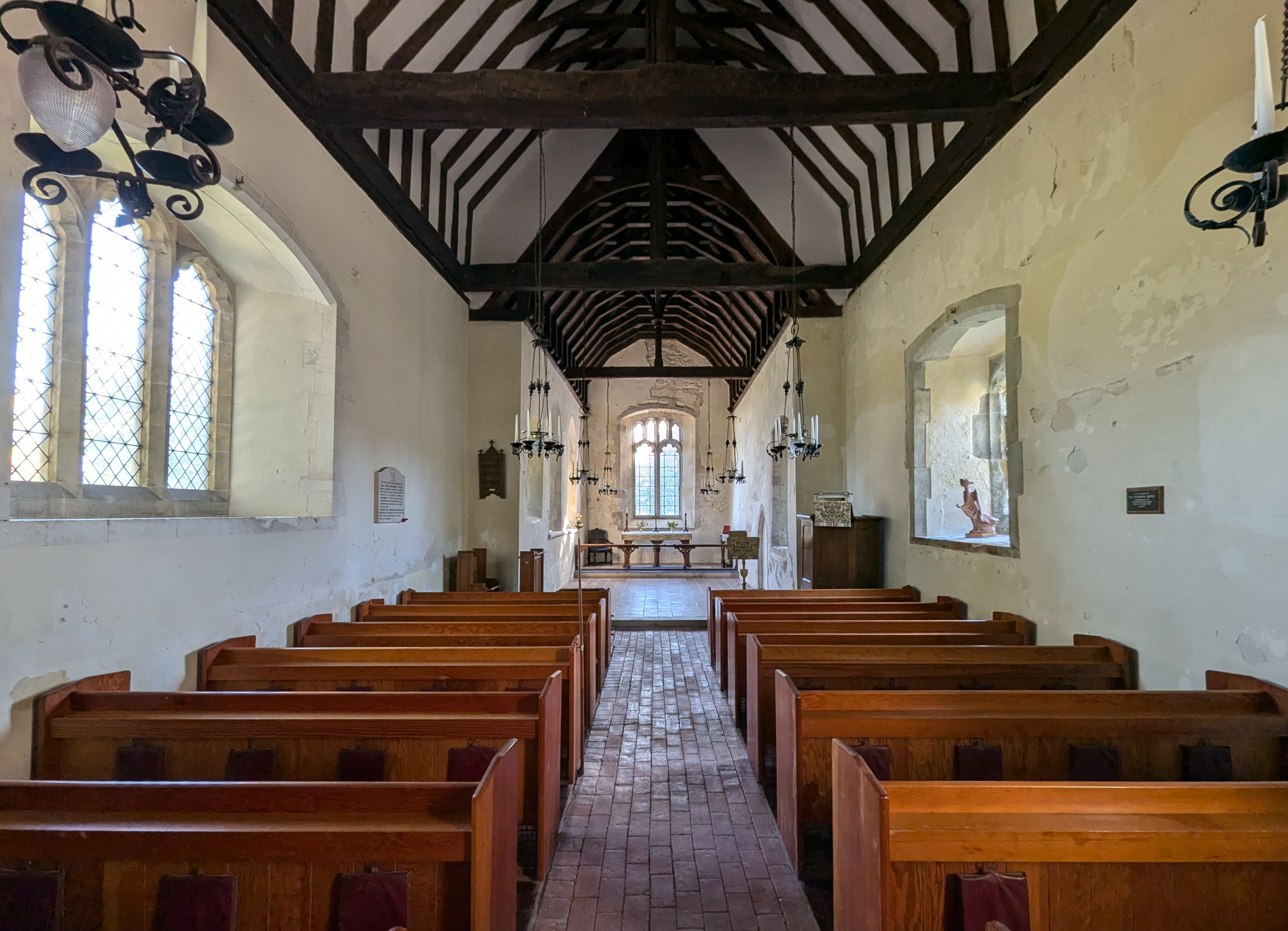
The nave of Alciston Church, Alciston, East Sussex, England. September 2024.

Saxon in origin, its name was then Aelfsige.

== History ==
The village (Alcistone) is mentioned in the Domesday Book of 1086, when it was a significant settlement with 70 villagers, 8 smallholders, 12 slaves and 7 burgesses; there were 50 acres of meadows, six of pasture and four of woodland for pigs.

== Church ==
The present 14th-century church, of unknown dedication, is built of chalk from the nearby South Downs.

== Notable buildings, events and people ==
There is a large medieval tithe barn in the village which is 170 feet (52 m) long and is the largest in Sussex. There is also the ruin of a square shaped dovecote built by monks in the 14th century, who used Alciston as a grange of Battle Abbey.

Every Good Friday, the road outside the Rose Cottage Inn is closed for the villagers to take part in a traditional skipping contest.

The historian C.V. Wedgwood is buried in the church graveyard.

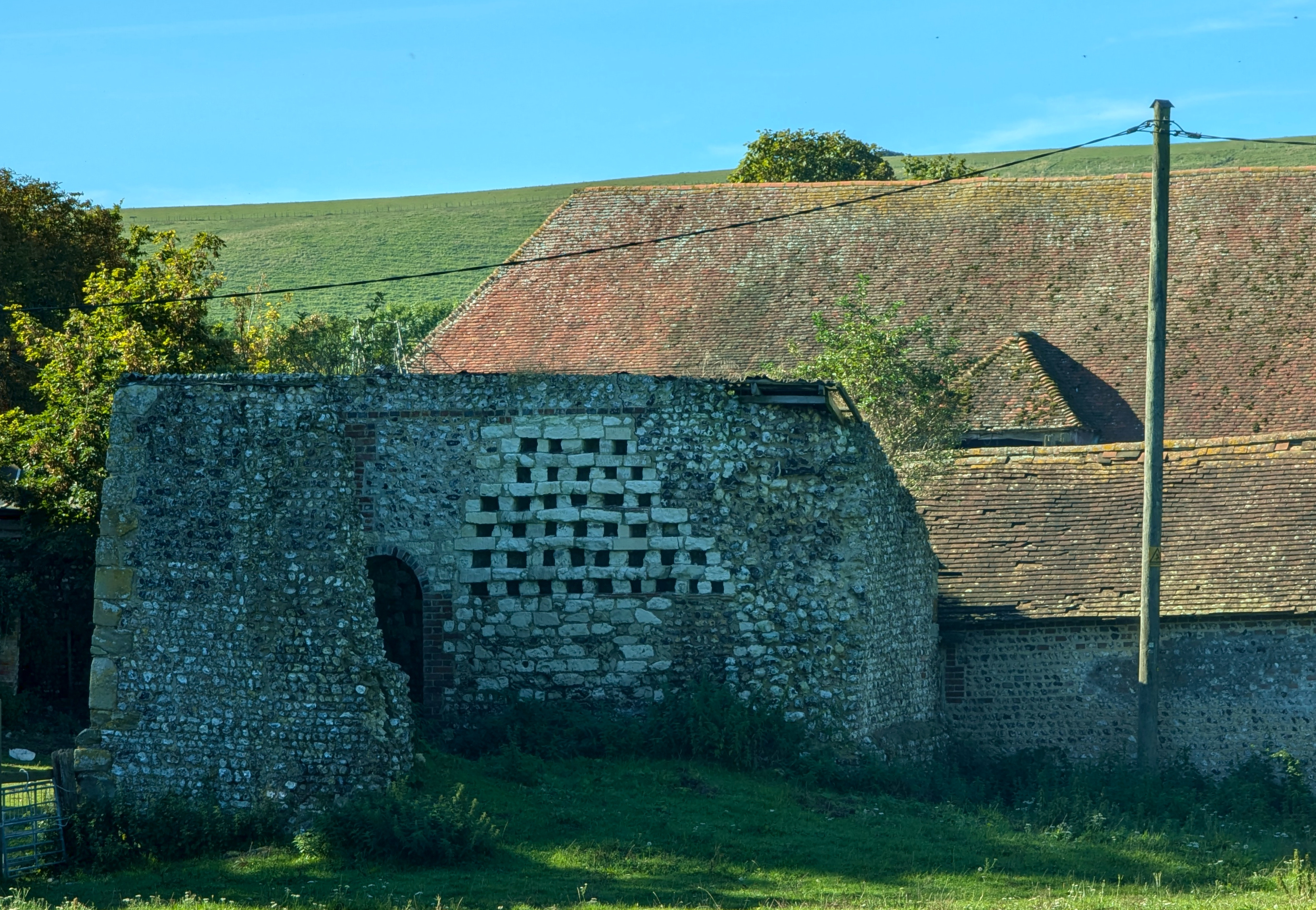
The ruins of a square Dovecote at Alciston, East Sussex, England. September 2024.

== Governance ==
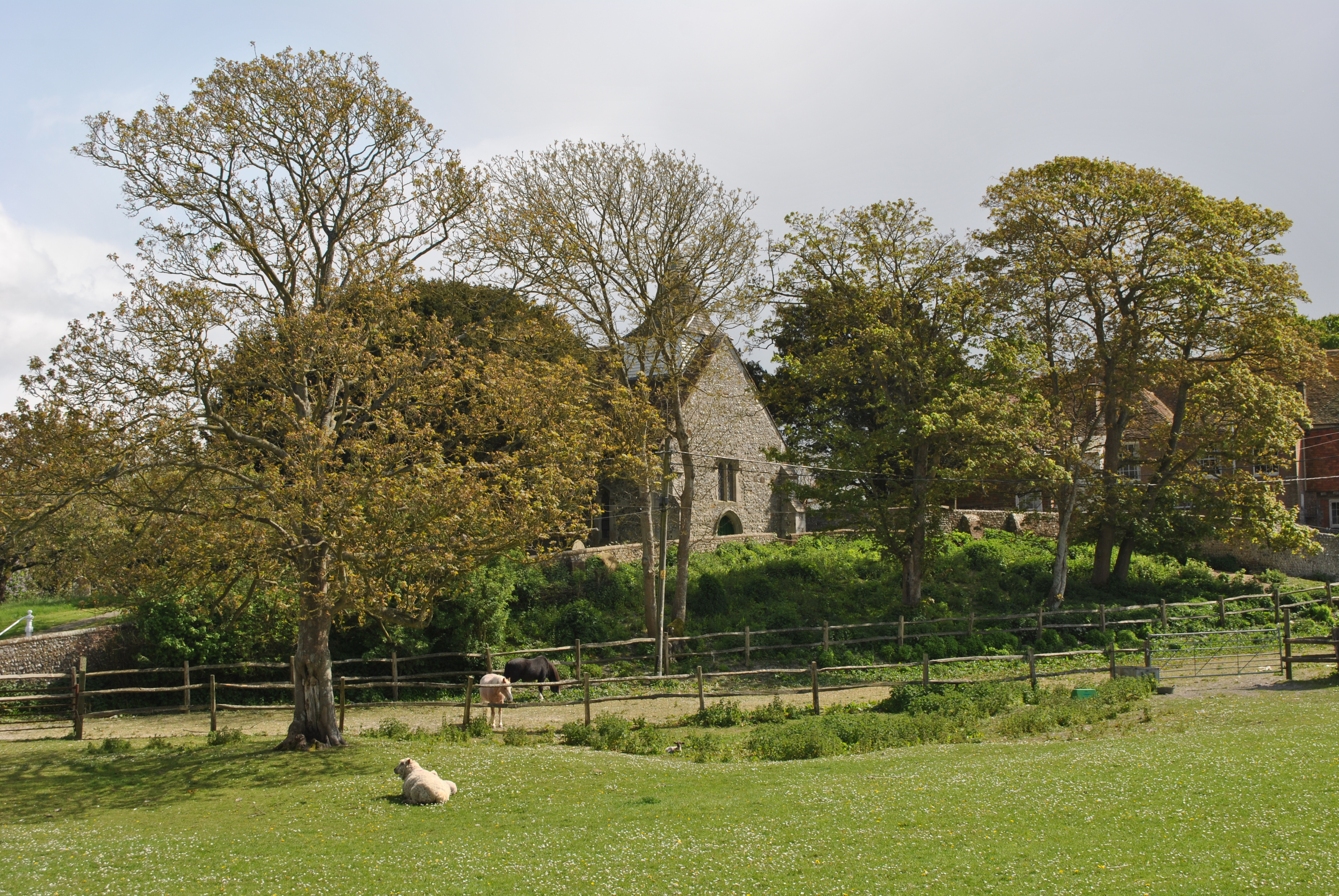
Alciston Parish Church, 2017

The lowest tier of government for Alciston is a parish meeting. Instead of voting for representatives, a small parish may hold a community meeting twice a year to which all the electors may attend and vote on issues.

Wealden District Council is the next tier of government, for which Alciston is part of the Alfriston ward, along with Alfriston, Berwick, Chalvington & Ripe and Selmeston. The ward returns one councillor, who was David Watts in the 2019 election.

Alciston is represented at the East Sussex County Council as part of the East Hoathly & Hellingly Division. The May 2017 election returned the Conservative councillor Nick Bennett.

The parliamentary constituency for Alciston is Lewes. The general election in July 2024 returned Liberal Democrat James McCleary as MP.

Prior to Brexit in 2020, Alciston was part of the South East England constituency in the European Parliament.
