= Sussex Archaeological Society =

- Abbreviation: SAS
- Formation: 18 June 1846; 180 years ago
- Founder: Mark Antony Lower, William Henry Blaauw and William Figg
- Founded at: Lewes, England
- Type: Archaeological society
- Legal status: Active
- Purpose: Researching and preserving the history and archaeology of East and West Sussex
- Headquarters: Lewes, England
- Location: Lewes, England
- Coordinates: 50.87889°N 0.01028°E
- Region served: East Sussex and West Sussex
- Services: Archaeological excavations, talks, conferences, research facilities at its library
- Fields: Archaeology, History
- Official language: English
- Secretary General: Andrew Edwards (Chief Executive)
- Chief Executive: Andrew Edwards
- Main organ: Sussex Archaeological Collections (journal)
- Funding: National Lottery Heritage Fund, British government's Culture Recovery Fund
- Website: https://sussexpast.co.uk/

The Sussex Archaeological Society is an organisation dedicated to researching and preserving the history and archaeology of the English counties of East Sussex and West Sussex. It manages six historic sites, including Lewes Castle and Fishbourne Roman Palace.

== History ==
The discovery in 1845 of the remains of Lewes Priory during the construction of the Brighton, Lewes and Hastings Railway sparked interest in the county's history and led to the formation of an archaeological society. On 18 June 1846, a meeting was convened by Mark Antony Lower, William Henry Blaauw, and William Figg at County Hall in Lewes, where the Sussex Archaeological Society was formally established.

In 1864, the Society appointed its first curator and librarian, and in 1866, the first museum catalogue was compiled. After initially renting space in Castle Lodge, the Society later acquired Barbican House, which continues to house its museum and library.

== Activities ==
The Sussex Archaeological Society organises excavations, talks and conferences on the archaeology and history of Sussex and offers research facilities at its library. Its chief executive is currently Andrew Edwards.

As well as supervising excavations in Sussex, it also publishes the Sussex Archaeological Collections and an annual report, and administers the Long Man of Wilmington. It manages six historic properties and museums, which are open to the public:

- Fishbourne Roman Palace
- Lewes Castle and Barbican House Museum
- Anne of Cleves House, Lewes
- Michelham Priory
- Marlipins Museum, Shoreham-By-Sea
- The Priest House, West Hoathly

In 2006 the Society began an archeological investigation in the Tide Mills area, which, according to the Newhaven Local & Maritime Museum, would include not only the tide mill but also a record of the entire East Beach site, comprising the mills, railway station, nurses home, Chailey Heritage Marine Hospital, Newhaven Seaplane Base, holiday homes and the Newhaven Marconi Radio Station.

In 2020 the society received a £250,000 grant from the National Lottery Heritage Fund to cover costs during the Covid-19 pandemic. It also received £323,800 from the British government's Culture Recovery Fund in 2021.

== Notable members ==
- William Henry Blaauw, antiquarian and historian
- George Slade Butler, lawyer and antiquarian
- Garth Christian, journalist and writer
- John George Dodson, politician
- Peter Ladson Drewett, archaeologist and author
- Walter Hindes Godfrey, architect and historian
- Henry Andrade Harben, barrister and politician
- James Henry Hurdis, artist
- Philip Mainwaring Johnston, architect and historian
- Mark Antony Lower, historian and teacher
- John Manley, archaeologist and author
- Katherine Maud Elizabeth Murray, biographer and educationalist
- Rev. Frederick Spurrell, clergyman and archaeologist
- Mark Aloysius Tierney, historian
- Rev. Charles Watts Whistler, clergyman and writer
- Lewis Pinhorn Wood, artist

== Publications ==
The Society has published an official journal, Sussex Archaeological Collections, annually since 1848 with a few gaps. The current editor is Jaime Kaminski.
