= John Manley (archaeologist) =

British archaeologist and author (born 1950)

John Manley (born 1950) is a British archaeologist and author. His book AD 43, published by Tempus in 2002, is the first to give serious consideration to the archaeological evidence for the Roman invasion of Britain having taken place via alternative routes (as opposed to the traditional view of Richborough in Kent as the main landing-place).

Manley was educated at the universities of Manchester and Sussex, and has excavated throughout Europe, as well as in the Near East, Africa and the Caribbean. He was formerly County Archaeologist of Clwyd and Chief Executive of the Sussex Archaeological Society. He is currently an Hon. Research Fellow and a Trustee of the Sussex Archaeological Society.

== Publications ==
- Atlas of Prehistoric Britain, Phaidon, 1989 ISBN 0714825697
- The Archaeology of Clwyd, with Stephen Grenter and Fiona Gale, Clwyd County Council, 1991 ISBN 9780904449426
- The Atlas of Past Worlds: a comparative chronology of human history 2000 BC – AD 1500, Cassell, 1993 ISBN 0304319813
- AD 43: The Roman Invasion of Britain: a reassessment, Tempus, 2002 ISBN 0752419595
- Facing the Palace: excavations in front of the Roman Palace at Fishbourne, 1995–99, with David Rudkin, Lewes, 2005
- The Archaeology of Fishbourne and Chichester: a framework for its future, Lewes, 2008 ISBN 9780904973082
- The Archaeology of the South Downs National Park: An Introduction, Lewes, 2012 ISBN 9780904973228
- South Downs: Archaeological Walking Guides, History Press, 2013 ISBN 9780752466088
- The Romans, Hodder, 2013 ISBN 9781444183887
- Archaeology, Hodder, 2014 ISBN 9781471805639
- Secrets of the High Woods: revealing hidden landscapes (editor), South Downs National Park Authority, 2016 ISBN 9781527203020
