= Lewes avalanche =

Deadliest known avalanche in the United Kingdom

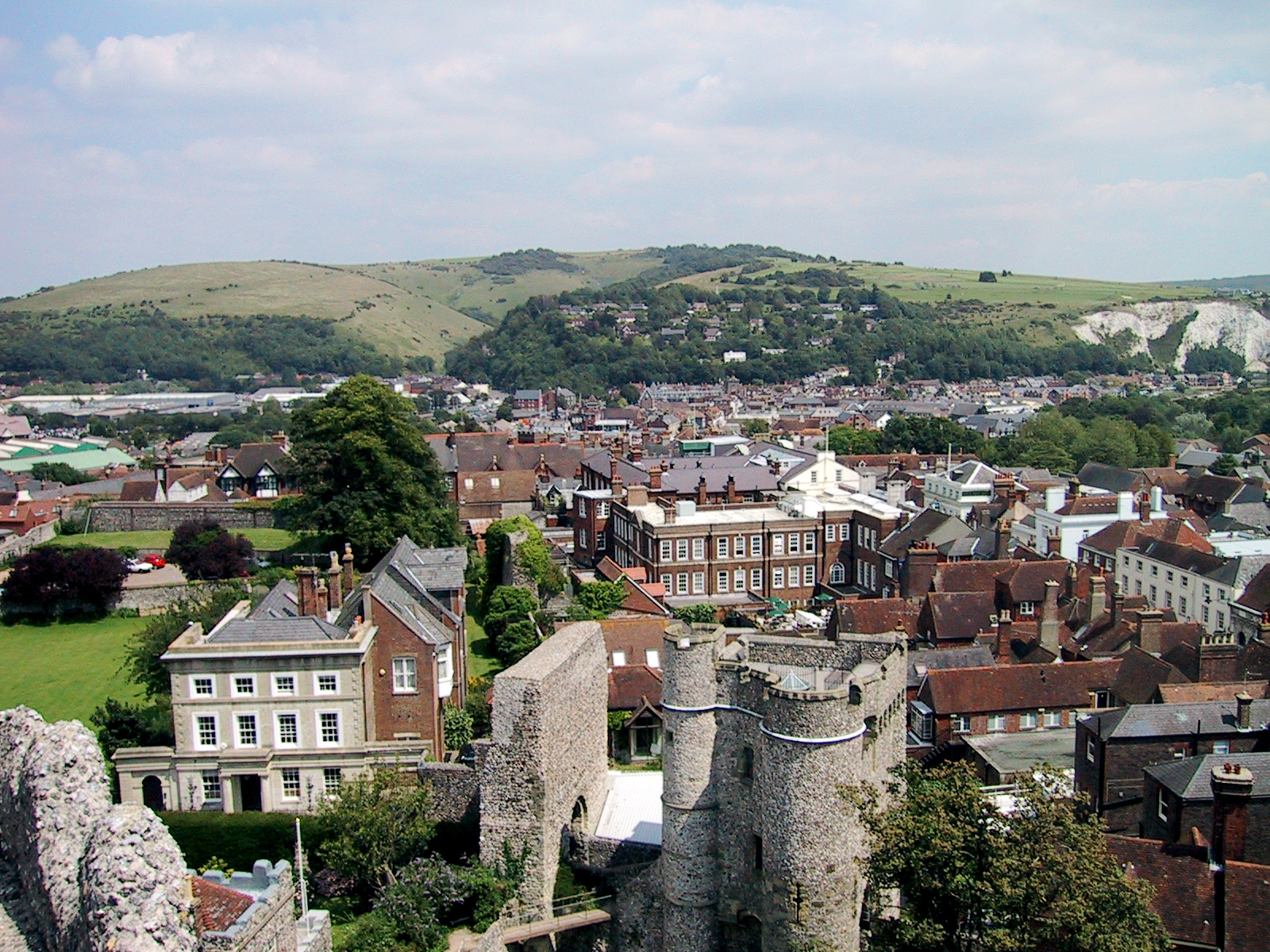
- Overview of Lewes in 2008; the avalanche started on the white chalk cliffs to the right
- Date: 27 December 1836
- Time: 10:15 GMT (UTC)
- Location: Lewes, East Sussex, United Kingdom; 50°52′20″N 0°01′22″E
- Cause: Heavy snowfall
- Deaths: 8
- Property damage: Seven homes destroyed on South Street
- Deadliest avalanche ever recorded in the United Kingdom

The Lewes avalanche occurred on 27 December 1836 in Lewes, East Sussex, when a huge build-up of snow on a chalk cliff overlooking the town collapsed into the settlement 100 metres (330 ft) below, destroying a row of cottages and killing eight people. It remains the deadliest avalanche on record in the United Kingdom.

== Background ==
The town of Lewes is about seven miles (eleven kilometres) north of the Sussex coast, on the River Ouse in a gap in the South Downs. Hills rise above Lewes to the east and west, with Cliffe Hill to the east rising to 164 metres (538 ft) above sea level. The hill has a precipitously sloping western edge which dominates the eastern panorama from the town. In 1836, a row of seven flimsily constructed workers' cottages called Boulder Row, on South Street, stood immediately at the foot of Cliffe Hill. The total number of inhabitants of Boulder Row is unknown, but contemporary reports indicated that fifteen people were in the cottages when the avalanche struck.

== December 1836 ==
The winter of 1836–1837 was exceptionally severe across the whole of Great Britain, with heavy snow, gale-force winds and freezing temperatures being recorded in locations all around the country from the end of October 1836 through to April 1837. Very heavy snowfall began across South East England, and in particular over the South Downs, on 24 December 1836, and continued unabated over the Christmas period. Strong winds at the same time created blizzard conditions, with reports of snowdrifts over ten feet (3 m) high in some areas of Lewes. Unknown to the inhabitants of the town, the accumulation of snow at the top of Cliffe Hill, driven by a particularly severe gale on Christmas night, had been forming into a large cornice overhanging its almost sheer western edge. On the evening preceding the disaster, a significant build-up of snow was observed falling from the top of the hill into a timber yard close to Boulder Row. The inhabitants were warned that they could be at risk and were advised to leave their homes until the danger had passed, but for their own reasons they chose to ignore the warning.

At 10:15 on the morning of Tuesday 27 December the cornice collapsed more extensively, producing an enormous avalanche of accumulated snow directly onto Boulder Row. The Sussex Weekly Advertiser, reporting the testimony of eyewitnesses, stated: "The mass appeared to strike the houses first at the base, heaving them upwards, and then breaking over them like a gigantic wave. There was nothing but a mound of pure white." A rescue operation by townspeople succeeded in pulling seven survivors from the wreckage before hypothermia or suffocation could claim them, but eight other individuals were found dead. Their names are recorded on a commemorative tablet on the inside wall of South Malling parish church, one mile (1.5 kilometres) away, where the funeral and burial took place. The fatalities included people with the family names Barnden, Bridgman and Geer, while survivors included a young labourer Jeremiah Rooke, a middle-aged woman named Fanny Sherlock (or Sharlock) and a two-year-old child, Fanny Boakes, believed to be Sherlock's granddaughter (the 1841 census records two people matching these names and ages living at the same address in South Street). In the aftermath of the tragedy, a fund was set up by prominent townspeople to provide financial assistance to the survivors and families of the deceased.

== Legacy ==

The Snowdrop Inn is a public house named in commemoration of the incident in 1840. It was built in South Street on the site once occupied by Boulder Row, and still trades under the same name today.

The white dress being worn by Fanny Boakes when she was rescued was preserved and is now in the Anne of Cleves House museum in Lewes.
