= Lewes =

County town of East Sussex, England

Coordinates: 50°52′29″N 00°00′42″E

- Town
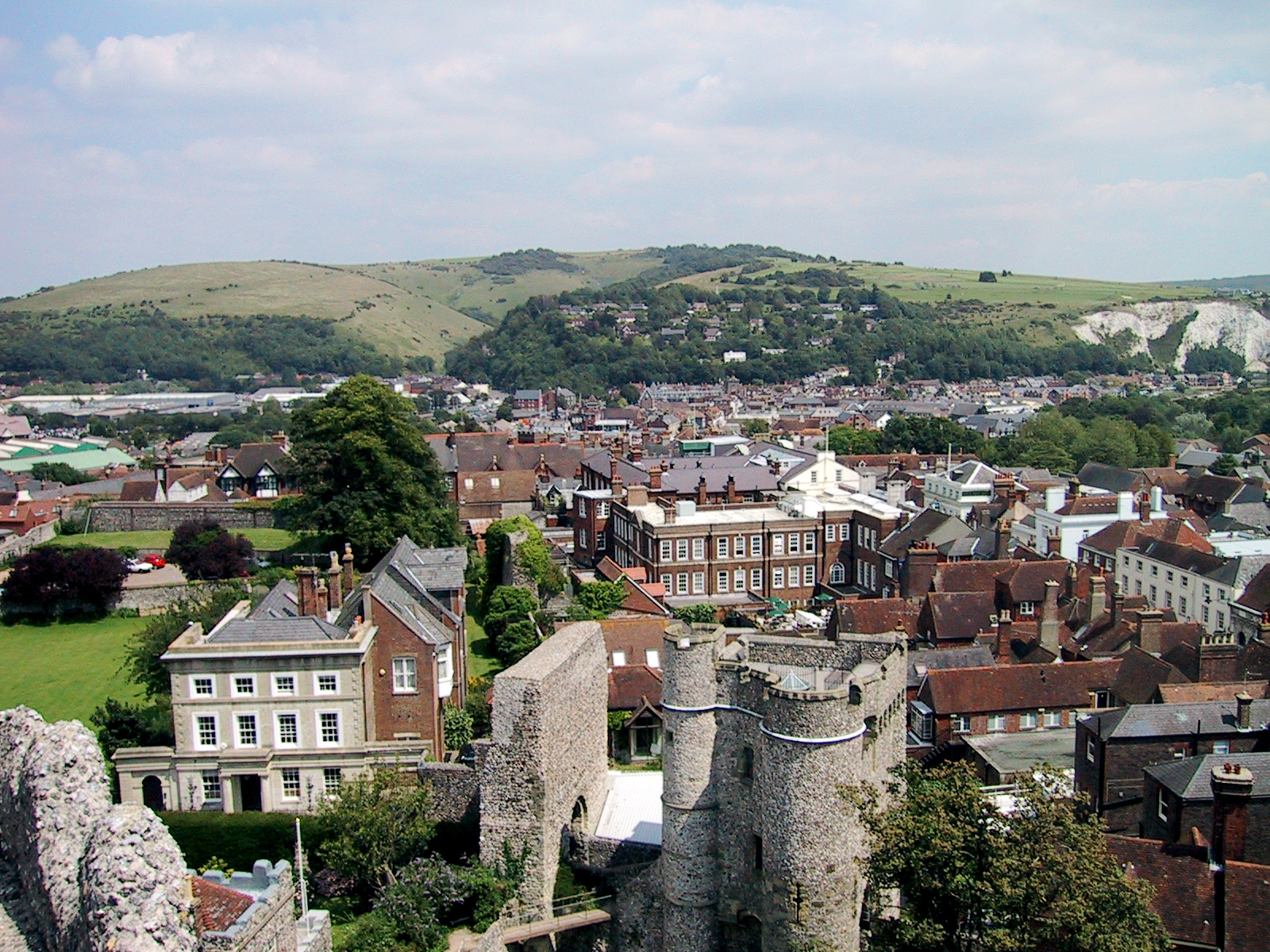
- Lewes viewed from Lewes Castle

- Coat of arms of Lewes

- Location within East Sussex
- Area: 11.4 km^{2} (4.4 sq mi)
- Population: 16,723 (2021 Census)
  - Density: 1,420/km^{2} (3,700/sq mi)
- Demonym: Lewesian
- OS grid reference: TQ420104
  - London: 71 km (44 mi) N
- Civil parish: Lewes
- District: Lewes
- Shire county: East Sussex
- Region: South East
- Country: England
- Sovereign state: United Kingdom
- Post town: LEWES
- Postcode district: BN7
- Dialling code: 01273
- Police: Sussex
- Fire: East Sussex
- Ambulance: South East Coast
- UK Parliament: Lewes
- Website: lewes-tc.gov.uk

Lewes (/ˈluːɪs/) is the county town of East Sussex, England. (Note: Chichester was traditionally described as the capital city of Sussex and Lewes its county town. Horsham was occasionally described as the county town of Sussex due to the presence of the county gaol and the periodic holding of the county assizes and quarter sessions in the town. The last assizes were held there in 1830, while the gaol was closed in 1845.) The town is the administrative centre of the wider district of the same name. and lies on the River Ouse at the point where the river cuts through the South Downs. Lewes is approximately 7 miles (11 km) northeast of Brighton, 11 miles (18 km) northwest of Eastbourne, and 25 miles (40 km) west of Hastings. At the 2021 census, the parish had a population of 16,723.

A traditional market town and centre of communications, in 1264 it was the site of the Battle of Lewes. The town's landmarks include Lewes Castle, Lewes Priory, Bull House (the former home of Thomas Paine), Southover Grange and public gardens, and a 16th-century timber-framed Wealden hall house known as Anne of Cleves House. Other notable features of the area include the Glyndebourne festival, the Lewes Bonfire celebrations and the Lewes Pound.

== Etymology ==
The place-name "Lewes" is first attested in an Anglo-Saxon charter circa 961 AD, where it appears as Læwe. It appears as Lewes in the Domesday Book of 1086. The addition of the <-s> suffix seems to have been part of a broader trend of Anglo-Norman scribes pluralising Anglo-Saxon place-names (a famous example being their rendering of Lunden as Londres, hence the modern French name for London).

The traditional derivation of Læwe, first posited by the Tudor antiquarian Laurence Nowell, derives it from the Old English word hlæw, meaning "hill" or "barrow", presumably referring to School Hill (on which the historic centre of Lewes stands) or to one of the five ancient burial mounds, all now levelled, in the vicinity of St John sub Castro.

However, this etymology has been challenged by the Swedish philologist Rune Forsberg on the grounds that the loss of the initial ⟨h⟩ in hlæw would be unlikely phonologically in this context. He suggested that the name Læwe instead derives from the rare Old English word lǣw ("wound, incision"), and reflects the fact that from the top of School Hill Lewes overlooks the narrow, steep-sided "gash" where the River Ouse cuts through the line of the South Downs. This theory was endorsed in 2011 by A Dictionary of British Place Names.

A third possibility has been advanced by Richard Coates, who has argued that Læwe derives from lexowia, an Old English word meaning "hillside, slope" (of which there is no shortage in the Lewes area). This unusual word was borrowed into Old English from Old Welsh, the Modern Welsh spelling being llechwedd.

== History ==
=== Pre-Saxon ===
The immense strategic value of the site, which is able to command traffic between the Channel coast and the Sussex interior, was recognised as early as the Iron Age, when a hill-fort was built on Mount Caburn, the steep-sided hill that overlooks the Ouse (and the modern town of Lewes) from the east.

During the Roman period, there was an aristocratic villa at Beddingham, at the foot of Mount Caburn, and there have been several finds of Roman coins and pottery sherds in Lewes itself. The Victorian historian Thomas Walker Horsfield therefore reckoned that there must have been a Roman settlement on the site, and he identified it with the otherwise unlocatable town of Mutuantonis. Another antiquarian, John Elliot, even suggested that central Lewes's distinctive network of twittens was based on the layout of a Roman legionary fortress; however modern historians are rather more cautious about the possibility of a Roman Lewes, as there is as yet no archaeological evidence for a built-up area dating back to the Roman period.

=== Anglo-Saxon and Anglo-Norman ===
Norman gate of Lewes Castle (11th century)

Arms of the de Warenne family

The earliest phase of Anglo-Saxon settlement in Sussex was concentrated between the Rivers Ouse and Cuckmere, and Anglo-Saxon finds begin to appear in Lewes from the sixth century. The town of Lewes was probably founded around this time, and it may have been one of the most important settlements in the Kingdom of Sussex, along with Chichester and Hastings, though the evidence for this early period is very sketchy.

By the ninth century, the Kingdom of Sussex had been annexed to the Kingdom of Wessex, and in 838 Ecgberht, King of Wessex donated the estate of Malling, on the opposite side of the Ouse from Lewes, to the archbishop of Canterbury. As a result, the Parish of Malling became a 'peculiar', which means that the parish was directly subject to the archbishop of Canterbury rather than the bishop of Chichester like every other parish in Sussex. Malling would retain this anomalous status until as late as 1845.

Information about Lewes becomes much more plentiful from the reign of Alfred the Great onward, as it was one of the towns which he fortified as part of the network of burhs he established in response to the Viking raids. The peace and stability brought by Alfred and his successors evidently stimulated economic activity in the area, for in the late Anglo-Saxon period Lewes seems to have been a thriving boom town – during the reign of Alfred's grandson Æthelstan it was assigned two royal moneyers, more than any other mint in Sussex, and according to Domesday Book it generated £26 of revenue for the Crown in 1065, almost twice the amount of any other town in the county, and comprised 127 households.

After the Norman Conquest, William the Conqueror rewarded his retainer William de Warenne by making him Earl of Surrey and granting him the Rape of Lewes, a strip of land stretching along the Ouse valley from the coast to the Surrey boundary. De Warenne constructed Lewes Castle within the walls of the Saxon burh, while his wife Gundreda founded the Priory of St Pancras, a Cluniac monastic house, in about 1081.

=== Battle of Lewes ===
During the Second Barons' War, King Henry III was ambushed at Lewes by a force of rebel barons led by Simon de Montfort. Henry marched out to fight de Montfort, leading to a pitched battle on the hills above the town (roughly in the area of modern Landport Bottom). The king's son Prince Edward, commanding the right wing of the royal army, succeeded in driving off some of the baronial forces, but he got carried away with the pursuit, which took him as far as Offham. In Edward's absence the remainder of the royal army was attacked by de Montfort and Gilbert de Clare and decisively defeated. The king's brother Richard of Cornwall was captured, and the king himself was forced to sign the Mise of Lewes, a document which does not survive but was probably aimed at forcing Henry to uphold the Provisions of Oxford. Despite this uncertainty about its consequences, the battle is often seen as an important milestone in the development of English democracy.

=== Late Mediaeval and Early Modern ===
Arms of the Fitzalan family

The de Warenne family died out with Earl John in 1347, whereupon lordship of the Rape of Lewes passed to his sororal nephew Richard Fitzalan, 4th Earl of Arundel. Fitzalan preferred to reside at Arundel Castle rather than at Lewes, and the town therefore lost the prestige and economic advantages associated with being the seat of an important magnate. This was only the beginning of a series of misfortunes that struck Lewes, for in 1348 the Black Death arrived in England and later on in the century the Hundred Years' War led to a series of French and Castilian raids on Sussex, which badly disrupted trade. On one occasion in 1377 the Prior of St Pancras, John de Charlieu, was abducted by the raiders and held to ransom. Furthermore, after the main branch of the Fitzalan family died out in 1439, the Rape of Lewes was subsequently partitioned between the three sororal nephews of the last earl, namely John Mowbray, 3rd Duke of Norfolk, Edward Neville, 3rd Baron Bergavenny, and Edmund Lenthall. As a result of this dismemberment the district became even more neglected by its lords, although feudal politics was starting to become less important anyway due to the centralising reforms of the Yorkist and Tudor kings.

The English Reformation was begun by one of these Tudor monarchs, Henry VIII, and as part of this process the monasteries of England were dissolved; Lewes Priory was consequently demolished in 1538 and its property seized by the Crown. Henry's daughter Mary I reversed the religious policy of England, and during the resulting Marian Persecutions of 1555–1557, Lewes was the site of the execution of seventeen Protestant martyrs, most of them actually from the Weald rather than Lewes itself, who were burned at the stake in front of the Star Inn (now the site of Lewes Town Hall). Commemoration of the martyrs is one of the main purposes of Lewes Bonfire, and a stone memorial to the martyrs was unveiled on Cliffe Hill in 1901.

Lewesian politics was dominated by a strongly Puritan faction in the reign of Charles I, and during the English Civil War it was one of the most important Parliamentarian strongholds in Sussex. As such it became the target of a royalist attack in December 1642, but the royalist army was intercepted and defeated at the Battle of Muster Green by Parliamentarian forces commanded by Herbert Morley, one of the two members of parliament (MPs) for Lewes.

Lewes recovered relatively quickly after the Civil War, and prospered during the late seventeenth and eighteenth centuries. It had always been one of the principal market towns of Sussex, as well as an important port, and by the end of the Georgian era it also had well-developed textiles, iron, brewing, and shipbuilding industries.

=== Modern ===
The severe winter of 1836–7 led to a large build-up of snow on Cliffe Hill, whose sheer western face directly overlooks the town. On Tuesday 27 December 1836 this snow cornice collapsed, and the resulting Lewes avalanche was the deadliest ever recorded in Britain. The avalanche struck the cottages on Boulters Row (now part of South Street), burying fifteen people, of whom eight died. A pub in South Street is named The Snowdrop in memory of the event.

In 1846, the town became a railway junction, with lines constructed from the north, south and east to two railway stations. The development of Newhaven ended Lewes's period as a major port. During the Crimean War, some 300 Finns who had served in the Russian army during the Åland War and been captured at Bomarsund were imprisoned in the naval prison at Lewes. Lewes became a borough in 1881. Lewes Town Hall opened in 1893 in premises converted from the former Star Inn and in 1913 Council Offices were added in Arts-and-Crafts style.

Lewes Victoria Hospital opened in 1909 in its current premises, as Victoria Hospital and Infirmary, having previously been on School Hill where it opened as the Lewes Dispensary and Infirmary in 1855.

In October 2000, the town suffered major flooding during an intense period of severe weather throughout the United Kingdom. The commercial centre of the town and many residential areas were devastated. In a government report into the nationwide flooding, Lewes was officially noted the most severely affected location. As a result of the devastation, the Lewes Flood Action group formed, to press for better flood protection measures.

== Governance and politics ==
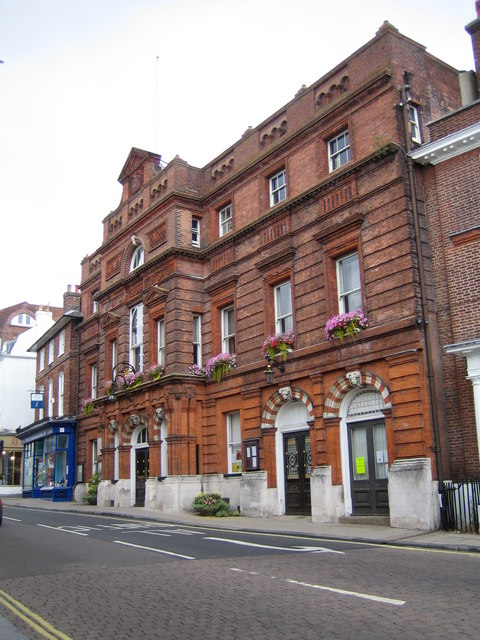
Lewes Town Hall

=== Local government ===
There are three tiers of local government covering Lewes, at parish (town), district and county level: Lewes Town Council, Lewes District Council and East Sussex County Council. The town council is based at Lewes Town Hall on the High Street. The county council has its headquarters at County Hall on St Anne's Crescent in the town, which is also used by Lewes District Council as its meeting place.

Lewes was an ancient borough, although the structure of its early government is obscure. For much of the Middle Ages the town was run by a closed aristocratic organisation known as the "Fellowship of the Twelve", which was gradually eclipsed by a body known as the jury in the seventeenth century, presided over by a constable. The limitations of the town's administration were recognised in 1806 when separate improvement commissioners were established to pave, light and repair the streets and provide a watch. When local government in towns was reformed across the country in the 1830s, Lewes was one of the boroughs left unreformed, and so it continued to be run by its jury and improvement commissioners. The situation was finally regularised in 1881 when the town was made a municipal borough. The town was then run by a corporate body formally called the "mayor, aldermen and burgesses of the borough of Lewes", informally known as the corporation or town council. The last constable became the first mayor.

In 1890, the town council acquired the former Star Inn at 189 High Street, parts of which date back to the fourteenth century, and the adjoining corn exchange. The buildings were converted and extended to become the town hall, including a new frontage to High Street, which was completed in 1893. The municipal borough of Lewes was abolished in 1974 when the larger Lewes District was established. A successor parish was created covering the area of the former borough, with the parish council taking the name Lewes Town Council.

Following the 2023 election the composition of the town council was:

Party	Councillors
Green	12
Liberal Democrats	5
Labour	1
Total	18

The next election is due in 2027.

Since 2010, the town has been included within the South Downs National Park. The National Park Authority has therefore taken over some functions from the local councils, notably relating to town planning.

There are also a number of local political groups without council representation. The far-left group Lewes Maoist Action has operated in the town since 2013, frequently handing out leaflets at the train station and running a cake stall at weekends outside Lewes Castle. In 2020, the group claims to have infiltrated the council and Harvey's brewery, although they have never contested a local or parliamentary election.

=== Constituency ===
Lewes gives its name to the Lewes parliamentary constituency. The constituency was held by the Conservatives from the 1870s until 1997, when it was won by Liberal Democrat Norman Baker. He held the seat for 18 years until defeated in 2015 by Conservative Maria Caulfield, who retained her seat in the 2017 and 2019 general elections. As of July 2024, Liberal Democrat James MacCleary is the MP.

== Geography ==
You can see Lewes lying like a box of toys under a great amphitheatre of chalk hills ... on the whole it is set down better than any town I have seen in England.

— William Morris (1834–1896)

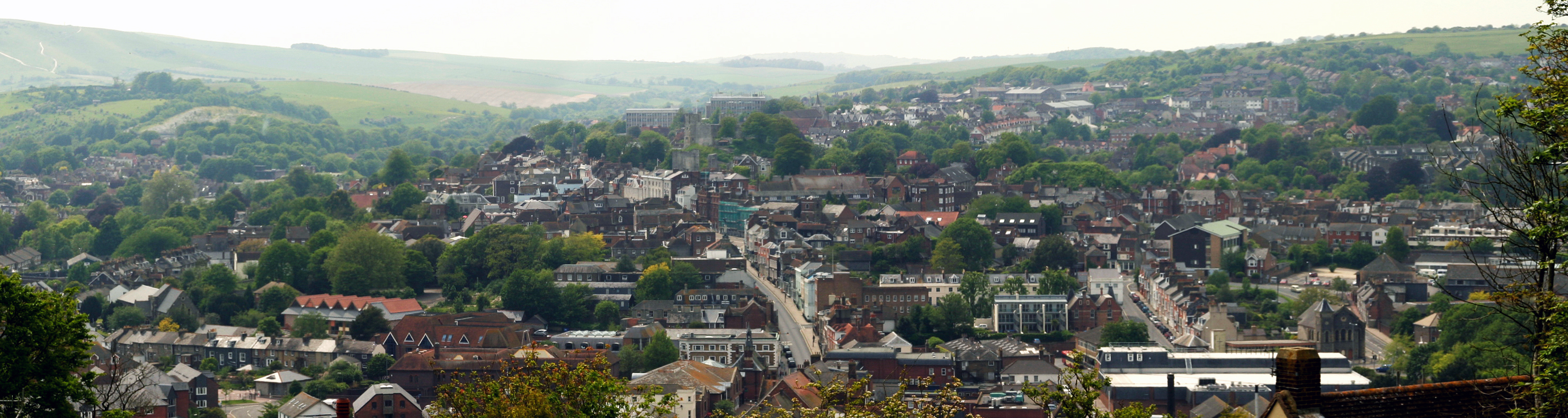
Panoramic view of Lewes

Lewes is situated on the Greenwich or prime meridian, in a gap in the South Downs, cut through by the River Ouse, and near its confluence with the Winterbourne Stream. It is approximately seven miles north of Newhaven, and an equal distance north-east of Brighton.

The South Downs rise above the river on both banks. The High Street, and earliest settlement, occupies the west bank, climbing steeply up from the bridge taking its ancient route along the ridge; the summit on that side, 2.5 miles (4.0 km) distant is known as Mount Harry. On the east bank there is a large chalk cliff, Cliffe Hill that can be seen for many miles, part of the group of hills including Mount Caburn, Malling Down (where there are a few houses in a wooded area on the hillside, in a development known as Cuilfail) and Golf Hill (home to the Lewes Golf Club). The two banks of the river are joined by Willey's Bridge (a footbridge), the Phoenix Causeway (a recent concrete road bridge, named after the old Phoenix Ironworks) and Cliffe Bridge (an 18th-century replacement of the mediaeval crossing, widened in the 1930s and now semi-pedestrianised).

The High Street runs from Eastgate to West-Out, forming the spine of the ancient town. Cliffe Hill gives its name to the one-time village of Cliffe, now part of the town. The southern part of the town, Southover, came into being as a village adjacent to the Priory, south of the Winterbourne Stream. At the north of the town's original wall boundary is the St John's or Pells area, home to several 19th-century streets and the Pells Pond. The Pells Pool, built in 1860, is the oldest freshwater lido in England. The Phoenix Industrial Estate lies along the west bank of the river and contains a number of light industrial and creative industry uses, as well as car parks and a fire station. A potential regeneration project (formerly "The North Street Quarter", renamed "The Phoenix Project" by the Lewes-based eco-development company Human Nature which took on ownership of the land in December 2020) for the area would be the largest in Lewes since the South Malling residential area was developed in the 1950s and 1960s and in the South Downs since it became a National Park.

Malling lies to the east of the river and had 18th- and 19th-century houses and two notable breweries. Road engineering and local planning policy in the 1970s cleared many older buildings here to allow the flow of traffic; the main road route east from the town now goes along Little East Street, across the Phoenix Bridge and through the Cuilfail Tunnel to join the A27.

The town boundaries were enlarged twice (from the original town walls), in 1881 and 1934. They now include the more modern housing estates of Wallands, South Malling (the west part of which is a previously separate village with a church dedicated to St Michael), Nevill, Lansdown and Cranedown on the Kingston Road.

Countryside walks can be taken starting from several points in Lewes. One can walk on Mount Caburn to the village of Glynde starting in Cliffe, traverse the Lewes Brooks (an RSPB reserve) from Southover, walk to Kingston near Lewes also from Southover, head up Landport Bottom to Mount Harry and Black Cap along the edge of the old Lewes Racecourse, or wander up along the Ouse to Hamsey Place from the Pells. The South Downs Way crosses the Ouse just south of Lewes at Southease and hikers often stop off at the town. A new route reaching the town at the Railway Land – the Egrets Way – initially conceived in 2011 by the Ouse Valley Cycle Network, has been designed as a network of walking and cycling paths linking Lewes and Newhaven with the villages in between.

=== Natural sites ===
Three Sites of Special Scientific Interest lie within the parish: Lewes Downs, Lewes Brooks and Southerham Works Pit. Lewes Downs is a site of biological interest, an isolated area of the South Downs. Lewes Brooks, also of biological importance, is part of the floodplain of the River Ouse, providing a habitat for many invertebrates such as water beetles and snails. Southerham Works Pit is of geological interest, a disused chalk pit displaying a wide variety of fossilised fish remains. The Railway Land nature reserve is on the east side of the town next to the Ouse, and contains an area of woodland and marshes, which now includes the Heart of Reeds, a sculpted reed bed designed by local land artist Chris Drury. The Winterbourne stream, a tributary of the Ouse, flows through it. This stream flows most winters and dries up in the summer, hence its name. It continues through Lewes going through the Grange Gardens and often travelling underground. The Heart of Reeds is one of the sites in East Sussex and Kent home to the marsh frog, an introduced species. It is popular with pond-dippers and walkers. A centre for the study of environmental change is due to be built at the entrance to the nature reserve.

On 21 August 1864, Lewes experienced an earthquake measuring 3.1 on the Richter magnitude scale.

=== Climate ===
Climate in this area has mild differences between highs and lows, and there is adequate rainfall year-round. The Köppen Climate Classification subtype for this climate is "Cfb" (Marine West Coast Climate/Oceanic climate).

Climate data for Lewes, UK
Month	Jan	Feb	Mar	Apr	May	Jun	Jul	Aug	Sep	Oct	Nov	Dec	Year
Mean daily maximum °C (°F)	8 (46)	8 (46)	9 (48)	11 (52)	15 (59)	17 (63)	19 (66)	20 (68)	18 (64)	14 (57)	11 (52)	8 (46)	13 (56)
Mean daily minimum °C (°F)	5 (41)	4 (39)	6 (43)	7 (45)	10 (50)	12 (54)	15 (59)	15 (59)	13 (55)	10 (50)	7 (45)	5 (41)	9 (48)
Average precipitation days	12	10	9	7	7	6	8	8	9	10	11	11	108
Source: Weatherbase

== Religious buildings ==
=== Church of England ===
- St Michael's is located at the top of the High Street and like St Peter's in nearby Southease it has a round tower (with a shingled spire). Its length runs along the street rather than away from it and the cemetery is separated from the High Street by stone walls with iron railings on top. Next to it is a building which is used upstairs as a Sunday school.
- Further west is St Anne's, a quiet church surrounded by its graveyard, which gives its name to the street it is on.
- St John sub Castro (Latin for St John-under-the-Castle) is the northernmost church in the old town. The surrounding town quarter is called St John's. The church's boundaries are actually protected on one side by the Town Walls, although originally St John's was a small Saxon building. It was destroyed in the 19th century but the main door was kept and used as an east door for the large new church, built in 1839 by George Cheeseman in flint and brick. In the graveyard there is a memorial to the Finnish prisoners kept in the old naval prison in the 19th century. St John's Church Hall is a couple of streets away in Talbot Terrace.
- In Cliffe there is St Thomas à Becket's, where the Orthodox Community also worship.
- In Southover, St John the Baptist's is located on Southover High Street. The nave incorporates the hospitium of the Priory of St Pancras Neighbouring it is Church End and down the road at St James Street cul-de-sac, the Church Hall. In its grounds is the Southover War Memorial, which is distinct from the main Lewes War Memorial.
- St. Michael, South Malling, dates from 1628.

==== Deconsecrated ====
- All Saints' is next to the site of a Priory of Grey Friars (Franciscan friars) the only relic of which is an archway at the end of the church boundary wall, which is on the line of the town wall. The medieval tower survives, abutting a later brick nave by Amon Wilds (1806) and 19th-century Gothic-style chancel. This church is now deconsecrated and serves as a community arts space, managed by the Town Council.

=== Roman Catholic ===
The Roman Catholic church is dedicated to St. Pancras in memory of the Priory and is a red-brick building over the street from St Anne's.

=== Non-conformist ===
- Lewes Friends Meeting House (finished 1784) is a Quaker meeting house next to the former All Saints' Church (now an arts centre) on Friar's Walk.
- The Jireh Chapel, off Malling Street, is a Grade I listed building, being a rare survivor of its type dating from 1805. It now houses the Lewes Free Presbyterian Church.
- Westgate Chapel is a 16th-century building located built on the original 13th century town wall foundations and a yard at the top of the High Street (Grade II* listed). So called because of its position at the old West Gate of the town wall, the chapel was in use during the 17th century and became a licensed place of worship named as Westgate Meeting on 5 November 1700 and recorded as Independent. Its liberal stance allowed it to become a Unitarian led church by 1820 (when the congregation of Southover General Baptist Chapel re-joined) It is now an Independent chapel.
- Eastgate Chapel is a very different building; a neo-Norman design of 1843 in dark flint, it originally had a pepper-pot dome but this was removed in favour of a traditional spire in case traffic vibrations below made it fall off. A modern extension has been added to the church.
- Christ Church, a modern (1953) building, serves a united congregation of United Reformed Church and Methodist worshippers.
- Southover General Baptist Chapel was built in Eastport Lane in 1741. The congregation's views moved towards Unitarianism, and in the 19th century they re-joined Westgate Chapel having earlier split from there. The building has been a house since 1972, but had various religious and secular uses before that.

== Demography ==
In 2001 the service industries were by far the biggest employers in Lewes: over 60% of the population working in that sector. A little over 10% are employed in manufacturing, mostly in the smaller industrial units.

The town is a net daytime exporter of employees with a significant community working in London and Brighton whilst it draws in employees of the numerous local government and public service functions on which its local economy is strongly dependent.

An important part of the town's economy is based on tourism, because of the town's many historic attractions and its location.

As referenced in the governance section, the town is also where three tiers of local government have their headquarters, and the head office of Sussex Police is also in Lewes.

== Lewes Bonfire ==
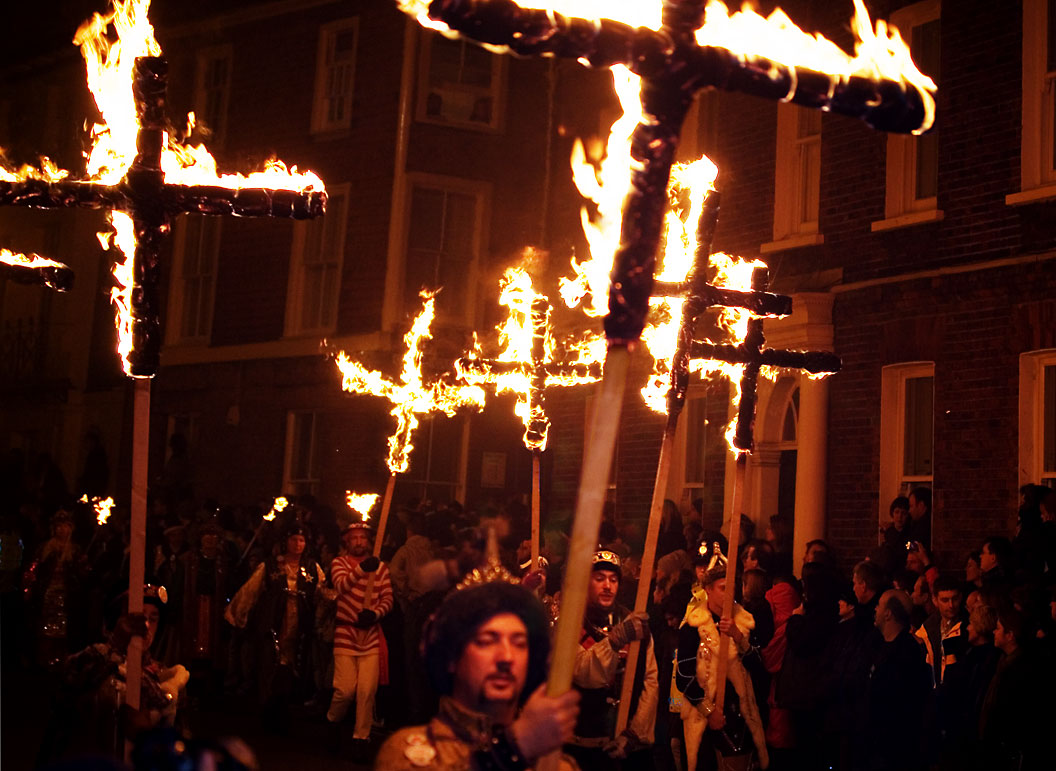
Procession of the martyrs' crosses, as part of Lewes' Bonfire Night celebrations

The town's most important annual event is the Lewes Bonfire celebrations on 5 November, Guy Fawkes Night. In Lewes this event not only marks the date of the uncovering of the Gunpowder Plot in 1605, but also commemorates the memory of the seventeen Lewes Martyrs, Protestants burnt at the stake for their faith during the Marian Persecutions. The celebrations, which controversially involve burning an effigy of Pope Paul V, who was pope during the Gunpowder Plot, are the largest and most famous Bonfire Night celebrations in the country.

== Economy ==
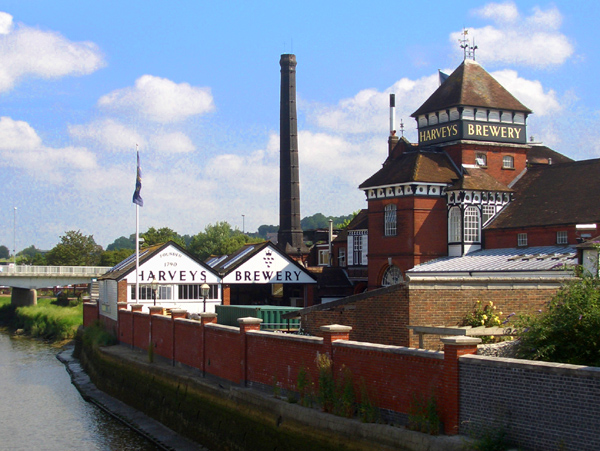
Harveys Brewery in the centre of Lewes

The Lewes Chamber of Commerce represents the traders and businesses of the town. The town has been identified as unusually diversified with numerous specialist, independent retailers, counter to national trends toward 'chain' retailers and large corporate retail outlets.

Lewes Farmers' Market, one of the first in the UK, was started in the 1990s by Common Cause Co-operative Ltd and is a popular re-invention of Lewes as a market town. The Farmers' Market takes place in pedestrianised Cliffe High Street on the first and third Saturdays of every month, with local food producers coming to sell their wares under covered market stalls. A weekly food market in the Lewes Market Tower was established in July 2010 by Transition Town Lewes to allow traders to sell local produce. Occasionally French traders from the twin town of Blois attend, vending on Cliffe Bridge.

From 1794 beers, wines and spirits were distributed from Lewes under the Harveys name, and the town is today the site of Harvey's brewery celebrated as one of the finest ale producers in England.

In September 2008, Lewes launched its own currency, the Lewes Pound, in an effort to increase trade within the town. However, it has been discontinued and is no longer valid since 31 August 2025. One Lewes Pound is equal to £1. Like the similar local currency in Totnes, the initiative is part of the Transition Towns movement. The Lewes Pound and the Transition Towns movement have received criticism for a failure to address the needs of the wider Lewes population, especially lower socio-economic groups. Such local currency initiatives have been more widely criticised in light of limited success stimulating new spending in local economies and as an unrealistic strategy to reduce carbon emissions. The Lewes Pound could be exchanged for the same amount of pounds sterling in several shops in Lewes and be spent in a wide range of local businesses. Many of the notes were sold on eBay at a higher amount. Early numbers and sequenced notes fetched very high prices from foreign collectors.

== Landmarks ==
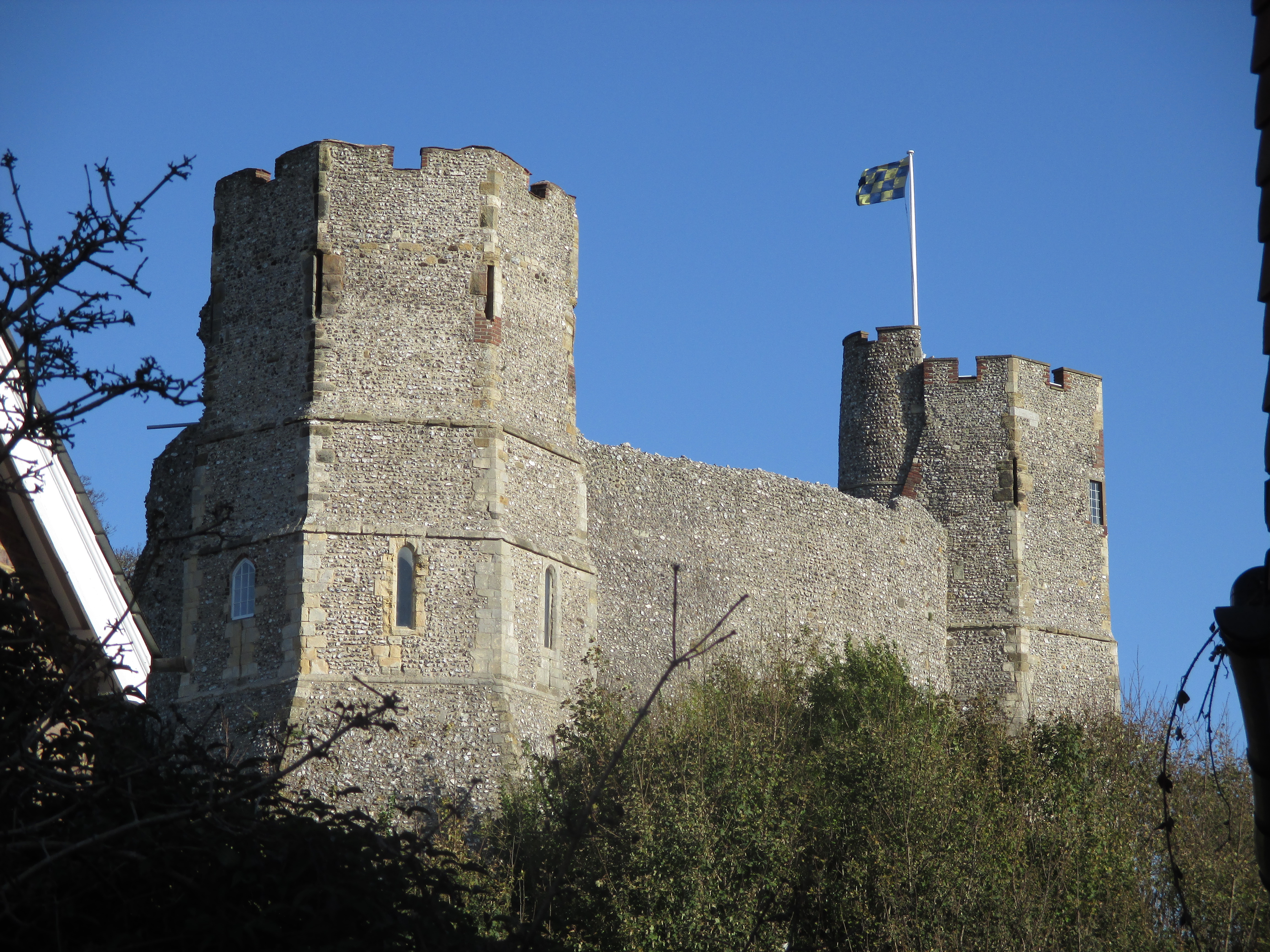
Lewes Castle

The town is the location of several significant historic buildings, including Lewes Castle, the remains of Lewes Priory, Bull House (the former home of Thomas Paine), Southover Grange and public gardens, and a 16th-century timber-framed Wealden hall house known as Anne of Cleves House because it was given to her as part of her divorce settlement from Henry VIII, though she never lived there. Anne of Cleves House and the castle are owned and maintained by the Sussex Archaeological Society (whose headquarters are in Lewes). The Round House, a secluded former windmill in Pipe Passage, was owned by the writer Virginia Woolf.

The steep and cobbled Keere Street is home to many historic buildings, including a timber framed antiquarian bookshop. The gardens of the buildings on the east side of the street border the old Town Walls. The Prince Regent once drove his carriage down the street, and a sign at the bottom commemorates this event.

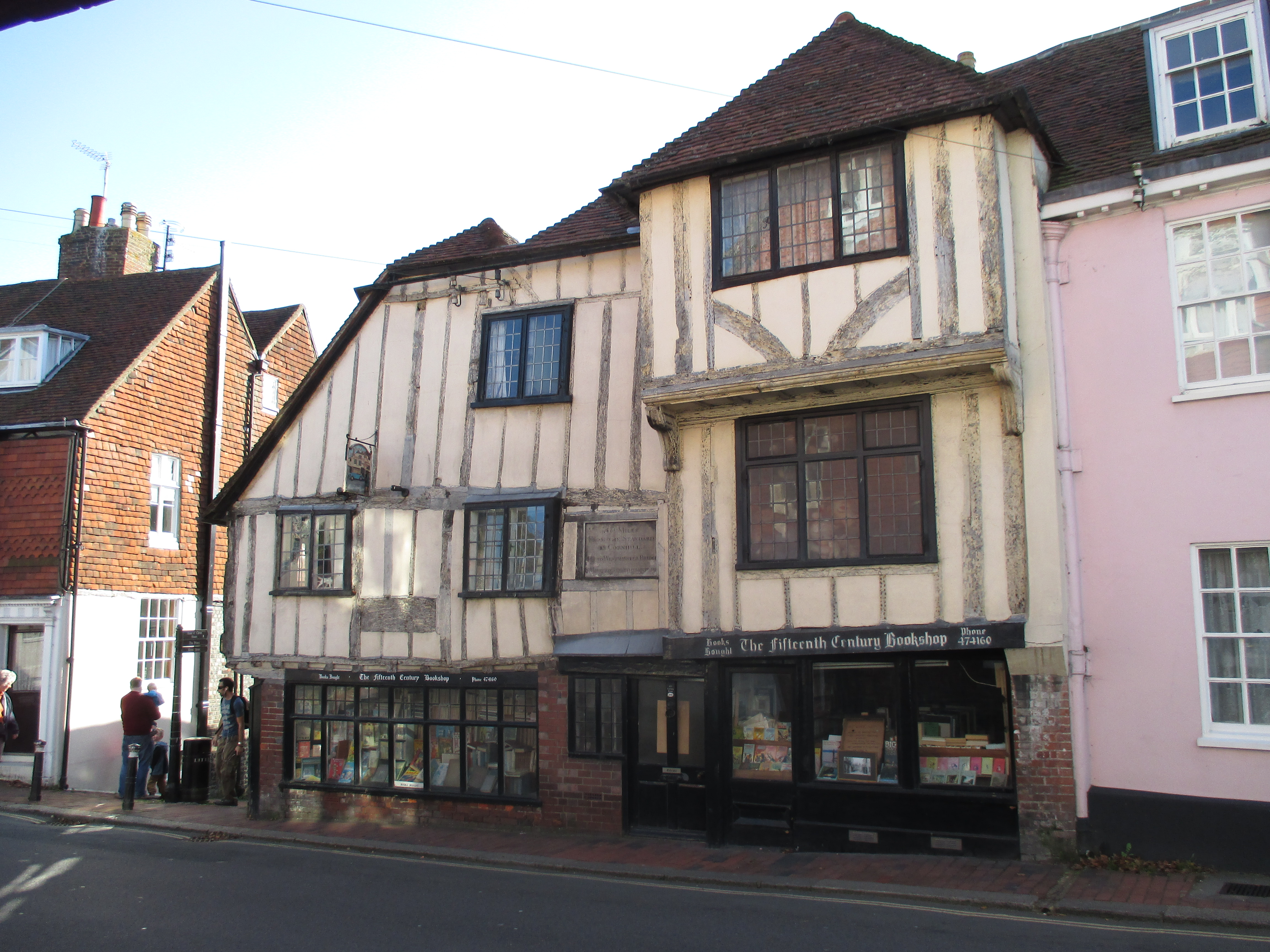
The Fifteenth Century Bookshop, on the corner of High Street and Keere Street

The ancient street pattern survives extensively as do a high proportion of the medieval building plots and oak framed houses, albeit often masked with later facades. The 18th-century frontages are notable and include several, like Bartholomew House at the Castle Gate, that are clad in mathematical tiles which mimic fine brick construction. Numerous streets of 18th- and 19th-century cottages have survived cycles of slum clearance as models of attractive town housing.

At the highest point of the old town the Portland stone and Coade stone facade of the Crown Court (1808–12, by John Johnson), the brick Market Tower and florid Lewes War Memorial mark the historic centre, although trade has tended to concentrate on the lower land in modern times. At the lowest part of the town, by the river, Harvey & Son's Brewery, 'The Cathedral of Lewes' is an unspoilt 19th-century tower brewery and is the only one of the town's five original major breweries still in use. Nearby Fitzroy House is a George Gilbert Scott designed building, constructed as a library in memory of Lewes MP Henry FitzRoy in 1862 and now a private residence. The railway station is the other important monument of the industrial era.

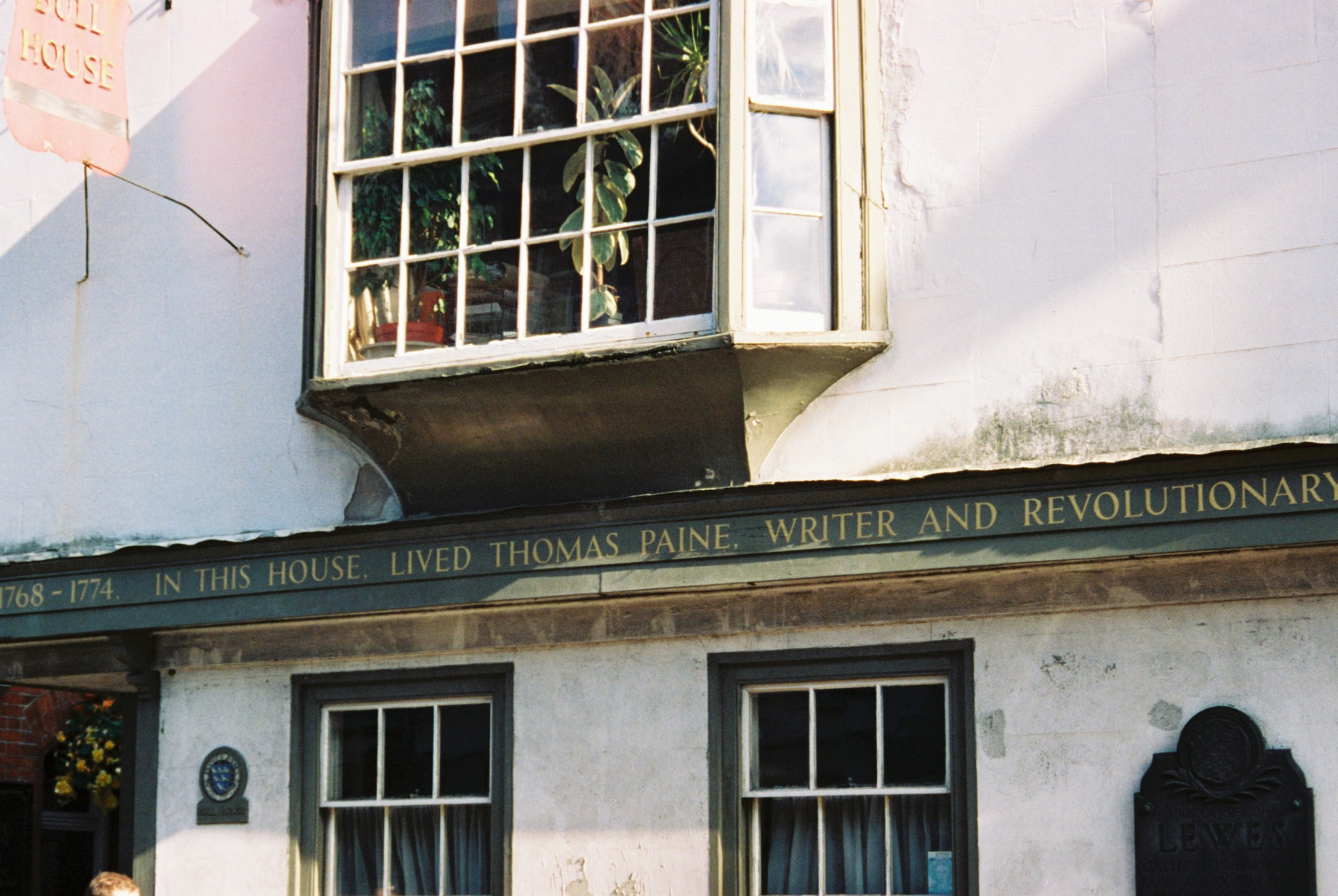
Bull House: Thomas Paine's home

Southover Grange is a grade II*listed Tudor manor house built in 1572 with Caen limestone taken from the ruins of Lewes Priory. The house and its gardens were bought by Lewes District Council and opened to the public in 1945. The house is now owned by East Sussex County Council, and it is currently being refurbished into a wedding venue, registry office and community facility. The east wing is leased to an art shop and the Window café (open in spring and summer). The Grange gardens are divided by the Winterbourne stream and contain formal bedding displays, a wildflower area, a knot garden and some notable trees, including a large Magnolia grandiflora, a mulberry tree dating perhaps to the 17th century and a tulip tree planted by Queen Elizabeth II. The gardens are open to the public during daylight hours all year round.

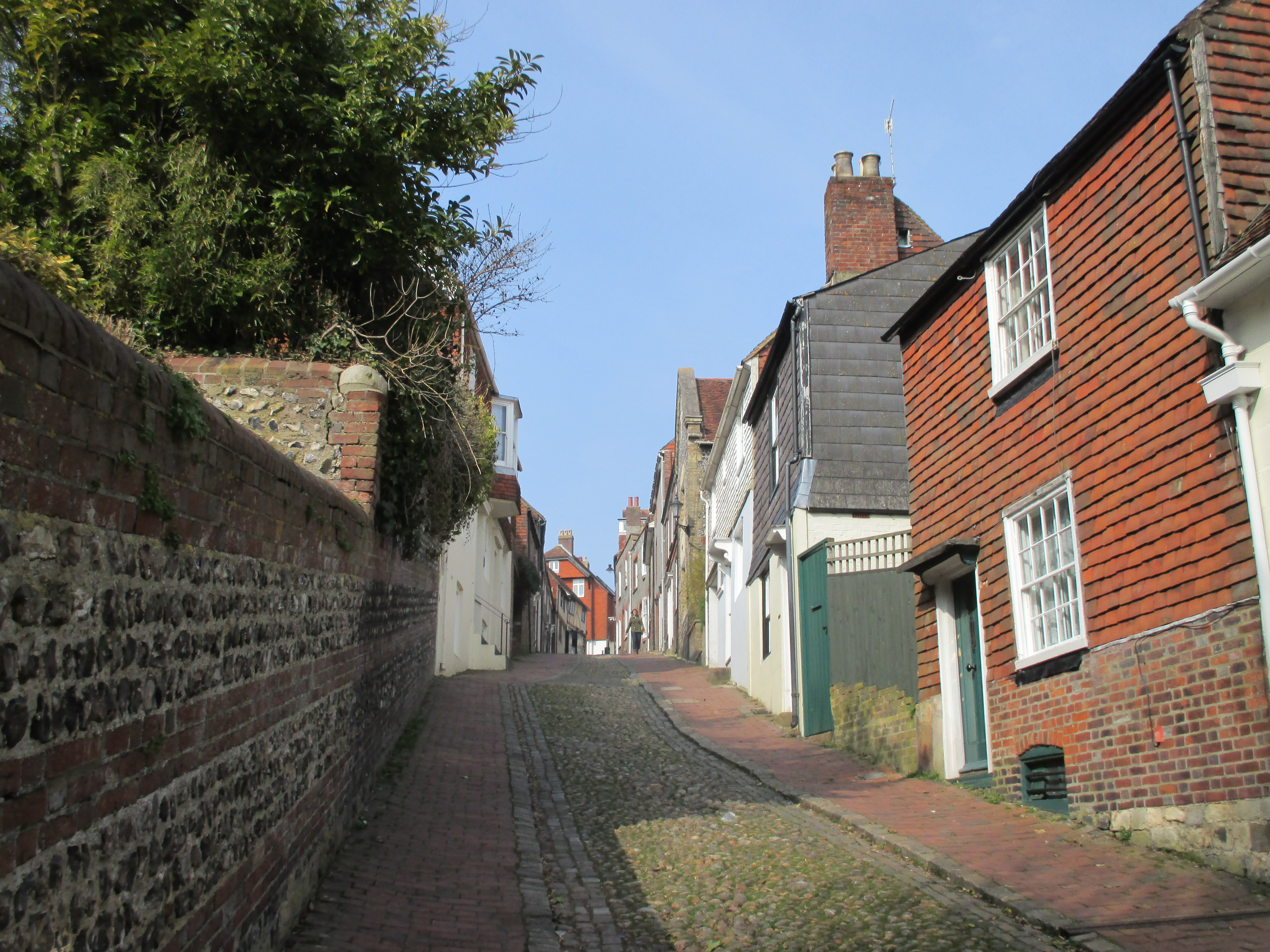
Keere Street

Pelham House dates back to the 16th century and features architecture of all subsequent eras and a private landscaped garden facing the Downs. It now serves as an independent hotel.

The centre of Lewes is notable for a consistently high calibre of regional vernacular architecture and variety of historic construction materials and techniques. A comprehensive survey of all historical plaques was conducted in 2013 by a local civic society, the Friends of Lewes.

A distinctive feature of the centre of Lewes is the network of alleyways or 'twittens' which run north–south on either side of the High Street and date back to Anglo-Saxon times. According to the Dictionary of the Sussex dialect and collection of provincialisms in use in the county of Sussex published in Lewes in 1875. "Twitten is a narrow path between two walls or hedges, especially on hills. For example, small passageways leading between two buildings to courtyards, streets, or open areas behind". Some twittens (e.g. Broomans Lane, Church Twitten, Green Lane, Paine's Twitten) remain flint-wall-lined pedestrian thoroughfares, others (e.g. Watergate Lane, St Andrew's Lane and renamed Station Street (formerly St Mary's Lane)) are now narrow usually one-way roads. The most notable of all Lewes' twittens is Keere Street. A weekly Sunday morning run up and down all the twittens on the south side of the High Street – the so-called Twitten Run – has operated in the town since November 2015.

== Public sculpture ==
=== Historic ===
With Eric Gill's move to Ditchling, the artistic community there gave rise to other sculptors in the Lewes district such as his nephew John Skelton and Joseph Cribb. Skelton's studio in Streat has continued as an educational and artist's workshop since his death in 1999. Eric Gill and Jacob Epstein conceived a great scheme for doing some colossal figures together around 1910 for a modern Stonehenge on 6 acres of land at Asheham House, Beddingham, south-east of Lewes. William Rothenstein agreed to buy the lease but the scheme failed.

Edward Perry Warren first saw Lewes House in 1889 and with his partner John Marshall they were prodigious collectors of fine antique sculpture there. Eric Gill was introduced to Warren by Roger Fry and the stone carving Ecstasy purchased, which is now in the Tate Gallery collection. William Rothenstein suggested that Warren might like to acquire Rodin's new sculpture The Kiss and after several visits, in 1904 the Lewes Kiss arrived at Lewes House. In 1906 Rodin requested that Warren lend The Kiss to an important exhibition in Regent Street, London. This made it famous in Britain for the first time. The Kiss was returned to the stables at Lewes House, where it remained until 1914 until offered to Lewes Town Council. It was placed in the Town Hall, at the South End of the Assembly Room on 2 December 1914. Early in 1915, The Kiss was wrapped in canvas and marked off with a guard rail. The Town Council returned the statue, saying only that the room did 'not lend itself to such a noble piece of statuary.' On 26 February 1917, The Kiss was once more taken to the stable block where it was to remain until Warren's death in 1928. After a short period on loan to Cheltenham, The Kiss was purchased in 1953 by public subscription and is now one of the Tate's most popular attractions.

It returned on loan to Lewes in 1999 for the exhibition Rodin in Lewes.

=== Present day ===
The Helmet (1964), by Enzo Plazzotta, stands in the grounds of Lewes Priory. The Cuilfail Spiral (1983) by Peter Randall-Page sits on the roundabout at the north end of the Cuilfail Tunnel; made of 7 pieces of Portland limestone. The Magnus Inscription (c. 1200) sits in the East wall of St John Sub Castro on the Junction of Abinger Place and Lancaster Street. The Janus Head (1997) by John Skelton and Lewes Group (2010) by Jon Edgar sit in Southover Grange Gardens. Sculpture to Thomas Paine by Marcus Cornish commissioned as a private donation was unveiled in July 2010 outside the new Lewes Library in Styles Field.

== Transport ==
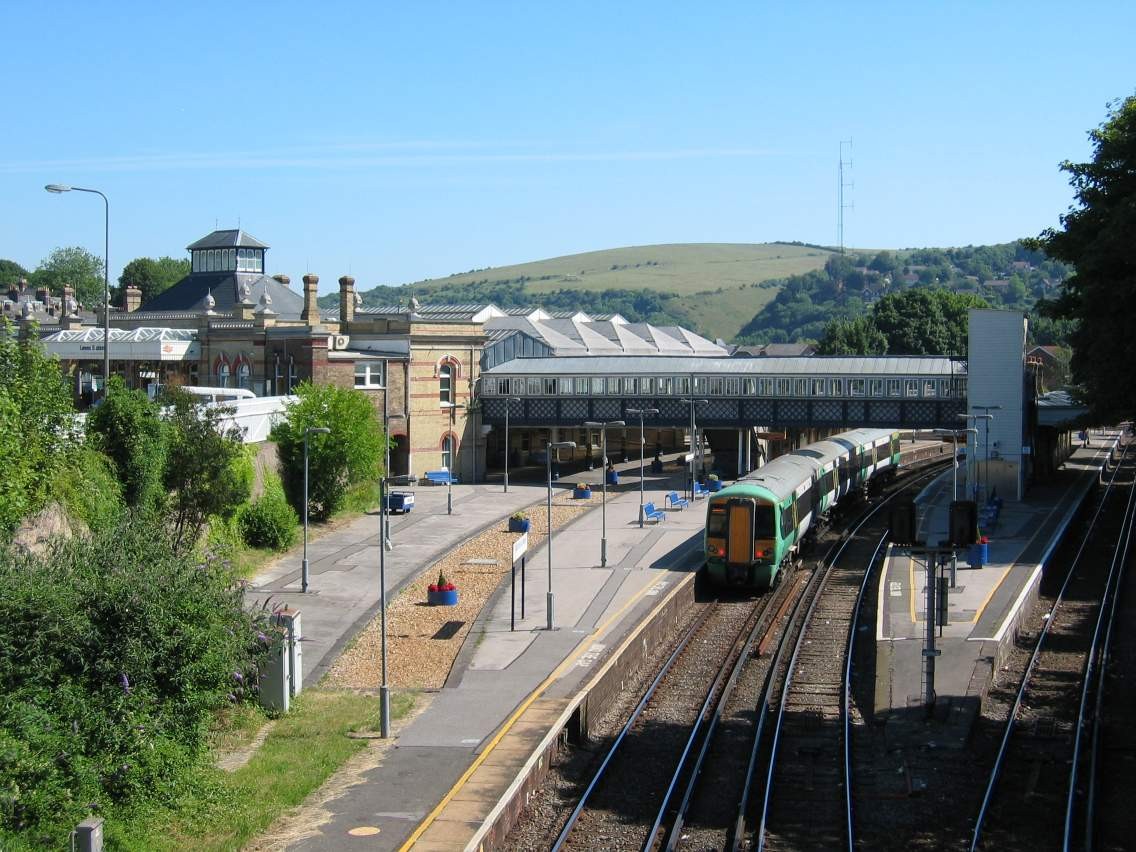
Lewes railway station, looking east. South Downs in the distance.

Lewes, from its inception, has been an important transport hub. Its site as a bridging point was probably originally a ford: today the main routes avoid the town centre. The A27 trunk road taking traffic along the south coast between Eastbourne and Southampton passes to the south of the town. The A26 from Maidstone to Newhaven; and the A275 (the London road) both come in from the north. The Brighton & Hove bus company and Compass Travel serve the town. The bus station was closed for a while, reopening in late 2008, only to close again in 2022 In 2025 planning permission was formally granted for its redevelopment.

Lewes railway station was originally the junction for six routes. The town still enjoys half-hourly fast trains from London. The two erstwhile rural rail routes to the north, linking to East Grinstead and Uckfield respectively, are both now closed, but the East Coastway Line, connecting Brighton with Eastbourne and Hastings, and the branch to Seaford remain.

The Vanguard Way, a long-distance footpath from London to Newhaven, passes through countryside east of the town. The South Downs Way also passes close to Lewes, crossing the Ouse at Southease, some four miles south of the town. The Greenwich Meridian Trail, a long-distance path that follows the Greenwich Meridian from Peacehaven in East Sussex to Sand le Mere in East Yorkshire passes through the middle of the town. A festival celebrating and encouraging walking and cycling, the Lewes Hike and Bike Festival, was created in 2012 but only ran for three years. The Eastbourne and Lewes Walking Festival was created in 2018 to promote walking in the local urban and rural South Downs area.

== Education ==
=== Primary schools ===
There are many primary schools including:

- Morley House (Lewes Old Grammar School's junior department)
- St Pancras School (Permanently Closed)
- South Malling School
- Southover School
- Wallands Community Primary and Nursery School
- Western Road School

Western Road and Southover School, despite being separate schools, are housed in linked buildings. The original Southover buildings are of red brick in the Queen Anne style, dating back to the early 20th century. The additions to it now forming the Western Road buildings date from after 1945. The two schools share a field. Pells Primary School closed in 2017. The alternative independent primary school, Lewes New School, closed in 2018.

=== Secondary schools ===
There are two secondary schools in the town and one nearby:

- Lewes Old Grammar School, an independent school which also has a sixth form.
- Priory School, specialising in the arts, languages and science.
- Kings Academy Ringmer, about three and a half miles from Lewes town centre, in a village called Ringmer, is a school for ages 11 to 16.

=== Further education ===
East Sussex College, formerly Sussex Downs College, has one of its campuses in Lewes, and provides a range of courses including A Levels, GCSEs, Functional Skills and Access courses and vocational qualifications such as NVQs and BTECs.

== Culture ==
=== Classical music ===
Located four miles (6.4 km) outside of Lewes is Glyndebourne opera house. Founded in 1934, the venue draws large audiences for its Summer Festival and has attracted a host of international talent throughout its history. Lewes Operatic Society (founded 1911) and New Sussex Opera are also based in the town of Lewes.

A number of other local classical music series operate in the town, including the Nicholas Yonge Society; and the baroque and early classical Workshop Series. The Musicians of All Saints is a Lewes-based chamber orchestra founded in 1987 who perform both new works and standard repertoire. A new annual music series, the Lewes Chamber Music Festival, was created in summer 2012. The Lewes Festival of Song was created in 2015 and the Lewes BaroqueFest in 2019. Other local music groups include the Lewes Concert Orchestra founded in 1993; and the Lewes, Glynde & Beddingham Brass Band, founded in 1922.

The East Sussex Bach choir is based in Lewes, as well as a number of other active amateur choirs, including Pro Musica Chamber Choir, the Everyman Ensemble, the Paddock Singers, Lewes Vox and East Sussex Community Choir.

Orlando Gough's opera The Finnish Prisoner is set in Lewes, telling the story of the Finnish prisoners of war held in Lewes after the Crimean War.

=== Museums and galleries ===
The principal town museum is Barbican House Museum at Lewes Castle, which hosts the Lewes Town Model as well as four galleries of Sussex archaeology. Anne of Cleves House has various collections relating to the history of Lewes. There are several independent art galleries in the town including the Star Brewery Gallery in a former brewery in Market Street; the artist-run Chalk Gallery in North Street and occasional art exhibitions at the Town Hall. Other galleries are listed in Gallery Guide Lewes and Art Map Lewes.

An extension of Charleston Farmhouse was opened in Lewes in 2023, and offers a large exhibition space, cafe and gift shop. It houses a significant part of Charleston's Bloomsbury group collection, as well as a regular rotation of visiting exhibitions.

=== Theatre and cinema ===
Lewes Little Theatre was created in 1939 and is based in dedicated premises on Lancaster Street. It puts on half a dozen or more productions each year. Supporters of the creation of the Theatre include John Maynard Keynes.

An independent three-screen cinema, the Lewes Depot, opened in May 2017 in a multimillion-pound redevelopment of a former Harvey's brewery depot close to Lewes station. The architects were Burrell Foley Fischer and the work was given a Friends of Lewes award, and highly commended in the South Downs National Park design awards. The Lewes Film Club, which also produces short movies (including the recent adaptation of George Orwell's Animal Farm), and Film at All Saints' (the Film Club in collaboration with Lewes Town Council), show films based in the All Saints' Centre, a former church.

Several scenes in the 1962 film Jigsaw, which was loosely based on the Hillary Waugh novel 'Sleep Long, My Love' and the real-life Brighton trunk murders, were set and filmed in Lewes.

=== Popular music and clubs ===
Local dance schools and clubs include Lewes Dance Club, East Sussex Dance and ballet groups. Starfish Youth Music is based at Priory School and the young bands who take part regularly perform in local venues such as the Paddock and the All Saints' Centre.

Popular music gigs take place at a number of venues and pubs across the town including the Lewes Con Club, the Snowdrop Inn, the Volunteer pub, the Lewes Arms, the John Harvey Tavern, the Pelham Arms, and the Lansdown. The Elephant and Castle hosts the Saturday Folk Club. Union Music Store based in Lewes has become a centre for modern folk, country and Americana, both promoting and hosting live gigs, and recording and producing local musicians. A monthly comedy club based at the Con Club was created in 2010. A new organisation to support local music and musicians, Lewes Ripple, was created in 2018 and as well as online platforms is looking to create live concerts in 2021.

A regular local music festival, Lewes Live (previously Rock in the Bog), takes place in the summer. The town of Lewes was also the UK location for the Mumford and Sons' Gentlemen of the Road tour stopover in 2013. A large jazz festival, Love Supreme Festival was founded in 2013 at nearby Glynde Place. Other local festivals include the Brainchild Festival, based just north of Lewes in the grounds of Bentley Wildfowl and Motor Museum

=== Art, photography, and festivals ===
Annual arts events include ArtWave and the children's Patina Moving on Parade. An annual Lewes Guitar Festival which started in 1999 has not operated since the late 2000s. The annual Charleston Festival is hosted at nearby Charleston Farmhouse near the village of Firle some 6 miles east of Lewes.

An annual festival of light – Lewes Light – was created in 2015 during the UNESCO Year of Light and has run since then as an annual art installation and environmental awareness project.

The Reeves Studio, which is thought to be the oldest continuously operated photographic studio in the world, has been running from the same premises in Lewes since 1855.

=== Debate ===
The Headstrong Club whose notable members include Thomas Paine was relaunched in 1987 and continues to operate. A branch of the popular Skeptics in the Pub movement was created in 2011 in Lewes, based at the Elephant and Castle.

=== Literature and history ===
The Lewes Literary Society (until 2015 the Monday Literary Society) was founded in Lewes in 1948 by authors Barbara Willard and Frances Howell, chaired by Leonard Woolf from 1954 to 1969, and currently by the poets John Agard and Grace Nichols, who live in the town. The Needlewriters is a co-operative of poets and writers which hosts a quarterly evening of poetry and prose at the Needlemakers Cafe, showcasing writers from across Sussex and Kent. The poetry imprint Frogmore Press, founded in Folkestone in 1983, moved to Lewes in 2010. Lewes Live Literature (LLL) was founded 1995 as a promoter of art and literature events, with an autumn festival which ran 2001–2007 bringing together spoken word with performance, music, film and visual art. Since 2007, LLL has concentrated on live literature production work.

Lewes History Group was founded in 2009 and supports an active programme of talks, information and research into the history of the town and surrounding areas. The Lewes Speakers Festival was created in the mid-2010s and brings a range of national speakers to the town each year, on a range of political, literary and historical topics.

=== Local pub culture ===
Lewes is home to a number of small craft breweries, alongside the renowned Harvey's brewery in the heart of Lewes. Notably, local support for Harvey's led to the Lewes Arms boycott, when Greene King stopped selling Harvey's Sussex Best Bitter.

Lewes also has a strong tradition of distinctive local pub games, including toad in the hole (a local pub league and international competition are held in the town). The Lewes Arms hosts events of Dwyle Flunking (the local spelling of Dwile flonking), spaniel racing and the World Pea Throwing Championships.

== Lewes in literature ==
With a number of authors having lived in or near Lewes, it features, explicitly or disguised, in a number of books.

Possibly the earliest substantial reference in fiction is in The Wanderer: Or, Female Difficulties, an 1814 novel by Fanny Burney, in which the heroine spends time in Lewes and Brighton.

Eve Garnett lived in Lewes and her The Family from One End Street series of children's stories are set in 'Otwell-on-the-Ouse'. Matthew de Abaitua's dystopian novel If Then is set in a fictionalised Lewes. There are strong parallels with Lewes in the setting of Cliffe House which appears in a story called Bloody Baudelaire, by R. B. Russell.

The Collector by John Fowles is set near Lewes with the characters visiting the town, and the Roy Grace crime series by Peter James (writer) based in Brighton has scenes set in Sussex Police HQ based in Lewes. Graham Greene's first novel The Man Within has scenes set in Lewes at the Lewes assizes.

Three novels by William Nicholson (writer) – The Secret Intensity of Everyday Life, All the Hopeful Lovers and Golden Hour – are based in Lewes and surrounding villages. Three Round Towers and Retribution by Beverley Elphick are set in and around Lewes at the end of the 18th century.

Julian Fane wrote a fictionalised version of his experience moving from London to Lewes in the novel Hope Cottage, which is set in a fictional district of Lewes named "Eastover."

Other writers to have set works of fiction in Lewes include Andrew Soutar, Judith Glover, and primatologist Alison Jolly who wrote a series of books for children.

The personal diaries of Lewes-based writer Alice Dudeney who wrote popular fiction in the first half of the 20th century were published in 1998 as A Lewes Diary: 1916–1944 describing her life in Lewes with Henry Dudeney before and during the interwar years.

Lewes also features in a range of works of other non-fiction, but notable examples would include To The River by Olivia Laing which follows her walk along the River Ouse and The Old Ways by Robert Macfarlane (writer) features walks on the South Downs close to Lewes.

In 2015, American writer Joseph Cannizzo Jr. published a collection of poetry about Lewes entitled When in Lewes, (ISBN 1517222680) following a brief stay in the town.

== Media ==
The Sussex Express newspaper (formally the Sussex Express and County Herald) was established in 1837 in Lewes as the Sussex Agricultural Express and merged with the Sussex County Herald in 1938. Now headquartered in Horsham, it serves Lewes and much of East Sussex. It has four editions and includes extensive coverage of the local sports scene. It is part of the Johnston Press network of newspapers.

Viva Lewes was founded as a weekly web magazine in January 2006 and also as a monthly print handbook in October 2006 covering events and activities in and around the Lewes area. It ceased publication in 2020.

In December 2018 a monthly lifestyle publication Town & County Magazine was launched, with coverage of local life, history, and culture, and celebrity interviews, across Lewes district as well as Alfriston & Ditchling.

Local television news programmes are BBC South East Today and ITV News Meridian (East).

The town's local radio stations are BBC Radio Sussex, Heart South, Seahaven FM and More Radio Mid-Sussex.

Lewes has its own RSL radio station, Rocket FM, which broadcasts via FM and the Internet for three weeks in October/November each year, covering the Bonfire period.

Operating since 2012, Radio Lewes is a web-based podcasting CIC. It is membership-based, and was created by the Oyster Project Charity (holders of Queen's Award for Voluntary Service)

In November 2012, EE launched a series of advertisements promoting its 4G mobile service. All of the adverts, which featured actor Kevin Bacon, were filmed in Lewes.

== Sport ==
In 1694, accounts of Sir John Pelham record 2s 6d paid for a wager concerning a cricket match at Lewes, one of the sport's earliest references.

Lewes Priory Cricket Club is based at the Stanley Turner Ground, Kingston Road. The club were Sussex League champions in 1986 and 1990 and Division 2 winners in 1999, 2006 and 2008. The club has active senior, junior and social sections.

Lewes Rugby Football Club, founded in 1930, runs several rugby teams at various competitive levels, including the senior men's sides, the women's, girls' and junior teams. Lewes RFC's home turf is the Stanley Turner Ground, Kingston Road.

The local football team is Lewes FC. The club was founded in 1885 and play at the Dripping Pan. The club is full fan owned and in July 2017, the club became the first in the world to introduce equal pay to the men's and women's teams. The Lewes FC Women's team were appointed to the second tier of the Women's Super League in May 2018. However, as other women's sides started to receive more support from their much larger men's clubs, Lewes suffered relegation into the National League South.

Lewes Hockey Club is a field hockey club based at Southdown Sports Club on Cockshut Road. It was founded in 1903 and is one of the oldest hockey clubs in Sussex, with teams competing in the South East Hockey League.

Lewes Tennis/Hockey Club (Southdown Sports Club) has 16 tennis courts, four squash courts, two netball courts and a floodlit astro/hockey pitch. Lewes Bowls Club situated behind the Mount on Mountfield Road was founded in 1922. It is affiliated to Bowls England and members play in the Meridian League and the Brighton League, as well as in informal games for pleasure. Between April and September members play on a flat lawn green with six rinks and inside the clubhouse on short mat for the winter season. Lewes Golf Club is set on downland above Cliffe Hill on the east-side of Lewes, where the sport has been played since 1896.

The town is also home to Lewes Bridge View which has adult teams competing in the Mid Sussex Football League and Lewes and District Sunday League. In 2016 Lewes Bridge View Juniors joined in partnership with Lewes FC to form Lewes FC Juniors – running Under 8s to Under 16s, with boys and girls teams.

Lewes Athletic Club caters for junior and senior athletes. The club trains at the all-weather 400m track at the end of Mountfield Road, and other locations in the area. Lewes Swimming Club was reconstituted in 1975 by Commonwealth gold medal-winning swimmer Christine Parfect (née Gosden) and others. The club has 300+ members and organises swimming sessions at Lewes, Ringmer, Newlands School, Newhaven and Seaford Head pools during term-time. Lewes Wanderers Cycling Club was reconstituted in 1950. The club organises regular time trials throughout the summer. The Moyleman, an off-road marathon event over the hills around Lewes, starting and finishing in the town, was created in 2014 and first run in 2015.

Lewes Racecourse, located immediately to the west of the town on the slopes of the Downs, operated for 200 years until it closed in 1964. Racehorse training continued at Lewes until 2020 when the area's last trainer, Suzy Smith, moved her base from Lewes to Angmering. Race days are held at nearby Plumpton Racecourse.

There are a number of Service Clubs in Lewes, including Lewes Lions Club which is a member of Lions Clubs International. The club runs various events including the Christmas Concert in December each year with the LGB Brass and the annual 'International 'Toad-in-the-Hole' Competition' and holds street collections to raise funds so as to assist people and organisations in and around Lewes. Since the 1960s, the Lewes Rotary Club has hosted its distinctive annual skittles tournament in the gardens of Southover Grange in June each year.

== Notable people ==
Among the many notable former residents of Lewes is Thomas Paine (1737–1809), who was employed as an excise officer in the town for a time from 1768 to 1774 when he emigrated to the American colonies. The Paine association sits at the centre of a radical tradition that is represented today by writers working in the town.

The sciences and natural enquiry are represented by Gideon Mantell who is credited with the first discovery and identification of fossilised dinosaur (iguanodon) teeth. Lewes doctor Richard Russell popularised the resort of Brighton. Thomas Frewen, who practised in Lewes, was one of the earliest doctors to adopt the practice of inoculation against smallpox.

Lewes is the birthplace of 16th-century madrigalist Nicholas Yonge. In the 1960s it was home to Charlie Watts of the Rolling Stones, as it is now to other musicians, including Herbie Flowers, Arthur Brown and Tim Rice-Oxley from Keane.

Daisy Ashford lived from 1889 to 1896 at Southdown House, 44 St Anne's Crescent, where she wrote The Young Visiters. Edward Perry Warren, an eccentric American collector, lived in Lewes House. In 1919 Virginia Woolf briefly owned – but never lived in – the Round House, a windmill in Pipe Passage, before moving to her final home, Monk's House in Rodmell. Diarist John Evelyn spent his boyhood at Southover Grange.

John Maynard Smith (1920–2004), evolutionary biologist and population geneticist, died in Lewes.

== Crime ==
The town is the police and judicial centre for all of Sussex and is home to Sussex Police, East Sussex Fire & Rescue Service, Lewes Crown Court and HMP Lewes.

The fact that Lewes has a Crown Court, and a prison, is reflected by the fact that many notorious people have been connected with the town. During the 1916 Easter Rising in Ireland several prominent figures involved in it were in Lewes Prison, including Éamon de Valera (1882–1975); Thomas Ashe (1885–1917); Frank Lawless (1871–1922); and Harry Boland (1887–1922). Others have included George Witton (1874–1942) involved in shooting prisoners during the Boer War.

Lewes assizes saw many important trials. In 1949 serial killer John George Haigh was sentenced to death. In 1956 suspected serial killer John Bodkin Adams had his committal hearing in Lewes before being sent to the Old Bailey, London for trial. He was subsequently tried and convicted in Lewes in 1957 for fraud, lying on cremation forms and obstructing a police search. An early case was that of Percy Lefroy Mapleton (1860–1881) hanged for murder and the subject of the first composite picture on a wanted poster.

Crime rates in Lewes (per 1000 population) 2005–2006
	Locally	Nationally
Robbery	0.17	1.85
Theft of a motor vehicle	1.67	4.04
Theft from a motor vehicle	4.59	9.56
Sexual offences	0.83	1.17
Violence against a person	16.75	19.97
Burglary	2.99	5.67

== Twin towns ==
- Waldshut-Tiengen, Germany
- Blois, France

Lewes has been twinned with Waldshut-Tiengen since 1974 and with Blois since 1963, although informal links between these two towns began in 1947.

== See also ==
- Lewes Speed Trials
- The Mise of Lewes, a peace treaty from 1264
- The Song of Lewes, a Latin poem about the Battle of Lewes
