= Southover Grange =

16th century house in East Sussex, England

Coordinates: 50°52′15″N 0°00′26″E

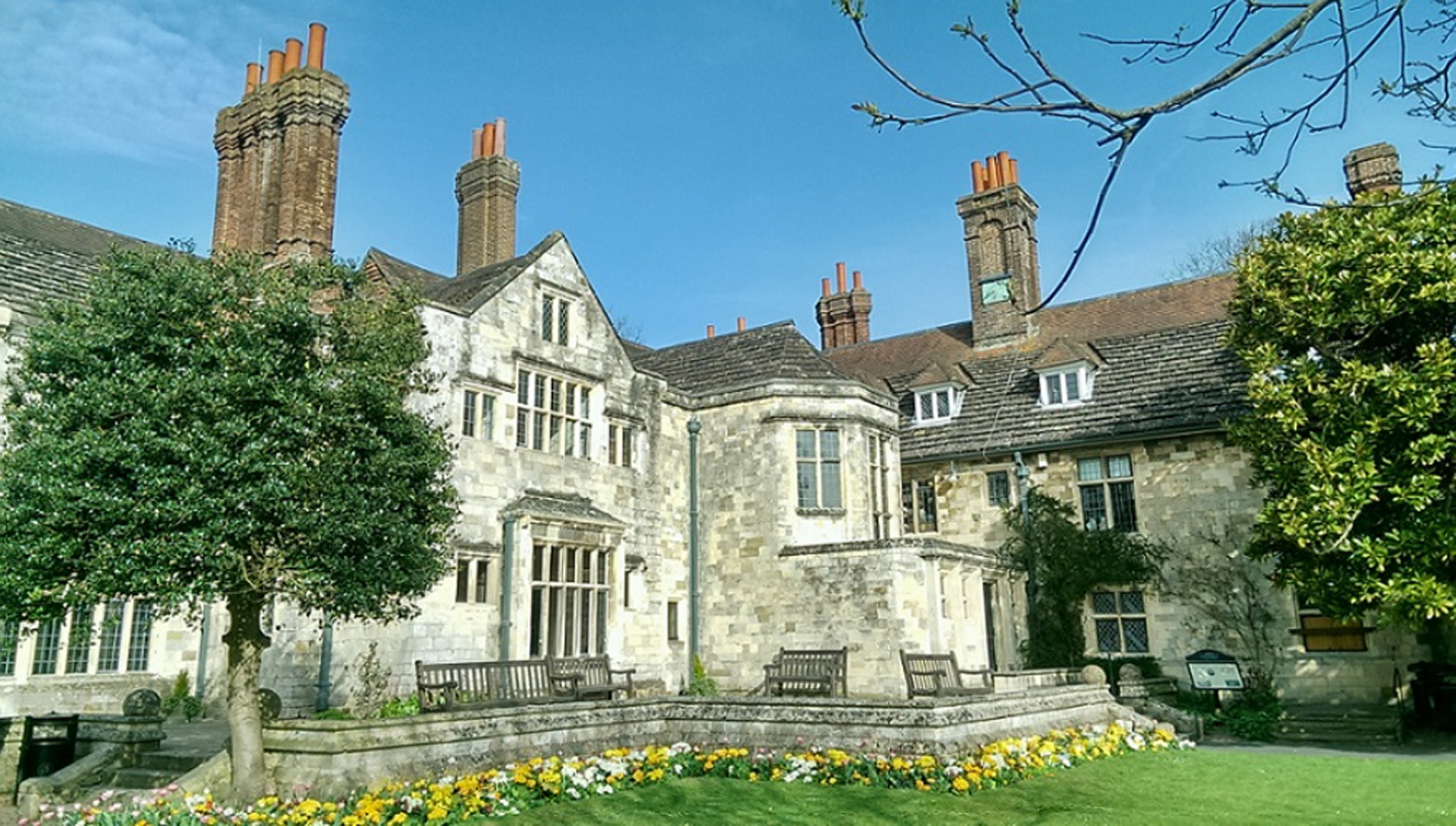
Southover Grange

Southover Grange in Lewes, Sussex is a house of historical significance and is Grade II* listed on the English Heritage Register. It was built in 1572 by William Newton and owned by this family for the next three hundred years. After this it was the residence of many notable people until it was bought by the local Council in about 1945. Today it is owned by the East Sussex County Council. It now houses the Lewes Register Office which provides Marriage Ceremony Packages, civil partnerships and citizenship ceremonies. The gardens host events from local theatre to beer an gin festivals.

== The Newton family ==
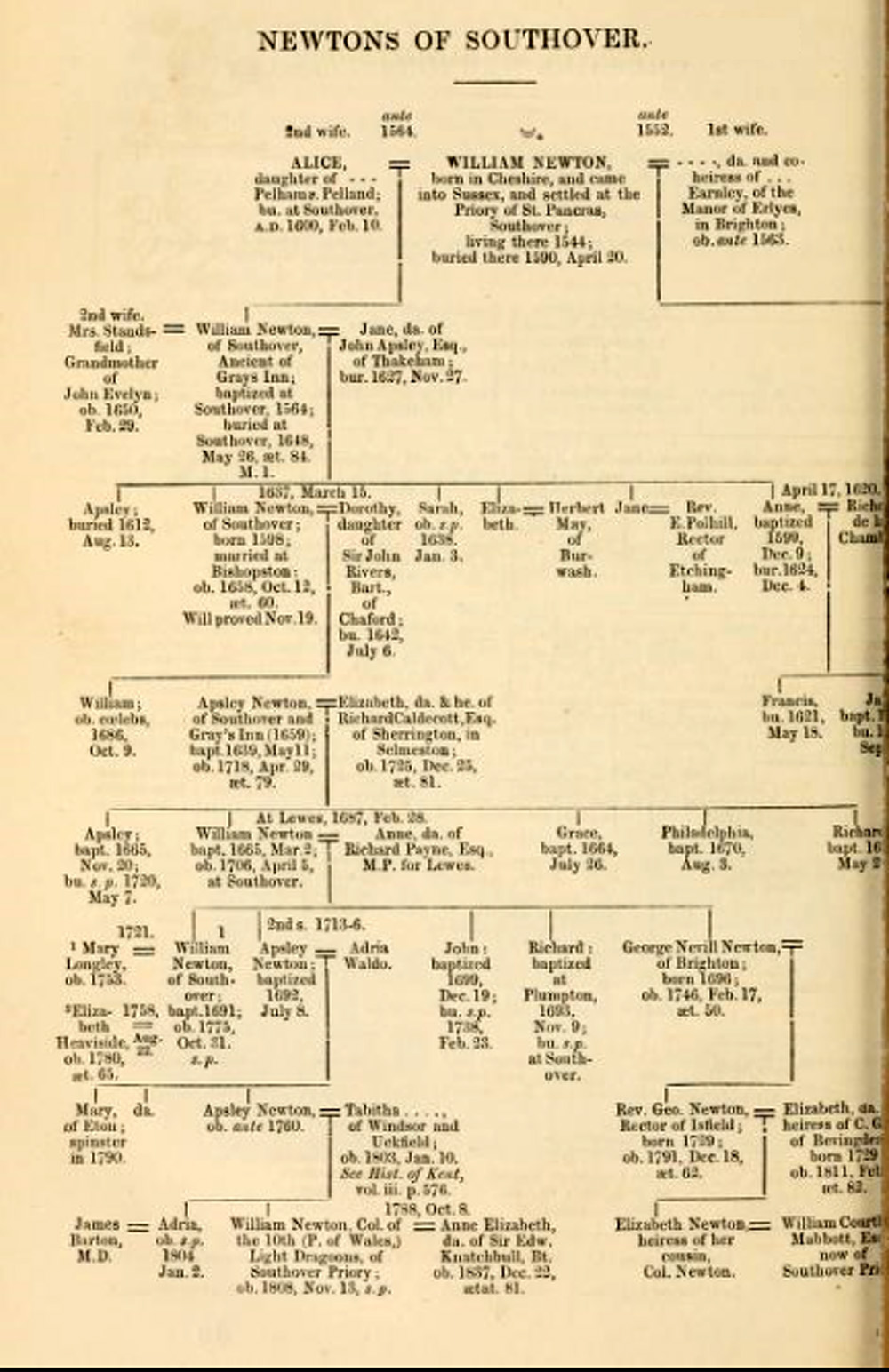
The Newton family tree

William Newton (1512–1590) built Southover Grange in 1572. He was born in 1512 in Cheshire and was the second son of Humphrey Newton of Fulshaw and grandson of the notable Humphrey Newton (1466–1536) of Pownall His mother was Ethelred Starkey an heiress of her father Lawrence Starkey and brought into the family extensive properties in York, Lancaster, Chester and Stafford.

In 1544 William and his younger brother Lawrence moved to Lewes. He lived at Lewes Priory in Southover which he leased from the then owner Anne of Cleves. In about 1550 he married Jane Ernley who was the daughter and heiress of William Ernley, owner of the Manor of Eryles. The couple had one son Nicholas Newton who was born in about 1552. In 1560 William bought a property called “East Mascalls” near Lindfield which he later gave to his son Nicholas. His wife Jane died in about 1560 and several years later William married Alice Pelham and they had one son born in 1564 and two daughters.

In 1572 William built Southover Grange with stones from Lewes Priory having obtained permission by the owner Thomas Sackville, 1st Earl of Dorset who employed him as his steward. William died in 1590 and his wife Alice died in 1600. He left Southover Grange to his second son William Newton (1564–1648).

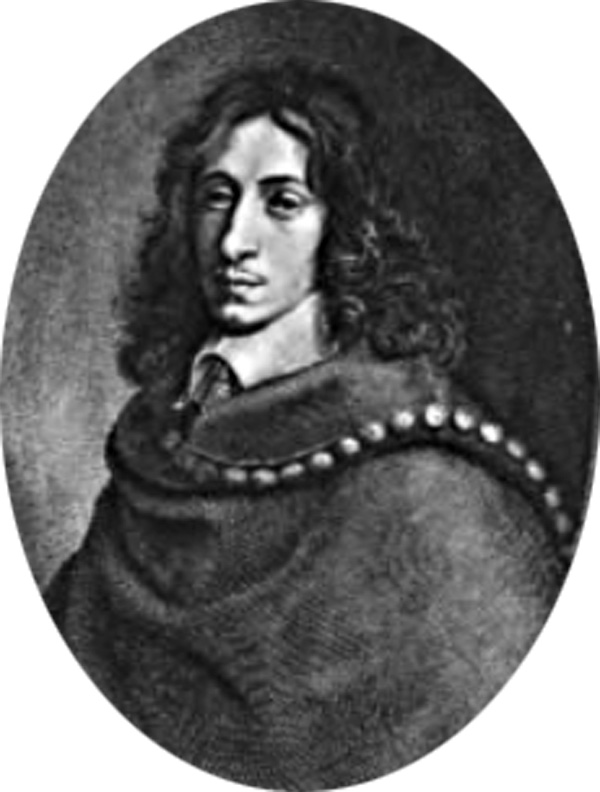
John Evelyn, the famous diarist, 1640

William Newton (1564–1648) was a lawyer. He was married twice. His first wife was Jane Apsley daughter of John Apsley of Thakeham. As part of a marriage settlement he gained the manor of Storrington. They had six children, two sons and daughters. Jane died in 1627 and William married Jane, the widow of John Stansfield who was the grandfather of the famous diarist John Evelyn. The newly married Jane Newton was very fond of her grandson John Evelyn and offered to care for him so that he could go to the free-school at Southover. His father wanted him to go to Eton but John accepted his grandmother’s offer and spent most of his childhood at Southover Grange.

William Newton died in 1648 and his second wife Jane died in 1650. William’s son by his first wife William Newton (1598–1658) inherited the property. He was born in 1598 in Lewes and in 1637 he married Dorothy, daughter of Sir John Rivers 1st Baronet. He died in 1658 and his second son Apsley Newton (1639–1718) became the owner of Southover Grange. It then passed to his grandson William Newton (1691–1775) because his son had predeceased him. When he died in 1775 Southover Grange was inherited by his great nephew Colonel William Newton.

Colonel William Newton (1744–1808) was born in 1744. His father was Apsley Newton (1718–1760) and his mother was Tabitha Johnson, a widow. His father died when he was young and his mother Tabitha inherited the Manor of Poldhurst with her sister in law Mary Newton in about 1760. William entered the military forces and in 1782 was a Major and then four years later a Lieutenant Colonel in the 10th Light Dragoons (Hussars) which were selected by the Prince of Wales (later King George IV). William was a personal friend of the Prince of Wales who often visited him at Southover Grange. In his Will he mentions that he was given a gold watch by the Prince as a pledge of his friendship.

In 1788 at the age of 44 he married Anne Elizabeth Knatchbull (1757–1837) who was the daughter of Sir Edward Knatchbull, 7th Baronet. Her nephew Sir Edward Knatchbull, 9th Baronet married the niece of Jane Austen, Fanny Catherine Knight.

William continued his military career after their marriage. From 1786 until 1793 he was the commander of the 10th Light Dragoons. He died in 1808 and Anne remained at Southover Grange until her death in 1837. They had no children so when she died William’s niece Elizabeth Mabbott inherited the property.

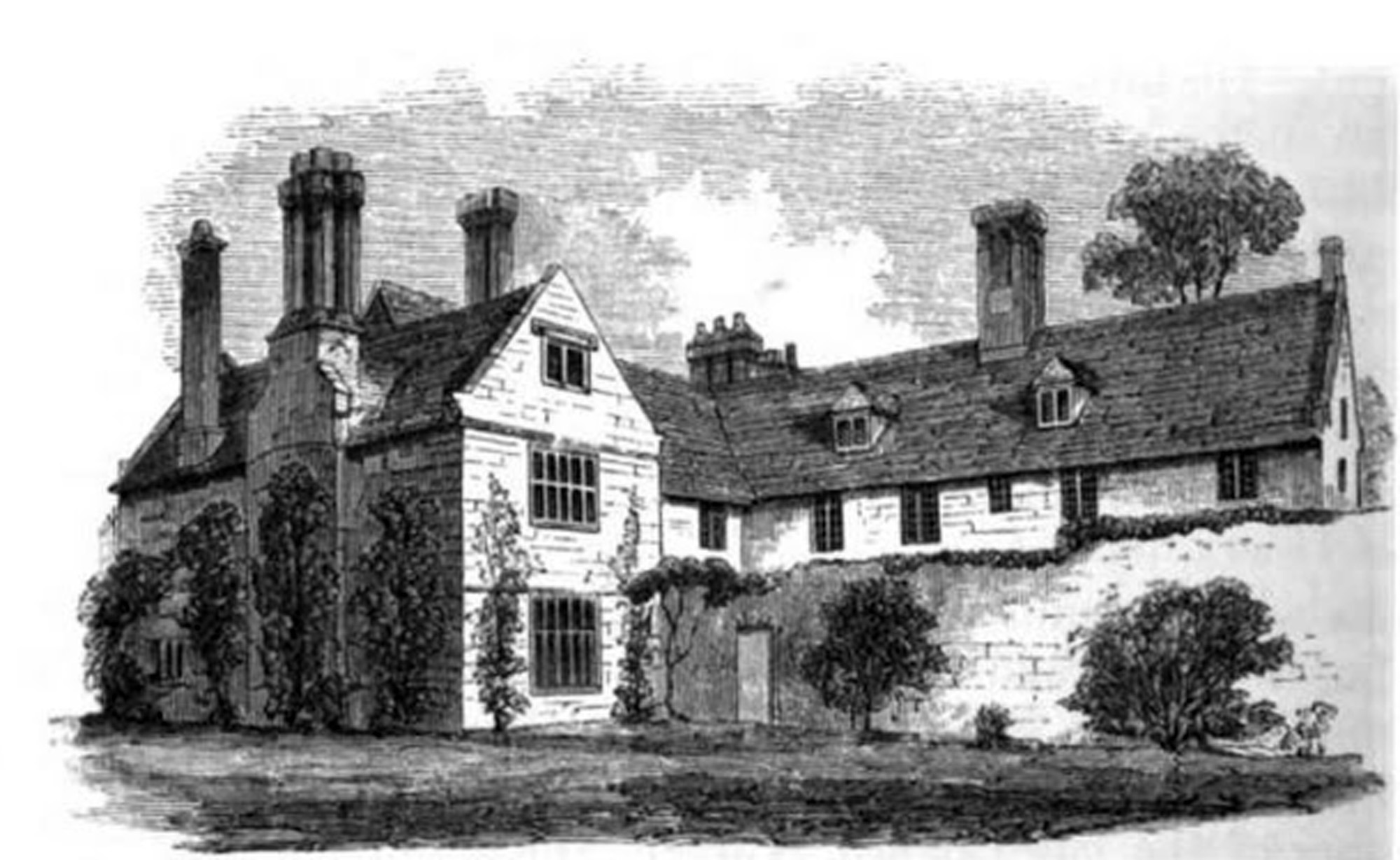
Southover Grange in 1850 before the additions of the 1870s were made.

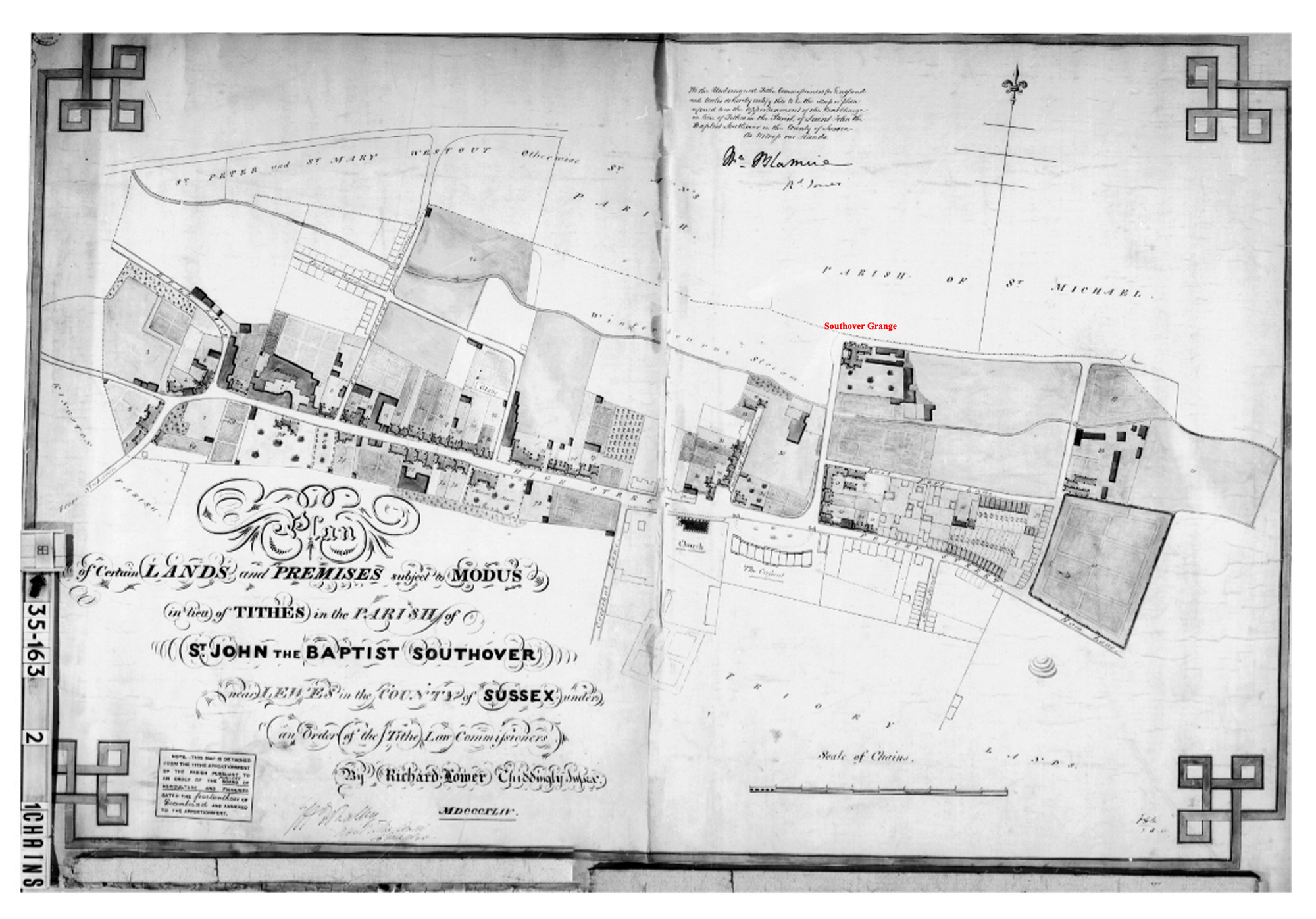
Tithe Map of Southover in about 1840. The garden wall in Southover Grange as shown in the picture of 1850 opposite is drawn.

Elizabeth Mabbott (1769–1859) (née Newton) was born in 1769 in Isfield, Sussex. She was the only child of Reverend George Newton (1729–1791) and Elizabeth Geere (1729–1811). She was an heiress from many sides of the family. Besides the Newton inheritance her cousin Thomas Holles Payne left her Ovingdean Manor when he died in 1799 and the Geere family left her Bevendean Estate in 1811 when her mother died.

Elizabeth married William Courthorpe Mabbott (1774–1860) in 1808. He was born in 1774 in Hampshire. His father was William Mabbott (1745–1812) of Cassington and his mother was Frances Courthorpe. At an early age he entered the 11th Hussars and in 1798 became a Lieutenant. He fought at the Battle of Waterloo. After his father died in 1812 he inherited his estates so he retired from the army and became a country squire. He was a controversial figure as he helped to suppress the Swing Riots during the 1830s. He also wrote many letters to the newspapers expressing his political views.

Elizabeth died in 1859 and William died the following year. In 1864 the house was advertised for sale and the sale notice is shown. The property was bought in 1865 by Captain Charles Wyndham.

== Owners after 1860 ==
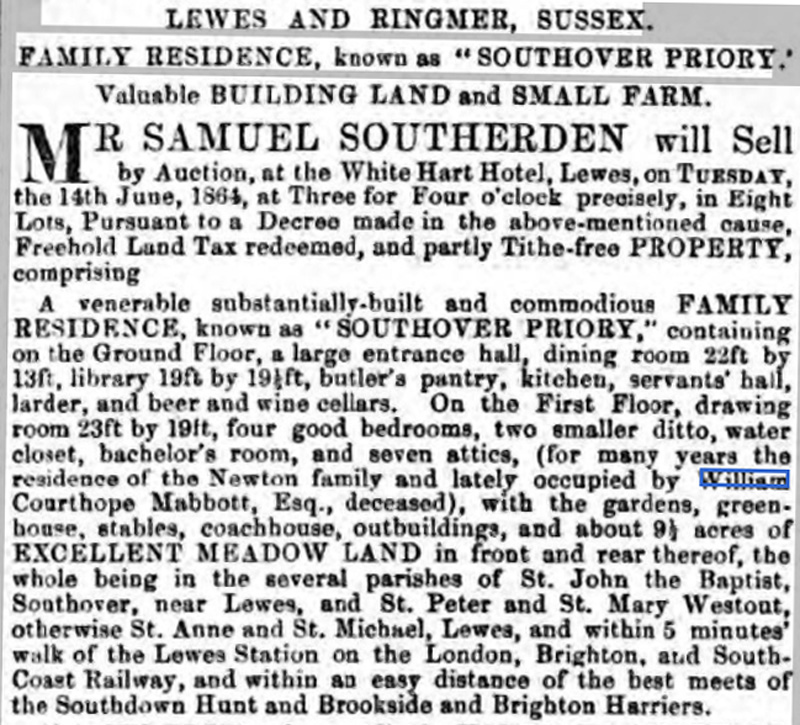
Sale notice for Southover Grange (sometimes called Southover Priory) in 1864

Captain Charles Wyndham (1827–1908) was born in London in 1827. His father was Colonel Charles Wyndham of Rogate Lodge. He entered the military forces and served in 9th Bengal Cavalry for some time. He married twice – his first wife died in 1858 and then in 1863 he married Charlotte Anketell Jones (1834–1923). Shortly after their marriage they moved to Southover Grange where their three children were born. He sold the house in 1871 to William Laird Macgregor.

William Laird Macgregor (1816–1891) was born William Laird but he told an American woman Ellen McGowan Biddle that he added the name Macgregor when he inherited his mother’s estates. His father was a wealthy shipbuilder who was responsible for what later became the Cammell Laird and Co shipyard. William was a partner with his brothers Macgregor Laird (1808–1861) and Hamilton Laird in a firm called the African Steamship Company.

In 1844 he married Louisa Helen Lister and the couple had four children and lived in Liverpool for many years. However at the age of 54 in the 1871 Census for Reigate he was shown to be living in a de facto relationship with 37 year old Martha Maria Hayter who was his wife’s niece. In the same year he bought Southover Grange and made significant alterations and additions. He rebuilt the southeast portion, installed the present main staircase, extended the east wing and added a new outer hall. It may have been for his new partner that he made these improvements. However the relationship appears not to have lasted as by 1874 he left the country and did not return. The house was advertised for sale in 1878. He acquired several villas in Arcachon in France and lived there until his death in 1891. Martha may have rejoined him later as her probate records show that she died in Arcachon in 1893. The records state that she was a spinster but she was known by the names of both Hayter and Macgregor.

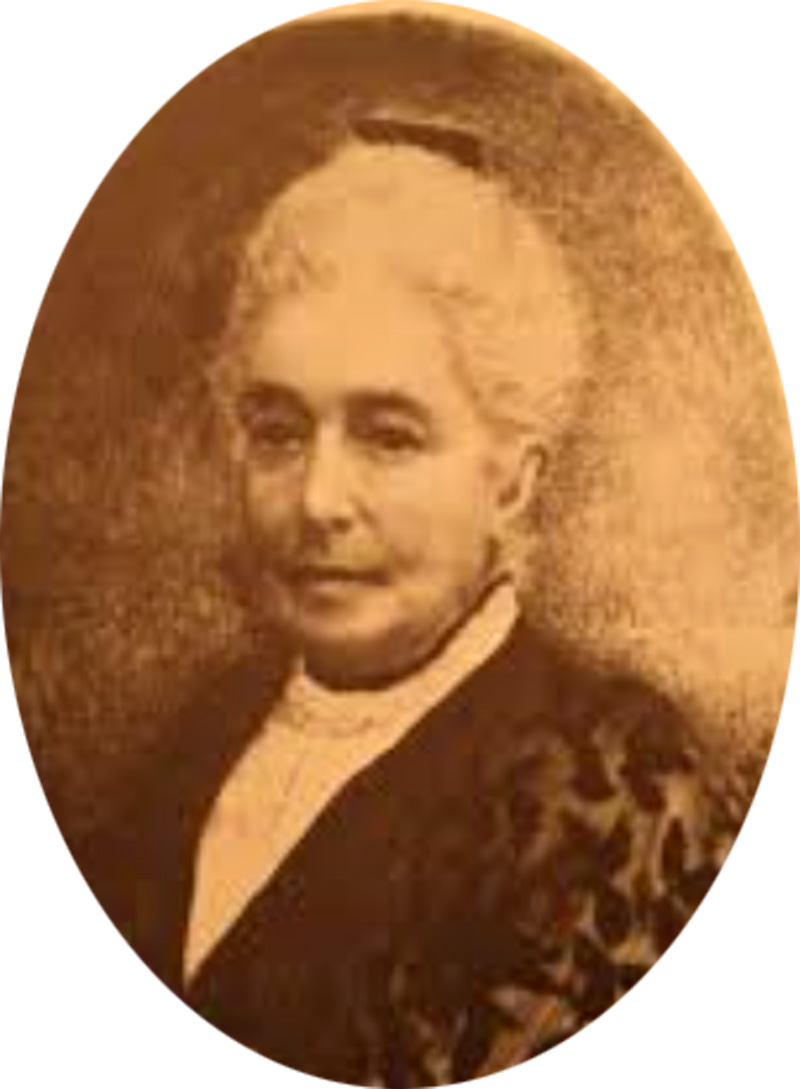
Isabel Jane Thorne

The house was sold in 1878 to Joseph Thorne (1823–1885) a retired merchant who previously lived in Shanghai. He was born in 1823 in London. In 1856 he married Isabel Jane Pryer (1834–1910). He became a partner in the firm Thorne Bros and Co who were tea and silk merchants in Shanghai. He lived here for many years and then returned to England shortly before he bought Southover Grange. He was the Mayor of Lewes in 1884. His wife Isabel Jane Thorne was a notable advocate for the employment of women in medicine. She was one of the women called the “Edinburgh Seven” who tried unsuccessfully to gain medical qualifications at the University of Edinburgh. The campaign they fought gained national attention and won them many supporters, including Charles Darwin. She then helped to establish a School of Medicine for Women at London University which was a success. In her obituary in the Times in 1910 she was hailed for her efforts in promoting the causes of women even before the suffragette movement.

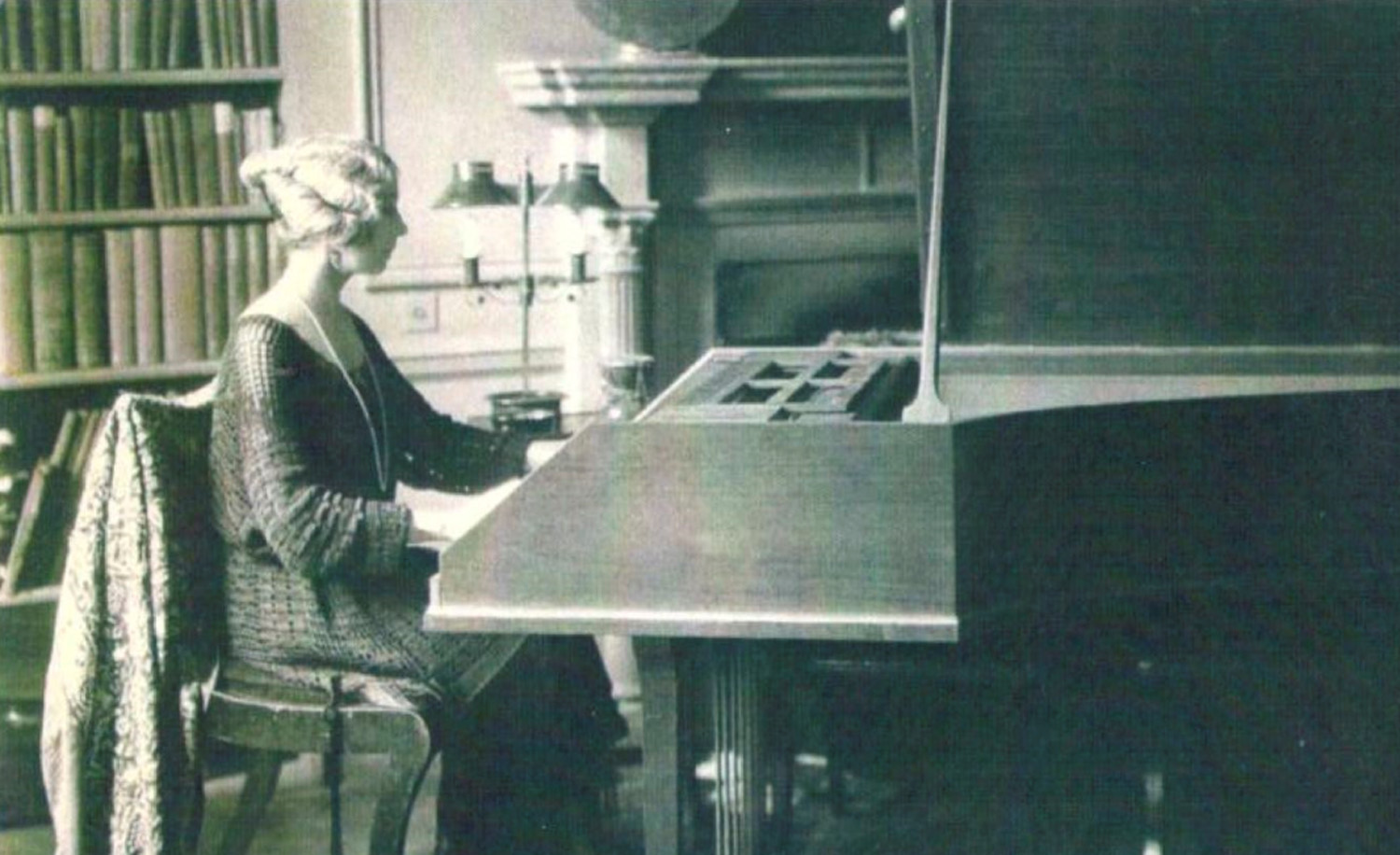
Violet Gordon Woodhouse

Joseph Thorne died in 1885 and Isabel continued to live at Southover Grange until 1901 when she sold the house to John Gordon Gordon Woodhouse.

John Gordon Gordon Woodhouse (1871–1951) was the husband of Violet Gordon-Woodhouse, the harpsichord player. John was born into a very wealthy family of wine merchants. His father was John Woodhouse who created the popular fortified wine marsala. John Gordon was educated at Cambridge and in 1895 married Violet. They had a house in London as well as owning Southover Grange where they often entertained large groups. They sold the house in 1907 and it was bought by Emily Stewart-Jones who was a wealthy widow.

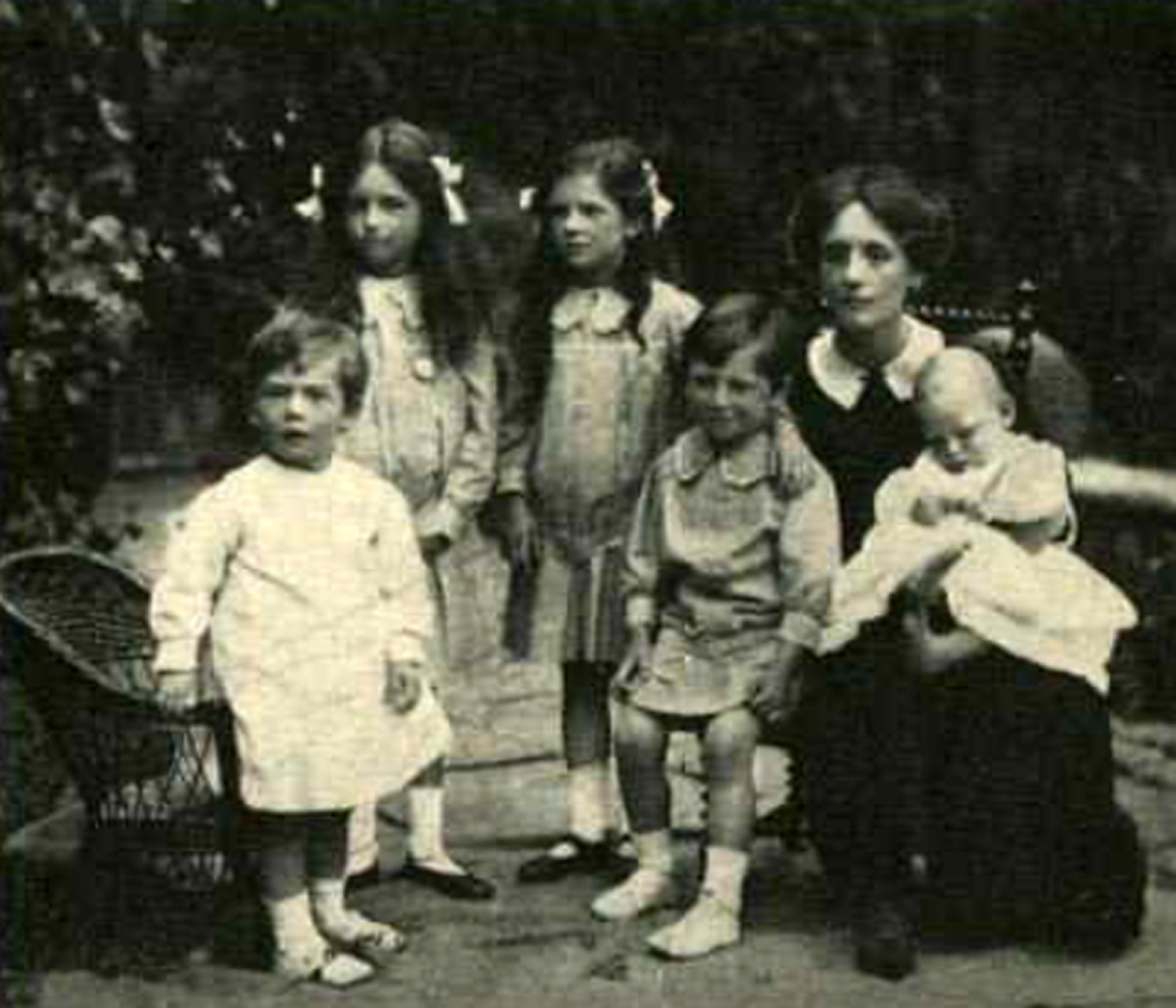
Eva Joan Stewart-Jones and her children at Southover Grange in 1916.

Emily Elizabeth Paulina Stewart-Jones (1843–1934) was born in 1843 in Devon. Her father was the Reverend William Thorold. In 1871 she married Edward Stewart-Jones who was a property owner. The couple had two children – a son named Thorold and a daughter, Pauline. Edward died in 1900. When Emily bought Southover Grange in 1907 her son Thorold Arthur Stewart-Jones who was a barrister lived with her. He married Eva Joan Holland in 1908 and she also moved into the Grange. Over the next seven years the couple had five children. Unfortunately Thorold died in 1915 in the war. He was killed in action while leading a charge on the Western Front. His wife Eva and the five children remained at Southover Grange with Emily. A picture of them at the house is shown. Emily sold the property in about 1920 and John Ernest Howarth Lomas bought the house.

John Ernest Howarth Lomas (1868–1939) was the Director of many South African finance, mining and other companies. In 1894 he married Sara Frances Wills and the couple had two children Florence Mary Lomas, born in 1894; and John Ernest Wills Lomas born in 1896. This family lived at Southover Grange until about 1938 when it was sold to Harrie Stacey.

Harrie Stacey (1866–1947) was born in 1866 in Surrey. In 1889 he married Olive Hillman the daughter of Aubrey Hillman of Saxonbury House in Southover. For 42 years he farmed Place Farm in Firie and then retired to live in Lewes. He was an active member of the National Farmers Union and later became a Councillor of the Lewes Town Council. He owned a fairly large amount of property and became wealthy. In about 1944 he sold Southover Grange to Lewes Council and it is now owned by East Sussex County Council.
