= Railway Land, Lewes =

UK nature reserve

Coordinates: 50.871°N 0.018°E

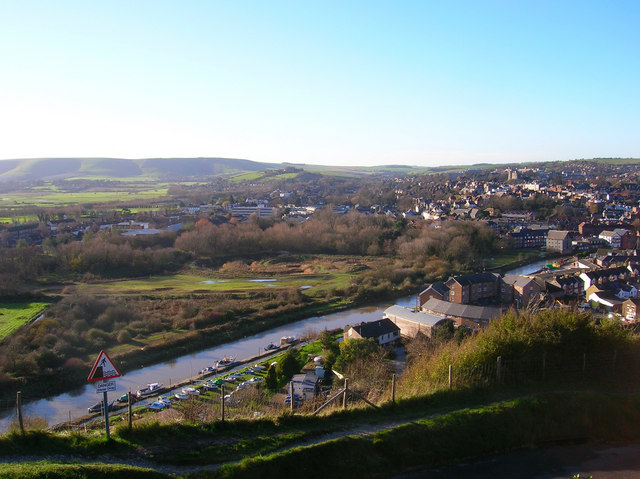
- Interactive map of Railway Land, Lewes
- Type: Local Nature Reserve
- Location: Lewes, East Sussex
- OS grid: TQ 421 099
- Area: 10.9 hectares (27 acres)
- Manager: Lewes District Council and Railway Land Wildlife Trust

Railway Land, Lewes is a 10.9-hectare (27-acre) Local Nature Reserve in Lewes in East Sussex. It is owned by Lewes District Council and managed by the council and the Railway Land Wildlife Trust.

This former railway goods yard has diverse habitats including grassland, wet willow woodland, floodplain grazing meadows, reedbeds, a network of drainage ditches and a tidal winterbourne stream. Bird species include woodpeckers, common kestrels and common kingfishers.

There is access from Railway Lane.
