= Pells Pool =

Outdoor swimming pool in Lewes, East Sussex, England

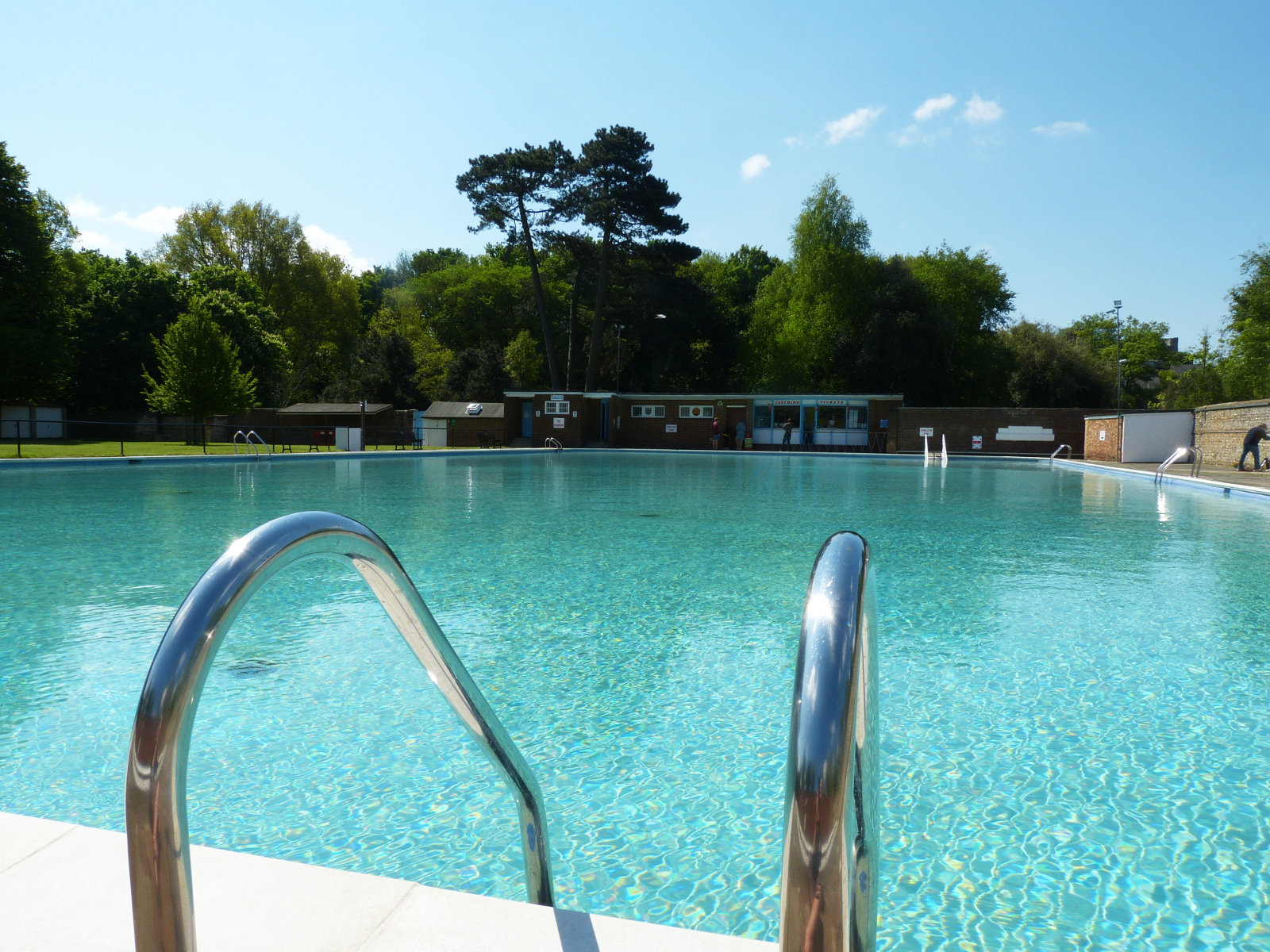
- Interactive map of Pells Pool
- Location: Brook Street, Lewes, East Sussex, BN7 2BA
- Coordinates: 50.877452°N 0.009691°E
- Owner: Lewes Town Council
- Operator: Pells Pool Community Association
- Type: freshwater lido
- Facilities: sun-terrace, paddling pool, refreshments, lawn, floats, disabled access, toilets
- Dimensions: Length: 45.72 metres (150.0 ft); Width: 22.86 metres (75.0 ft)

Construction
- Opened: 1860

Website
- pellspool.org.uk

Pells Pool is a public outdoor swimming baths or lido in Lewes, East Sussex, England. The original structure was built in 1860 making it the oldest freshwater outdoor public swimming baths in the United Kingdom that is still operating.

== Description ==
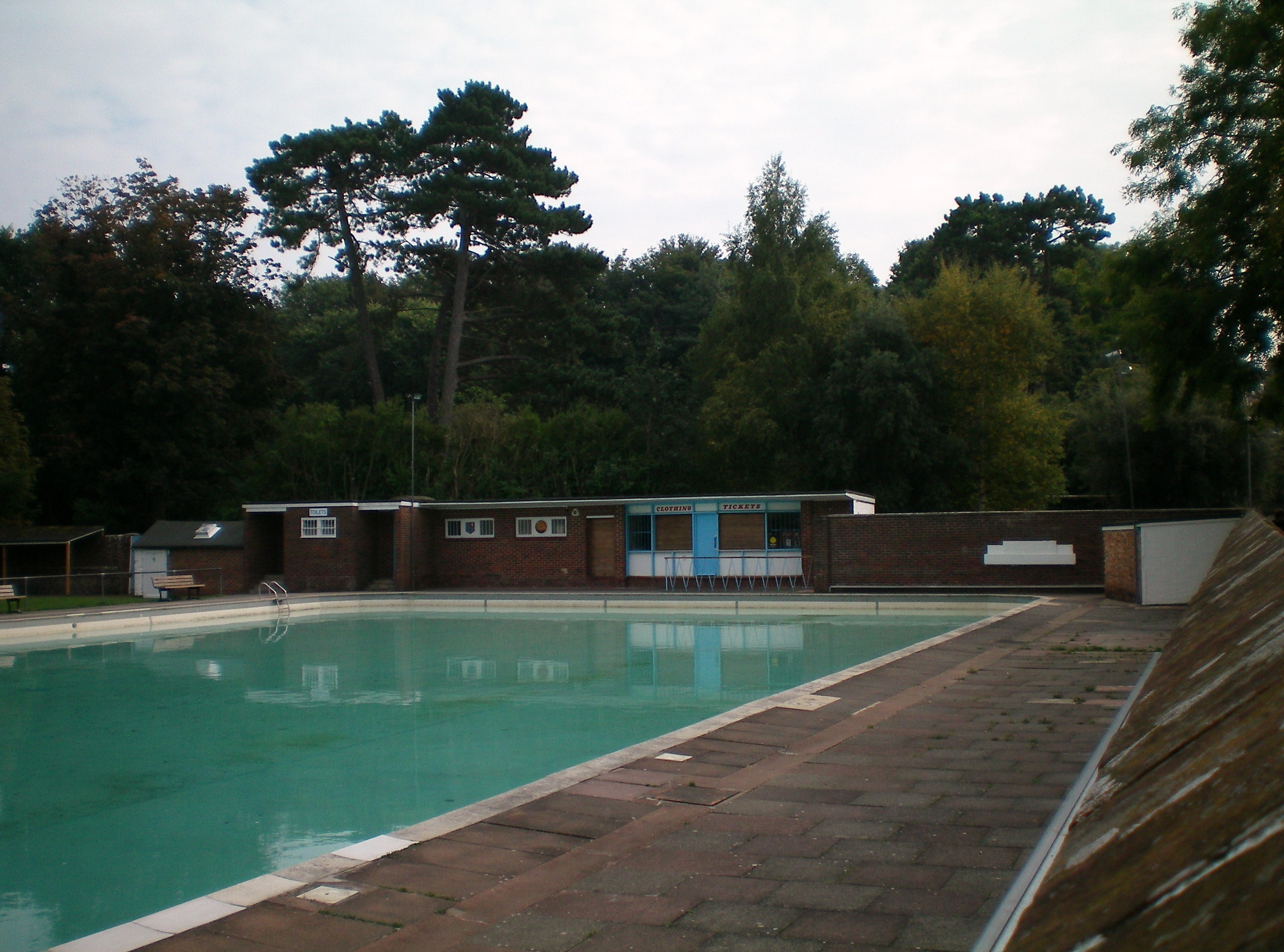
The pool

The pool is fed by spring water drawn from the chalk aquifer beneath the baths and is 50 yards long by 25 yards wide (approx 45.7 x 22.9 metres). Facilities include disabled access and toilets, changing rooms, a sun terrace, a large lawn alongside the pool, cold and warm outdoor showers, a small paddling pool and a kiosk selling refreshments. It is open every day in season, which typically runs from early May to late October, and with an autumn season (since 2017). Its 160th consecutive season ran from Saturday 25 July to Sunday 1 November 2020, with COVID-19 restrictions in place, and its 2021 season opened on Saturday 8 May.

== History ==
The Pells outdoor swimming baths in Lewes is the oldest documented fresh or spring water public pool in the United Kingdom that is still running. The baths were established by public subscription in 1860 and built in 1861, and originally had two pools alongside each other—a subscription bath, and a public bath that was free. The current pool is set within the brick-lined subscription bath, with the lawn alongside it where the free baths were. The land on which they were constructed, the Town Brook, was originally gifted to the townspeople of Lewes in May 1603 by John Rowe, a local lawyer. The original document (with the James I of England wax seal) is in the vaults of the local Town Hall.

In the mid-19th century, those in charge of the Borough of Lewes sought to create a public swimming baths, drawing the water, then as now, from the spring water under the land. By public subscription, 442 pounds 5 shillings and 6 pence was raised, and donors included many of the town’s leading citizens, including local MPs, Baxters print works, and Harveys and Beards breweries. Those donating £5 or more were given lifetime free admission to the pool, then known as the Lewes Swimming Baths.

As recorded in the Lewes Town Book from 1860:

“It having been a matter of deep regret that the Town of Lewes possessed no public Swimming Baths nor any convenient or safe place for bathing the Constables of the Borough desirous of promoting an object of such public importance invited the Co-operation of their Townsmen in bringing the matter to a practical issue.

“The "Town Brook" was selected as the site peculiarly appropriate for the purpose – Meetings were held, plans were drawn and estimates prepared Subscription lists were opened and local committees formed for collecting subscriptions throughout the extended Borough it being also agreed that a Donation of £5 and upwards should entitle the Donor to a permanent free admission to the Baths.

“The Constables finding that their appeal to their Fellow Townsmen was most liberally responded to, entered into a Contract with Mr. George Harman for the construction of the Baths together with suitable dressing rooms and a Cottage for the residence of an Attendant.”

The work of construction however was delayed that year "owing to the extraordinary wet weather interfered with and delayed" and completed 1861. The baths opened on Wednesday 29 May 1861: "despite a north easterly gale brought into immediate requisition by the public, giving the greatest satisfaction to those who used them". With the money raised by subscription two separate baths were built, screened from the Pells millpond by a tall flint wall and elegant brick entrance. People had to pay to use the subscription baths (5 shillings for a season ticket, or 6d for a day), or they could use the larger, shallower public bath alongside free, where people both swam and washed themselves. The new baths thus kept working men from swimming naked in the Pells millpond which they had previously done – and gave local workers a place to wash.

The baths were open from 6am to 9pm, allowing working men to bathe before their working day started and after it had finished. They opened for only three hours on Sunday mornings until 9am. Women were allowed to bathe, but they were admitted at separate times to the subscription baths on two mornings when they were reserved just for women. Men and women bathed separately, and there is no indication that girls under the age of 14 were admitted at all. Over 200 season tickets were sold at 5 shillings (3/6 for boys) and more than 1000 daily admissions at 6d (3d for boys) over the first season.

The baths were not always pristine, as a letter to the Sussex Express and County Herald recorded in the 1870s: “The baths were opened on 1 May this year and have been, owing to recent hot weather, extensively patronised. Yet notwithstanding this they have not been cleaned out or supplied with clean water ... A large portion of the surface is covered with floating scum and underneath the water seems mainly composed of small particles of dust and dirt.”

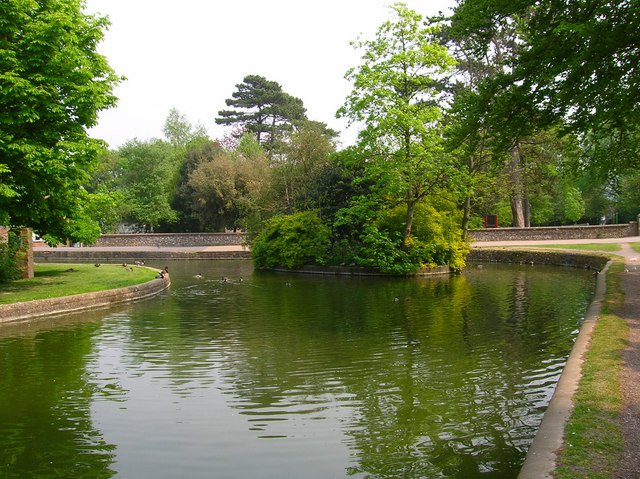
The Pells area

The wider Pells area around the ponds was developed into a kind of Victorian pleasure gardens and constituted the major public grounds in Lewes. The Pells recreation ground was created as a walled garden and playground for children in 1897, commemorating Queen Victoria’s Jubilee. The bath attendant's duties included maintenance of the wider Pells grounds and pond. In very cold winters, the pond and wetlands froze and could be skated on. The water in the swimming baths made a better and smoother skating surface, and it was lowered to allow it to freeze, with tickets sold for 2d at the baths. Records show this continued in the first half of the 20th century, with nearly 100 tickets sold in February 1928.

The Pells continued to be used during the Great War, and although the number of season tickets sold was small, daily attendances were high in sunny years. In the 1920s, the Lewes Education Committee paid for an instructor at the baths each year to help children to learn to swim, with the successful swimmers getting a season ticket free for the following year. Swimwear became the norm, and girls swam as well as boys, with both sexes wearing similar one-piece costumes. The pool continued to be popular and improvements were made with changing cubicles (called "boxes" at the time) being added, new toilets put in and the old oil-powered pumps replaced with electrical pumps in 1928. The records show that the pool made a healthy annual surplus, which was then reinvested periodically in improvements, as well as paying for the annual maintenance costs.

The first increase in ticket prices did not take place until 1934, 70 years after the pool opened, when the season ticket prices went up from 5 shillings to 7 shillings and sixpence, and day tickets from threepence to fourpence. Bad flooding in 1937, plus severe frost damage from earlier years, meant significant repairs to the pool were needed, and the bath attendant’s cottage was condemned in 1938 as unfit for habitation. The free bath also fell into disuse as indoor sanitation improved.

With the outbreak of the Second World War, large numbers of troops were stationed in the town and the Pells Pool was used for training – for example firemen trained dressed in full kit and carrying equipment to help them prepare for sea or river action. When the war ended, the Borough of Lewes bought the elegant Grange Gardens which lie on the south side of Lewes to create a new public park. They had plans to build a heated indoor swimming pool on the eastern side of the Grange with a car park alongside. The pool and the lake at the Pells would have been turned into playing fields, with the whole area grassed over. Public protests and the lack of public resources meant the plans never materialised. In 1950, the main pool at the Pells was renovated and the disused free pool turned into the lawn which exists today.

Prior to the 1950s, the Pool had been surrounded by grass, and the land around would be muddy. And before the filtration system was installed in the late 1950s, the water was green and dark, which made young children learning to swim in the pool sometimes reluctant to enter the water. However, schools around the area continued to use the pool for swimming lessons. Later that decade, sun terraces were added, plus more changing rooms, and the current kiosk built in 1960. So by the time the Pells centenary was celebrated in 1961, the Chairman of the Parks Committee, Anne Dumbrell, could boast that the Pells was “one of the most pleasant inland open-air baths in this part of the country”. The Centenary programme reveals that in 1961, the season ran from 1 May to 30 September and the pool opened weekdays, Saturdays and bank holidays. It was open from 9am-8pm, although it closed for lunch 1pm-2pm. Season tickets cost 20 shillings (£1) for adults, 10 shillings for juniors (50p). Day tickets were 1 shilling (5p), and 4d (1.66p) for juniors. Spectators also paid 4d and towels, costumes and caps could be hired.

The District Council took over the pool in 1974 as local government reorganisation took effect. In the late 1980s, the Pells was again at risk of closure with the baths due to be sold in 1991 to help finance the building of the new Lewes Leisure Centre, which would give the town its first indoor swimming pool. The District Council suggested that the indoor swimming provided would make the Pells redundant. But there was a public outcry at the proposal with a 4,000-strong petition organised by the Save the Pells Pool Campaign and the discovery that John Rowe's 1603 gifting of the land prevented it being sold for development. Continued vigorous campaigning and well-attended annual town meetings throughout the 1990s kept the pool open. In 1999 a petition was raised with 4,000 signatures against proposals for the pool to be closed and a skateboard park built on the site. As a consequence the District Council ran the pool for a further season with the agreement that a community organisation was formed to operate the pool in the long term.

In 2000, the Lewes Town Council took up the trusteeship of the Town Brook trust from the District Council. A charity – the Pells Pool Community Association – was formed and took over the running of the pool on 26 May 2001, nearly 140 years to the day since the Pool opened. The Town Council contributed £10,000 per year for three years; later this budget was extended indefinitely.

Investment in the pool has continued through support from the Town Council, local sponsors and strong support from the local community, and developments include extensive new pipework, repairs to the pool itself, paving and tiling, disabled toilets, changing rooms and new pumps. One important effect has been to ensure the temperature of the pool is significantly warmer than before – since as water was lost each day through cracks in the pool tank, it had to be topped up each day with fresh (and cold) water from the underground spring.

The Pells Pool celebrated its 150th anniversary in 2011. Plans for the future development of the Pells, including a redeveloped kiosk, are envisaged, pending planning decisions being made about the redevelopment of the adjoining North Street Quarter. Those plans would place the Pells Pool itself inside the flood defences for the wider area, and allow for physical development of the pool to be undertaken with greater confidence. With the increasing popularity of open water swimming for exercise and health, the pool introduced early morning opening times during weekdays in 2015, returning closer to the original 1860s pattern of morning through to evening opening times.

The Pells Pool was announced as a finalist in the category Sussex Visitor Attraction in the Sussex Life magazine awards in October 2015. In the 2017 season, a refurbished paddling pool was opened and the Pells trialled an autumn season, running to mid-October, and this operated fully in 2018. The 2018 season, starting in early May and finishing in mid-October, was thus the longest season at the Pells since before the second world war, and in 2019 opening was extended further to the end of October, which has continued each year since. The Pool hosted its first writer-in-residence in the 2017 season, and its first artist-in-residence in 2019.

Due to national Covid-19 restrictions in England, the 2020 season did not start until Saturday 25 July 2020 but then ran daily until as late as 1 November in that year. For the first time, a booking system was put in place to manage access to the pool, and this was retained for the 2021 season which started on 8 May 2021.
