= Anne of Cleves House =

Building in Lewes, East Sussex, England

Coordinates: 50°52′8.7″N 0°0′16.6″E

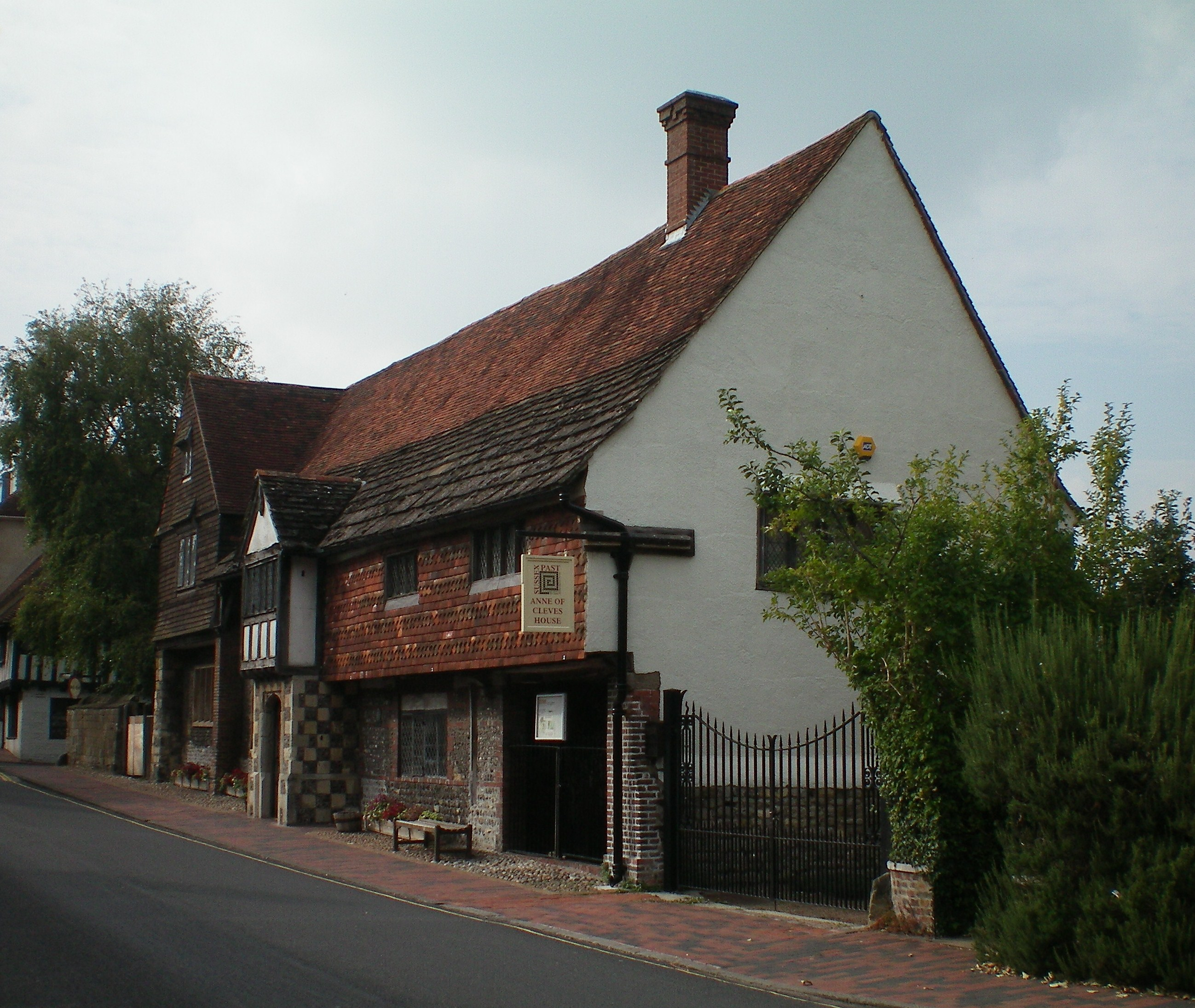
Anne of Cleves House.

Anne of Cleves House is a 16th-century timber-framed Wealden hall house located in Lewes, East Sussex, England. It formed part of Queen Anne's annulment settlement from King Henry VIII in 1541, although she never visited the property. It was restored by the architect Walter Godfrey.

Owned and operated as a museum by the Sussex Archaeological Society under the operating name "Sussex Past", it is home to wide-ranging collections of furniture and artefacts of Sussex interest. These include one of the best exhibitions on wealden iron making including large machinery such as a hammer from Etchingham Forge and cannon boring apparatus together with a collection of iron fire backs. The bedroom and kitchen are furnished to resemble their appearance at the time of Anne's ownership. The house is open to the public and plays host to functions throughout the year, including parties, weddings and small informal concerts.
