= East Sussex County Council elections =

Local government elections in East Sussex, England

East Sussex County Council in England is elected every four years.

== Council composition ==
Composition of the council
Year	Conservative	Labour	Liberal Democrats (Note: Includes totals for the predecessors of the Liberal Democrats, the Liberal Party and SDP (both of which participated in the Alliance).)	Green	Reform UK	UKIP	Independents & Others	Council control after election
Local government reorganisation; council established (84 seats)
1973	49	19	9	–	–	–	7	Conservative
1977	74	5	2	0	–	–	3	Conservative
1981	53	14	15	0	–	–	2	Conservative
New division boundaries (70 seats)
1985	35	14	21	0	–	–	0	No overall control
1989	38	17	15	0	–	–	0	Conservative
1993	22	18	30	0	–	–	0	No overall control
Brighton and Hove become a merged unitary authority (44 seats)
1997	21	7	16	0	–	0	0	No overall control
2001	24	7	13	0	–	0	0	Conservative
New division boundaries (49 seats)
2005	29	5	14	0	–	0	1	Conservative
2009	29	4	13	0	–	0	3	Conservative
2013	20	7	10	0	–	7	5	No overall control
New division boundaries (50 seats)
2017	30	4	11	0	–	0	5	Conservative
2021	27	5	11	4	0	0	3	Conservative
2026 (Note: Delayed from 2025.)	3	0	13	11	22	0	1	No overall control

== County result maps ==
2005 results map

2009 results map

2013 results map

2017 results map

2021 results map

2026 results map

== By-election results ==
=== 1989–1993 ===
Brighton Kingscliff By-Election 17 December 1992
Party	Candidate	Votes	%	±%
Conservative	Simon Radford-Kirby	990	49.0	
Labour	John Stevens	923	45.7	
Liberal Democrats	Martin Jones	108	5.3	
Majority		67	3.3	
Turnout		2,021		
Conservative gain from Labour		Swing		

=== 1993–1997 ===
Cavendish By-Election 20 June 1996
Party	Candidate	Votes	%	±%
Liberal Democrats		1,198	58.9	
Conservative		530	26.1	
Labour		305	15.0	
Majority		668	32.8	
Turnout		2,033	24.4	
Liberal Democrats hold		Swing		

=== 1997–2001 ===
Hollington & Ashdown By-Election 13 November 1997
Party	Candidate	Votes	%	±%
Labour		798	53.4	+15.4
Conservative		358	24.0	−4.3
Liberal Democrats		337	22.6	−11.1
Majority		440	29.4	
Turnout		1,493	15.5	
Labour hold		Swing		

Broomgrove & Ore By-Election 7 May 1998
Party	Candidate	Votes	%	±%
Labour		885	59.5	+15.7
Liberal Democrats		343	23.1	−6.9
Conservative		259	17.4	−5.5
Majority		542	36.4	
Turnout		1,487		
Labour hold		Swing		

Hellingly By-Election 6 May 1999
Party	Candidate	Votes	%	±%
Liberal Democrats		1,786	54.8	+12.5
Conservative		1,476	45.2	+2.1
Majority		310	9.6	
Turnout		3,262		
Liberal Democrats gain from Conservative		Swing		

Peacehaven By-Election 21 October 1999
Party	Candidate	Votes	%	±%
Conservative		1,027	43.9	+5.4
Labour		773	33.0	+1.2
Liberal Democrats		542	23.1	−6.5
Majority		254	10.9	
Turnout		2,342	22.7	
Conservative hold		Swing		

=== 2001–2005 ===
Bexhill East By-Election 9 September 2004
Party	Candidate	Votes	%	±%
Conservative	Martin Kenward	1,117	61.6	+19.6
Liberal Democrats		695	38.4	+14.7
Majority		422	23.2	
Turnout		1,812	23.7	
Conservative hold		Swing		

=== 2005–2009 ===
Pevensey and Westham By-Election 29 September 2005
Party	Candidate	Votes	%	±%
Conservative	Simon Radford-Kirby	1,293	70.0	+20.1
Liberal Democrats	Cynthia Dewick	406	22.0	−10.6
Labour	Robert Walker	147	8.0	−9.5
Majority		887	48.0	
Turnout		1,846	25.7	
Conservative hold		Swing	+15.4%	

Bexhill King Offa By-Election 12 June 2008
Party	Candidate	Votes	%	±%
Conservative	Michael Ensor	2,825	62.3	+23.1
Liberal Democrats	John Kemp	1,191	26.3	−4.3
Labour	Timothy Macpherson	518	11.4	−18.8
Majority		1,634	36.0	
Turnout		4,534	25.0	
Conservative hold		Swing		

=== 2013–2017 ===
Old Hastings and Tressell By-Election 9 July 2015
Party	Candidate	Votes	%	±%
Labour	Tania Charman	961	56.5	+7.3
Conservative	Robert Cooke	368	21.6	+6.0
UKIP	Sebastian Norton	174	10.2	−12.3
Green	Andrea Needham	149	8.8	+0.5
Liberal Democrats	Stewart Rayment	48	2.8	−1.6
Majority		593	34.9	
Turnout		1,700		
Labour hold		Swing		

St Helens and Silverhill By-Election 5 May 2016
Party	Candidate	Votes	%	±%
Labour	Judy Rogers	1,441	46.2	+5.4
Conservative	Martin Clarke	1,253	40.2	+6.7
Green	Julie Hilton	214	6.9	+3.3
Liberal Democrats	Stewart Rayment	212	6.8	+3.3
Majority		188	6.0	
Turnout		3,120		
Labour hold		Swing		

=== 2017–2021 ===
Bexhill West By-Election 10 January 2019
Party	Candidate	Votes	%	±%
Independent	Deirdre Earl-Williams	1,761	51.9	+51.9
Conservative	Martin Kenward	1,071	31.6	−1.7
Liberal Democrats	Richard Thomas	261	7.7	+2.1
Labour	Jacque Walker	111	3.3	−3.8
Green	Polly Gray	107	3.2	+3.2
UKIP	Geoffrey Bastin	81	2.4	−1.2
Majority		690	20.3	
Turnout		3,392		
Independent hold		Swing		

=== 2021–2026 ===
Heathfield and Mayfield By-Election 27 July 2023
Party	Candidate	Votes	%	±%
Green	Anne Cross	1,373	61.5	+43.0
Conservative	Neil Waller	858	38.5	−20.7
Majority		515	23.0	
Turnout		2,231		
Green gain from Conservative		Swing		

Meads By-Election 3 August 2023
Party	Candidate	Votes	%	±%
Liberal Democrats	Brett Wright	1,649	50.1	+10.1
Conservative	Nicholas Taylor	1,361	41.3	−4.3
Labour	David Mannion	157	4.8	−1.1
Green	Claire Martin	127	3.9	−2.2
Majority		288	8.7	
Turnout		3,294		
Liberal Democrats gain from Conservative		Swing		

Ashdown and Conquest By-Election 20 November 2025
Party	Candidate	Votes	%	±%
Reform	Aidan Fisher	797	32.2	+32.2
Green	Paula Warne	607	24.5	+16.4
Conservative	Caroline Kerswell	494	19.9	−39.9
Labour	Amanda Pollard	395	15.9	−7.5
Liberal Democrats	Martin Griffiths	129	5.2	−3.5
Independent	Ricky Hodges	55	2.2	+2.2
Majority		190	7.7	
Turnout		2,477		
Reform gain from Conservative		Swing		

== See also ==
- 1985 East Sussex County Council election
- 1989 East Sussex County Council election
- 2005 East Sussex County Council election (boundary changes increased the number of seats by 5)
- 2009 East Sussex County Council election
- 2013 East Sussex County Council election
- 2017 East Sussex County Council election (boundary changes increased the number of seats by 1)
- 2021 East Sussex County Council election
- 2026 East Sussex County Council election (delayed due to local government reorganisation)
