= 1985 East Sussex County Council election =

1985 UK local government election

← 1981	2 May 1985	1989 →

All 70 seats to East Sussex County Council 36 seats needed for a majority
- Registered: 526,090
- Turnout: 41.6%

	First party	Second party
Party	Conservative	Alliance
Seats won	35	21
Seat change	▼18	▲6
Popular vote	92,754	72,229
Percentage	42.4%	33.0%
	Third party	Fourth party
Party	Labour	Independent
Seats won	14	0
Seat change	Steady	▼2
Popular vote	48,637	1,350
Percentage	22.2%	0.6%
- Results map of the 1985 East Sussex County Council election.
Council control before election
Conservative
Council control after election
No overall control

The 1985 East Sussex County Council election took place on 2 May 1985 to elect members to East Sussex County Council in East Sussex, England. This was on the same day as other local elections.

== Summary ==
=== Election result ===
1985 East Sussex County Council election
Party	Candidates	Seats	Gains	Losses	Net gain/loss	Seats %	Votes %	Votes	+/−
Conservative	67	35	0	5	▼18	50.0	42.4	92,754	
Alliance	65	21	3	2	▲6	30.0	33.0	72,229	
Labour	60	14	4	0	Steady	20.0	22.2	48,637	
Residents	2	0	0	0	Steady	0.0	1.0	2,195	
Independent	5	0	0	0	▼2	0.0	0.6	1,350	
Ecology	10	0	0	0	Steady	0.0	0.6	1,217	
Ind. Conservative	1	0	0	0	Steady	0.0	0.2	352	

== Division results by local authority ==
=== Brighton ===
Brighton District Summary
Party	Seats	+/-	Votes	%	+/-
Labour	10		21,487	43.6	
Conservative	4		17,338	35.2	
Alliance	1		10,099	20.5	
Ecology	0		323	0.7	
Independent	0		19	<0.1	
Total	15		49,266	44.2	
Registered electors			111,337	–	

Division results

Hanover
Party	Candidate	Votes	%	±%
Labour	Roderick Fitch*	2,282	55.5	+24.6
Alliance	K. Harwood	1,353	32.9	–24.0
Conservative	J. Slaughter	369	9.0	–3.2
Ecology	David Aherne	108	2.6	N/A
Majority		929	22.6	N/A
Turnout		4,112	47.4	–11.1
Registered electors		8,668		
Labour gain from Alliance				

Hollingbury
Party	Candidate	Votes	%	±%
Labour	J. Robson	1,846	57.2	+4.6
Conservative	L. Watts	887	27.5	–8.7
Alliance	T. Hunter	495	15.3	+4.0
Majority		959	29.7	+13.3
Turnout		3,228	42.1	–4.5
Registered electors		7,668		
Labour hold		Swing	▲6.7	

Kings Cliff
Party	Candidate	Votes	%	±%
Labour	H. Spillman*	1,562	50.2	+7.1
Conservative	F. Deen	1,160	37.3	–12.9
Alliance	M. Dennis	388	12.5	+5.8
Majority		402	12.9	N/A
Turnout		3,110	46.7	–1.9
Registered electors		6,664		
Labour gain from Conservative		Swing	▲10.0	

Marine
Party	Candidate	Votes	%
Labour	D. Turner*	1,810	51.3
Conservative	G. Machen	1,375	39.0
Alliance	K. Butcher	343	9.7
Majority		435	12.3
Turnout		3,528	45.9
Registered electors		7,694	
Labour win (new seat)			

Moulsecoomb
Party	Candidate	Votes	%
Labour	E. Watson	1,508	63.1
Conservative	J. Stevens	621	26.0
Alliance	B. Meads	261	10.9
Majority		887	37.1
Turnout		2,390	32.3
Registered electors		7,390	
Labour win (new seat)			

Patcham
Party	Candidate	Votes	%	±%
Conservative	G. Theobald	2,029	53.4	–4.6
Labour	W. Scrace	1,144	30.1	+5.0
Alliance	N. Cook	629	16.5	–0.5
Majority		885	23.3	–9.6
Turnout		3,802	53.0	+11.1
Registered electors		7,180		
Conservative hold		Swing	▼4.8	

Queens Park
Party	Candidate	Votes	%	±%
Labour	K. Bodfish	1,735	56.2	+8.9
Conservative	V. Dew	869	28.2	–14.3
Alliance	A. Saunders	379	12.3	+2.1
Ecology	S. Paskins	102	3.3	N/A
Majority		866	28.1	+23.3
Turnout		3,085	47.4	+2.4
Registered electors		6,515		
Labour hold		Swing	▲11.6	

Regency
Party	Candidate	Votes	%	±%
Labour	S. Cullen	1,346	46.7	+30.1
Conservative	Michael Fabricant	1,135	39.4	–12.1
Alliance	A. Cole	403	14.0	–17.9
Majority		211	7.3	N/A
Turnout		2,884	42.5	+4.1
Registered electors		6,787		
Labour gain from Conservative		Swing	▲21.1	

Rottingdean
Party	Candidate	Votes	%	±%
Conservative	J. Mont	2,365	58.8	–1.7
Alliance	R. Dore	1,337	33.3	+4.1
Labour	B. Jones	319	7.9	–2.4
Majority		1,028	25.6	–5.7
Turnout		4,021	51.9	–1.2
Registered electors		7,754		
Conservative hold		Swing	▼2.9	

Seven Dials
Party	Candidate	Votes	%
Alliance	David Rogers*	1,387	44.5
Labour	F. Tonks	940	30.2
Conservative	P. Mallard	769	24.7
Independent	G. O'Brien	19	0.6
Majority		447	14.3
Turnout		3,115	43.3
Registered electors		7,189	
Alliance win (new seat)			

St Peters
Party	Candidate	Votes	%	±%
Labour	M. Farmer	1,526	45.4	–1.5
Conservative	W. Brandon	880	26.2	–17.0
Alliance	J. Guyer	842	25.1	+15.2
Ecology	R. Nicklin	113	3.4	N/A
Majority		646	19.2	+15.5
Turnout		3,361	46.7	–1.4
Registered electors		7,202		
Labour hold		Swing	▲7.8	

Stanmer
Party	Candidate	Votes	%	±%
Labour	D. Hill*	1,918	58.0	+3.4
Conservative	D. Fairhall	938	28.4	+4.7
Alliance	D. McBeth	451	13.6	–8.1
Majority		980	29.6	N/A
Turnout		3,307	42.9	+8.4
Registered electors		7,703		
Labour hold		Swing	▼0.7	

Tenantry
Party	Candidate	Votes	%
Labour	S. Charleton	1,656	59.1
Conservative	J. Payne	697	24.9
Alliance	M. Gare-Simmons	451	16.1
Majority		959	34.2
Turnout		2,804	36.9
Registered electors		7,608	
Labour win (new seat)			

Westdene
Party	Candidate	Votes	%
Conservative	P. Drake*	1,616	51.7
Alliance	D. Roberts	887	28.4
Labour	F. Spicer	624	20.0
Majority		729	23.3
Turnout		3,127	42.3
Registered electors		7,393	
Conservative win (new seat)			

Woodingdean
Party	Candidate	Votes	%
Conservative	B. Thomas	1,628	48.0
Labour	L. Williams	1,271	37.5
Alliance	M. Rutherford	493	14.5
Majority		357	10.5
Turnout		3,392	42.8
Registered electors		7,922	
Conservative win (new seat)			

=== Eastbourne ===
Eastbourne District Summary
Party	Seats	+/-	Votes	%	+/-
Alliance	5		13,687	49.6	
Conservative	3		11,337	41.1	
Labour	0		2,579	9.3	
Total	8		27,603	44.3	
Registered electors			62,355	–	

Division results

Cavendish
Party	Candidate	Votes	%
Alliance	J. Healy*	2,389	65.0
Conservative	E. Etches	924	25.1
Labour	B. Earley	362	9.9
Majority		1,465	39.9
Turnout		3,675	43.3
Registered electors		8,487	
Alliance win (new seat)			

College
Party	Candidate	Votes	%
Conservative	A. Vickers*	2,470	76.5
Alliance	P. Nicholls	758	23.5
Majority		1,712	53.0
Turnout		3,228	42.2
Registered electors		7,654	
Conservative win (new seat)			

Old Town
Party	Candidate	Votes	%
Alliance	M. Skilton	2,100	56.9
Conservative	D. Townsend	1,234	33.4
Labour	D. Evans	358	9.7
Majority		866	23.5
Turnout		3,692	46.9
Registered electors		7,874	
Alliance win (new seat)			

Park
Party	Candidate	Votes	%
Alliance	P. Hearn*	1,510	44.7
Labour	P. Day	1,271	37.7
Conservative	E. Juniper	594	17.6
Majority		239	7.1
Turnout		3,375	43.9
Registered electors		7,692	
Alliance win (new seat)			

Princes
Party	Candidate	Votes	%
Alliance	J. Grist	1,684	52.2
Conservative	C. Butler	1,171	36.3
Labour	M. Kidd	369	11.4
Majority		513	15.9
Turnout		3,224	45.0
Registered electors		7,162	
Alliance win (new seat)			

Priory
Party	Candidate	Votes	%
Alliance	D. Tutt*	2,405	68.1
Conservative	J. Waghorne	906	25.7
Labour	H. Turner	219	6.2
Majority		1,499	42.5
Turnout		3,530	44.9
Registered electors		7,870	
Alliance win (new seat)			

St Marys
Party	Candidate	Votes	%
Conservative	U. Gardner*	1,747	61.3
Alliance	P. Durrant	1,103	38.7
Majority		644	22.6
Turnout		2,850	36.8
Registered electors		7,752	
Conservative win (new seat)			

Woodlands
Party	Candidate	Votes	%
Conservative	M. Tunwell*	2,291	56.9
Alliance	Theresia Williamson	1,738	43.1
Majority		553	13.7
Turnout		4,029	51.2
Registered electors		7,864	
Conservative win (new seat)			

=== Hastings ===
Hastings District Summary
Party	Seats	+/-	Votes	%	+/-
Alliance	5		8,355	42.4	
Labour	1		5,854	29.7	
Conservative	1		5,325	27.0	
Ecology	0		111	0.6	
Independent	0		72	0.4	
Total	7		19,717	36.8	
Registered electors			53,575	–	

Division results

Braybrooke & Castle
Party	Candidate	Votes	%
Alliance	Pam Brown*	1,316	53.1
Conservative	F. Parrott	631	25.5
Labour	J. Dawes	531	21.4
Majority		685	27.6
Turnout		2,478	35.1
Registered electors		7,052	
Alliance win (new seat)			

Broomgrove & Ore
Party	Candidate	Votes	%
Alliance	C. Bourner	1,472	48.0
Labour	Richard Stevens	1,028	33.6
Conservative	J. Marshall	564	18.4
Majority		444	14.5
Turnout		3,064	40.6
Registered electors		7,540	
Alliance win (new seat)			

Central St Leonards & Gensing
Party	Candidate	Votes	%
Alliance	Jane Amstad	1,157	43.5
Conservative	F. Wenham*	918	34.5
Labour	Charles Clark	403	15.1
Ecology	P. Buswell	111	4.2
Independent	J. Wheatley	72	2.7
Majority		239	9.0
Turnout		2,661	35.1
Registered electors		7,573	
Alliance win (new seat)			

Hollington & Ashdown
Party	Candidate	Votes	%
Labour	Michael Foster*	1,420	49.1
Conservative	J. Holden	818	28.3
Alliance	D. Simpson	655	22.6
Majority		602	20.8
Turnout		2,893	40.8
Registered electors		7,090	
Labour win (new seat)			

Old Hastings & Mount Pleasant
Party	Candidate	Votes	%
Alliance	M. Hall	1,336	42.2
Labour	T. Soan	953	30.1
Conservative	J. Clayton	879	27.7
Majority		383	12.1
Turnout		3,168	41.6
Registered electors		7,607	
Alliance win (new seat)			

Silverhill & Wishing Tree
Party	Candidate	Votes	%
Alliance	Paul Smith*	1,697	61.2
Labour	H. Duale	1,078	38.8
Majority		619	22.3
Turnout		2,775	32.9
Registered electors		8,424	
Alliance win (new seat)			

West St Leonards & Maze Hill
Party	Candidate	Votes	%
Conservative	J. Hodgson*	1,515	56.6
Alliance	C. Hughes	722	27.0
Labour	S. Nester	441	16.5
Majority		793	29.6
Turnout		2,678	32.3
Registered electors		8,289	
Conservative win (new seat)			

=== Hove ===
Hove District Summary
Party	Seats	+/-	Votes	%	+/-
Conservative	6		11,831	44.3	
Alliance	2		7,800	29.2	
Labour	2		6,591	24.7	
Ind. Conservative	0		352	1.3	
Ecology	0		112	0.4	
Total	10		26,686	36.9	
Registered electors			72,348	–	

Division results

Brunswick & Adelaide
Party	Candidate	Votes	%
Alliance	B. Bailey*	1,888	65.0
Conservative	S. Gillies	426	14.7
Ind. Conservative	B. Dunmore	352	12.1
Labour	D. Robinson	239	8.2
Majority		1,462	50.3
Turnout		2,905	37.1
Registered electors		7,821	
Alliance win (new seat)			

Goldsmid
Party	Candidate	Votes	%	±%
Conservative	A. White*	1,592	59.8	–12.2
Alliance	R. Bates	634	23.8	+8.8
Labour	A. Richards	434	16.3	+3.3
Majority		958	36.0	–21.1
Turnout		2,660	34.9	+2.2
Registered electors		7,632		
Conservative hold		Swing	▼10.5	

Hangleton
Party	Candidate	Votes	%	±%
Conservative	W. Williams*	1,037	47.9	–0.8
Labour	M. Robinson	736	34.0	–3.4
Alliance	C. Furness	390	18.0	+4.1
Majority		301	13.9	+2.7
Turnout		2,163	30.9	–3.2
Registered electors		7,010		
Conservative hold		Swing	▼1.3	

Nevill
Party	Candidate	Votes	%
Conservative	J. Marshall*	1,599	65.1
Labour	G. Earl	466	19.0
Alliance	A. Gale	391	15.9
Majority		1,133	46.1
Turnout		2,456	36.7
Registered electors		6,698	
Conservative win (new seat)			

Portslade North
Party	Candidate	Votes	%	±%
Labour	L. Hamilton*	1,631	61.9	–3.6
Conservative	A. Burton	735	27.9	±0.0
Alliance	D. Hirst	269	10.2	+4.4
Majority		896	34.0	–3.7
Turnout		2,635	37.8	–7.7
Registered electors		6,962		
Labour hold		Swing	▼1.8	

Portslade South
Party	Candidate	Votes	%	±%
Labour	Donald Turner	1,252	40.0	+13.2
Alliance	Mathew Huntbach	950	30.3	–15.7
Conservative	B. Greenway	931	29.7	+3.5
Majority		302	9.6	N/A
Turnout		3,133	43.0	–3.5
Registered electors		7,289		
Labour gain from Alliance		Swing	▲14.5	

Stanford
Party	Candidate	Votes	%	±%
Conservative	C. Exley	1,725	73.1	–9.9
Alliance	S. Bucknall	463	19.6	+8.1
Labour	J. Stacey	173	7.3	+1.8
Majority		1,262	53.5	–18.0
Turnout		2,361	35.0	–5.1
Registered electors		6,754		
Conservative hold		Swing	▼9.0	

Vallance
Party	Candidate	Votes	%	±%
Conservative	S. Stevens	1,294	51.2	–12.2
Labour	C. Hopper	752	29.8	+14.0
Alliance	R. Bagnall	435	17.2	–3.6
Ecology	A. Sparkes	45	1.8	N/A
Majority		542	21.5	–21.1
Turnout		2,526	33.9	+0.9
Registered electors		7,447		
Conservative hold		Swing	▼13.1	

Westbourne
Party	Candidate	Votes	%	±%
Alliance	M. Randall	1,587	48.7	+33.2
Conservative	R. Ireland*	1,241	38.0	–26.3
Labour	J. Naysmith	367	11.3	–8.9
Ecology	M. Dixon	67	2.1	N/A
Majority		346	10.6	N/A
Turnout		3,262	43.6	+8.5
Registered electors		7,489		
Alliance gain from Conservative		Swing	▲29.8	

Wish
Party	Candidate	Votes	%	±%
Conservative	A. Rowe	1,251	48.4	–23.2
Alliance	A. Percy	793	30.7	+16.5
Labour	I. Caplin	541	20.9	+6.7
Majority		458	17.7	–39.7
Turnout		2,585	35.7	–3.5
Registered electors		7,246		
Conservative hold		Swing	▼19.9	

=== Lewes ===
Lewes District Summary
Party	Seats	+/-	Votes	%	+/-
Conservative	5		12,363	41.6	
Alliance	3		10,968	36.9	
Labour	0		5,186	17.5	
Ecology	0		671	2.3	
Independent	0		523	1.8	
Total	8		29,711	45.4	
Registered electors			65,399	–	

Division results

Chailey
Party	Candidate	Votes	%
Conservative	S. Whitley	1,854	56.0
Alliance	P. Ebert	1,454	44.0
Majority		400	12.1
Turnout		3,308	38.2
Registered electors		8,649	
Conservative win (new seat)			

Lewes
Party	Candidate	Votes	%
Alliance	D. Venables	1,713	34.7
Conservative	D. Monnington*	1,491	30.2
Labour	J. Jacobs	1,486	30.1
Ecology	G. Taylor	241	4.9
Majority		222	4.5
Turnout		4,931	61.1
Registered electors		8,073	
Alliance win (new seat)			

Newhaven
Party	Candidate	Votes	%	±%
Conservative	P. Harwood	1,451	43.7	+1.1
Labour	L. Lamont	1,246	37.5	–4.6
Alliance	R. Philp	470	14.2	–1.2
Independent	P. Allen	153	4.6	N/A
Majority		205	6.2	+5.7
Turnout		3,320	43.0	+4.1
Registered electors		7,722		
Conservative hold		Swing	▲2.9	

Peacehaven
Party	Candidate	Votes	%	±%
Conservative	L. Vince	1,586	42.5	–4.2
Alliance	G. Wagstaff	1,074	28.8	+13.3
Labour	R. Weatherhead	1,069	28.7	–9.1
Majority		512	13.7	+4.8
Turnout		3,729	38.9	+0.9
Registered electors		9,575		
Conservative hold		Swing	▼8.8	

Ringmer
Party	Candidate	Votes	%
Alliance	David Bellotti*	2,609	57.9
Conservative	R. Vigars	1,175	26.1
Labour	M. Woodling	582	12.9
Ecology	J. Denis	142	3.1
Majority		1,434	31.8
Turnout		4,508	56.1
Registered electors		8,033	
Alliance win (new seat)			

Seaford (Blatchington)
Party	Candidate	Votes	%	±%
Alliance	J. Martin	1,774	52.2	+23.8
Conservative	L. Preddy*	1,627	47.8	–11.5
Majority		147	4.3	N/A
Turnout		3,401	42.4	–0.4
Registered electors		8,024		
Alliance gain from Conservative		Swing	▲17.7	

Seaford (Sutton)
Party	Candidate	Votes	%	±%
Conservative	N. Mackilligin*	1,755	49.9	–9.9
Alliance	A. Stiles	962	27.3	–1.3
Independent	L. Williams	370	10.5	N/A
Labour	Alison Chapman	298	8.5	–3.0
Ecology	A. Long	133	3.8	N/A
Majority		793	22.5	–8.7
Turnout		3,518	45.4	+1.0
Registered electors		7,743		
Conservative hold		Swing	▼4.3	

Telscombe
Party	Candidate	Votes	%	±%
Conservative	J. Lovill*	1,424	47.5	–8.1
Alliance	P. Cook	912	30.4	+10.7
Labour	T. Mayo	505	16.9	–7.8
Ecology	M. Ryle	155	5.2	N/A
Majority		512	17.1	–13.8
Turnout		2,996	39.5	–3.4
Registered electors		7,580		
Conservative hold		Swing	▼9.4	

=== Rother ===
Rother District Summary
Party	Seats	+/-	Votes	%	+/-
Conservative	5		14,548	53.5	
Alliance	2		7,148	26.3	
Labour	1		3,445	12.7	
Residents	0		1,298	4.8	
Independent	0		736	2.7	
Total	8		27,175	42.7	
Registered electors			63,647	–	

Division results

Battle
Party	Candidate	Votes	%	±%
Alliance	David Amies*	1,960	53.3	+1.8
Conservative	A. Robertson	1,718	46.7	–1.8
Majority		242	6.6	+3.6
Turnout		3,678	47.4	+3.4
Registered electors		7,763		
Alliance hold		Swing	▲1.8	

Bexhill East
Party	Candidate	Votes	%	±%
Conservative	D. Kimber*	1,344	47.0	+1.1
Residents	M .Traice	1,298	45.4	+0.9
Labour	S. Tickner	220	7.7	–2.0
Majority		46	1.6	+0.2
Turnout		2,862	40.2	–6.1
Registered electors		7,119		
Conservative hold		Swing	▲0.1	

Bexhill North
Party	Candidate	Votes	%	±%
Labour	A. Ottley	1,628	57.1	–10.3
Conservative	E. Nichols	1,221	42.9	+10.3
Majority		407	14.3	–20.6
Turnout		2,849	37.7	–8.2
Registered electors		7,555		
Labour hold		Swing	▼10.3	

Bexhill South
Party	Candidate	Votes	%	±%
Conservative	E. Prior	2,310	66.5	–3.3
Independent	J. Day	736	21.2	N/A
Labour	S. Gover	429	12.3	N/A
Majority		1,574	45.3	+5.7
Turnout		3,47	42.0	+0.7
Registered electors		8,283		
Conservative hold				

Bexhill West
Party	Candidate	Votes	%	±%
Conservative	I. Brampton*	2,474	65.6	–1.6
Alliance	M. Johnson	1,011	26.8	N/A
Labour	M. Alexander	288	7.6	N/A
Majority		1,463	38.8	+4.4
Turnout		3,773	44.4	–8.3
Registered electors		8,507		
Conservative hold				

Rye
Party	Candidate	Votes	%	±%
Conservative	Joan Yates*	2,015	57.2	–12.4
Alliance	D. Goggin	1,013	28.8	N/A
Labour	S. Ungar	495	14.1	N/A
Majority		1,002	28.4	–10.7
Turnout		3,523	44.4	+6.2
Registered electors		7,929		
Conservative hold				

Ticehurst
Party	Candidate	Votes	%	±%
Alliance	Ann Moore*	1,960	54.4	+19.2
Conservative	J. Logan	1,641	45.6	–19.2
Majority		319	8.9	N/A
Turnout		3,601	44.7	+3.9
Registered electors		8,056		
Alliance gain from Conservative		Swing	▲19.2	

Winchelsea
Party	Candidate	Votes	%	±%
Conservative	R. Bramley*	1,825	53.5	–2.9
Alliance	John Lutman	1,204	35.3	–8.3
Labour	B. Champion	385	11.3	N/A
Majority		621	18.2	+5.3
Turnout		3,414	40.5	–2.9
Registered electors		8,435		
Conservative hold		Swing	▲2.7	

=== Wealden ===
Wealden District Summary
Party	Seats	+/-	Votes	%	+/-
Conservative	11		20,012	51.9	
Liberal Democrats	1		14,172	36.7	
Labour	0		3,495	9.1	
Residents	0		897	2.3	
Total	12		38,576	39.6	
Registered electors			97,429	–	

Division results

Buxted & Maresfield
Party	Candidate	Votes	%
Conservative	D. Cumming	1,953	59.9
Alliance	D. Synge	1,082	33.2
Labour	S. Cliff	224	6.9
Majority		871	26.7
Turnout		3,259	37.3
Registered electors		8,733	
Conservative win (new seat)			

Crowborough (Beacon)
Party	Candidate	Votes	%
Conservative	D. Russell*	1,313	47.7
Alliance	Paul Scott	1,173	42.6
Labour	M. Streeter	265	9.6
Majority		140	5.1
Turnout		2,751	34.5
Registered electors		7,976	
Conservative win (new seat)			

Crowborough (Rothersfield)
Party	Candidate	Votes	%
Conservative	F. Edmonds	1,563	50.5
Alliance	P. Whittington	1,299	42.0
Labour	A. Salmon	230	7.4
Majority		264	8.5
Turnout		3,092	36.8
Registered electors		8,400	
Conservative win (new seat)			

Forest Row
Party	Candidate	Votes	%	±%
Conservative	O. Hughes	1,464	55.9	–7.7
Alliance	C. Munday	979	37.4	+11.1
Labour	J. Windebank	178	6.8	–3.3
Majority		485	18.5	–18.8
Turnout		2,621	38.5	–3.9
Registered electors		6,807		
Conservative win (new seat)				

Hailsham
Party	Candidate	Votes	%	±%
Conservative	B. Gray	1,058	46.3	–1.2
Alliance	T. Stanford	699	30.6	+0.7
Labour	D. Rose	528	23.1	+0.5
Majority		359	15.7	–1.9
Turnout		2,285	32.4	–3.5
Registered electors		7,058		
Conservative hold		Swing	▼1.0	

Heathfield
Party	Candidate	Votes	%	±%
Conservative	H. Hatcher	2,317	55.7	–9.1
Alliance	Robert Kiernan	1,530	36.8	+14.2
Labour	B. Waters	313	7.5	–5.1
Majority		787	18.9	–23.2
Turnout		4,160	42.4	+2.1
Registered electors		9,820		
Conservative hold		Swing	▲11.7	

Hellingly
Party	Candidate	Votes	%	±%
Conservative	C. Kelly*	1,417	49.8	–9.1
Alliance	A. Cameron	1,043	36.7	+6.2
Labour	G. Hayward	383	13.5	+2.9
Majority		374	13.2	–3.1
Turnout		2,843	34.9	+4.9
Registered electors		8,153		
Conservative hold		Swing	▼7.7	

Pevensey
Party	Candidate	Votes	%	±%
Conservative	G. Hart*	1,962	55.7	–7.4
Alliance	M. Pensten	1,563	44.3	+16.6
Majority		399	11.3	–24.2
Turnout		3,525	41.4	–1.8
Registered electors		8,523		
Conservative hold		Swing	▼12.0	

Polegate
Party	Candidate	Votes	%	±%
Conservative	C. Brewer	1,240	34.5	–27.8
Alliance	R. Kirtley	1,095	30.5	+10.3
Residents	D. Manton	897	25.0	N/A
Labour	R. Booth	361	10.0	–7.5
Majority		145	4.0	–38.1
Turnout		3,593	44.0	+0.4
Registered electors		8,166		
Conservative hold		Swing	▼19.1	

Uckfield
Party	Candidate	Votes	%	±%
Alliance	M. Wigglesworth*	1,947	51.2	–3.6
Conservative	J. Fordham	1,496	39.3	+2.2
Labour	J. Sones	363	9.5	+1.5
Majority		451	11.8	–6.1
Turnout		3,806	45.8	–1.8
Registered electors		8,307		
Alliance hold		Swing	▼2.9	

Wadhurst
Party	Candidate	Votes	%	±%
Conservative	M. Wright*	1,840	59.3	–2.3
Alliance	J. Brinton	1,008	32.5	+10.8
Labour	D. White	253	8.2	–8.5
Majority		832	26.8	–13.1
Turnout		3,101	41.9	+2.2
Registered electors		7,394		
Conservative hold		Swing	▼6.6	

Willingdon
Party	Candidate	Votes	%	±%
Conservative	J. Chatfield*	2,389	67.5	+1.0
Alliance	H. Gundry	754	21.3	+2.2
Labour	G. Page	397	11.2	+1.3
Majority		1,635	46.2	–1.1
Turnout		3,540	43.7	–3.7
Registered electors		8,092		
Conservative hold		Swing	▼0.6	
