= 2013 East Sussex County Council election =

2013 UK local government election

- 2 May 2013

All 50 seats to East Sussex County Council 26 seats needed for a majority
	First party	Second party
Party	Conservative	Liberal Democrats
Seats won	20	10
Seat change	▼9	▼3
	Third party	Fourth party
Party	UKIP	Labour
Seats won	7	7
Seat change	▲7	▲3
- Map showing the results of the 2013 East Sussex County Council election. Striped electoral divisions have mixed representation.
Council control before election
Conservative
Council control after election
No Overall Control

The East Sussex County Council election, 2013 took place on 2 May 2013 as part of the 2013 United Kingdom local elections. All 49 councillors of East Sussex County Council were elected from 44 electoral divisions, which return either one or two councillors each by first-past-the-post voting for a four-year term of office. The electoral divisions were the same as those used at the previous election in 2009. No elections were held in Brighton and Hove, which is a unitary authority outside the area covered by the County Council.

All locally registered electors (British, Irish, Commonwealth and European Union citizens) who were aged 18 or over on Thursday 2 May 2013 were entitled to vote in the local elections. Those who were temporarily away from their ordinary address (for example, away working, on holiday, in student accommodation or in hospital) were also entitled to vote in the local elections, although those who had moved abroad and registered as overseas electors cannot vote in the local elections. It is possible to register to vote at more than one address (such as a university student who had a term-time address and lives at home during holidays) at the discretion of the local Electoral Register Office, but it remains an offence to vote more than once in the same local government election.

== Summary ==
At this election, the Conservative Party was seeking to retain overall control of the council, previously having a majority of four seats, and the Liberal Democrats to maintain or better their position of 13 seats.

The Conservatives were reduced to 20 seats on the 49-member council, producing no overall control. UKIP made strong gains, winning 7 seats (their first ever seats on the council), and Labour also gained seats (its gain of three seats being wholly at the expense of Conservatives). The number of Independent members increased to 5. Overall, the Liberal Democrats lost three councillors.

Since the election the Conservatives have decided to form a minority administration.

== Election results ==
2013 East Sussex County Council election
Party	Seats	Gains	Losses	Net gain/loss	Seats %	Votes %	Votes	+/−
Conservative	20	0	10	▼10	40.8	31.6	50,325	▼8.3
Liberal Democrats	10	0	2	▼2	20.4	14.8	23,538	▼15.9
UKIP	7	7	0	▲7	14.3	27.3	43,458	▲19.7
Labour	7	3	0	▲3	14.3	14.4	22,962	▲0.3
Independent	5	2	0	▲2	10.2	8.9	14,205	▲2.1
Green	0	0	0	Steady	0.0	3.0	4,824	▼2.2

== Results by electoral division ==
East Sussex includes five districts: Eastbourne borough, Hastings borough, Lewes district, Rother district and Wealden district, and the results are grouped by those districts.

=== Eastbourne ===
Devonshire
Party	Candidate	Votes	%
Liberal Democrats	Steve Wallis	893	39.3
UKIP	Bob Lacey	638	28.1
Labour	Gerry Stonestreet	373	16.4
Conservative	Colin Murdoch	322	14.2
Independent	Keith Gell	48	2.1
Majority			
Turnout		2,274	27.0
Liberal Democrats hold			

Hampden Park
Party	Candidate	Votes	%
Liberal Democrats	Mike Blanch	859	39.8
UKIP	Paul Brown	609	28.2
Conservative	Simon Howe	415	19.2
Labour	Paul Richards	277	12.8
Majority			
Turnout		2,160	29.1
Liberal Democrats hold			

Langney
Party	Candidate	Votes	%
Liberal Democrats	Alan Shuttleworth	1,090	48.6
UKIP	Diane Kefallinos	557	24.8
Labour	Lee Comfort	299	13.3
Conservative	Gordon Jenkins	299	13.3
Majority			
Turnout		2,245	28.5
Liberal Democrats hold			

Meads
Party	Candidate	Votes	%
Conservative	Barry Taylor	1,261	41.0
UKIP	Alan Thornton	855	27.8
Liberal Democrats	Linda Beckmann	510	16.6
Labour	Dennis Scard	279	9.1
Green	Dorothy Forsyth	169	5.5
Majority			
Turnout		3,074	38.1
Conservative hold			

Old Town
Party	Candidate	Votes	%
Liberal Democrats	John Ungar	1,457	42.9
Conservative	Anne Angel	1,054	31.0
UKIP	David Greaves	613	18.0
Labour	Sarah Richards	275	8.1
Majority			
Turnout		3,399	40.6
Liberal Democrats hold			

Ratton
Party	Candidate	Votes	%
Conservative	Colin Belsey	1,224	40.7
UKIP	Roger Stagnell	881	29.3
Liberal Democrats	Neil Stanley	559	18.6
Labour	Anne Grigg	221	7.4
Green	Ann Sterenberg	121	4.0
Majority			
Turnout		3,006	38.7
Conservative hold			

St Anthony's
Party	Candidate	Votes	%
Liberal Democrats	David Tutt	1,304	48.6
UKIP	Christine Woodley	757	28.2
Conservative	Patrick Warner	349	13.0
Labour	Ian Culshaw	199	7.4
Green	Hugh Norris	76	2.8
Majority			
Turnout		2,685	31.8
Liberal Democrats hold			

Sovereign
Party	Candidate	Votes	%
Conservative	David Elkin	1,086	39.2
UKIP	Robert Harper	930	33.6
Liberal Democrats	Steve Holt	531	19.2
Labour	Richard Goude	222	8.0
Majority			
Turnout		2,769	29.9
Conservative hold			

Upperton
Party	Candidate	Votes	%
Liberal Democrats	Pat Rodohan	1,225	40.4
Conservative	Tom Liddiard	981	32.4
UKIP	Amanda Sheehan	591	19.5
Labour	Matthew Quanstrom	235	7.8
Majority			
Turnout		3,032	37.5
Liberal Democrats hold			

=== Hastings ===
Ashdown and Conquest
Party	Candidate	Votes	%
Conservative	Peter Pragnell	1,061	40.0
UKIP	Doug Thorogood	846	31.9
Labour	Stuart Murphy	619	23.3
Liberal Democrats	Paul Burton	128	4.8
Majority			
Turnout		2,654	30.5
Conservative hold			

Baird and Ore
Party	Candidate	Votes	%
Labour	Michael Wincott	872	39.2
Conservative	Liam Atkins	670	30.1
UKIP	Paul Willard	535	24.1
Green	Will Davis	78	3.5
Liberal Democrats	Kate Tudgay	68	3.1
Majority			
Turnout		2,223	30.4
Labour gain from Conservative			

Braybrooke and Castle
Party	Candidate	Votes	%
Labour	Godfrey Daniel	1,396	56.0
UKIP	Jay Lavender	399	16.0
Conservative	Matthew Lock	329	13.2
Green	Maya Evans	255	10.2
Liberal Democrats	Stewart Rayment	113	4.5
Majority			
Turnout		2,492	30.3
Labour hold			

Central St Leonards and Gensing
Party	Candidate	Votes	%
Labour	Trevor Webb	1,020	47.2
UKIP	Michael McIver	452	20.9
Conservative	John Waterfall	349	16.1
Green	Maresa Bossano	228	10.5
Liberal Democrats	Graham Hopgood	113	5.2
Majority			
Turnout		2,162	25.5
Labour hold			

Hollington and Wishing Tree
Party	Candidate	Votes	%
Labour	Phil Scott	1,152	53.1
UKIP	Ken Pankhurst	596	27.5
Conservative	Nigel Barry	322	14.8
Liberal Democrats	Vanessa Burton	99	4.6
Majority			
Turnout		2.169	26.0
Labour hold			

Maze Hill and West St Leonards
Party	Candidate	Votes	%
Labour	Kim Forward	861	35.6
Conservative	Rob Lee	796	32.9
UKIP	Markham Jary	532	22.0
Green	Sarah Evans	130	5.4
Liberal Democrats	Sue Tait	100	4.1
Majority			
Turnout		2,419	29.9
Labour gain from Conservative			

Old Hastings and Tressell
Party	Candidate	Votes	%
Labour	Jeremy Birch	1,076	49.2
UKIP	Peter Wallace	492	22.5
Conservative	Sally-Ann Hart	342	15.6
Green	Sally Phillips	182	8.3
Liberal Democrats	Christopher Dodwell	97	4.4
Majority			
Turnout		2,189	27.8
Labour hold			

St Helens and Silverhill
Party	Candidate	Votes	%
Labour	John Hodges	1,206	40.8
Conservative	Matthew Lock	990	33.5
UKIP	Kara Willard	550	18.6
Green	David Carey-Stuart	107	3.6
Liberal Democrats	Paul Smith	103	3.5
Majority			
Turnout		2,956	39.2
Labour gain from Conservative			

=== Lewes ===
Chailey
Party	Candidate	Votes	%
Conservative	Jim Sheppard	1,621	45.8
Liberal Democrats	Sarah Osborne	812	23.0
UKIP	Tam Large	662	18.7
Green	Alex Luetchford	222	6.3
Labour	George Adsett-Knutsen	219	6.2
Majority			
Turnout		3,536	36.2
Conservative hold			

Lewes
Party	Candidate	Votes	%
Independent	Ruth O'Keeffe	2,385	59.5
Green	Alfie Stirling	592	14.8
Labour	Gaby Weiner	342	8.5
Liberal Democrats	Joyce Bell	305	7.6
UKIP	Donna Edmunds	231	5.8
Conservative	Roy Burman	152	3.8
Majority			
Turnout		4,007	45.2
Independent hold			

Newhaven and Ouse Valley West
Party	Candidate	Votes	%
Liberal Democrats	Carla Butler	784	31.3
UKIP	George Cork	724	28.9
Conservative	Tony Bradbury	540	21.6
Labour	Jan Woodling	317	12.7
Green	Ashley Price	140	5.6
Majority			
Turnout		2,505	30.2
Liberal Democrats hold			

Ouse Valley East
Party	Candidate	Votes	%
UKIP	Peter Charlton	934	31.6
Conservative	Robbie Robertson	663	22.5
Liberal Democrats	Steve Saunders	532	18.0
Independent	Roger Foxwell	486	16.5
Labour	Trevor Hopper	186	6.3
Green	Johnny Denis	151	5.1
Majority			
Turnout		2,952	38.5
UKIP gain from Liberal Democrats			

Peacehaven and Telscombe Towns (2 seats)
Party	Candidate	Votes	%
UKIP	Ian Buchanan	2,236	19.8
UKIP	Phil Howson	2,232	19.8
Conservative	John Livings	2,148	19.0
Conservative	Andy Smith	2,027	18.0
Labour	John Carden	1,119	9.9
Labour	Christine Robinson	1,116	9.9
Green	Adrian Ross	207	1.8
Green	Keith Rapley	199	1.8
Turnout		5,642	33.6
UKIP gain from Conservative			
UKIP gain from Conservative			

Ringmer and Lewes Bridge
Party	Candidate	Votes	%
Liberal Democrats	Rosalyn St Pierre	1,103	32.3
Conservative	Richard Turner	708	20.7
UKIP	Ian Wilson	574	16.8
Independent	Matt Kent	407	11.9
Labour	Louis Blair	326	9.5
Green	Susan Murray	298	8.7
Majority			
Turnout		3,416	37.7
Liberal Democrats hold			

Seaford Blatchington
Party	Candidate	Votes	%
Liberal Democrats	Carolyn Lambert	900	32.1
UKIP	Jeffrey Titford	873	31.2
Conservative	Paul Franklin	702	25.1
Labour	Agnes Wheeler	194	6.9
Green	Roger Murray	133	4.7
Majority			
Turnout		2,802	35.3
Liberal Democrats hold			

Seaford Sutton
Party	Candidate	Votes	%
UKIP	Frank Carstairs	1,189	39.7
Conservative	Sam Adeniji	927	30.9
Liberal Democrats	Eleas Hussain	557	18.6
Labour	Peter Hambly	191	6.4
Green	Patti Broome	133	4.4
Majority			
Turnout		2,997	39.9
UKIP gain from Liberal Democrats			

=== Rother ===
Battle and Crowhurst
Party	Candidate	Votes	%
Liberal Democrats	Kathryn Field	1,131	43.3
Conservative	Pam Doodes	621	23.8
UKIP	Tom Foy	606	23.2
Labour	Tim MacPherson	252	9.7
Majority			
Turnout		2,610	34.9
Liberal Democrats hold			

Bexhill East
Party	Candidate	Votes	%
Independent	Charles Clark	879	35.1
UKIP	Geoffrey Bastin	619	24.8
Conservative	Martin Kenward	472	18.9
Labour	Philipa Coughlan	272	10.9
Liberal Democrats	Vivienne Bond	259	10.4
Majority			
Turnout		2,501	32.8
Independent gain from Conservative			

Bexhill King Offa (2)
Party	Candidate	Votes	%
Conservative	Michael Ensor	1,693	31.8
UKIP	Michael Phillips	1,629	30.6
UKIP	Yvonne Clout	1,529	28.7
Conservative	Joy Hughes	1,445	27.1
Labour	Alan Bearne	1,021	19.2
Labour	Paul Courtel	952	17,9
Independent	Yolanda Laybourne	895	16.8
Independent	Andrew Crotty	723	13.6
Liberal Democrats	Stuart Wood	497	9.3
Liberal Democrats	Tracy Dixon	270	5.1
Turnout		5,327	28.0
Conservative hold			
UKIP gain from Conservative			

Bexhill West
Party	Candidate	Votes	%
Independent	Stuart Earl	1,334	42.6
Conservative	Nichollas Hollingsworth	812	26.0
UKIP	Alf Lovell	720	23.0
Labour	Yvonne Cleland	169	5.4
Liberal Democrats	John Zipperlen	93	3.0
Majority			
Turnout		3,128	39.9
Independent gain from Conservative			

Brede Valley and Marsham
Party	Candidate	Votes	%
Conservative	Carl Maynard	1,195	44.6
UKIP	Cliff Stokes	837	31.3
Labour	Jonathan Lee	503	18.8
Liberal Democrats	Chris Lewcock	142	5.3
Majority			
Turnout		2,677	36.3
Conservative hold			

Northern Rother
Party	Candidate	Votes	%
Conservative	Angharad Davies	1,222	42.7
UKIP	Trevor Gooding	824	28.8
Liberal Democrats	Sue Prochak	818	28.6
Majority			
Turnout		2,864	34.7
Conservative hold			

Rother North West
Party	Candidate	Votes	%
Conservative	John Barnes	1,158	47.0
UKIP	Tony Smith	677	27.5
Liberal Democrats	Steve Barrass	291	11.8
Green	Don Nicholls	170	6.9
Labour	Christoper Husbands	166	6.7
Majority			
Turnout		2,462	32.8
Conservative hold			

Rye and Eastern Rother
Party	Candidate	Votes	%
Conservative	Keith Glazier	963	36.1
UKIP	Michael McKenzie	884	33.2
Labour	Nick Warren	647	24.3
Liberal Democrats	Peter Hillier-Palmer	171	6.4
Majority			
Turnout		2,665	36.2
Conservative hold			

=== Wealden ===
Alfriston, East Hoathly & Hellingly
Party	Candidate	Votes	%
Conservative	Nick Bennett	1,272	38.8
UKIP	Dan Docker	1,131	34.5
Liberal Democrats	Andy Watkins	552	16.8
Labour	Tom Serpell	327	10.0
Majority			
Turnout		3,282	34.2
Conservative hold			

Buxted Maresfield
Party	Candidate	Votes	%
Conservative	Roy Galley	1,478	51.4
UKIP	Tony Robards	845	29.4
Liberal Democrats	Martha Whittle	309	10.7
Labour	Bruce Meredeen	243	8.5
Majority			
Turnout		2,875	32.8
Conservative hold			

Crowborough (2 seats)
Party	Candidate	Votes	%
Conservative	Richard Stogdon	1,866	41.9
Conservative	Sylvia Tidy	1,723	38.6
Independent	Stephen Isted	1,189	26.7
UKIP	Anna-Marie Crampton	1,157	26.0
UKIP	Sonia Finch	1,127	25.3
Labour	Brendan Clegg	469	10.6
Labour	Dave Neeves	393	8.8
Liberal Democrats	Beverley Johnstone	340	7.6
Liberal Democrats	David Shaw	327	7.3
Green	Scott Mason	325	7.3
Turnout		4,458	26.8
Conservative hold			
Conservative hold			

Forest Row
Party	Candidate	Votes	%
Conservative	Francis Whetstone	1,095	39.8
UKIP	Peter Griffiths	795	28.9
Green	Keith Obbard	433	15.7
Liberal Democrats	Chris Rycroft	269	9.8
Labour	Kevin O'Sullivan	158	5.7
Majority			
Turnout		2,750	30.4
Conservative hold			

Framfield and Horam
Party	Candidate	Votes	%
Conservative	Chris Dowling	1,415	48.8
UKIP	Graham Shevill	935	32.2
Labour	Lis Rumbold	276	9.5
Liberal Democrats	Michael Harker	275	9.5
Majority			
Turnout		2,901	32.2
Conservative hold			

Hailsham and Herstmonceux (2 seats)
Party	Candidate	Votes	%
UKIP	Laurence Keeley	1,892	40.4
Conservative	Bill Bentley	1,859	39.7
UKIP	David Younge	1,769	37.7
Conservative	Roger Thomas	1,515	32.3
Liberal Democrats	Paul Holbrook	660	14.1
Labour	Steve Cross	656	14.0
Labour	Roger McCarthy	532	11.3
Liberal Democrats	Graham Morgan	493	10.5
Turnout		4,688	27.2
UKIP gain from Conservative			
Conservative hold			

Heathfield
Party	Candidate	Votes	%
Conservative	Rupert Simmons	1,253	49.7
UKIP	Julie Docker	798	31.6
Labour	Craig Austen-White	265	10.5
Liberal Democrats	Jim Benson	206	8.2
Majority			
Turnout		2,522	30.7
Conservative hold			

Pevensey and Westham
Party	Candidate	Votes	%
UKIP	Mike Pursglove	1,096	43.9
Conservative	Tony Freebody	991	39.7
Labour	Robert Slater	272	10.9
Liberal Democrats	Rachel Hills	136	5.5
Majority			
Turnout		2,495	32.7
UKIP gain from Conservative			

Polegate, Willingdon and East Dean (2 seats)
Party	Candidate	Votes	%
Independent	Stephen Shing	3,066	54.0
Independent	Daniel Shing	2,793	49.2
UKIP	Bernie Goodwin	1,289	22.7
Conservative	Douglas Murray	1,099	19.4
UKIP	Maureen Goodwin	1,047	18.4
Conservative	Simon Popek	875	15.4
Liberal Democrats	Don Broadbent	595	10.5
Liberal Democrats	Rob Slater	356	6.3
Labour	Alex Mthobi	230	4.1
Turnout		5,675	39.2
Independent hold			
Independent hold			

Uckfield
Party	Candidate	Votes	%
Conservative	Claire Dowling	928	32.3
Liberal Democrats	Paul Sparks	880	30.7
UKIP	Mike Mayo	764	26.6
Labour	Chris Horlock	298	10.4
Majority			
Turnout		2,870	32.3
Conservative hold			

Wadhurst
Party	Candidate	Votes	%
Conservative	Bob Standley	2,037	66.9
Green	Jonathan Kent	475	15.6
Labour	Felicity Harvest	269	8.8
Liberal Democrats	Gavin Barrass	266	8.7
Majority			
Turnout		3,047	32.1
Conservative hold			
