= 2021 East Sussex County Council election =

2021 UK local government election

- 4 May 2021

All 50 seats to East Sussex County Council 26 seats needed for a majority

	First party	Second party	Third party
Party	Conservative	Liberal Democrats	Labour
Last election	30 seats, 45.6%	11 seats, 23.8%	4 seats, 14.7%
Seats won	27	11	5
Seat change	▼3	Steady	▲1
Popular vote	67,837	33,692	24,624
Percentage	42.0%	20.9%	15.2%
Swing	▼3.6%	▼1.9%	▲0.5%
	Fourth party	Fifth party
Party	Green	Independent
Last election	0 seats, 5.8%	5 seats, 6.6%
Seats won	4	3
Seat change	▲4	▼2
Popular vote	23,355	10,544
Percentage	14.5%	6.5%
Swing	▲8.7%	▼0.1%
- Map showing the results of the 2021 East Sussex County Council election
Council control before election
Conservative
Council control after election
Conservative

The 2021 East Sussex County Council election took place alongside the other local elections. All 50 seats to East Sussex County Council were up for election.

== Summary ==
=== Election result ===
2021 East Sussex County Council election
Party	Candidates	Seats	Gains	Losses	Net gain/loss	Seats %	Votes %	Votes	+/−
Conservative	50	27	1	4	▼3	54.0	42.0	67,837	–3.6
Liberal Democrats	43	11	1	1	Steady	22.0	20.9	33,692	–1.9
Labour	45	5	2	1	▲1	10.0	15.2	24,624	+0.5
Green	39	4	4	0	▲4	8.0	14.5	23,355	+8.7
Independent	14	3	0	2	▼2	6.0	6.5	10,544	–0.1
UKIP	8	0	0	0	Steady	0.0	0.4	698	–3.2
Reform	4	0	0	0	Steady	0.0	0.2	350	N/A
SDP	1	0	0	0	Steady	0.0	0.1	103	N/A
The Democratic Network	1	0	0	0	Steady	0.0	0.1	99	N/A
Heritage	2	0	0	0	Steady	0.0	<0.1	73	N/A

== Results by Division ==
=== Eastbourne ===
Eastbourne district summary
Party	Seats	+/-	Votes	%	+/-
Liberal Democrat	6	Steady	11,958	43.3	–0.7
Conservative	3	Steady	10,785	39.0	–1.3
Labour	0	Steady	2,497	9.0	+0.4
Green	0	Steady	1,775	6.4	+2.8
UKIP	0	Steady	389	1.4	–2.1
Independent	0	Steady	158	0.6	N/A
Reform UK	0	Steady	58	0.2	N/A
Total	9	Steady	27,620		

Division results

Devonshire
Party	Candidate	Votes	%	±%
Liberal Democrats	Stephen Holt	1,243	44.4	–4.8
Conservative	Nicholas Taylor	747	26.7	+4.0
Labour	Jill Shacklock	453	16.2	+0.2
Green	Sarah Hill	253	9.0	+5.0
UKIP	Lukasz Antoniewski	105	3.7	–4.3
Majority		496	18.6	–7.9
Turnout		2801	27.7	–4.2
Liberal Democrats hold		Swing	4.5	

Hampden Park
Party	Candidate	Votes	%	±%
Liberal Democrats	Colin Swansborough*	956	40.9	–14.1
Conservative	Mozmil Hussain	717	30.7	+4.7
Labour	Margaret Robinson	337	14.4	+0.2
Green	Susan Dixon	169	7.2	+2.3
Independent	Lucette Davies	158	6.8	N/A
Majority		239	10.2	–18.8
Turnout		2337	30.2	+1.4
Liberal Democrats hold		Swing	9.4	

Langney
Party	Candidate	Votes	%	±%
Liberal Democrats	Alan Shuttleworth*	1,490	64.0	–0.4
Conservative	David Small	584	25.1	+3.3
Labour	Graham Dean	136	5.8	+0.2
Green	Donna Lonsdale-O'Brien	65	2.8	+1.1
UKIP	Christopher Holloway	54	2.3	–4.0
Majority		906	38.9	–3.7
Turnout		2329	29.9	–3.1
Liberal Democrats hold		Swing	2.0	

Meads
Party	Candidate	Votes	%	±%
Conservative	Barry Taylor*	1,770	45.6	–14.0
Liberal Democrats	Peter Diplock	1,552	40.0	+15.7
Green	Dorothy Forsyth	235	6.1	+1.1
Labour	Bill Filby	228	5.9	–0.5
Reform	Kayaking Kris Mullens	95	2.4	N/A
Majority		218	5.6	–29.3
Turnout		3880	45.7	+0.7
Conservative hold		Swing	14.8	

Old Town
Party	Candidate	Votes	%	±%
Liberal Democrats	John Ungar*	1,792	49.2	–6.5
Conservative	Robert Findon	1,075	29.5	–0.7
Labour	Jake Lambert	445	12.2	+3.0
Green	Jo Henderson	332	9.1	+4.2
Majority		717	19.7	–4.9
Turnout		3644	43.9	–1.8
Liberal Democrats hold		Swing	2.9	

Ratton
Party	Candidate	Votes	%	±%
Conservative	Colin Belsey*	1,776	56.2	–6.4
Liberal Democrats	Helen Burton	1,027	32.5	+11.3
Labour	Wendy Lambert	219	6.9	–0.9
Green	Holly Atkins	138	4.4	+1.5
Majority		749	23.7	–17.6
Turnout		3160	42.4	–2.2
Conservative hold		Swing	8.8	

St Anthony's
Party	Candidate	Votes	%	±%
Liberal Democrats	David Tutt*	1,440	51.1	–8.4
Conservative	Nick Ansell	961	34.1	+6.6
Labour	Ian Culshaw	188	6.7	+0.5
Green	Becky Gayler	150	5.3	+3.4
UKIP	Colin Horscroft	79	2.8	–2.1
Majority		479	17.0	–15.0
Turnout		2818	33.3	–4.4
Liberal Democrats hold		Swing	7.5	

Sovereign
Party	Candidate	Votes	%	±%
Conservative	Penny Di Cara	2,045	58.7	–5.8
Liberal Democrats	Kathy Ballard	998	28.4	+1.7
Labour	Louis Thorburn	217	6.2	–0.1
Green	James Herbert	149	4.2	+1.5
UKIP	Ian Garbutt	107	3.0	N/A
Majority		1047	29.8	–7.8
Turnout		3516	37.4	+4.8
Conservative hold		Swing	3.7	

Upperton
Party	Candidate	Votes	%	±%
Liberal Democrats	Pat Rodohan*	1,460	45.2	–3.1
Conservative	Nick Henderson	1,110	34.4	–2.7
Green	Alexandra Hough	284	8.8	+4.7
Labour	Paul Richards	274	8.5	+1.4
Reform	Dashiell Bourne	58	1.8	N/A
UKIP	Amanda Sheehan	44	1.4	–2.0
Majority		350	10.8	–0.4
Turnout		3230	38.3	–3.3
Liberal Democrats hold		Swing	0.2	

=== Hastings ===
Hastings district summary
Party	Seats	+/-	Votes	%	+/-
Conservative	4	Steady	9,002	38.9	–1.3
Labour	3	▼1	8,786	37.8	–7.6
Green	1	▲1	4,100	17.7	+11.7
Liberal Democrat	0	Steady	1,281	5.5	–2.4
Total	8	Steady	23,139		

Division results

Ashdown and Conquest
Party	Candidate	Votes	%	±%
Conservative	Peter Pragnell*	1,609	59.8	–2.2
Labour	Judy Rogers	629	23.4	–4.5
Liberal Democrats	Martin Griffiths	235	8.7	+1.3
Green	Christopher Saunders	219	8.7	+5.9
Majority		980	36.4	+2.3
Turnout		2692	43.3	+9.5
Conservative hold		Swing	1.2	

Baird and Ore
Party	Candidate	Votes	%	±%
Conservative	Alan Hay	1,188	48.1	+0.9
Labour	Ali Roark	937	37.9	–6.5
Green	Daniel Hope	268	10.8	+6.9
Liberal Democrats	Robert Wakeford	78	3.2	–1.3
Majority		251	10.2	+7.4
Turnout		2471	38.8	+5.4
Conservative hold		Swing	3.7	

Braybrooke and Castle
Party	Candidate	Votes	%	±%
Labour	Godfrey Daniel*	1,633	49.6	–9.0
Conservative	Lucian Fernando	766	23.3	+1.6
Green	Sally Phillips	693	21.0	+13.0
Liberal Democrats	Katy Hunter-Burbridge	201	6.1	–5.7
Majority		867	26.3	–10.6
Turnout		3293	43.3	+4.8
Labour hold		Swing	5.3	

Central St Leonards and Gensing
Party	Candidate	Votes	%	±%
Labour	Trevor Webb*	1,453	44.8	–8.9
Green	Kenneth Davis	832	25.6	+15.7
Conservative	Graeme Williams	757	23.3	–4.4
Liberal Democrats	Stephen Milton	203	6.3	–2.4
Majority		621	19.1	–6.9
Turnout		3245	39.0	+6.7
Labour hold		Swing	12.3	

Hollington and Wishing Tree
Party	Candidate	Votes	%	±%
Labour	Phil Scott*	1,198	50.4	–5.7
Conservative	Andy Patmore	887	37.3	+2.6
Green	Beccy McCray	190	8.0	+3.5
Liberal Democrats	Emlyn Jones	101	4.3	–0.4
Majority		311	13.1	–8.4
Turnout		2376	34.4	+5.8
Labour hold		Swing	4.2	

Maze Hill and West St Leonards
Party	Candidate	Votes	%	±%
Conservative	Matthew Beaver*	1,447	53.9	+2.2
Labour	Nigel Sinden	707	26.3	–3.7
Green	Samuel Heffernan	354	13.2	+9.7
Liberal Democrats	Stewart Rayment	179	6.7	–3.9
Majority		740	27.5	+5.8
Turnout		2687	45.8	+9.1
Conservative hold		Swing	2.9	

Old Hastings and Tressell
Party	Candidate	Votes	%	±%
Green	Julia Hilton	1,125	37.7	+26.8
Labour	Ruby Cox	1,013	33.9	–20.5
Conservative	Fiona Archbold	757	25.4	–3.1
Liberal Democrats	Gene Saunders	90	3.0	–3.3
Majority		112	3.8	–22.1
Turnout		2985	44.8	+9.5
Green gain from Labour		Swing	23.7	

St Helens and Silverhill
Party	Candidate	Votes	%	±%
Conservative	Sorrell Marlow-Eastwood	1,591	46.9	–3.5
Labour	Margi O'Callaghan	1,186	35.0	–2.7
Green	Dave Carey-Stuart	419	12.4	+8.4
Liberal Democrats	Bob Lloyd	194	5.7	–2.2
Majority		405	11.9	–0.8
Turnout		3390	53.8	+13.0
Conservative hold		Swing	0.4	

=== Lewes ===
Lewes district summary
Party	Seats	+/-	Votes	%	+/-
Liberal Democrats	3	▼1	8,538	25.8	–5.2
Conservative	2	▼2	11,128	33.7	–3.3
Green	2	▲2	7,965	24.1	+15.5
Labour	2	▲2	4,962	15.0	+4.2
Independent	0	▼1	293	0.9	–7.8
UKIP	0	Steady	106	0.3	–3.5
Heritage	0	Steady	73	0.2	N/A
Total	9	Steady	33,065		

Division results

Chailey
Party	Candidate	Votes	%	±%
Conservative	Matthew Milligan	1,627	40.1	–20.1
Green	Zoe Nicholson	1,580	38.9	+32.7
Liberal Democrats	Hazel Fell-Rayner	623	15.4	–8.7
Labour	Nicholas Belcher	186	4.6	–5.0
Heritage	Kizzi Dodd	42	1.0	N/A
Majority		47	1.2	–34.9
Turnout		4058	46.9	+6.2
Conservative hold		Swing	26.4	

Lewes
Party	Candidate	Votes	%	±%
Green	Wendy Maples	2,030	43.4	+36.2
Liberal Democrats	Kate Wood	1,345	28.7	+11.0
Labour	Peter Hambly	763	16.3	+3.0
Conservative	David Charnock	542	11.6	+5.5
Majority		685	14.6	–23.1
Turnout		4680	55.5	+3.0
Green gain from Independent				

The incumbent Independent Ruth O'Keeffe did not stand for re-election.

Newhaven and Bishopstone
Party	Candidate	Votes	%	±%
Liberal Democrats	James MacCleary	1,251	39.5	+0.4
Conservative	Liz Boorman	1,235	39.0	+1.4
Independent	Steve Saunders	238	7.5	N/A
Green	Emily O'Brien	223	7.0	+3.8
Labour	Elaine Sammarco	219	6.9	–3.2
Majority		16	0.5	–0.9
Turnout		3166	36.0	–1.0
Liberal Democrats hold		Swing	0.5	

Ouse Valley West and Downs
Party	Candidate	Votes	%	±%
Liberal Democrats	Sarah Osborne*	1,671	51.1	−0.7
Conservative	Anthony Bradbury	1,108	33.9	−3.8
Green	Paul Keene	285	8.7	+4.4
Labour	David Hallett	209	6.4	+0.2
Majority		563	17.2	+3.1
Turnout		3273	42.6	−0.4
Liberal Democrats hold		Swing	+1.6	

Peacehaven
Party	Candidate	Votes	%	±%
Labour	Chris Collier	1,363	46.5	+19.5
Conservative	Katie Sanderson	1,307	44.6	−9.5
Green	Lesley Orr	100	3.4	+0.5
Liberal Democrats	Kevin West	79	2.7	−1.7
UKIP	Ian Buchanan	51	1.7	−9.9
Heritage	Adam Stratford	31	1.1	N/A
Majority		56	1.9	−25.4
Turnout		2931	34.2	+1.2
Labour gain from Conservative		Swing	14.5	

Ringmer and Lewes Bridge
Party	Candidate	Votes	%	±%
Green	Johnny Denis	2,291	50.5	+19.9
Liberal Democrats	Janet Baah	1,159	25.6	−7.4
Conservative	Richard Turner	844	18.6	−6.1
Labour	Danny Sweeney	240	5.3	−3.8
Majority		1132	25	+22.6
Turnout		4526	50.5	−2.4
Green gain from Liberal Democrats		Swing	13.7	

Seaford North
Party	Candidate	Votes	%	±%
Conservative	Sam Adeniji	1,808	50.4	−0.6
Green	Gemma McFarlane	929	25.9	+22.5
Liberal Democrats	Nazish Adil	532	14.8	−14.1
Labour	Ann Biddle	209	5.8	−1.7
Independent	Phil Boorman*	55	1.5	−49.5
UKIP	Pete Leeming	55	1.5	−5.2
Majority		879	24.5	+2.3
Turnout		3588	41.2	+1.6
Conservative hold		Swing	11.6	

The incumbent Philip Boorman previously stood for the Conservative Party

Seaford South
Party	Candidate	Votes	%	±%
Liberal Democrats	Carolyn Lambert*	1,679	45.8	+0.9
Conservative	Luke Proudfoot	1,303	35.5	−4.7
Labour	Alun Tlusty-Sheen	347	9.5	−2.0
Green	James Meek	338	9.2	+6.4
Majority		376	10.6	+5.6
Turnout		3667	41.1	−1.2
Liberal Democrats hold		Swing	2.8	

Telscombe
Party	Candidate	Votes	%	±%
Labour	Christine Robinson	1,426	45.0	+19.7
Conservative	Andy Smith*	1,354	42.7	−12.5
Liberal Democrats	Simon Ackroyd	199	6.3	−1.5
Green	Anthony Shuster	189	6.0	+2.2
Majority		72	2.3	−27.6
Turnout		3168	34.9	+1.8
Labour gain from Conservative		Swing	16.1	

=== Rother ===
Rother district summary
Party	Seats	+/-	Votes	%	+/-
Conservative	7	▲1	14,139	48.9	–0.3
Independent	1	▼1	5,010	17.3	+5.1
Liberal Democrats	1	Steady	3,214	11.1	–6.0
Labour	0	Steady	4,548	15.7	+0.9
Green	0	Steady	1,831	6.3	+5.6
Democratic Network	0	Steady	99	0.3	N/A
Reform UK	0	Steady	81	0.3	N/A
Total	9	Steady	28,922		

Division results

Battle and Crowhurst
Party	Candidate	Votes	%	±%
Liberal Democrats	Kathryn Field*	1,683	53.3	+5.0
Conservative	Bernard Brown	1,183	37.4	+1.8
Labour	Christopher Husbands	293	9.3	−2.5
Majority		500	15.8	+3.1
Turnout		3159	41.5	+2.1
Liberal Democrats hold		Swing	1.6	

Bexhill East
Party	Candidate	Votes	%	±%
Independent	Charles Clark*	763	29.3	−6.0
Conservative	Martin Kenward	744	28.6	−2.2
Independent	Joanna Brewerton	394	15.1	New
Green	Sue Burton	377	14.5	New
Labour	Jacqueline Walker	323	12.4	−1.5
Majority		19	0.7	−3.8
Turnout		2601	31.1	−1.0
Independent hold		Swing	1.9	

Bexhill North
Party	Candidate	Votes	%	±%
Conservative	Abul Azad	1,597	57.7	+12.9
Labour	Christine Bayliss	907	32.8	+4.8
Liberal Democrats	Jonathan James	265	9.6	+4.5
Majority		690	24.9	+8.1
Turnout		2769	33.6	−0.9
Conservative hold		Swing	4.1	

Bexhill South
Party	Candidate	Votes	%	±%
Conservative	Ian Hollidge	1,405	40.0	−18.5
Labour	Richard Sage	798	22.7	+0.5
Independent	Yolanda Laybourne	720	20.5	New
Independent	Andrew Crotty	392	11.2	New
Independent	Pat Stappleton	194	5.5	New
Majority		607	17.3	−19.0
Turnout		3509	35.7	+1.1
Conservative hold		Swing	9.5	

Bexhill West
Party	Candidate	Votes	%	±%
Conservative	Nuala Geary	1,729	42.8	+9.2
Independent	Deirdre Earl-Williams*	1,389	34.4	−17.4
Labour	John Walker	433	10.7	+3.6
Liberal Democrats	Wendy Dash	386	9.6	+4.0
Democratic Network	Nigel Jacklin	99	2.5	New
Majority		340	8.4	−8.8
Turnout		4036	43.6	−1.6
Conservative gain from Independent		Swing	13.3	

Deirdre Earl-Williams vote share is calculated on the 2019 Bexhill West By-Election that she won following the death of her husband, the former incumbent Stuart Earl.

Brede Valley and Marsham
Party	Candidate	Votes	%	±%
Conservative	Carl Maynard*	1,871	53.4	−13.6
Independent	Beverley Coupar	1,158	33.0	New
Labour	Liam Crowter	394	11.2	−2.5
Reform	Wayne Andrews	81	2.3	New
Majority		713	20.3	−32.9
Turnout		3504	42.7	+5.1
Conservative hold		Swing	23.3	

Northern Rother
Party	Candidate	Votes	%	±%
Conservative	Paul Redstone	1,838	59.7	+0.8
Liberal Democrats	Stephen Hardy	880	28.6	+1.8
Labour	Tim MacPherson	360	11.7	+3.4
Majority		958	31.1	−1.0
Turnout		3078	41.3	+1.4
Conservative hold		Swing	0.5	

Rother North West
Party	Candidate	Votes	%	±%
Conservative	Eleanor Kirby-Green	1,923	65.8	+3.8
Green	Don Nicholls	635	21.7	New
Labour	Joe Roper	364	8.7	−0.6
Majority		1288	44.1	+5.0
Turnout		2922	38.1	+2.3
Conservative hold		Swing	9.0	

Rye and Eastern Rother
Party	Candidate	Votes	%	±%
Conservative	Keith Glazier*	1,849	55.3	−0.2
Green	Dominic Manning	819	24.5	+18.1
Labour	Ash Madden	676	20.2	−0.8
Majority		1030	30.8	−3.7
Turnout		3344	40.8	+3.4
Conservative hold		Swing	9.2	

=== Wealden ===
Wealden district summary
Party	Seats	+/-	Votes	%	+/-
Conservative	11	▼2	22,783	47.0	–7.1
Independent	2	Steady	5,083	10.5	+1.1
Liberal Democrats	1	▲1	8,691	17.9	+1.8
Green	1	▲1	7,684	15.8	+7.3
Labour	0	Steady	3,861	8.0	–0.3
UKIP	0	0	203	0.4	–3.2
SDP	0	Steady	103	0.2	N/A
Total	15	Steady	48,524		

Division results

Arlington, East Hoathly and Hellingly
Party	Candidate	Votes	%	±%
Conservative	Nick Bennett*	1,872	56.1	−3.1
Green	Alison Wilson	690	20.7	+13.2
Liberal Democrats	Beverley Johnstone	345	10.3	−9.4
Labour	Angie Smith	316	9.5	+2.6
Reform	Mark Everest	116	3.5	New
Majority		1182	35.4	−4.1
Turnout		3339	38.3	+0.3
Conservative hold		Swing	8.2	

Crowborough North and Jarvis Brook
Party	Candidate	Votes	%	±%
Conservative	Johanna Howell	1,131	33.7	−32.2
Liberal Democrats	Walter Partridge	1,096	32.6	+17.0
Independent	Peter Bucklitsch	551	16.4	New
Green	Colin Stocks	324	9.7	+1.7
Labour	Norman Warren	255	7.6	−2.8
Majority		35	1.0	−49.2
Turnout		3357	37.6	+5.4
Conservative hold		Swing	24.6	

Crowborough South and St Johns
Party	Candidate	Votes	%	±%
Conservative	Philip Lunn	1,647	55.7	−13.3
Liberal Democrats	Gareth Owen-Williams	686	23.2	+6.1
Green	Pamela Tysh	347	11.7	+5.5
Labour	Brendan Clegg	279	9.4	+1.7
Majority		961	32.5	−19.3
Turnout		2959	35.8	+2.9
Conservative hold		Swing	9.7	

Forest Row and Groombridge
Party	Candidate	Votes	%	±%
Green	Georgia Taylor	2,325	58.1	+14.2
Conservative	Simon Kirby	1,676	41.9	−3.9
Majority		649	16.2	+14.3
Turnout		4001	48.1	+8.3
Green gain from Conservative		Swing	14.1	

Hailsham Market
Party	Candidate	Votes	%	±%
Liberal Democrats	Steve Murphy	1,493	60.1	+33.7
Conservative	Bruce Broughton	888	35.7	−5.2
SDP	Stephen Gander	103	4.1	New
Majority		605	24.4	+9.9
Turnout		2484	29.6	−0.1
Liberal Democrats gain from Conservative		Swing	19.5	

Hailsham New Town
Party	Candidate	Votes	%	±%
Conservative	Gerard Fox*	1,282	47.6	−4.8
Liberal Democrats	Neil Cleaver	814	30.2	+4.3
Independent	Laurence Keeley	337	12.5	New
Labour	Christopher Morris	261	9.7	−5.1
Majority		468	17.4	−9.1
Turnout		2694	31.8	+2.4
Conservative hold		Swing	4.6	

Heathfield and Mayfield
Party	Candidate	Votes	%	±%
Conservative	Rupert Simmons*	1,954	59.2	−11.8
Green	Jennifer Howells	612	18.5	+12.1
Labour	Jason Scott-Taggart	383	11.6	+0.5
Liberal Democrats	Jane Clark	345	10.4	−1.5
Majority		1342	40.6	−18.1
Turnout		3303	36.4	+0.3
Conservative hold		Swing	12	

Maresfield and Buxted
Party	Candidate	Votes	%	±%
Conservative	Roy Galley*	2,360	62.4	−7.2
Green	Ian Tysh	670	17.7	+8.6
Liberal Democrats	Elizabeth Riminton	438	11.6	−1.6
Labour	Nigel Doggett	314	8.3	+0.2
Majority		1690	44.7	−11.6
Turnout		3782	41.3	+2.7
Conservative hold		Swing	7.9	

Pevensey and Stone Cross
Party	Candidate	Votes	%	±%
Conservative	Tom Liddiard*	1,212	50.1	+2.9
Liberal Democrats	Mark Fairweather	709	29.3	+18.2
Independent	Robert Slater	293	12.1	New
UKIP	Mike Pursglove	203	8.4	−9.1
Majority		503	20.8	−8.9
Turnout		2417	32.5	−4.2
Conservative hold		Swing	7.7	

Polegate and Watermill
Party	Candidate	Votes	%	±%
Independent Democrats	Daniel Dak Yan Shing	1825	54.3	+1.4
Conservative	Chris Primett	986	29.3	−0.4
Liberal Democrats	Olivia Honeyman	167	5.0	−1.6
Labour	Paul Hunt	231	6.9	+3.0
Green	Adrienne Hall	154	4.6	+2.8
Majority		839	24.9	+1.7
Turnout		3363	35.1	−3.7
Independent Democrats hold		Swing	0.9	

Daniel Dak Yan Shing previously stood as a Liberal Democrat before leaving the party due to his father's expulsion for bringing the party into disrepute.

Uckfield North
Party	Candidate	Votes	%	±%
Conservative	Claire Dowling*	1,295	48.8	−4.5
Liberal Democrats	Timothy Murray	1,010	38.1	+6.0
Green	Paul Shelton	347	13.1	+9.1
Majority		285	10.7	−10.4
Turnout		2652	36.7	+1.2
Conservative hold		Swing	5.3	

Uckfield South with Framfield
Party	Candidate	Votes	%	±%
Conservative	Chris Dowling*	1,460	47.6	−12.8
Labour	Ben Cox	1,092	35.6	+23.7
Liberal Democrats	Chris Bowers	512	16.7	−4.3
Majority		368	12.0	−27.4
Turnout		3065	40.9	+3.7
Conservative hold		Swing	18.3	

Wealden East
Party	Candidate	Votes	%	±%
Conservative	Bob Bowdler	2,015	49.6	−7.6
Green	Cornelie Usborne	1,754	43.2	+35.8
Labour	Barry Simons	292	7.2	−2.2
Majority		261	6.4	−33.0
Turnout		4061	42.9	+3.0
Conservative hold		Swing	21.7	

Bob Bowdler was the previous incumbent in Hailsham Market (Wealden)

Wealden North East
Party	Candidate	Votes	%	±%
Conservative	Bob Standley*	1,628	50.2	−18.0
Liberal Democrats	Lucy Pop Buck	714	22.0	+7.6
Green	Simon Cramond	461	14.2	+4.1
Labour	James Walker	438	13.5	+6.2
Majority		914	28.2	−25.6
Turnout		3241	40.0	+3.2
Conservative hold		Swing	12.8	

Willingdon and South Downs
Party	Candidate	Votes	%	±%
Independent Democrats	Stephen Sai Hung Shing*	2077	54.4	+4.6
Conservative	Douglas Murray	1,377	36.1	+2.1
Liberal Democrats	Hugh Parker	362	9.5	+1.9
Majority		700	18.3	+2.6
Turnout		3816	46.5	−1.6
Independent Democrats hold		Swing	1.3	

Stephen Sai Hung Shing was previously an elected councillor for the Liberal Democrats before being expelled for bringing the party into disrepute.

== By-elections ==
=== Heathfield & Mayfield ===
Heathfield and Mayfield by-election, 27 July 2023
Party	Candidate	Votes	%	±%
Green	Anne Cross	1,373	61.5	+43.0
Conservative	Neil Harry	858	38.5	−20.7
Majority		515	22.0	N/A
Turnout		2,247	24.8	−16.5
Green gain from Conservative		Swing	+31.8	

The Heathfield and Mayfield by-election was triggered by the death of Conservative councillor Rupert Simmons.

=== Meads ===
Meads by-election, 3 August 2023
Party	Candidate	Votes	%	±%
Liberal Democrats	Brett Wright	1,649	50.1	+10.1
Conservative	Nicholas Taylor	1,361	41.3	−4.3
Labour	David Mannion	157	4.8	−1.1
Green	Claire Martin	127	3.9	−2.2
Majority		288	8.8	N/A
Turnout			39.41	−6.3
Liberal Democrats gain from Conservative		Swing	+7.2	

The Meads by-election was triggered by the death of Conservative councillor Barry Taylor.

=== Ashdown & Conquest ===
Ashdown & Conquest by-election: 20 November 2025
Party	Candidate	Votes	%	±%
Reform	Aidan Fisher	797	32.2	N/A
Green	Paula Warne	607	24.5	+15.8
Conservative	Caroline Kerswell	494	19.9	–39.9
Labour	Amanda Pollard	395	15.9	–7.5
Liberal Democrats	Martin Griffiths	129	5.2	–3.5
Independent	Ricky Hodges	55	2.2	N/A
Majority		190	7.7	N/A
Turnout		2,480	30.9	–12.4
Registered electors		8,032		
Reform gain from Conservative				
