= 1989 East Sussex County Council election =

1989 English local election

- 4 May 1989

All 68 seats to East Sussex County Council 35 seats needed for a majority
- Registered: 537,978 (▲2.3%)
- Turnout: 40.0% (▼1.6%)

	First party	Second party	Third party
Party	Conservative	Labour	SLD
Seats won	38	17	15
Seat change	▲3	▲3	▼6
Popular vote	99,828	45,598	56,424
Percentage	46.4%	21.2%	26.3%
Swing	▲4.0%	▼1.0%	▼6.7%
Council control before election
No overall control
Council control after election
Conservative

The 1989 East Sussex County Council election took place on 4 May 1989 to elect members to East Sussex County Council in East Sussex, England. This was on the same day as other local elections.

== Summary ==
=== Election result ===
1989 East Sussex County Council election
Party	Candidates	Seats	Gains	Losses	Net gain/loss	Seats %	Votes %	Votes	+/−
Conservative	68	38	6	3	▲3	59.2	46.4	99,828	+4.0
Labour	66	17	4	1	▲3	25.0	21.2	45,598	–1.0
SLD	66	15	3	9	▼6	22.1	26.3	56,424	–6.7
Green	34	0	0	0	Steady	0.0	4.7	10,170	+4.1
Independent	4	0	0	0	Steady	0.0	0.8	1,772	+0.2
Independent Liberal	2	0	0	0	Steady	0.0	0.3	638	N/A
SDP	2	0	0	0	Steady	0.0	0.2	518	N/A

== Division results by local authority ==
=== Brighton ===
Brighton District Summary
Party	Seats	+/-	Votes	%	+/-
Labour	10	Steady	19,612	42.4	–1.2
Conservative	5	▲1	20,437	44.1	+8.9
SLD	0	▼1	3,366	7.3	–13.2
Green	0	Steady	2,844	6.1	+5.4
Independent	0	Steady	47	0.1	+0.1
Total	15	Steady	46,306	41.6	–2.6
Registered electors			111,412	–	+0.1

Division results

Hanover
Party	Candidate	Votes	%	±%
Labour	J. Newington	1,855	57.9	+2.4
Conservative	J. Back	762	23.8	+14.8
Green	L. Robinson	427	13.3	+10.7
SLD	K. McArthur	158	4.9	–28.0
Majority		1,093	34.1	+11.5
Turnout		3,202	38.0	–9.4
Registered electors		8,428		
Labour hold		Swing	▼6.2	

Hollingbury
Party	Candidate	Votes	%	±%
Labour	J. Lepper	1,681	54.6	–2.6
Conservative	L. Watts	934	30.4	+2.9
Green	M. Richardson	277	9.0	N/A
SLD	D. Lamb	184	6.0	–9.3
Majority		747	24.3	–5.4
Turnout		3,076	40.1	–2.0
Registered electors		7,671		
Labour hold		Swing	▼2.8	

Kings Cliff
Party	Candidate	Votes	%	±%
Labour	A. King	1,476	51.0	+0.8
Conservative	K. Burns	1,226	42.3	+5.0
SLD	M. Jones	194	6.7	–5.8
Majority		250	8.6	–4.3
Turnout		2,896	43.1	–3.6
Registered electors		6,720		
Labour hold		Swing	▼2.1	

Marine
Party	Candidate	Votes	%	±%
Labour	Donald Turner*	1,773	53.4	+2.1
Conservative	L. Romer-Ormiston	1,284	38.7	–0.3
Green	S. Watson	166	5.0	N/A
SLD	J. Lovatt	98	3.0	–6.7
Majority		489	14.7	+2.4
Turnout		3,321	43.8	–2.1
Registered electors		7,586		
Labour hold		Swing	▲1.2	

Moulsecoomb
Party	Candidate	Votes	%	±%
Labour	C. Walder	1,530	62.0	–1.1
Conservative	P. Ellis-Martin	751	30.4	+4.4
SLD	P. Viviann	186	7.5	–3.4
Majority		779	31.6	–5.5
Turnout		2,467	34.3	–2.0
Registered electors		7,192		
Labour hold		Swing	▼2.8	

Patcham
Party	Candidate	Votes	%	±%
Conservative	G. Theobald*	2,157	64.7	+11.3
Labour	J. Betts	942	28.2	–1.9
SLD	P. Garratt	237	7.1	–9.4
Majority		1,215	36.4	+13.1
Turnout		3,336	47.4	–5.6
Registered electors		7,036		
Conservative hold		Swing	▲6.6	

Queens Park
Party	Candidate	Votes	%	±%
Labour	K. Bodfish*	1,601	49.3	–6.9
Conservative	N. Maskell	1,280	39.4	+11.2
Green	M. Simpson	266	8.2	+4.9
SLD	R. Lewis	99	3.0	–9.3
Majority		321	9.9	–18.2
Turnout		3,246	48.8	+1.4
Registered electors		6,652		
Labour hold		Swing	▼9.1	

Regency
Party	Candidate	Votes	%	±%
Conservative	J. Cameron	1,279	42.1	+2.7
Labour	G. Griffiths	1,249	41.1	–5.6
Green	N. Duxfield	398	13.1	N/A
SLD	C. Bracken	115	3.8	–10.2
Majority		30	1.0	N/A
Turnout		3,041	41.3	–1.2
Registered electors		7,357		
Conservative gain from Labour		Swing	▲4.2	

Rottingdean
Party	Candidate	Votes	%	±%
Conservative	J. Mont*	2,695	73.1	+14.3
Labour	G. Woolf	366	9.9	+2.0
Green	G. Taylor	362	9.8	N/A
SLD	J. Marshall	263	7.1	–26.2
Majority		2,329	63.2	+37.6
Turnout		3,686	46.8	–5.1
Registered electors		7,881		
Conservative hold		Swing	▲6.2	

Seven Dials
Party	Candidate	Votes	%	±%
Labour	R. Austin	1,160	36.0	+5.8
Conservative	C. Williamson	991	30.7	+6.0
SLD	R. Heale	662	20.5	–24.0
Green	S. Currell	363	11.3	N/A
Independent	M. James	47	1.5	N/A
Majority		169	5.2	N/A
Turnout		3,223	43.7	+0.4
Registered electors		7,373		
Labour gain from SLD		Swing	▼0.1	

St Peters
Party	Candidate	Votes	%	±%
Labour	H. Spillman*	1,400	45.8	+0.4
Conservative	S. Lister	944	30.9	+4.7
Green	I. Brodie	585	19.2	+15.8
SLD	W. Parker	125	4.1	–21.0
Majority		456	14.9	–4.3
Turnout		3,054	41.4	–5.3
Registered electors		7,373		
Labour hold		Swing	▼2.2	

Stanmer
Party	Candidate	Votes	%	±%
Labour	P. Matz	1,542	50.5	–7.5
Conservative	L. McConochie	1,242	40.7	+12.3
SLD	M. Hills	268	8.8	–4.8
Majority		300	9.8	–19.8
Turnout		3,052	41.4	–1.5
Registered electors		7,375		
Labour hold		Swing	▼9.9	

Tenantry
Party	Candidate	Votes	%	±%
Labour	Sheila Charlton*	1,461	57.4	–1.7
Conservative	J. Stevens	879	34.5	+9.6
SLD	A. Millineux	205	8.1	–8.0
Majority		582	22.9	–11.3
Turnout		2,545	33.4	–3.5
Registered electors		7,623		
Labour hold		Swing	▼5.6	

Westdene
Party	Candidate	Votes	%	±%
Conservative	P. Drake*	2,029	68.0	+16.3
Labour	F. Spicer	636	21.3	+1.3
SLD	D. McBeth	320	10.7	–17.7
Majority		1,393	46.7	+23.4
Turnout		2,985	40.8	–1.5
Registered electors		7,321		
Conservative hold		Swing	▲7.5	

Woodingdean
Party	Candidate	Votes	%	±%
Conservative	B. Thomas*	1,984	62.5	+14.5
Labour	I. Fyvie	940	29.6	–7.9
SLD	O. McElroy	252	7.9	–6.6
Majority		1,044	32.9	+22.4
Turnout		3,176	40.6	–2.2
Registered electors		7,824		
Conservative hold		Swing	▲11.2	

=== Eastbourne ===
Eastbourne District Summary
Party	Seats	+/-	Votes	%	+/-
SLD	4	▼1	9,869	37.2	–12.4
Conservative	3	Steady	11,756	44.4	+3.3
Labour	1	▲1	2,771	10.5	+1.2
Green	0	Steady	1,238	4.7	N/A
Ind. Liberal	0	Steady	638	2.4	N/A
SDP	0	Steady	226	0.9	N/A
Total	8	Steady	26,498	42.9	–1.4
Registered electors			61,795	–	–0.9

Division results

Cavendish
Party	Candidate	Votes	%	±%
SLD	J. Healy*	1,802	57.0	–8.0
Conservative	M. Pentecost	861	27.3	+2.2
Green	R. Geals	264	8.4	N/A
Labour	H. Turner	232	7.3	–2.6
Majority		941	29.8	–10.1
Turnout		3,159	39.6	–3.7
Registered electors		7,970		
SLD hold		Swing	▼5.1	

College
Party	Candidate	Votes	%	±%
Conservative	L. Vickers*	2,526	80.0	+3.5
SLD	J. Britcher	631	20.0	–3.5
Majority		1,895	60.0	+7.0
Turnout		3,157	42.6	+0.4
Registered electors		7,403		
Conservative hold		Swing	▲3.5	

Old Town
Party	Candidate	Votes	%	±%
SLD	M. Skilton*	1,758	49.7	–7.2
Conservative	J. Wood	1,106	31.3	–2.1
Green	J. Oliphant	326	9.2	N/A
Labour	M. Osborn	247	7.0	–2.7
Independent Liberal	L. Ryder	101	2.9	N/A
Majority		652	18.4	–5.1
Turnout		3,538	47.2	+0.3
Registered electors		7,493		
SLD hold		Swing	▼2.6	

Park
Party	Candidate	Votes	%	±%
Labour	C. Cole	1,322	41.3	+3.6
SLD	J. Ungar	1,036	32.4	–12.3
Conservative	George Mills	840	26.3	+8.7
Majority		286	8.9	N/A
Turnout		3,198	44.0	+0.1
Registered electors		7,273		
Labour gain from SLD		Swing	▲8.0	

Princes
Party	Candidate	Votes	%	±%
SLD	J. Grist*	1,374	41.5	–10.7
Conservative	T. Lowe	1,225	37.0	+0.7
Labour	A. Riddington	311	9.4	–2.0
SDP	L. Smith	226	6.8	N/A
Green	C. Quarrington	173	5.2	N/A
Majority		149	4.5	–11.4
Turnout		3,309	46.8	+1.8
Registered electors		7,075		
SLD hold		Swing	▼5.7	

Priory
Party	Candidate	Votes	%	±%
SLD	D. Toft	2,370	66.0	–2.1
Conservative	R. Mould	863	24.0	–1.7
Labour	S. McManus	200	5.6	–0.6
Green	J. Wells	160	4.5	N/A
Majority		1,507	41.9	–0.6
Turnout		3,593	40.1	–4.8
Registered electors		8,969		
SLD hold		Swing	▼0.2	

St Marys
Party	Candidate	Votes	%	±%
Conservative	C. Brewer	1,891	66.7	+5.4
SLD	D. O'Neill	442	15.6	–23.1
Green	J. Stratton	315	11.1	N/A
Labour	G. Coates	186	6.6	N/A
Majority		1,449	51.1	+28.5
Turnout		2,834	36.2	–0.6
Registered electors		7,825		
Conservative hold		Swing	▲14.3	

Woodlands
Party	Candidate	Votes	%	±%
Conservative	Michael Tunwell*	2,444	65.9	+9.0
Independent Liberal	S. Williamson	537	14.5	N/A
SLD	R. Parsons	456	12.3	–30.8
Labour	D. Poole	273	7.4	N/A
Majority		1,907	51.4	+37.7
Turnout		3,710	47.6	–3.6
Registered electors		7,787		
Conservative hold				

=== Hastings ===
Hastings District Summary
Party	Seats	+/-	Votes	%	+/-
SLD	3	▼2	5,864	31.3	–11.1
Labour	3	▲2	5,829	31.1	+1.4
Conservative	1	Steady	6,221	33.2	+6.2
Green	0		814	4.3	+3.7
Total	7	Steady	18,728	33.9	–2.9
Registered electors			55,251	–	+3.1

Division results

Braybrooke & Castle
Party	Candidate	Votes	%	±%
SLD	Pam Brown*	1,116	46.4	–6.7
Conservative	S. Barr	684	28.4	+2.9
Labour	M. Hardcastle	477	19.8	–1.6
Green	S. Phillips	128	5.3	N/A
Majority		432	18.0	–9.6
Turnout		2,405	33.3	–1.8
Registered electors		7,226		
SLD hold		Swing	▼4.8	

Broomgrove & Ore
Party	Candidate	Votes	%	±%
Labour	T. Randall	1,231	47.3	+13.7
SLD	Richard Moore	617	23.7	–24.3
Conservative	J. Marshall	513	19.7	+1.3
Green	K. Brown	241	9.3	N/A
Majority		614	23.6	N/A
Turnout		2,602	34.2	–6.4
Registered electors		7,600		
Labour gain from SLD		Swing	▲19.0	

Central St Leonards & Gensing
Party	Candidate	Votes	%	±%
SLD	Jane Amstad*	1,338	49.2	+5.7
Conservative	J. Woodhams	1,036	38.1	+3.6
Labour	J. Leskiw	344	12.7	–2.4
Majority		302	11.1	+2.1
Turnout		2,718	34.5	–0.6
Registered electors		7,869		
SLD hold		Swing	▲1.1	

Hollington & Ashdown
Party	Candidate	Votes	%	±%
Labour	Michael Foster*	1,531	54.3	+5.2
Conservative	L. Russell	881	31.2	+2.9
SLD	M. Richardson	408	14.5	–8.1
Majority		650	23.0	+2.2
Turnout		2,820	33.1	–7.7
Registered electors		8,527		
Labour hold		Swing	▲1.5	

Old Hastings & Mount Pleasant
Party	Candidate	Votes	%	±%
SLD	P. Kendrick	1,082	38.9	–3.3
Labour	H. Henson	899	32.3	+2.2
Conservative	R. Anstey	804	28.9	+1.2
Majority		183	6.6	–5.5
Turnout		2,785	36.6	–5.0
Registered electors		7,616		
SLD hold		Swing	▼2.8	

Silverhill & Wishing Tree
Party	Candidate	Votes	%	±%
Labour	J. Wallis	933	31.4	–7.4
Conservative	A. Hustwayte	908	30.6	N/A
SLD	P. Smith*	894	30.1	–31.1
Green	R. Sloan	234	7.9	N/A
Majority		25	0.8	N/A
Turnout		2.969	36.8	+3.9
Registered electors		8,057		
Labour gain from SLD				

West St Leonards & Maze Hill
Party	Candidate	Votes	%	±%
Conservative	J. Hodgson*	1,395	57.4	+0.8
Labour	S. Nester	414	17.0	+0.5
SLD	S. Coates	409	16.8	–10.2
Green	M. Rowland	211	8.7	N/A
Majority		981	40.4	+10.8
Turnout		2,429	29.4	–2.9
Registered electors		8,256		
Conservative hold		Swing	▲0.2	

=== Hove ===
Hove District Summary
Party	Seats	+/-	Votes	%	+/-
Conservative	6	Steady	11,498	46.7	+2.4
Labour	2	Steady	6,984	28.4	+3.7
Liberal Democrats	2	Steady	5,189	21.1	–8.1
Green	0	Steady	954	3.9	+3.5
Total	10	Steady	24,625	34.6	–2.3
Registered electors			71,169	–	–1.6

Division results

Brunswick & Adelaide
Party	Candidate	Votes	%	±%
SLD	B. Bailey*	1,566	60.4	–4.6
Conservative	H. Allanson	700	27.0	+12.3
Labour	S. Carden	184	7.1	–1.1
Green	E. Parker	143	5.5	N/A
Majority		866	33.4	–16.9
Turnout		2,593	34.6	–2.5
Registered electors		7,504		
SLD hold		Swing	▼8.5	

Goldsmid
Party	Candidate	Votes	%	±%
Conservative	J. Langston	1,589	64.6	+4.8
Green	M. Rose	337	13.7	N/A
Labour	D. Uzzaman	308	12.5	–3.8
SLD	B. Driffill	225	9.2	–14.6
Majority		1,252	50.9	+14.9
Turnout		2,459	33.8	–1.1
Registered electors		7,284		
Conservative hold				

Hangleton
Party	Candidate	Votes	%	±%
Conservative	W. Williams*	1,044	46.1	–1.8
Labour	G. Kielty	989	43.7	+9.7
SLD	M. Harkness	231	10.2	–7.8
Majority		55	2.4	–11.5
Turnout		2,264	33.3	+2.4
Registered electors		6,809		
Conservative hold		Swing	▼5.8	

Nevill
Party	Candidate	Votes	%	±%
Conservative	P. Lewis	1,266	57.8	–7.3
Labour	L. Wren	696	31.8	+12.8
SLD	G. Harkess	230	10.5	–5.4
Majority		570	26.0	–10.1
Turnout		2,192	33.4	–3.3
Registered electors		6,567		
Conservative hold		Swing	▼10.1	

Portslade North
Party	Candidate	Votes	%	±%
Labour	L. Hamilton*	1,587	62.7	+0.8
Conservative	J. Kapp	726	28.7	+0.8
Green	K. Gray	160	6.3	N/A
SLD	A. Cole	60	2.4	–7.8
Majority		861	34.0	±0.0
Turnout		2,533	36.8	–1.0
Registered electors		6,891		
Labour hold		Swing	0.0	

Portslade South
Party	Candidate	Votes	%	±%
Labour	D. Turner*	1,295	49.7	+9.7
Conservative	R. Ireland	1,051	40.4	+10.7
SLD	I. James	258	9.9	–20.4
Majority		244	9.4	–0.2
Turnout		2,604	35.5	–7.5
Registered electors		7,342		
Labour hold		Swing	▼0.5	

Stanford
Party	Candidate	Votes	%	±%
Conservative	G. Exley*	1,436	76.6	+3.5
SLD	B. Smith	271	14.5	–5.1
Labour	J. Stacey	168	9.0	+1.7
Majority		1,165	62.1	+8.6
Turnout		1,875	28.3	–6.7
Registered electors		6,627		
Conservative hold		Swing	▲4.3	

Vallance
Party	Candidate	Votes	%	±%
Conservative	S. Stevens*	1,205	54.2	+3.0
Labour	A. Richards	543	24.4	–5.4
Green	J. Da Costa	314	14.1	+12.3
SLD	T. Yeo	162	7.3	–9.9
Majority		662	29.8	+8.3
Turnout		2,224	30.0	–3.9
Registered electors		7,415		
Conservative hold		Swing	▲4.2	

Westbourne
Party	Candidate	Votes	%	±%
SLD	M. Randell	1,272	46.4	–2.3
Conservative	C. Brimmell	1,156	42.2	+4.2
Labour	M. Atkinson	314	11.5	+0.2
Majority		116	4.2	–6.5
Turnout		2,742	36.1	–7.5
Registered electors		7,606		
SLD hold		Swing	▼3.3	

Wish
Party	Candidate	Votes	%	±%
Conservative	A. Rowe*	1,324	43.6	–4.8
Labour	I. Caplin	900	29.6	+8.7
SLD	F. Honore	814	26.8	–3.9
Majority		424	14.0	–3.7
Turnout		3,038	42.6	+6.9
Registered electors		7,124		
Conservative hold		Swing	▼6.8	

=== Lewes ===
Lewes District Summary
Party	Seats	+/-	Votes	%	+/-
Conservative	4	▼1	12,944	42.5	+0.9
SLD	4	▲1	12,018	39.5	+2.6
Labour	0	Steady	3,659	12.0	–5.5
Green	0	Steady	1,775	5.8	+3.5
Independent	0	Steady	55	0.2	–1.6
Total	8	Steady	30,451	43.8	–1.6
Registered electors			69,524	–	+6.3

Division results

Chailey
Party	Candidate	Votes	%	±%
Conservative	S. Whitley*	1,929	58.3	+2.3
SLD	C. Tester	754	22.8	–21.2
Green	D. Wimbush	448	13.5	N/A
Labour	M. Woodling	178	5.4	N/A
Majority		1,175	35.5	+11.8
Turnout		3,309	37.0	–1.2
Registered electors		8,955		
Conservative hold		Swing	▲11.8	

Lewes
Party	Candidate	Votes	%	±%
SLD	D. Venables*	1,895	42.4	+7,7
Conservative	J. Mackenzie-Hill	1,270	28.4	–1.8
Labour	I. Smith	768	17.2	–12.9
Green	M. Ryle	541	12.1	+7.2
Majority		625	14.0	+9.5
Turnout		3,933	55.4	–5.7
Registered electors		8,074		
SLD hold		Swing	▲4.8	

Newhaven
Party	Candidate	Votes	%	±%
SLD	David Rogers	1,795	48.8	+34.6
Conservative	P. Harwood*	1,299	35.3	–8.4
Labour	M. Baker	389	10.6	–26.9
Green	A. Beaumont	195	5.3	N/A
Majority		496	13.5	N/A
Turnout		3,678	46.1	+3.1
Registered electors		7,983		
SLD gain from Conservative		Swing	▲21.5	

Peacehaven
Party	Candidate	Votes	%	±%
Conservative	L. Vince	1,776	46.4	+3.9
SLD	D. Reynolds	1,223	31.9	+3.1
Labour	P. Anscomb	831	21.7	–7.0
Majority		553	14.4	+0.7
Turnout		3,830	36.5	–2.4
Registered electors		10,505		
Conservative hold		Swing	▲0.4	

Ringmer
Party	Candidate	Votes	%	±%
SLD	David Bellotti	2,437	59.8	+1.9
Conservative	C. Butler	864	21.2	–4.9
Green	A. Sherwood	389	9.5	+6.4
Labour	R. Murray	386	9.5	–3.4
Majority		1,573	38.6	+6.8
Turnout		4,076	49.2	–6.9
Registered electors		8,287		
SLD hold		Swing	▲3.4	

Seaford (Blatchington)
Party	Candidate	Votes	%	±%
Conservative	A. Wallis	2,319	59.9	+12.1
SLD	L. Owen	1,071	27.7	–24.5
Labour	R. Brandley	481	12.4	N/A
Majority		1,248	32.2	N/A
Turnout		1,248	43.5	+1.1
Registered electors		8,893		
Conservative gain from SLD		Swing	▲18.3	

Seaford (Sutton)
Party	Candidate	Votes	%	±%
Conservative	R. Raw	2,003	53.5	+3.6
SLD	A. Stiles	1,148	30.6	+3.3
Labour	Alison Chapman	339	9.0	+0.5
Green	S. Crouch	202	5.4	+1.6
Independent	R. White	55	1.5	N/A
Majority		855	22.8	+0.3
Turnout		3,747	45.1	–0.3
Registered electors		8,302		
Conservative hold		Swing	▲0.2	

Telscombe
Party	Candidate	Votes	%	±%
SLD	N. Baker	1,695	48.9	+18.5
Conservative	M. Parker	1,484	42.8	–4.7
Labour	P. Madej	287	8.3	–8.6
Majority		211	6.1	N/A
Turnout		3,466	40.7	+1.2
Registered electors		8,525		
SLD gain from Conservative		Swing	▲11.6	

=== Rother ===
Rother District Summary
Party	Seats	+/-	Votes	%	+/-
Conservative	6	▲1	15,451	50.8	–2.7
SLD	1	▼1	9,977	32.8	+6.5
Labour	1	Steady	3,342	11.0	–1.7
Independent	0	Steady	1,354	4.5	+1.8
Green	0	Steady	279	0.9	N/A
Total	8	Steady	30,403	44.9	+2.2
Registered electors			67,649	–	+6.3

Division results

Battle
Party	Candidate	Votes	%	±%
Conservative	M. Bell	2,151	51.3	+4.6
SLD	J. Theis	1,784	42.5	–10.8
Labour	R. Pugh	261	6.2	N/A
Majority		367	8.7	N/A
Turnout		4,196	50.8	+3.4
Registered electors		8,260		
Conservative gain from SLD		Swing	▲7.7	

Bexhill East
Party	Candidate	Votes	%	±%
Conservative	V. Poole	1,739	51.0	+4.0
Independent	M. Kenward	1,354	39.7	N/A
Labour	S. Ramsbottom	319	9.3	+1.6
Majority		385	11.3	+9.7
Turnout		3,412	43.5	+3.3
Registered electors		7,835		
Conservative hold				

Bexhill North
Party	Candidate	Votes	%	±%
Labour	A. Ottley*	1,375	41.8	–15.3
Conservative	P. Bullock	1,220	37.1	–5.8
SLD	C. Clark	694	21.1	N/A
Majority		155	4.7	–9.6
Turnout		3,289	42.3	+4.6
Registered electors		7,784		
Labour hold		Swing	▼5.0	

Bexhill South
Party	Candidate	Votes	%	±%
Conservative	J. Lloyd	2,200	57.3	–9.2
SLD	C. Nicholson	1,363	35.5	N/A
Labour	S. Gover	277	7.2	–5.1
Majority		837	21.8	–23.5
Turnout		3,840	44.5	+2.5
Registered electors		8,630		
Conservative hold				

Bexhill West
Party	Candidate	Votes	%	±%
Conservative	W. Clements	2,700	65.5	–0.1
SLD	B. Eberli	1,054	25.6	–1.2
Labour	A. Cradock	371	9.0	+1.4
Majority		1,646	39.9	+1.1
Turnout		4,125	44.3	–0.1
Registered electors		9,321		
Conservative hold		Swing	▲0.6	

Rye
Party	Candidate	Votes	%	±%
Conservative	Joan Yates*	1,578	46.2	–11.0
SLD	J. Wise	1,114	32.6	+3.8
Labour	W. Walsh	442	13.0	–1.1
Green	D. Stuart	279	8.2	N/A
Majority		464	13.6	–14.8
Turnout		3,413	41.9	–2.5
Registered electors		8,149		
Conservative hold		Swing	▼7.4	

Ticehurst
Party	Candidate	Votes	%	±%
SLD	Ann Moore*	2,309	54.2	–0.2
Conservative	D. Vereker	1,950	45.8	+0.2
Majority		355	8.4	–0.5
Turnout		4,259	48.7	+4.0
Registered electors		8,744		
SLD hold		Swing	▼0.2	

Winchelsea
Party	Candidate	Votes	%	±%
Conservative	R. Pulford	1,913	49.4	–4.1
SLD	J. Holden	1,659	42.9	+7.6
Labour	G. Johnson	297	7.7	–3.6
Majority		254	6.6	–11.6
Turnout		3,869	43.3	+2.8
Registered electors		8,926		
Conservative hold		Swing	▼5.9	

=== Wealden ===
Wealden District Summary
Party	Seats	+/-	Votes	%	+/-
Conservative	11	Steady	21,521	56.7	+4.8
SLD	1	Steady	10,141	26.7	–10.0
Labour	0	Steady	3,401	9.0	–0.1
Green	0	Steady	2,266	6.0	N/A
Independent	0	Steady	316	0.8	N/A
SDP	0	Steady	292	0.8	N/A
Total	12	Steady	37,937	37.5	–2.1
Registered electors			101,178	–	+3.8

Division results

Buxted & Maresfield
Party	Candidate	Votes	%	±%
Conservative	D. Cumming*	2,665	78.1	+18.2
SLD	R. Scott	364	10.7	–22.5
Green	K. Kauffman	261	7.6	N/A
Labour	S. McCormick	122	3.6	–3.3
Majority		2,301	67.4	+40.7
Turnout		3,412	38.7	+1.4
Registered electors		8,820		
Conservative hold		Swing	▲20.4	

Crowborough (Beacon)
Party	Candidate	Votes	%	±%
Conservative	D. Russell*	1,655	50.8	+3.1
SLD	R. Holder	1,036	31.8	–10.8
Green	S. Montague	340	10.4	N/A
Labour	E. South	230	7.1	–2.5
Majority		619	19.0	+13.9
Turnout		3,261	37.4	+2.9
Registered electors		8,729		
Conservative hold		Swing	▲7.0	

Crowborough (Rothersfield)
Party	Candidate	Votes	%	±%
Conservative	F. Edmonds*	1,588	52.6	+2.1
SLD	E. Rice	901	29.8	–12.2
Green	R. Webberley	333	11.0	N/A
Labour	I. Salmon	198	6.6	–0.8
Majority		687	22.7	+14.2
Turnout		3,020	35.3	–1.5
Registered electors		8,550		
Conservative hold		Swing	▲7.2	

Forest Row
Party	Candidate	Votes	%	±%
Conservative	O. Hughes*	1,313	54.5	–7.3
Green	D. Linington	366	15.2	N/A
Independent	A. Grubb	316	13.1	N/A
SDP	H. Bracken	292	12.1	N/A
Labour	E. Lucas	124	5.1	–2.2
Majority		947	39.3	+20.8
Turnout		2,387	36.1	–2.4
Registered electors		6,683		
Conservative hold				

Hailsham
Party	Candidate	Votes	%	±%
Conservative	B. Gray*	1,042	52.4	+6.1
Labour	D. Rose	483	24.3	+1.2
SLD	A. Cameron	465	23.4	–7.2
Majority		559	28.1	+12.4
Turnout		1,990	28.3	–4.1
Registered electors		7,040		
Conservative hold		Swing	▲2.5	

Heathfield
Party	Candidate	Votes	%	±%
Conservative	H. Hatcher*	2,476	62.8	+7.1
SLD	V. Banks	1,140	28.9	–7.9
Labour	K. Reynolds	325	8.2	+0.7
Majority		1,336	33.9	+15.0
Turnout		3,941	36.7	–5.7
Registered electors		10,735		
Conservative hold		Swing	▲7.5	

Hellingly
Party	Candidate	Votes	%	±%
Conservative	C. Kelly*	1,373	52.7	+2.9
SLD	D. White	949	36.5	–0.2
Labour	S. White	281	10.8	–2.7
Majority		424	16.3	+3.1
Turnout		2,603	30.0	–4.9
Registered electors		8,669		
Conservative hold		Swing	▲1.6	

Pevensey
Party	Candidate	Votes	%	±%
Conservative	G. Hart*	2,210	61.8	+7.1
SLD	Robert Kiernan	932	27.2	–17.8
Labour	V. Castle	378	11.0	N/A
Majority		1,278	34.6	+23.3
Turnout		3,520	39.6	–1.8
Registered electors		8,669		
Conservative hold		Swing	▲12.5	

Polegate
Party	Candidate	Votes	%	±%
SLD	R. Martin	2,007	52.9	+22.4
Conservative	R. Buckley	1,263	33.3	–1.2
Labour	A. Beck	298	7.9	–2.1
Green	R. Addison	227	6.0	N/A
Majority		744	19.6	N/A
Turnout		3,795	46.3	+2.3
Registered electors		8,204		
SLD gain from Conservative		Swing	▲11.8	

Uckfield
Party	Candidate	Votes	%	±%
Conservative	D. Tricker	1,697	44.9	+5.6
SLD	R. Gray	1,400	37.0	–14.2
Green	P. Selby	350	9.3	N/A
Labour	J. Sones	335	8.9	–0.6
Majority		297	7.9	N/A
Turnout		3,782	40.2	–5.6
Registered electors		9,418		
Conservative gain from SLD		Swing	▲9.9	

Wadhurst
Party	Candidate	Votes	%	±%
Conservative	M. Wright*	1,980	73.8	+14.5
SLD	R. Ferry	449	16.7	–15.8
Labour	J. Windebank	253	9.4	+1.2
Majority		1,531	57.1	+30.3
Turnout		2,682	36.1	–5.8
Registered electors		7,425		
Conservative hold		Swing	▲15.2	

Willingdon
Party	Candidate	Votes	%	±%
Conservative	J. Chatfield*	2,259	64.2	–3.3
SLD	R. May	498	14.1	–7.2
Green	L. Surgey	389	11.1	N/A
Labour	G. Page	374	10.6	–0.6
Majority		1,761	50.0	+3.8
Turnout		3,520	42.7	–1.0
Registered electors		8,236		
Conservative hold		Swing	▲2.0	
