= 2009 East Sussex County Council election =

2009 UK local government election

- 4 June 2009

All 49 seats to East Sussex County Council 25 seats needed for a majority
	First party	Second party	Third party
Party	Conservative	Liberal Democrats	Labour
Seats won	29	13	4
Seat change	Steady	Steady	▼1
- 2009 local election results in East Sussex
Council control before election
Conservative
Council control after election
Conservative

The East Sussex County Council election, 2009 took place on 4 June 2009 as part of the 2009 United Kingdom local elections, having been delayed from 7 May, to coincide with elections to the European Parliament. All 49 seats of this council were up for election. The councillors were elected from 44 electoral divisions, which accordingly return one or two by first-past-the-post voting, for a four-year term of office.

All locally registered electors (British, Irish, Commonwealth and European Union citizens) who were aged 18 or over on Thursday 4 June 2009 were entitled to vote in the local elections. Those who were temporarily away from their ordinary address (for example, away working, on holiday, in student accommodation or in hospital) were also entitled to vote in the local elections, although those who had moved abroad and registered as overseas electors cannot vote in the local elections. It is possible to register to vote at more than one address (such as a university student who had a term-time address and lives at home during holidays) at the discretion of the local Electoral Register Office, but it remains an offence to vote more than once in the same local government election.

== Overall Results ==
2009 East Sussex County Council election
Party	Seats	Gains	Losses	Net gain/loss	Seats %	Votes %	Votes	+/−
Conservative	29			0	59.2	39.88	73,734	
Liberal Democrats	13			0	26.5	30.66	56,683	
Labour	4			-1	8.2	8.08	14,947	
Independent	3			+1	6.1	6.76	12,491	
UKIP	0			0	0	7.60	14,046	
Green	0			0	0	5.24	9,679	
BNP	0			0	0	1.16	2,149	
Other parties	0			0	0	0.63	1,156	

== Results by division (A-Z) ==
Alfriston, East Hoathly & Hellingly Division
Party	Candidate	Votes	%	±%
Conservative	Nick Bennett	1,720	43.1	−13.8
Liberal Democrats	David White	1475	37.0	−6.1
UKIP	Lizzie Chisholm	562	14.1	N/A
Independent	Raymond Shing	230	5.8	N/A
Majority		245	6.1	−7.7
Turnout		3987	N/A	N/A
Conservative hold		Swing	N/A	

Ashdown & Conquest Division
Party	Candidate	Votes	%	±%
Conservative	Peter Pragnell	1,679	53.2	+7.8
Liberal Democrats	Anne Gallop	619	19.6	−12.2
Labour	Bruce Dowling	502	15.9	−2.6
BNP	Keith Standring	354	11.2	N/A
Majority		1060	33.6	+20.0
Turnout		3154	N/A	N/A
Conservative hold		Swing	N/A	

Baird & Ore Division
Party	Candidate	Votes	%	±%
Conservative	Terry Fawthrop	809	32.5	−0.1
Labour	Kim Forward	771	31.0	−12.3
UKIP	Paul Willard	382	15.4	N/A
Liberal Democrats	Anne Scott	353	14.2	−6.0
BNP	Frank Swaine	173	7.0	N/A
Majority		38	1.5	−9.2
Turnout		2488	N/A	N/A
Conservative gain from Labour		Swing	N/A	

Battle & Crowhurst Division
Party	Candidate	Votes	%	±%
Liberal Democrats	Kathryn Field *	1,849	56.5	+7.7
Conservative	Samantha Guard	1225	37.4	−1.0
Labour	Richard Body	198	6.1	−6.7
Majority		624	19.1	+8.7
Turnout		3272	N/A	N/A
Liberal Democrats hold		Swing	N/A	

Bexhill East Division
Party	Candidate	Votes	%	±%
Conservative	Martin Kenward	946	34.0	−15.3
Liberal Democrats	Martyn Forster *	940	33.8	−16.9
UKIP	Diane Granger	688	24.7	N/A
Labour	Maurice Watson	207	7.4	N/A
Majority		6	0.2	−1.2
Turnout		2781	N/A	N/A
Conservative gain from Liberal Democrats		Swing	N/A	

Bexhill King Offa Division
Party	Candidate	Votes	%	±%
Conservative	Michael Ensor	2,821	43.2	+4.0
Conservative	Joy Hughes	2,647		
Liberal Democrats	John Kemp	1681	25.7	−4.9
Liberal Democrats	Marcia Linden	1632		
UKIP	Frederick Jones	1427	21.9	N/A
UKIP	Kenneth Lampey	1346		
Labour	Timothy MacPherson	601	9.2	−21.0
Labour	Hugh Meredith	511		
Majority		2155	17.0	+8.4
Turnout		12666	N/A	N/A
Conservative hold		Swing	N/A	
Conservative hold		Swing	N/A	

Bexhill West Division
Party	Candidate	Votes	%	±%
Conservative	Brian Gadd *	1,792	50.9	−10.1
Liberal Democrats	Nick Hollington	1594	45.3	+6.3
Labour	Abdulla Khan	135	3.8	N/A
Majority		198	5.6	−16.4
Turnout		3521	N/A	N/A
Conservative hold		Swing	N/A	

Braybrooke & Castle Division
Party	Candidate	Votes	%	±%
Labour	Godfrey Daniel *	1,522	47.5	−0.1
Independent	Andy Dumas	625	19.5	N/A
Conservative	Matthew Beever	581	18.1	−6.3
Liberal Democrats	Roger Weeden	318	9.9	−10.7
BNP	Michael Turner	161	5.0	N/A
Majority		897	28.0	+4.8
Turnout		3207	N/A	N/A
Labour hold		Swing	N/A	

Brede Valley & Marsham Division
Party	Candidate	Votes	%	±%
Conservative	Carl Maynard *	1,885	62.0	+6.9
Liberal Democrats	Derek Greenup	871	28.6	+0.5
Labour	Linda Harland	286	9.4	−7.3
Majority		1014	33.3	+6.3
Turnout		3042	N/A	N/A
Conservative hold		Swing	N/A	

Buxted Maresfield Division
Party	Candidate	Votes	%	±%
Conservative	Tony Reid *	2,559	68.1	+4.8
Green	David Jonas	531	14.1	N/A
Liberal Democrats	Alan Whittaker	516	13.7	−12.0
Labour	Nathan Webb	152	4.0	−7.1
Majority		2028	54.0	+16.5
Turnout		3758	N/A	N/A
Conservative hold		Swing	N/A	

Central St Leonards & Gensing Division
Party	Candidate	Votes	%	±%
Labour	Trevor Webb *	1,068	40.6	+1.0
Conservative	Simon Corello	843	32.0	+3.6
Liberal Democrats	Oliver Maloney	552	19.8	−3.0
BNP	Stephen Weir	200	7.6	N/A
Majority		225	8.6	−2.6
Turnout		2663	N/A	N/A
Labour hold		Swing	N/A	

Chailey Division
Party	Candidate	Votes	%	±%
Conservative	Meg Stroude *	2,581	59.7	+9.8
Liberal Democrats	Ann Jamieson	1163	26.9	−9.6
Green	Richard Rudkin	443	10.3	+4.0
Labour	Louis Blair	134	3.1	−4.2
Majority		1418	32.8	+19.4
Turnout		4321	N/A	N/A
Conservative hold		Swing	N/A	

Crowborough Division
Party	Candidate	Votes	%	±%
Conservative	Richard Stodgon *	3,470	49.4	+7.1
Conservative	Sylvia Tidy *	3,362		
Liberal Democrats	Jane Clark	1801	25.7	+−0.0
Green	Colin Stocks	1242	17.7	+9.4
Liberal Democrats	Chris Bowers	934		
Labour	Brendan Clegg	505	7.2	−4.7
Majority		N/A	23.7	+7.1
Turnout		11314	N/A	N/A
Conservative hold		Swing	N/A	
Conservative hold		Swing	N/A	

Devonshire Division
Party	Candidate	Votes	%	±%
Liberal Democrats	Beryl Healey *	1,325	51.7	−3.6
Conservative	Reg Jenkins	513	20.0	−4.8
UKIP	Leonard Richardson	355	13.9	+11.0
Green	Kevin Moore	214	8.4	+3.1
Labour	Richard Goude	154	6.0	−5.7
Majority		812	31.7	+1.2
Turnout		2561	N/A	N/A
Liberal Democrats hold		Swing	N/A	

Forest Row Division
Party	Candidate	Votes	%	±%
Conservative	Francis Whetstone *	1,976	47.2	−2.6
Green	Keith Obbard	1754	41.9	N/A
English Democrat	David Butcher	454	10.9	N/A
Majority		222	5.3	−18.3
Turnout		4184	N/A	N/A
Conservative hold		Swing	N/A	

Framfield & Horam Division
Party	Candidate	Votes	%	±%
Conservative	Christopher Dowling *	2,546	69.1	+15.0
Liberal Democrats	Michael Harker	971	26.4	−1.4
Labour	Vanessa Setford-Smith	167	4.5	−7.7
Majority		1575	42.7	+16.4
Turnout		3684	N/A	N/A
Conservative hold		Swing	N/A	

Hailsham & Herstmonceux Division
Party	Candidate	Votes	%	±%
Conservative	Bill Bentley *	2,913	37.0	−6.2
Conservative	Roger Thomas	2,301		
UKIP	Laurence Keeley	1939	24.6	+14.9
Liberal Democrats	Laura Murphy	1873	23.8	−6.8
Liberal Democrats	Anne Blake Coggins	1806		
English Democrat	Kevin Moore	702	8.9	N/A
Labour	Laura Jordan	442	5.6	−10.9
Majority		N/A	12.4	−0.2
Turnout		11976	N/A	N/A
Conservative hold		Swing	N/A	
Conservative hold		Swing	N/A	

Hampden Park Division
Party	Candidate	Votes	%	±%
Liberal Democrats	Mike Thompson	870	37.3	−21.2
Conservative	Caroline Ansell	556	23.8	+3.5
UKIP	Betty Kennelly	352	15.1	N/A
Independent	Oi Shing	225	9.6	N/A
Green	Dalton Leslie	186	8.0	+3.4
Labour	David Salmon	143	6.1	−10.5
Majority		314	13.5	−24.7
Turnout		2332	N/A	N/A
Liberal Democrats hold		Swing	N/A	

Heathfield Division
Party	Candidate	Votes	%	±%
Conservative	Rupert Simmons *	2,143	65.6	+8.0
Liberal Democrats	Jim Benson	1123	34.4	−8.0
Majority		1020	31.2	+16.0
Turnout		3266	N/A	N/A
Conservative hold		Swing	N/A	

Hollington & Wishing Tree Division
Party	Candidate	Votes	%	±%
Labour	Phil Scott *	1,132	42.9	−11.1
Conservative	Rob Cooke	793	30.0	+3.9
Liberal Democrats	Chris Benner	369	14.0	−1.0
BNP	Victoria Britton	347	13.1	N/A
Majority		393	12.9	−15.0
Turnout		2641	N/A	N/A
Labour hold		Swing	N/A	

Langney Division
Party	Candidate	Votes	%	±%
Liberal Democrats	Jon Harris *	964	41.2	−12.7
Conservative	Stephanie Walters	564	24.1	−5.0
UKIP	Diane Kefallinos	309	13.2	N/A
Independent	David Tomlinson	284	12.1	N/A
Green	Chris Quarrington	126	5.4	+1.5
Labour	Brigid Jones	94	4.0	−9.1
Majority		400	17.1	−7.7
Turnout		2341	N/A	N/A
Liberal Democrats hold		Swing	N/A	

Lewes Division
Party	Candidate	Votes	%	±%
Independent	Ruth O'Keefe	3,032	64.1	N/A
Liberal Democrats	Michael Charter	867	18.3	−8.3
Conservative	Jim Sheppard	294	6.2	−3.7
Green	Susan Murray	254	5.4	−0.9
Labour	Jonathan Spencer	149	3.1	−6.2
UKIP	Paul Hartfield	136	2.9	N/A
Majority		2165	45.8	+26.2
Turnout		4732	N/A	N/A
Independent hold		Swing	N/A	

Maze Hill & West St Leonards Division
Party	Candidate	Votes	%	±%
Conservative	Joy Waite *	1,358	49.5	+6.0
Liberal Democrats	Tricia Keneally	555	20.2	−0.5
Labour	Alan Roberts	507	18.5	−12.4
BNP	Kenneth Donnelly	324	11.8	N/A
Majority		803	29.3	+16.7
Turnout		2744	N/A	N/A
Conservative hold		Swing	N/A	

Meads Division
Party	Candidate	Votes	%	±%
Conservative	Barry Taylor *	2,001	54.3	−6.0
Liberal Democrats	Margaret Ticehurst	657	17.8	−6.5
UKIP	Ian Cameron	534	14.5	+11.8
Green	Dorothy Forsyth	324	8.8	+3.7
Labour	Dennis Scard	170	4.6	−3.0
Majority		1344	36.5	+0.5
Turnout		3686	N/A	N/A
Conservative hold		Swing	N/A	

Newhaven & Ouse Valley West Division
Party	Candidate	Votes	%	±%
Liberal Democrats	David Rogers *	1,515	48.8	+1.6
Conservative	Melvyn Simmons	703	22.6	−0.7
UKIP	George Cork	494	15.9	N/A
Green	Keith Rapley	256	8.2	+2.5
Labour	Trevor Hopper	136	4.4	−8.4
Majority		812	26.2	+2.3
Turnout		3104	N/A	N/A
Liberal Democrats hold		Swing	N/A	

Northern Rother Division
Party	Candidate	Votes	%	±%
Conservative	Peter Jones *	2,046	55.1	+5.4
Liberal Democrats	Sue Prochak	1503	40.4	+0.8
Labour	Roger Macmillan	167	4.5	−6.3
Majority		543	14.7	+4.6
Turnout		3716	N/A	N/A
Conservative hold		Swing	N/A	

Old Hastings & Tressell Division
Party	Candidate	Votes	%	±%
Labour	Jeremy Birch	1,053	35.4	−5.2
Conservative	Stuart Padget	855	28.7	+3.8
Liberal Democrats	Stuart Murphy	745	25.0	−3.0
BNP	Nicholas Prince	322	10.8	N/A
Majority		198	6.7	−5.9
Turnout		2975	N/A	N/A
Labour hold		Swing	N/A	

Old Town Division
Party	Candidate	Votes	%	±%
Liberal Democrats	Carolyn Heaps	1,990	48.6	−1.5
Conservative	Sandie Howlett	1381	33.7	−3.8
UKIP	Anne Chambers	340	8.3	N/A
Green	Robert Sier	284	6.9	+0.6
Labour	Jean Couture	102	2.5	−3.7
Majority		609	14.9	+2.3
Turnout		4097	N/A	N/A
Liberal Democrats hold		Swing	N/A	

Ouse Valley East Division
Party	Candidate	Votes	%	±%
Liberal Democrats	Pat Ost	1,535	44.4	−2.2
Conservative	George Bishop	1037	30.0	−1.8
UKIP	Ursula Jennet	530	15.3	N/A
Green	Martin Crees	239	6.9	+3.9
Labour	Eric Lambert	118	3.4	−8.2
Majority		498	14.4	−0.4
Turnout		3459	N/A	N/A
Liberal Democrats hold		Swing	N/A	

Peacehaven & Telscombe Towns Division
Party	Candidate	Votes	%	±%
Conservative	Philip Howson *	3,099	54.0	+13.5
Conservative	John Livings *	3,020		
Liberal Democrats	Liz Lee	1054	18.4	−8.5
Liberal Democrats	Darren Grover	924		
Labour	John Carden	875	15.2	−11.1
Labour	Laurence O'Connor	751		
Green	Johnny Denis	715	12.4	+6.1
Green	Nicola McGilligan	705		
Majority		N/A	35.6	+22.0
Turnout		11143	N/A	N/A
Conservative hold		Swing	N/A	
Conservative hold		Swing	N/A	

Pevensey & Westham Division
Party	Candidate	Votes	%	±%
Conservative	Tony Freebody	1,314	44.9	−5.0
UKIP	Michael Pursglove	935	31.9	N/A
Liberal Democrats	Marc Benier	493	16.8	−15.8
Labour	Roy Payea	187	6.4	−11.1
Majority		379	13.0	−4.3
Turnout		2929	N/A	N/A
Conservative hold		Swing	N/A	

Polegate, Willingdon & East Dean Division
Party	Candidate	Votes	%	±%
Independent	Stephen Shing *	3,834	50.9	N/A
Independent	Daniel Shing	3,452		
Conservative	Kirsty Fenton	1734	23.0	−16.4
Conservative	Douglas Murray	1573		
Liberal Democrats	Roy Martin *	1473	19.6	−31.4
Liberal Democrats	Andy Watkins	1035		
UKIP	Alan Ticehurst	493	6.5	N/A
UKIP	Catharine Ticehurst	406		
Majority		N/A	27.9	+16.3
Turnout		14000	N/A	N/A
Independent gain from Liberal Democrats		Swing	N/A	
Independent gain from Liberal Democrats		Swing	N/A	

Ratton Division
Party	Candidate	Votes	%	±%
Conservative	Colin Belsey	1,712	44.3	−7.8
Liberal Democrats	Nicola Grover	1428	36.9	+5.1
UKIP	Roger Needham	403	10.4	+6.7
Green	Izzy Riach	198	5.1	+1.9
Labour	Jake Lambert	125	3.2	−6.1
Majority		284	7.4	−12.9
Turnout		3866	N/A	N/A
Conservative hold		Swing	N/A	

Ringmer & Lewes Bridge Division
Party	Candidate	Votes	%	±%
Liberal Democrats	Rosalyn St Pierre *	2,100	50.1	+6.9
Conservative	Roy Burman	1031	24.6	−6.2
Green	Matt Kent	454	10.8	−3.0
UKIP	Peter Charlton	402	9.6	N/A
Labour	Steve Watts	207	4.9	−7.3
Majority		1069	25.5	+13.1
Turnout		4194	N/A	N/A
Liberal Democrats hold		Swing	N/A	

Rother North West Division
Party	Candidate	Votes	%	±%
Conservative	Anthony Barnes *	1,891	63.8	+7.5
Liberal Democrats	George Hearn	1075	36.2	−7.5
Majority		816	27.6	+15.0
Turnout		2966	N/A	N/A
Conservative hold		Swing	N/A	

Rye & Eastern Rother Division
Party	Candidate	Votes	%	±%
Conservative	Keith Glazier *	1,572	52.8	+6.8
Liberal Democrats	John Smith	1000	33.6	+7.2
Labour	Chris Mears	407	13.7	−13.8
Majority		572	19.2	+0.7
Turnout		2979	N/A	N/A
Conservative hold		Swing	N/A	

St Anthony's Division
Party	Candidate	Votes	%	±%
Liberal Democrats	David Tutt *	1,683	53.4	−4.8
Conservative	Susan Steinberg	736	23.4	−5.3
UKIP	Kenneth Alderton	475	15.1	N/A
Green	Hugh Norris	166	5.3	+1.1
Labour	Ian Culshaw	91	2.9	−5.9
Majority		947	30.0	+0.5
Turnout		3151	N/A	N/A
Liberal Democrats hold		Swing	N/A	

St Helens & Silverhill Division
Party	Candidate	Votes	%	±%
Conservative	Matthew Lock *	1,459	47.9	+9.8
Labour	Nigel Sinden	686	22.5	−14.9
Liberal Democrats	Christopher Beaumont	636	20.9	+4.2
BNP	Neil Jackson	268	8.8	N/A
Majority		773	25.4	+24.7
Turnout		3049	N/A	N/A
Conservative hold		Swing	N/A	

Seaford Blatchington Division
Party	Candidate	Votes	%	±%
Liberal Democrats	Jon Freeman *	1,571	46.9	−1.9
Conservative	Eddie Reynolds	1050	31.4	−0.1
UKIP	Christina Latham	513	15.3	N/A
Green	Patti Broome	215	6.4	+1.3
Majority		521	15.5	−1.8
Turnout		3349	N/A	N/A
Liberal Democrats hold		Swing	N/A	

Seaford Sutton Division
Party	Candidate	Votes	%	±%
Liberal Democrats	Carolyn Lambert	1,584	43.2	+1.3
Conservative	Mike Murphy *	1468	40.1	−4.1
UKIP	Alan Latham	408	11.1	N/A
Green	Roger Murray	203	5.5	+0.6
Majority		116	3.1	+0.8
Turnout		3663	N/A	N/A
Liberal Democrats gain from Conservative		Swing	N/A	

Sovereign Division
Party	Candidate	Votes	%	±%
Conservative	David Elkin *	1,184	33.7	−15.1
Liberal Democrats	Susan Morris	989	28.2	−15.9
Independent	Rick Runalls	809	23.0	N/A
UKIP	Patricia Porte	343	9.8	N/A
Green	Harry Boys	117	3.3	−3.7
Labour	Davies Mieres	68	1.9	N/A
Majority		195	5.5	−2.2
Turnout		3510	N/A	N/A
Conservative hold		Swing	N/A	

Uckfield Division
Party	Candidate	Votes	%	±%
Liberal Democrats	Paul Sparks *	2,580	88.5	+41.8
Labour	Leonard Ashby	334	11.5	−5.8
Majority		2246	77.0	+66.3
Turnout		2914	N/A	N/A
Liberal Democrats hold		Swing	N/A	

Upperton Division
Party	Candidate	Votes	%	±%
Liberal Democrats	Pat Rodohan	1,491	43.1	+8.6
Conservative	Anne Angel	1352	39.1	−9.8
UKIP	Geraldine MacKillop	274	7.9	N/A
Green	Susan Montague	253	7.3	+0.2
Labour	Elizabeth Goude	90	2.6	−6.9
Majority		139	4.0	−10.4
Turnout		3460	N/A	N/A
Liberal Democrats gain from Conservative		Swing	N/A	

Wadhurst Division
Party	Candidate	Votes	%	±%
Conservative	Bob Tidy *	2,640	64.8	+8.3
Green	Beth Martin	800	19.7	+11.1
Liberal Democrats	Bob Sweetland	631	15.5	−9.2
Majority		1840	45.1	+13.3
Turnout		4071	N/A	N/A
Conservative hold		Swing	N/A	
