= Grade II* listed buildings in Lewes (district) =

Lewes shown within East Sussex

There are over 20,000 Grade II* listed buildings in England. This page is a list of these buildings in the district of Lewes in East Sussex.

== Lewes ==
Name	Location	Type	Completed (Note: The date given is the date used by Historic England as significant for the initial building or that of an important part in the structure's description.)	Date designated	Grid ref. (Note: The grid reference is based on the British national grid reference system, sometimes known as OSGB36, used by the Ordnance Survey.) Geo-coordinates	Entry number (Note: The "List Entry Number" is a unique number assigned to each listed building and scheduled monument by Historic England.)	Image
St Anne's House, 111 High Street and Railings to North	Lewes	House and Offices	Early 18th century	25 February 1952	TQ4110709969; 50°52′19″N 0°00′15″E	1043804	St Anne's House, 111 High Street and Railings to North More images
The Parish Church of St Mary	Barcombe, Lewes	Church	1100 circa	20 August 1965	TQ4187014309; 50°54′39″N 0°01′00″E	1043993	The Parish Church of St Mary More images
Itford Farmhouse	Itford, Beddingham, Lewes	House	Medieval	20 August 1965	TQ4332805498; 50°49′53″N 0°02′02″E	1352945	Itford Farmhouse More images
1 Coppard's Bridge	Chailey, Lewes	Timber Framed House	Built c1475	27 September 1979	TQ4001319559; 50°57′30″N 0°00′28″W	1043978	1 Coppard's Bridge More images
The Parish Church of St Peter	Chailey Green, Chailey, Lewes	Church	13th century	20 August 1965	TQ3922019339; 50°57′24″N 0°01′09″W	1352947	The Parish Church of St Peter More images
Wapsbourne	Sheffield Park, Chailey, Lewes	Timber Framed House	Early 17th century	17 March 1952	TQ3996123405; 50°59′35″N 0°00′25″W	1352974	Wapsbourne More images
Cotterlings	Ditchling, Lewes	House	Refronted 1790	20 August 1965	TQ3245415221; 50°55′17″N 0°07′01″W	1275640	Cotterlings More images
Chapel Farmhouse	East Chiltington, Lewes	Farmhouse	16th century	17 March 1952	TQ3686315094; 50°55′09″N 0°03′15″W	1275609	Chapel Farmhouse
The Parish Church	East Chiltington, Lewes	Anglican Church	12th century	20 August 1965	TQ3699015125; 50°55′10″N 0°03′09″W	1043970	The Parish Church More images
Barn to the East of Court Farmhouse	Falmer, Lewes	Barn	16th century	17 March 1952	TQ3555808778; 50°51′45″N 0°04′31″W	1275514	Upload Photo
The Parish Church of St Laurence	Falmer, Lewes	Anglican Church	1817	20 August 1965	TQ3549108744; 50°51′44″N 0°04′34″W	1352989	The Parish Church of St Laurence More images
Charleston	Firle, Lewes	House	18th century	20 August 1965	TQ4903606926; 50°50′34″N 0°06′56″E	1043946	Charleston More images
Stables of Firle Place to West of the House & Firle Place Riding School	Firle, Lewes	Gate	Late 18th century or early 19th century	17 March 1952	TQ4720307111; 50°50′41″N 0°05′22″E	1275469	Stables of Firle Place to West of the House & Firle Place Riding School
The Garden Wall with Carriage Entrance, South East of Glynde Place	Glynde, Lewes	Gate	Between 1755 and 1760	20 August 1965	TQ4566709309; 50°51′54″N 0°04′07″E	1043919	The Garden Wall with Carriage Entrance, South East of Glynde Place
The Parish Church of St Mary the Virgin	Glynde, Lewes	Anglican Church	1763-5	20 August 1965	TQ4564709267; 50°51′52″N 0°04′06″E	1043918	The Parish Church of St Mary the Virgin More images
Coombe Place	Offham, Hamsey, Lewes	Farmhouse	1657	17 March 1952	TQ3932012317; 50°53′37″N 0°01′13″W	1221911	Upload Photo
Hamsey House Cottage Yeomans	Hamsey, Lewes	House	19th century	20 August 1965	TQ4111112559; 50°53′43″N 0°00′19″E	1222113	Upload Photo
Hamsey Place Farmhouse	Hamsey, Lewes	Farmhouse	16th century	17 March 1952	TQ4117712248; 50°53′33″N 0°00′21″E	1274819	Upload Photo
Offham House	Offham, Hamsey, Lewes	House	Possibly 1676	17 March 1952	TQ3988812374; 50°53′38″N 0°00′44″W	1221909	Offham House
Iford Grange and Stables adjoining to North West	Iford, Lewes	House	Early 19th century	20 August 1965	TQ4063407268; 50°50′52″N 0°00′13″W	1274761	Iford Grange and Stables adjoining to North West More images
The Parish Church of St Pancras	Kingston near Lewes, Lewes	Church	Early 14th century	20 August 1965	TQ3914408167; 50°51′23″N 0°01′28″W	1222327	The Parish Church of St Pancras More images
All Saints' Community Centre	Lewes	Former parish church	Early 16th century	25 February 1952	TQ4175810024; 50°52′20″N 0°00′48″E	1191009	All Saints' Community Centre More images
Anne of Cleves House	Southover, Lewes, Lewes	House	Late 15th century or early 16th century	25 February 1952	TQ4111309633; 50°52′08″N 0°00′15″E	1043733	Anne of Cleves House More images
Barbican House	Lewes	House	Later 16th century	25 February 1952	TQ4140710042; 50°52′21″N 0°00′30″E	1043818	Barbican House More images
Bull House	Lewes	House	16th century	25 February 1952	TQ4129009967; 50°52′19″N 0°00′24″E	1191309	Bull House More images
Castle Place Nos 165 and 167, and Railings	Lewes	Row House	1810	25 February 1952	TQ4137810026; 50°52′21″N 0°00′29″E	1353051	Castle Place Nos 165 and 167, and Railings More images
Church of St Thomas at Cliffe	Cliffe, Lewes	Church	12th century	25 February 1952	TQ4213210272; 50°52′28″N 0°01′08″E	1043870	Church of St Thomas at Cliffe More images
Crown Hotel	Lewes	Hotel	Late 18th century	25 February 1952	TQ4158410164; 50°52′25″N 0°00′39″E	1191714	Crown Hotel More images
Harveys Brewery	Cliffe, Lewes	Tower	Early 19th century	29 October 1985	TQ4197810289; 50°52′29″N 0°01′00″E	1043864	Harveys Brewery More images
Lamb House	Cliffe, Lewes	House	Mid 18th century	25 March 1952	TQ4220510271; 50°52′28″N 0°01′11″E	1190338	Lamb House More images
Lewes Crown Court	Lewes	County Hall	1808-1812	25 February 1952	TQ4150210114; 50°52′24″N 0°00′35″E	1043780	Lewes Crown Court More images
Lewes House	Lewes	House	Early 18th century	25 February 1952	TQ4166310147; 50°52′24″N 0°00′43″E	1353052	Lewes House More images
Malling Deanery	Malling, Lewes	House	Possibly earlier	25 February 1952	TQ4130710938; 50°52′50″N 0°00′26″E	1353012	Malling Deanery More images
Pelham House and Wall to South	Lewes	House	16th century	25 February 1952	TQ4147810005; 50°52′20″N 0°00′34″E	1043747	Pelham House and Wall to South More images
School Hill House	Lewes	House	Late 17th century	25 February 1952	TQ4164610141; 50°52′24″N 0°00′43″E	1043822	School Hill House More images
Shelley's Hotel and Railings to South	Lewes	House	16th century	25 February 1952	TQ4110110004; 50°52′20″N 0°00′14″E	1191443	Shelley's Hotel and Railings to South More images
Southover Grange	Lewes	House	1572	25 February 1952	TQ4132009834; 50°52′15″N 0°00′25″E	1192300	Southover Grange More images
St Swithun House	Lewes	House	Early 18th century	25 February 1952	TQ4136209995; 50°52′20″N 0°00′28″E	1043837	Upload Photo
The Caprons and Railings to West	Lewes	House	Early to mid 18th century	25 February 1952	TQ4130609857; 50°52′15″N 0°00′25″E	1286853	The Caprons and Railings to West
Tyne House and Railings to South	Lewes	House	c. 1720	25 February 1952	TQ4118809999; 50°52′20″N 0°00′19″E	1191493	Tyne House and Railings to South More images
War Memorial	Lewes	War Memorial	1922	27 October 2014	TQ4159610140; 50°52′24″N 0°00′40″E	1191738	War Memorial More images
Westgate Chapel	Lewes	Chapel	1583	25 February 1952	TQ4129309954; 50°52′19″N 0°00′24″E	1043839	Westgate Chapel More images
Church of St Leonard	Denton, Newhaven, Lewes	Bell Tower	Possibly earlier-Pre 13th century	20 May 1949	TQ4545102580; 50°48′16″N 0°03′46″E	1197491	Church of St Leonard More images
Church of St Michael and All Angels	Newhaven, Lewes	Parish Church	Norman	20 May 1949	TQ4426101128; 50°47′30″N 0°02′43″E	1206261	Church of St Michael and All Angels More images
Founthill Farm	Newick, Lewes	Farmhouse	Early 16th century	17 March 1952	TQ4209620264; 50°57′51″N 0°01′20″E	1238009	Upload Photo
Newick Park	Newick Park, Newick, Lewes	House	c. 1560	17 March 1952	TQ4215219504; 50°57′27″N 0°01′21″E	1274385	Newick Park More images
The Manor House	Newick, Lewes	Farmhouse	17th century	17 March 1952	TQ4207220789; 50°58′08″N 0°01′19″E	1274449	Upload Photo
The Parish Church of St Mary	Newick, Lewes	Church	11th century	20 August 1965	TQ4216320824; 50°58′09″N 0°01′24″E	1237870	The Parish Church of St Mary More images
Plumpton Place	Plumpton, Lewes	House	17th century	17 March 1952	TQ3604513453; 50°54′16″N 0°03′59″W	1274171	Plumpton Place More images
Upper Mill	Plumpton, Lewes	Mill House	17th century or earlier	20 August 1965	TQ3629314746; 50°54′58″N 0°03′45″W	1238553	Upload Photo
Little Manor	Ringmer, Lewes	House	Earlier	17 March 1952	TQ4451712317; 50°53′32″N 0°03′12″E	1238797	Little Manor
The Rectory	Rodmell, Lewes	House	Possibly 19th century	27 September 1979	TQ4201406173; 50°50′16″N 0°00′56″E	1273921	The Rectory More images
The Parish Church of St Peter	Seaford, Lewes	Parish Church	13th century	2 March 1950	TV4839999819; 50°46′44″N 0°06′13″E	1044020	The Parish Church of St Peter More images
Manor Farmhouse and the Garden Wall to North and West of the House	South Heighton, South Heighton, Lewes	Farmhouse	18th century	20 August 1965	TQ4504902905; 50°48′27″N 0°03′26″E	1239546	Upload Photo
Ashcombe House	Ashcombe House, St. Ann (Without), Lewes	Farmhouse	18th century	17 March 1952	TQ3876109568; 50°52′08″N 0°01′46″W	1273885	Upload Photo
Streat Place	Streat, Lewes	House	Between 1607 and 1627	20 August 1965	TQ3505215229; 50°55′15″N 0°04′48″W	1239638	Streat Place More images
The Parish Church	Streat, Lewes	Church	c. 1200	20 August 1965	TQ3508515179; 50°55′13″N 0°04′46″W	1239635	The Parish Church More images
The Parish Church of St Martin	Westmeston, Lewes	Church	12th century	20 August 1965	TQ3388813639; 50°54′24″N 0°05′50″W	1222779	The Parish Church of St Martin More images
The Parish Church of St Peter and St John the Baptist	Wivelsfield, Lewes	Church	From Saxon to Perpendicular	20 August 1965	TQ3383920784; 50°58′15″N 0°05′43″W	1222972	The Parish Church of St Peter and St John the Baptist More images
Theobalds	Burgess Hill, Wivelsfield, Lewes	House	17th century or earlier	17 March 1952	TQ3258620633; 50°58′12″N 0°06′47″W	1223095	Theobalds
Ditchling War Memorial	Ditchling	War memorial	1919	12 October 2016	TQ3243515250; 50°55′17″N 0°07′02″W	1438295	Ditchling War Memorial More images
