= Sussex County Council =

Sussex County Council may refer to:

- East Sussex County Council, England, from 1889
- West Sussex County Council, England, from 1889
- Sussex, England, until 1889
- Sussex County, Delaware#Government, USA

== See also ==
- Suffolk County Council, England
- Surrey County Council, England
