= List of people with ME/CFS =

This is a list of notable people who have been diagnosed with or suspected to have myalgic encephalomyelitis/chronic fatigue syndrome (ME/CFS).

== Confirmed diagnosis ==
Name	Occupation	Nationality
Michelle Akers	Olympic soccer player	American
Karin Alvtegen	Author	Swedish
Paul Atherton	Television and film producer	British
Elisabeth Tova Bailey	Author	American
Ann Bannon	Author	American
Richie Barnett	Rugby League player and television presenter	New Zealander
Henrik Berggren	Lead singer in the band Broder Daniel	Swedish
Emma Blackery	YouTuber and singer-songwriter	British
Susan Blackmore	Writer and lecturer	British
Howard Bloom	Publicist and writer	American
Olaf Bodden	Professional soccer player	German
Jennifer Brea	Documentary filmmaker and activist	American
Ricky Carmichael	Motocross racer	American
Cher	Recording artist, actress, director, and record producer	American
Pema Chödrön	Buddhist nun	American
Susanna Clarke	Author	British
Tom Clarke	Politician	British
Neil Codling	Keyboard player for the band Suede	British
Yvette Cooper	Politician	British
Dianna Cowern	YouTuber and science communicator	American
Merryn Crofts	Drama student whose death was caused by ME/CFS	British
Michael Crawford	Actor and singer	British
Marina Diamandis	Singer-Songwriter	British
Mia Diekow	Musician, voice actress, patient advocate	German
Beth Dobbin	Olympic sprinter	British
Laura Dundovic	Former Miss Universe Australia	Australian
Blake Edwards	Film director, screenwriter and producer	American
Florian-Ayala Fauna	Artist, musician, music producer	American
Flea (Michael Balzary)	Bassist of the Red Hot Chili Peppers	Australian-American
Clare Francis	Yachtswoman and novelist	British
Luke Ford	Journalist and blogger	Australian-American
Ilko-Sascha Kowalczuk	German historian and author	German
Leigh Hatcher	Journalist and news presenter	Australian
Susan Harris	Television writer and producer	American
Miranda Hart	Actress, comedian and writer	British
Jens Höing	Racing driver	German
Laura Hillenbrand	Author	American
Andy Hunt	Association footballer	British
Martin Jacques	Academic and writer	British
Keith Jarrett	Jazz pianist	American
Leonard A. Jason	Professor of psychology at DePaul University	American
Stephan Jenkins	Lead singer of Third Eye Blind	American
Brynmor John	Politician	British
Roger King	Novelist	British living in US
Trip Lee	Rapper	American
Peter Marshall	Squash player	British
Brooks Mileson	Businessman	British
Sophia Mirza	A woman who was the first to have CFS listed as a cause of death in the UK	British
Stuart Murdoch	Musician, lead singer in the band Belle and Sebastian	British (Scottish)
Stevie Nicks	American singer-songwriter	American
Andrew Oldcorn	Golfer	British
Ronald Page	the plaintiff of Page v Smith	British
Amy Peterson	Short track speed skater	American
Martin Phillips	Association footballer	British
David Puttnam	British film maker and producer	British
John Rutter	Composer	British
Bradley Simmonds	Radio DJ, host	New Zealander
Ali Smith	Author	British
Casey Stoner	MotoGP world champion	Australian
Amy Studt	Musician	British
Ari Taub	Olympic Greco-Roman wrestler	Canadian
Vlad Vexler	Philosopher and political commentator	British
Marina Weisband	Politician	German
Doug Walker	Comedian and Film Critic	American
Naomi Weisstein	Author and neuroscientist	American
Ken Wilber	Author	American
Chris Willsher	Singer with The Bus Station Loonies	British
Katharine Windsor	Duchess of Kent	British

== Suspected cases ==
Name	Occupation	Nationality
Harlan Ellison	Science-fiction writer	American

== See also ==
- List of people with long COVID
