= Lewes Crown Court =

County building in Lewes, East Sussex, England

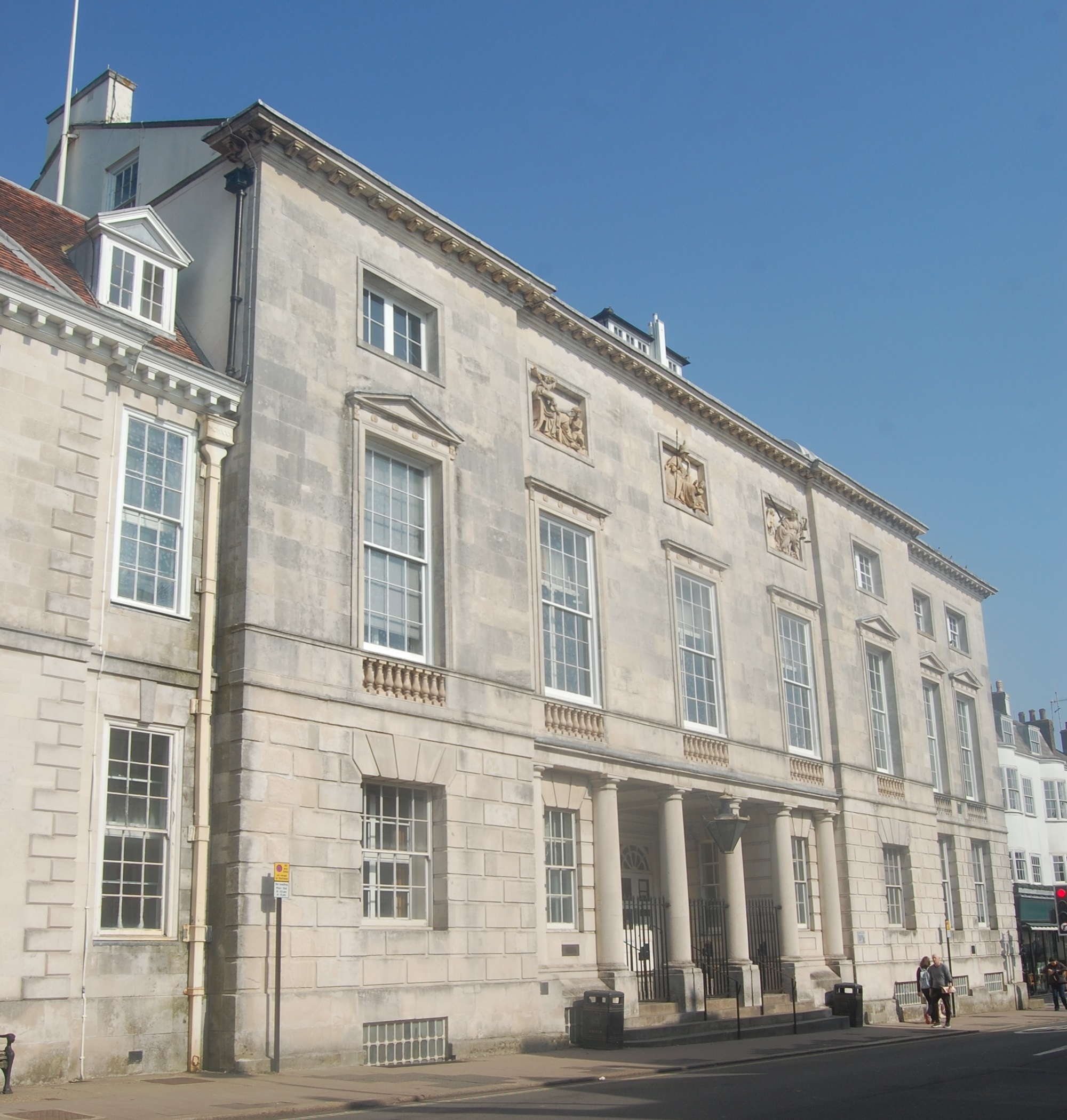
- Lewes Crown Court in 2022

- Location within East Sussex
- 50.8730°N 0.0096°E
- Location: Lewes, East Sussex

History
- Built: 1812

Site notes
- Architect: John Johnson
- Architectural style: Classical style

Listed Building – Grade II*
- Designated: 25 February 1952
- Reference no.: 1043780

Lewes Crown Court is a Crown Court venue in Lewes High Street, Lewes, East Sussex, England. It forms part of the Lewes Combined Court Centre which it shares with Lewes County Court. The building, which was known as the "County Hall" from an early stage, was also the headquarters of East Sussex County Council from 1889 to 1938: it is a Grade II* listed building.

== History ==
The building, which was designed by John Johnson in the classical style, was built in Portland stone between 1808 and 1812. The design for the building involved a symmetrical main frontage of five bays facing the High Street; the central section of three bays featured a recess with six Doric order columns supporting the upper floors; there were casement windows on the first floor and flanking wings which slightly projected forwards. Above the first floor windows were reliefs which depicted Wisdom, Justice and Mercy. The building was extended by two bays to the east in a similar style later in the 19th century. The building was known as "County Hall" from an early stage.

The structure was originally used as a facility for dispensing justice but, following the implementation of the Local Government Act 1888, which established county councils in every county, it also became the meeting place of East Sussex County Council. The county council moved Pelham House in 1938, from when the building in Lewes High Street was used solely for accommodating the assize courts. The county council then moved on from Pelham House to St Anne's Crescent in Lewes in 1968. Following the implementation of the Courts Act 1971, the former assizes court was re-designated Lewes Crown Court.

== Cases ==
Notable cases held at Lewes Assizes, later Lewes Crown Court, include:

- 1920: The "Crumbles Murder case" in which Jack Field and William Thomas were convicted of the murder of Irene Munro
- 1930: The trial of Sidney Harry Fox for the murder of his mother for insurance money
- 1934: The acquittal of Tony Mancini for the "Brighton Trunk Murder" of Violet Kaye, to which he later confessed
- 1949: John Haigh, the "acid bath murderer"
- 1956: John Bodkin Adams, previously acquitted of murder at the Old Bailey, was tried at Lewes for collateral offences
- 1998: Trial of Sion Jenkins for the murder of Billie-Jo Jenkins (later acquitted)
- 2001: Roy Whiting was tried and convicted of the murder of Sarah Payne
- 2004: Graham Coutts was tried and convicted of the murder of schoolteacher Jane Longhurst
- 2004: Andrew Wragg was acquitted of murdering his son and sentenced to two years for manslaughter
- 2009: Martin and Nathan Winter, and their company Alpha Fireworks Ltd, were found guilty of the manslaughter of two East Sussex Fire & Rescue Service firefighters in the 2006 Marlie Farm Fireworks Explosion
- 2010: Bridget Kathleen Gilderdale was acquitted of the attempted murder of her daughter, Lynn Gilderdale (an ME sufferer)
