= East Sussex County Hall =

County building in Lewes, East Sussex, England

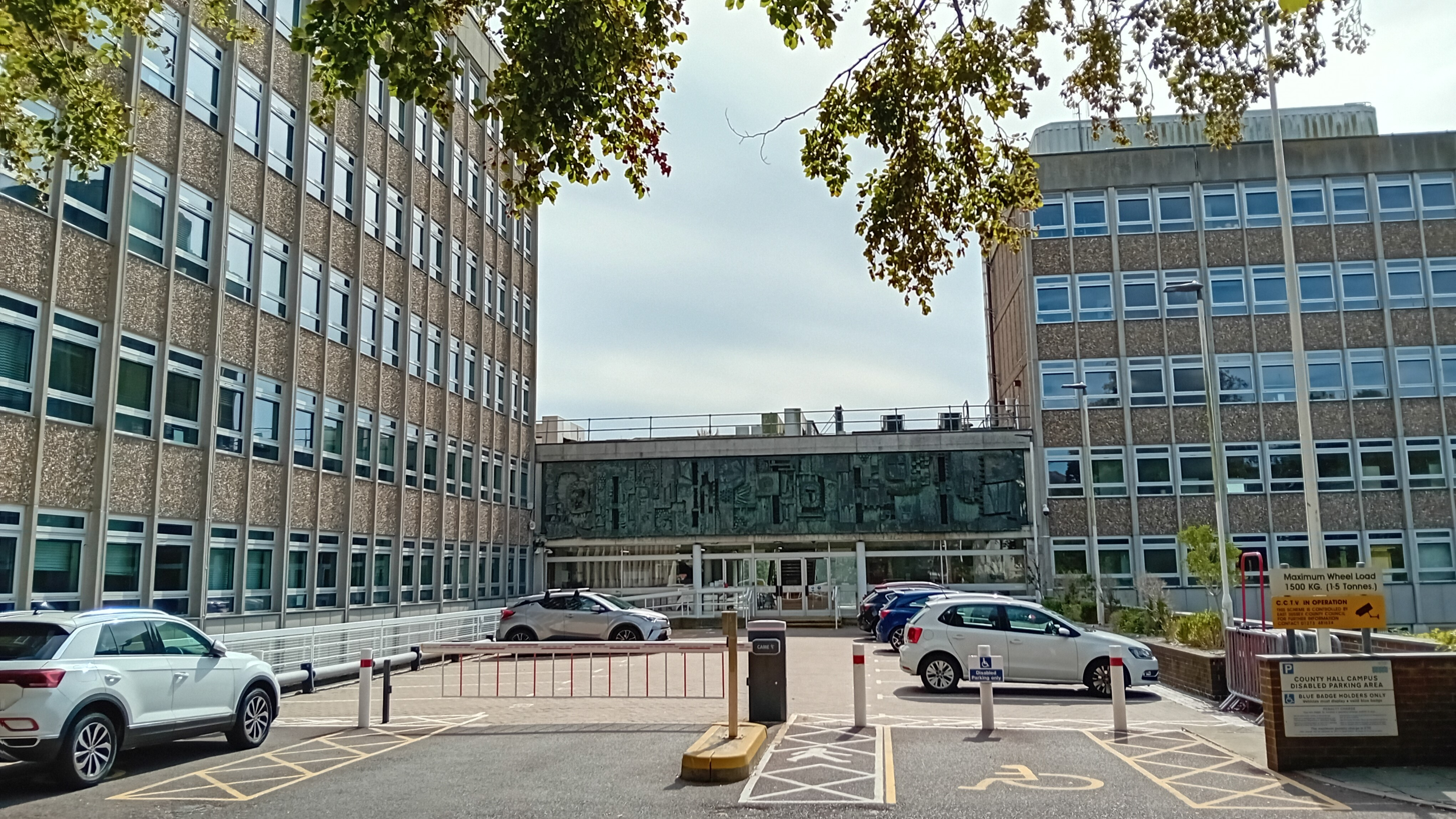
- County Hall: main entrance

- Location within East Sussex

General information
- Architectural style: Modern style
- Location: St Anne's Crescent, Lewes, United Kingdom
- Coordinates: 50°52′18.6″N 0°0′3.6″E
- Completed: 1968

Design and construction
- Architect: Jack Catchpole

East Sussex County Hall is a modern building in St Anne's Crescent, Lewes, East Sussex. It is the headquarters of East Sussex County Council and also serves as the meeting place of Lewes District Council.

== History ==
After being based at County Hall in the High Street in Lewes since its formation in 1889, East Sussex County Council relocated to Pelham House in Lewes in 1938. After deciding that Pelham House was too restricted for future expansion, county leaders chose to procure a new purpose-built county headquarters: the site they selected was open land located between St Anne's Church and the Old Southover Rectory which became known as St Anne's Crescent.

The new building, which was designed by the county architect, Jack Catchpole, in the modern style, was opened by the Duchess of Kent on 31 October 1968. The opening ceremony also involved a dedication service which was led by Roger Wilson, the Bishop of Chichester, assisted by John Habgood, the Rector of St. Anne's Church.

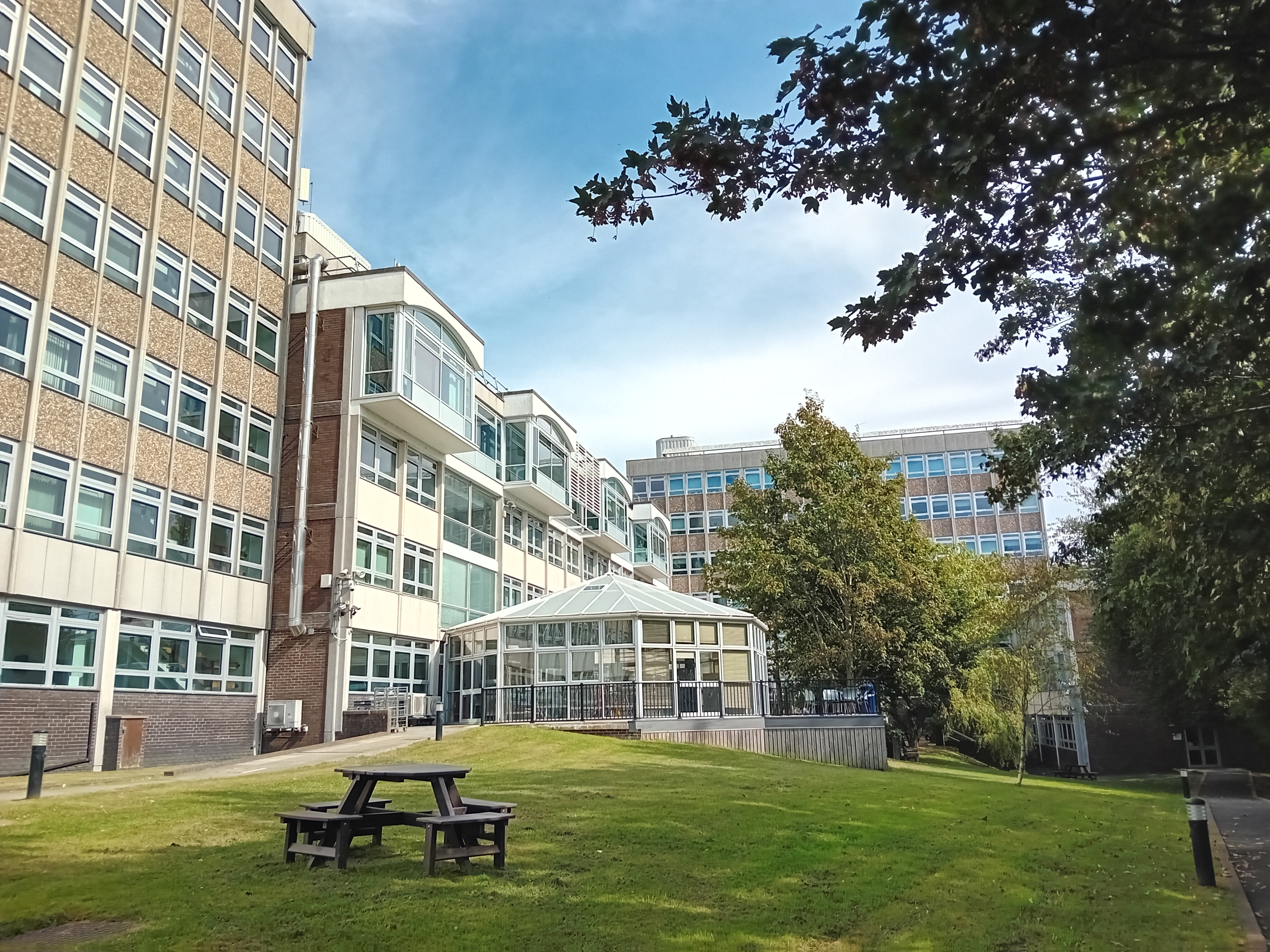
Rear (south) elevation

The design involved a three winged structure joined by a north-facing entrance block; each of the three wings had a continuous band of glazing on each of the six floors with flintwork panels above and below the glazing. The two-storey entrance block featured a glazed entrance on the first floor with a large decorative panel designed by William George Mitchell on the second floor extending right across the entrance. The abstract design of the 12 meters (39 ft) wide decorative panel, which was made from coloured fibreglass, was intended to recognise the diverse activities of the county council. Although most county council departments were co-located at St Anne's Crescent, the chief executive's department and the legal and community services department remained at Pelham House; the county council also continued to use the council chamber at Pelham House for full meetings of the county council for the rest of the 20th century.

A new council chamber was created on the first floor at St Anne's Crescent, so allowing most activities to be consolidated at that location, in October 2003. Exceptions included the County Archives which were moved from Pelham House into temporary facilities before being transferred to The Keep in Brighton in October 2013. Since 2013 the council chamber at County Hall has also been used by Lewes District Council for its meetings.
