= List of androgynous people =

This is a list of notable people who have been described at any time as androgynous in their persona or presentation, either by self-identification or in reliable sources.

== List ==
Person	Described by reliable source(s)	Self-identified	Comment
ADONXS			Slovak singer, model and dancer
Amanda Lear			French singer, songwriter, painter, television personality, actress, and former model
Anita Berber			Dancer, actress, and artist, married to Sebastian Droste (below)
ANOHNI			British singer, songwriter and visual artist
Ashnikko			American rapper, singer and songwriter
Børns			American singer
Bladee			Swedish rapper, singer and designer
Marc Bolan			British musician
David Bowie			British musician
Leigh Bowery			Australian performance artist
Boy George			English singer and DJ
Pete Burns			English pop musician
Claude Cahun			French photographer
Betty Catroux			French fashion model
Richard Chamberlain			American actor and singer
Charly Boy			Nigerian singer and TV presenter
Gwendoline Christie			English actress and model
Christine and the Queens			French singer
Cara Cunningham			American internet celebrity
Miley Cyrus			American singer and actress
Desireless			French singer
Marlene Dietrich			German-American actress
Sebastian Droste			Dancer, married to Anita Berber (above)
Ecco2k			British-Swedish singer, designer, model and director
Florian-Ayala Fauna			American artist, musician, music producer
Noel Fielding			English comedy actor and TV presenter
Elsa von Freytag-Loringhoven			German avant-garde artist
Marla Glen			American singer
Bilal Hassani			French singer
Elly Jackson			English singer in La Roux
Grace Jones			Jamaican actor, model, and singer
Bill Kaulitz			German singer in Tokio Hotel
Kaya			Japanese visual kei singer
Else Lasker-Schüler			German-Jewish poet
Jiz Lee			American pornographic performer
Annie Lennox			Scottish musician
AzMarie Livingston			American model
Marilyn Manson		"In the beginning, I was never intending to be androgynous"	American musician
Marilyn			English singer
Kristen McMenamy			American model
Brian Molko			British-American musician
Zeki Müren			Turkish singer and actor
Klaus Nomi			German countertenor singer
Genesis P-Orridge			English musician and performing artist
Andreja Pejić			Serbian-Australian model
Prince			American musician
Tilda Swinton			Scottish actress
Sylvester			American singer
David Sylvian			Singer in the band Japan
Gerard Way			American singer, songwriter, and comic book writer
Wilgefortis			a bearded female folk saint depicted crucified, whose legend arose in the 14th century
Andrew Wood			American musician

== See also ==
- Lists of LGBT people
  - List of people with non-binary gender identities
