= Florian-Ayala Fauna =

American artist, musician, poet, and music producer

- Born: Norfolk, Virginia
- Origin: United States
- Genres: Ambient music Dark ambient Experimental music Industrial music Noise music Post-industrial
- Years active: 2007–present
- Website: www.florian-93.com

Florian-Ayala Fauna is an American artist, musician, poet, and music producer. Fauna is the main member of the post-industrial music project uncertain.

== Personal life ==
Florian-Ayala Fauna was born in Norfolk, Virginia. At age 5, Fauna moved to Bombay Beach, California, in Southern California along the Salton Sea. She credits the place as an inspiration to her music. She described it as a "post-apocalyptic-looking town". At age 12, she began experimenting with sampling and rough recordings with a microphone.

In 2002, Fauna lived in the exurb community of Indio, California. At age 21, she moved to Buffalo, New York, where she has been part of Buffalo's experimental art and music scene. Fauna experiences esoteric visions which is involved in her art due to temporal lobe epilepsy. She has chronic fatigue syndrome and is intersex, which plays a role in much of her art. She is trans-femme and uses she/her pronouns.

== Art ==
"Things that are sacred, profane, or some combination of the two. Fragility, purity, and decay are important subjects in my work. Nature is also a noteworthy aspect of my work as well."

— Florian-Ayala Fauna

Fauna is a multidisciplinary artist whose work has been exhibited at the Centre Georges Pompidou in Paris, France, a Coil-themed exhibition in Berlin, Germany, and in the United Kingdom as well as locally in Buffalo, New York. Fauna's artwork utilizes collage, film, painting, photography, and poetry. Her work includes occult, psychedelia, chaos and spiritual enlightenment. Animal imagery include deer, foxes, goats, hares, birds, and wolves. She cites the Surrealists as an influence.

== Music ==
=== uncertain ===
In 2007, uncertain began as the solo project of Florian-Ayala Fauna. Initially, she made ambient and drone music with the computer programme Ableton. Her first album glass fawn was an ambient soundscape about a deer getting lost. It often involved field recordings, processed sounds, and tape loops while their current cycle (since 2012) features albums about a family of foxes done with composition, sampling, and complex music production on Ableton Live and Kontakt. Influences include Aleister Crowley, Hermeticism, Arvo Pärt, Coil, Current 93, Throbbing Gristle, and alchemy. As of 2016, Fauna is the main producer and collaborates with others, primarily with Felix Keigh who is her fiancé and main vocalist.

=== Live performances ===
uncertain started doing live performances in 2013. Cities for live performances have included Boston, Cincinnati, Columbus, Ohio, and New York City. However, her chronic fatigue limits touring. They use visuals such as the use of animal masks, candles, lights, video projections, and ritualistic costumes. Live shows have included performances alongside TRNSGNDR/VHS.

=== Collaborations ===
Fauna has collaborated with former Coil member Stephen Thrower (Cyclobe, UnicaZürn), Esperik Glare's Charlie Martineau (In Serpents and Seas), and others. Thrower contributed an opening track to her 2016 album Dark Night of the Soul. She has also frequently done artwork for Swiss post-industrial musicians and artists Black Sun Productions. Her most recent collaboration was with London-based industrial hip hop artist Ubik MCDXCII, providing production work for the track "Rites and Ceremonies" on his album "Blackout Blinds".

== Reception ==
In February 2013, Orange County, California alternative weekly OC Weekly's Dave Barton called dancing with the blind (lost children) "atmospheric and haunting" and "one of the most evocative titles for an album I've ever heard". In August 2016, The Public's Cory Perla described both her art and music as "otherworldly". In March 2017, British music magazine The Quietus's Russell Cuzner summed up her music as "somehow fulfil[s] a similar aesthetic to the artist's equally prolific visual art that often depict animal heads [...] as if charged with some kind of hidden power, part gothic horror, part Gnostic totem". In December 2019, Columbus Alive's Andy Downing said God Is a Man Eater was "dense, buzzing, six-track song cycle".

== Politics ==
Fauna supports anti-fascism and identifies as an anarchist.

== Discography ==
Title	Release	Record label (Catalogue number)
glass fawn	2009 or 11 January 2010	N/A
small cold hands	6 April 2010	N/A
amniotic fluid EP	20 February 2011	Sparrow's Tongue Records
seahorse (abyssopelagic)	23 February 2011	N/A
grief: silence in five movements	23 May 2011	Sparrow's Tongue Records (spar004)
æther: musick for moths	1 January 2012	N/A
phoenix rising EP	1 February 2012	N/A
Warm Leatherette (a cover version of The Normal)	9 April 2012	Sparrow's Tongue Records
very friendly (a cover version of Throbbing Gristle)	23 April 2012	Sparrow's Tongue Records
nocturnal	1 May 2012	Sparrow's Tongue Records
dancing with the blind (lost children)	1 January 2013	Sparrow's Tongue Records (spar008)
phantoms of the trench warfare (past lives in black flames)	20 March 2013	Sparrow's Tongue Records (spar009)
crawling through the abyss (perdurabo)	23 October 2013	Sparrow's Tongue Records (spar010)
the cycle of tears (moon)	23 September 2014	N/A
uncertain presents ‡ black-stag's-lament ‡ - the vision of sorrow ep	10 December 2014	N/A
Horns and Teeth (Blood Rite)	16 January 2015	N/A
Black Forest Invocation (Astaroth) - Live at Black Forest Invocation	22 February 2015	N/A
The Fox's Blood Moon (for Ian Johnstone)	23 July 2015	N/A
The Price of Existence Is Eternal Warfare (Live Invocations)	31 October 2015	Wraith Productions (886445526660)
transnoise aktion no. 001 - 05.21.2016	2016	N/A
The Veins were Licked by the Vulpine Garden	5 June 2016	N/A
transnoise aktion no. 003 - 08.04.2016	2016	N/A
transnoise aktion no. 004 - 08.26.2016	2016	N/A
Transnoise Aktion no. 005 - 09.02.2016	4 September 2016	N/A
The Crown of the Mother Elk	26 September 2016	N/A
black stag's lament	3 December 2016	N/A
dark night of the soul (the pile of bodies)	22 December 2016	N/A
The Surgeon Was a Butcher	5 July 2017	N/A
Child Covered in Needles (She Is Dancing and Blind)	5 August 2017	N/A
God Is a Man Eater	30 October 2019	N/A

== See also ==
- List of ambient music artists
- List of androgynous people
- List of dark ambient artists
- List of experimental musicians
- List of noise musicians
- List of people from Buffalo, New York
- List of people from Hampton Roads, Virginia
- List of people from Virginia
- List of people with chronic fatigue syndrome
- List of transgender people
- List of intersex people
