= Roger King (novelist) =

English novelist and filmmaker

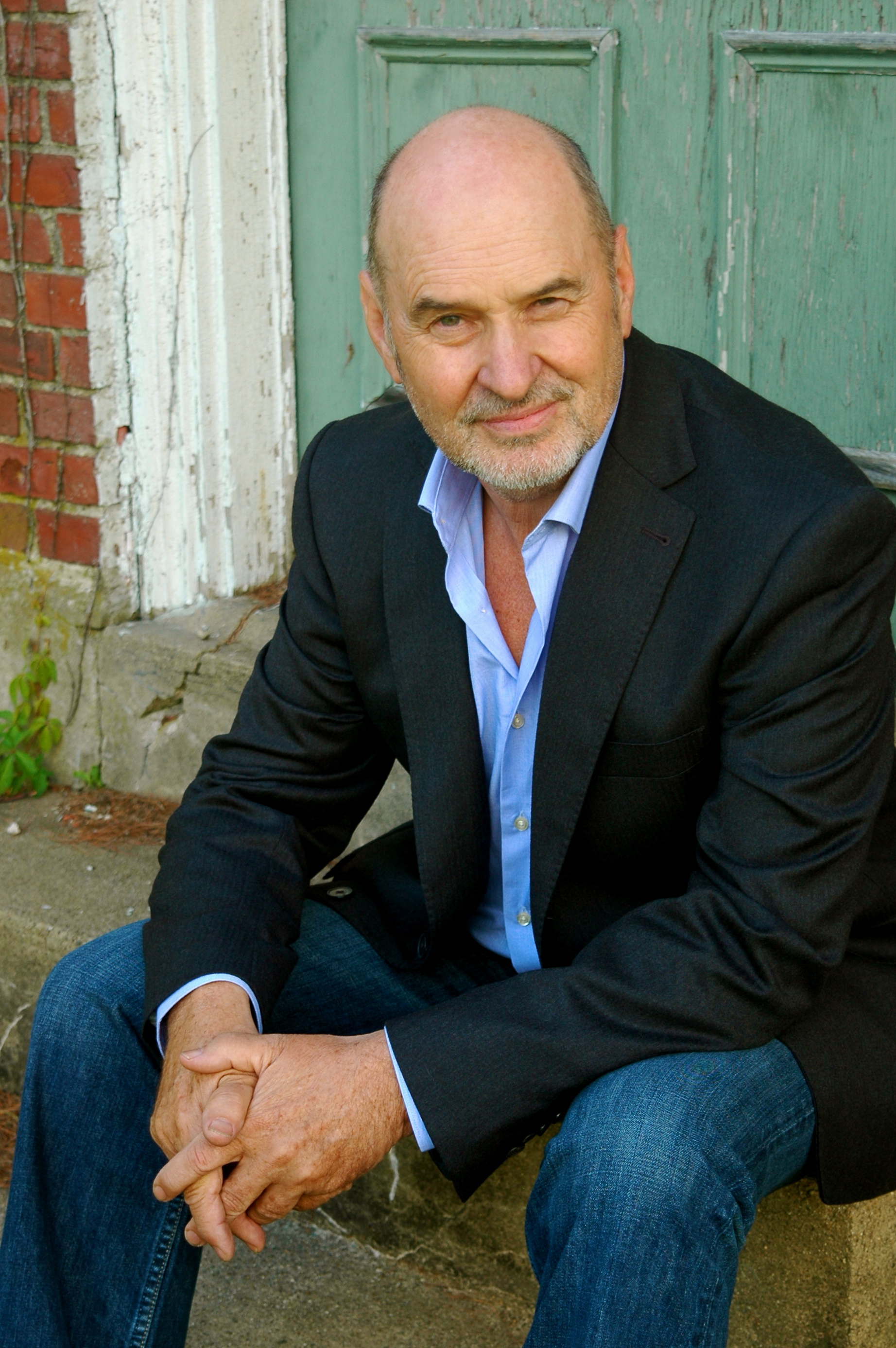
- Born: 14 March 1947 (age 79); Forty Hill in the London Borough of Enfield, UK
- Occupations: Novelist, filmmaker, economist
- Website: rogerking.org

Roger Frank Graham King (born 14 March 1947) is an English novelist and filmmaker.

== Early life and career ==
King was born on 14 March 1947 in Forty Hill in the London Borough of Enfield. He earned a bachelor's degree in food science from the University of Nottingham, a M.S. from the University of Massachusetts Amherst, and a PhD in Agricultural Economics from the University of Reading in England, where he was on the faculty until resigning to devote more time to fiction. He was subsequently invited to teach at Ahmadu Bello University in Nigeria.

While writing his early novels King continued travelling and working in Africa and Asia, usually for UN agencies. In 1990, he was invited to teach creative writing, literature, and screenwriting at Eastern Washington University, and moved to the United States.

In 1991, after completing his third novel, King developed ME Disease. During irregular remissions, he was on the creative writing and English literature faculty at San Francisco State University, the University of New Mexico, and the Warren Wilson MFA Program.

Since 1997 King has lived and written in Leverett, Massachusetts, a small village outside of Amherst. He has received multiple fellowships from Yaddo, The MacDowell Colony, and the Virginia Center for the Creative Arts.

== Novels and critical reception ==
His first novel, Horizontal Hotel, was published by André Deutsch in 1983. The Irish Times called the book "a searing invocation of modern Africa," and The Guardian wrote, "All is trembling on the edge of breakdown, yet the writing stays cool; the effect is of a quiet delirium." WorldCat shows it is held in 54 libraries.

Written on a Stranger's Map followed in 1987 and drew on King's experiences working in Sierra Leone and Liberia. The Guardian described it as a novel of "luminous clarity." WorldCat shows it is held in 59 libraries.

His third novel, Sea Level, was published in 1992 and was slightly more successful: WorldCat shows it in 83 libraries According to The New York Times, "this beautifully worked novel is told from the vantage point of a man who has reached the end of everything: his married life; his affair with a shrewd erotic mistress; his career, even the ends of the earth".

A fourth book, A Girl From Zanzibar was published in 2002. It won the BABRA (now NCBR) Award for "The Best Novel of the Year." The New York Times called A Girl From Zanzibar a "brilliantly prescient novel", and O Magazine said "a steady beat of danger pursues the adventurous, money-hungry heroine of Roger King’s intriguing new novel…King is no slouch at weaving global politics into his narrative, from shifty banking to arms dealing, but at heart Marcella’s quest is a traditional but profound one. The pathos of this well-told, frequently surprising story is how hard it is for this beautiful, intelligent 'woman from everywhere, belonging nowhere' to fulfill such fundamental need". According to WorldCat, it is in 162 libraries.

King's newly completed book, an autobiographical novel, titled Love and Fatigue in America, was published in March 2012. According to WorldCat, it is in 168 libraries. Publishers Weekly gave it a starred review, and it has elicited favourable response from others with M.E. A more recent review is positive as well.

== Film work ==
King was executive producer of the feature documentary Still, The Children Are Here, made in collaboration with Mira Nair and Dinaz Stafford. The film is set in the remote village of Sadholpara in Northeastern India. He has also written a screenplay adaptation of A Girl From Zanzibar, which is in development. His screenplay of Written on a Stranger's Map won the BBC/Writer's Guild award for best first screenplay.

== International work ==
King has worked in twenty African and Asian countries, primarily for United Nations' agencies. Projects ranged from rice farming and policy in Liberia, resettling ex-guerillas in Zimbabwe, jute in Bangladesh, facilitating popular participation projects, adult literacy, women's savings and microcredit in Sierra Leone, Liberia, The Gambia and Zambia, large scale regional economic development in Pakistan, to evaluating the decollectivisation of agriculture in Inner Mongolia, China. While implementing these projects, King was based in London, England, and Rome, Italy.

Recent international work has included alternative Global Future Scenarios for the World Bank Strategy Department and Afghanistan reconciliation and reconstruction proposals for UN agencies. In 2010–2011 he was the recipient of a Copeland Fellowship in International Development at Amherst College.

== Selected bibliography ==
- 2012: Love and Fatigue in America. University of Wisconsin Press (254p) ISBN 978-0-299-28720-7
- 2002: A Girl From Zanzibar. Helen Marx Books/Books and Co., New York
- 1992: Sea Level. Poseidon (Simon and Schuster), New York
- 1989: "Swallowing the World," Parnassus, 15 (2), New York
- 1987: Written on a Stranger's Map. Grafton-Collins, London
- 1986: (As Leonard Frank) "The Development Game," Granta, 20, "In Trouble Again," Penguin, London
- 1983: Horizontal Hotel, André Deutsch, London

== See also ==
- List of people with chronic fatigue syndrome
