= 2026 East Sussex County Council election =

2026 English local government election

- 7 May 2026

All 50 seats to East Sussex County Council 26 seats needed for a majority
- Registered: 427,014
- Turnout: 203,674; 47.7%
	First party	Second party	Third party
Leader	None	Kathryn Field	Johnny Denis
Party	Reform	Liberal Democrats	Green
Last election	0 seats, 0.2%	11 seats, 20.9%	4 seats, 14.5%
Seats before	2	11	6
Seats won	22	13	11
Seat change	▲20	▲2	▲5
Popular vote	59,648	45,393	41,551
Percentage	30.0%	22.8%	20.9%
Swing	▲29.8pp	▲1.9pp	▲6.4pp
	Fourth party	Fifth party	Sixth party
Leader	Carl Maynard (defeated)	Stephen Shing (Note: Leader of the Independent Democrats group.)	Chris Collier (defeated)
Party	Conservative	Independent	Labour
Last election	27 seats, 42.0%	3 seats, 6.5%	5 seats, 15.2%
Seats before	22	4 (Note: Of the 4 Independent councillors before the election, 2 sat in the Independent Democrats group and 2 were non-aligned.)	5
Seats won	3	1	0
Seat change	▼19	▼3	▼5
Popular vote	31,840	7,324	12,268
Percentage	16.0%	3.6%	6.2%
Swing	▼26.0pp	▼2.9pp	▼9.0pp
- Winner of each seat at the 2026 East Sussex County Council election.
Leader before election
Keith Glazier
Conservative
No overall control (Note: Conservative minority.)
Leader after election
Andy Woolley
Reform
No overall control (Note: Reform minority.)

The 2026 East Sussex County Council election took place in 2026 to elect members to East Sussex County Council in East Sussex, England. All 50 seats were elected. This was on the same day as other English local elections.

Prior to the election, the council was under no overall control. The Conservatives were the largest party and ran the council as a minority administration. At this election, the council remained under no overall control. The Conservatives lost most of their seats, only retaining three. Reform UK emerged as the largest party, winning 22 seats, four seats short of an overall majority. At the subsequent annual council meeting on 21 May 2026, the new Reform group leader, Andy Woolley, was appointed leader of the council, running a Reform minority administration. His candidacy was also voted for by the Conservatives and the one independent councillor. He narrowly defeated by one vote a rival bid from the Liberal Democrats and Green Party to have the Liberal Democrat leader, Kathryn Field, appointed as leader of the council instead.

== Summary ==
=== Background ===
At the 2021 election, the Conservatives won an outright majority of seats. After two 2023 by-elections following the deaths of sitting Conservative councillors the party lost overall control of the council. The election is expected to be the last before the council is abolished and replaced with new unitary authorities. The election was originally postponed from 2025, then again delayed by another year until the government u-turned and reinstated the elections for 2026.

The Conservatives and Labour Party were expected to be tested heavily due to the growth of Reform UK (notably high polling, a by-election win and a defection from the Conservatives) and the Green Party (who control councils since 2023 in Hastings, Lewes and Wealden) since the last election in 2021. The Liberal Democrats were also strong, controlling councils such as Eastbourne and being the opposition on the county council.

Prior to the election, the leader of the council was Conservative councillor Keith Glazier, who had held the post since 2013. He did not stand for re-election.

== Council composition ==
After 2021 election		Before 2026 election	
Party	Seats	Party	Seats
Conservative	27	Conservative	22
Liberal Democrats	11	Liberal Democrats	11
Green	4	Green	6
Labour	5	Labour	5
Reform	0	Reform	2
Independent	3	Independent	4 (Note: 2 councillors sit as part of the Independent Democrats group.)

Changes 2021–2026:

- April 2023: Rupert Simmons (Conservative) dies – by-election held July 2023
- June 2023: Barry Taylor (Conservative) dies – by-election held August 2023
- July 2023: Anne Cross (Green) gains by-election from Conservatives
- August 2023: Brett Wright (Liberal Democrats) gains by-election from Conservatives
- June 2024: Abul Azad (Conservative) leaves party to sit as an independent
- May 2025: Samuel Adeniji (Conservative) leaves party to sit as an independent
- September 2025: Peter Pragnell (Conservative) dies – by-election held November 2025
- November 2025: Aidan Fisher (Reform) gains by-election from Conservatives
- January 2026: Samuel Adeniji (Independent) joins Reform
- February 2026: Brett Wright (Liberal Democrats) joins Greens

== Summary ==
=== Election result ===
2026 East Sussex County Council election
Party	Candidates	Seats	Gains	Losses	Net gain/loss	Seats %	Votes %	Votes	+/−
Reform	50	22	21	1	▲20	44.0	30.0	59,648	+29.8
Liberal Democrats	50	13	3	1	▲2	26.0	22.8	45,393	+1.9
Green	50	11	7	2	▲5	22.0	20.9	41,551	+6.4
Conservative	50	3	0	19	▼19	6.0	16.0	31,840	–26.0
Independent	14	1	0	3	▼3	2.0	3.6	7,324	–2.9
Labour	41	0	0	5	▼5	0.0	6.2	12,268	–9.0
RAOIC	1	0	0	0	Steady	0.0	0.4	864	N/A
UKIP	2	0	0	0	Steady	0.0	0.1	114	–0.3
TUSC	3	0	0	0	Steady	0.0	<0.0	75	N/A
Heritage	1	0	0	0	Steady	0.0	<0.0	39	±0.0

== Candidates by authority ==
=== Eastbourne ===
Borough summary

Eastbourne borough summary
Party	Seats	+/-	Votes	%	+/-
Liberal Democrats	7	▲1	13,672	41.3	–2.0
Reform	1	▲1	9,463	28.6	+28.4
Conservative	1	▼1	5,682	17.2	–21.8
Green	0	▼1	3,176	9.6	+3.2
Labour	0	Steady	922	2.8	–6.2
Independent	0	Steady	113	0.3	–0.3
Heritage	0	Steady	39	0.1	N/A
TUSC	0	Steady	31	0.1	N/A
UKIP	0	Steady	30	0.1	–1.3
Total	9	Steady	33,128	44.0	
Registered electors			75,417	–	

Incumbents

Ward	Incumbent councillor	Party	Re-standing
Devonshire	Stephen Holt	Liberal Democrats	Yes
Hampden Park	Colin Swansborough	Liberal Democrats	Yes
Langney	Alan Shuttleworth	Liberal Democrats	Yes
Meads	Brett Wright (Note: Originally elected as a Liberal Democrat at the 2023 Meads by-election; later defected to the Green Party.)	Green	Yes
Old Town	John Ungar	Liberal Democrats	No
Ratton	Colin Belsey	Conservative	Yes
St Anthony's	David Tutt	Liberal Democrats	No
Sovereign	Penny Di Cara	Conservative	Yes
Upperton	Pat Rodohan	Liberal Democrats	No

Division results

Devonshire
Party	Candidate	Votes	%	±%
Liberal Democrats	Stephen Holt*	1,520	44.0	−0.4
Reform	Chris Pettitt	905	26.2	N/A
Green	Mike Dickens	493	14.3	+5.3
Conservative	Daniel de Rozarieux	297	8.6	−18.1
Labour Co-op	Paul Richards	186	5.4	−10.8
Independent	Keith Gell	51	1.5	N/A
Majority				
Turnout		3,458	35.3	+7.6
Registered electors		9,799		
Liberal Democrats hold				

Hampden Park
Party	Candidate	Votes	%	±%
Liberal Democrats	Colin Swansborough*	1,275	44.6	+3.7
Reform	Bernard Tominey	959	33.5	N/A
Conservative	Moz Hussain	248	8.7	−22.0
Green	Zuza Zak	223	7.8	+0.6
Labour	Margaret Robinson	93	3.3	−11.1
Independent	Dave Poole	62	2.2	N/A
Majority		316	11.1	+0.9
Turnout		2,869	37.5	+7.3
Registered electors		7,654		
Liberal Democrats hold				

Langney
Party	Candidate	Votes	%	±%
Liberal Democrats	Alan Shuttleworth*	1,396	49.8	−14.2
Reform	Mike McCarthy	1,009	36.0	N/A
Conservative	Nick Ansell	196	7.0	−18.1
Green	Carla Sheppard	132	4.7	+1.9
Labour	Angela Goodchild	39	1.4	−4.4
UKIP	Ian Garbutt	30	1.1	−1.2
Majority		387	13.8	–25.1
Turnout		2,805	36.6	+6.7
Registered electors		7,666		
Liberal Democrats hold				

Meads
Party	Candidate	Votes	%	±%
Liberal Democrats	Jack Morrell	1,553	34.3	−5.7
Conservative	Robert Smart	1,110	24.5	−21.1
Reform	Peter Bucklitsch	1,054	23.3	+20.9
Green	Brett Wright*	682	15.1	+9.0
Labour	Dennis Scard	129	2.8	+3.1
Majority		443	9.8	N/A
Turnout		4,538	53.1	+7.4
Registered electors		8,539		
Liberal Democrats gain from Green		Swing	▲7.7	

Old Town
Party	Candidate	Votes	%	±%
Liberal Democrats	Peter Diplock	2,461	57.8	+8.6
Reform	James Norris	787	18.5	N/A
Conservative	Jessica Gisby	475	11.2	−18.3
Green	Pauline von Hellermann	403	9.5	+0.4
Labour	Dave Brinson	93	2.2	−10.0
Heritage	Martine Horvath	39	0.9	N/A
Majority		1,674	39.3	+19.6
Turnout		4265	51.7	+7.8
Registered electors		8,243		
Liberal Democrats hold				

Ratton
Party	Candidate	Votes	%	±%
Conservative	Colin Belsey*	1,174	32.4	−23.8
Liberal Democrats	Jim Murray	1,134	31.3	−1.2
Reform	David Alfred	993	27.4	N/A
Green	Ben Burbridge	239	6.6	+2.2
Labour	Gary Fry	86	2.4	−4.5
Majority		40	1.1	–22.6
Turnout		3,638	50.1	+7.7
Registered electors		7,266		
Conservative hold		Swing	▼11.3	

Sovereign
Party	Candidate	Votes	%	±%
Reform	Roy Peche	1,617	38.0	N/A
Conservative	Penny Di Cara*	1,212	28.5	−30.2
Liberal Democrats	Tom Nevill	1,041	24.5	−3.9
Green	Eniko Kalo	268	6.3	+2.1
Labour	John Sailing	113	2.7	−3.5
Majority		405	9.5	N/A
Turnout		4,260	45.9	+8.5
Registered electors		9,284		
Reform gain from Conservative				

St Anthony's
Party	Candidate	Votes	%	±%
Liberal Democrats	Hugh Parker	1,472	41.2	−10.3
Reform	Dave Watt	1,224	34.2	N/A
Conservative	Rosie Moon	477	13.3	−20.8
Green	John Shuttle	297	8.3	+3.0
Labour	John Lambert	76	2.1	−4.6
TUSC	Anthony Bracuti	31	0.9	N/A
Majority		248	7.0	–10.0
Turnout		3,588	42.7	+9.4
Registered electors		8,396		
Liberal Democrats hold				

Upperton
Party	Candidate	Votes	%	±%
Liberal Democrats	Kathy Ballard	1,820	48.2	+3.0
Reform	Colin Akers	915	24.2	N/A
Conservative	Carolann van Dinter	493	13.1	−21.2
Green	Yasin Salazar	439	11.6	+2.8
Labour	Lisa Gillette	107	2.8	−5.7
Majority		905	24.0	+13.2
Turnout		3,780	44.1	+5.8
Registered electors		8,570		
Liberal Democrats hold				

=== Hastings ===
Borough summary

Hastings borough summary
Party	Seats	+/-	Votes	%	+/-
Green	6	▲5	12,839	43.3	+25.6
Reform	2	▲1	7,679	25.9	N/A
Labour	0	▼3	4,790	16.2	–21.3
Conservative	0	▼3	3,045	10.3	–28.6
Liberal Democrats	0	Steady	1,286	4.3	–1.0
Total	8	Steady	29,296	44.3	
Registered electors			66,076	–	

Incumbents

Ward	Incumbent councillor	Party	Re-standing
Ashdown & Conquest	Aidan Fisher (Note: Elected at the 2025 Ashdown & Conquest by-election.)	Reform	Yes
Baird & Ore	Alan Hay	Conservative	No
Braybrooke & Castle	Godfrey Daniel	Labour	No
Central St Leonards & Gensing	Trevor Webb	Labour	No
Hollington & Wishing Tree	Phil Scott	Labour	No
Maze Hill & West St Leonards	Matthew Beaver	Conservative	Yes
Old Hastings & Tressell	Julia Hilton	Green	Yes
St Helens & Silverhill	Sorrell Marlow-Eastwood	Conservative	No

Division results

Ashdown & Conquest
Party	Candidate	Votes	%	±%
Reform	Aidan Fisher*	1,246	36.0	N/A
Green	Paula Warne	835	24.1	+15.4
Conservative	Roger Streeten	728	21.0	−38.8
Labour Co-op	Louise Chantal	447	12.9	−10.5
Liberal Democrats	Stewart Rayment	208	6.0	−2.7
Majority		411	11.9	−24.5
Turnout		3478	42.5	−0.8
Registered electors		8,175		
Reform hold		Swing	37.4	

Baird & Ore
Party	Candidate	Votes	%	±%
Green	Jo Walker	1,429	44.5	+33.7
Reform	Jack McCree	991	30.9	N/A
Labour Co-op	Kim Forward	364	11.3	−26.6
Conservative	Liam Atkins	305	9.5	−38.6
Liberal Democrats	Martin Griffiths	123	3.8	+0.6
Majority		438	13.6	+3.4
Turnout		3253	41.6	+2.8
Registered electors		7,819		
Green gain from Conservative		Swing	36.15	

Braybrooke & Castle
Party	Candidate	Votes	%	±%
Green	Becca Horn	2,577	60.0	+39.0
Reform	Peter Clarke	701	16.3	N/A
Labour	Josh Matthews	623	14.5	−35.1
Conservative	Paul Foster	259	6.0	−17.3
Liberal Democrats	Stephen Milton	134	3.1	−3.0
Majority		1876	43.7	+17.4
Turnout		4311	48.0	+4.7
Registered electors		8,972		
Green gain from Labour		Swing	37.06	

Central St Leonards & Gensing
Party	Candidate	Votes	%	±%
Green	Amanda Jobson	2,556	59.3	+33.7
Reform	Philip Morgan	736	17.1	N/A
Labour Co-op	Trevor Redmond	626	14.5	−30.3
Conservative	Caroline Kerswell	206	4.8	−18.5
Liberal Democrats	Anne Gallop	184	4.3	−2.0
Majority		1820	42.2	+23.1
Turnout		4328	43.8	+4.8
Registered electors		9,874		
Green gain from Labour		Swing	32.0	

Hollington & Wishing Tree
Party	Candidate	Votes	%	±%
Reform	Mark Estcourt	1,055	38.8	N/A
Labour	John Rankin	651	24.0	−26.4
Green	Justin Wynne	546	20.1	+12.1
Conservative	Stephen Butterton	314	11.6	−25.7
Liberal Democrats	Terry Keen	151	5.6	+1.3
Majority		404	14.8	+1.7
Turnout		2731	34.1	−0.3
Registered electors		8,007		
Reform gain from Labour		Swing	32.6	

Maze Hill & West St Leonards
Party	Candidate	Votes	%	±%
Green	Karen Simnett	1,218	34.8	+21.6
Reform	Derek Lawrence	1,031	29.4	N/A
Labour	Anna Sabin	657	18.8	−7.5
Conservative	Matthew Beaver*	490	14.0	−39.9
Liberal Democrats	Bruce Meredeen	105	3.0	−3.7
Majority		187	5.4	−22.1
Turnout		3523	46.1	+0.3
Registered electors		7,647		
Green gain from Conservative		Swing	30.75	

Old Hastings & Tressell
Party	Candidate	Votes	%	±%
Green	Julia Hilton*	2,017	54.1	+16.4
Reform	Yoong Kam	794	21.3	N/A
Labour	James Bacon	677	18.2	−15.7
Conservative	Andrew Patmore	165	4.4	−21.0
Liberal Democrats	Donna Harris	75	2.0	−1.0
Majority		1223	32.8	+29.0
Turnout		3734	49.4	+4.6
Registered electors		7,546		
Green hold		Swing	17.1	

St Helens & Silverhill
Party	Candidate	Votes	%	±%
Green	Shaun Dowling	1,152	29.5	+17.1
Reform	Sean Clarke	1,125	28.8	N/A
Labour Co-op	Margi O'Callaghan	745	19.1	−15.9
Conservative	Howard Martin	578	14.8	−32.1
Liberal Democrats	Bob Lloyd	306	7.8	+2.1
Majority		27	0.7	−11.2
Turnout		3938	49.0	−4.8
Registered electors		8,036		
Green gain from Conservative		Swing	49.2	

=== Lewes ===
District summary

Lewes district summary
Party	Seats	+/-	Votes	%	+/-
Liberal Democrats	4	▲1	13,310	32.8	+7.0
Green	3	▲1	10,460	25.8	+1.7
Reform	2	▲1	9,657	23.8	N/A
Conservative	0	▼1	4,724	11.6	–22.1
Labour	0	▼2	2,419	6.0	–9.0
Total	8	Steady	40,678	51.7	
Registered electors			78,680	–	

Incumbents

Ward	Incumbent councillor	Party	Re-standing
Chailey	Matthew Milligan	Conservative	No
Lewes	Wendy Maples	Green	Yes
Newhaven & Bishopstone	James MacCleary	Liberal Democrats	No
Ouse Valley West & Downs	Sarah Osborne	Liberal Democrats	Yes
Peacehaven	Chris Collier	Labour	No
Ringmer & Lewes Bridge	Johnny Denis	Green	Yes
Seaford North	Sam Adeniji (Note: Originally elected as a Conservative, but later defected to Reform.)	Reform	Yes
Seaford South	Carolyn Lambert	Liberal Democrats	Yes
Telscombe	Christine Robinson	Labour	No

Division results

Chailey
Party	Candidate	Votes	%	±%
Green	Charlotte Keenan	1,802	38.1	−0.8
Reform	Elizabeth Graham-Dixon	1,137	24.1	N/A
Conservative	Isabelle Linington	1,114	23.6	−16.5
Liberal Democrats	Marion Hughes	573	12.1	−3.3
Labour	Tim Embleton-Archard	101	2.1	−2.5
Majority				
Turnout		4,743	53.1	+6.2
Registered electors		8,927		
Green gain from Conservative		Swing		

Lewes
Party	Candidate	Votes	%	±%
Green	Wendy Maples*	2,600	49.6	+6.2
Liberal Democrats	Kevin West	2,072	39.5	+10.8
Reform	Lorraine Crawley	398	7.6	N/A
Conservative	William Webb	174	3.3	−8.3
Majority				
Turnout		5,255	63.8	+8.3
Registered electors		8,242		
Green hold		Swing		

Newhaven & Bishopstone
Party	Candidate	Votes	%	±%
Liberal Democrats	Lesley Boniface	2,059	49.4	+9.9
Reform	Archie Wilson	1,315	31.5	N/A
Green	Emily O'Brien	361	8.7	+1.7
Conservative	Catherine Boorman	339	8.1	−30.9
Labour	Joe Moughrabi	95	2.3	−4.6
Majority				
Turnout		4,183	46.4	+15.3
Registered electors		9,020		
Liberal Democrats hold		Swing		

Ouse Valley West & Downs
Party	Candidate	Votes	%	±%
Liberal Democrats	Sarah Osborne*	2,134	52.9	+1.8
Reform	Steve Kemsley	861	21.4	N/A
Green	Paul Keene	537	13.3	+4.6
Conservative	Wilfred Heasman-O'Neill	500	12.4	−21.5
Majority				
Turnout		4,046	51.3	+8.7
Registered electors		7,888		
Liberal Democrats hold		Swing		

Peacehaven
Party	Candidate	Votes	%	±%
Reform	Pedro Tracy	1,322	35.4	N/A
Labour	Paul Davies	905	24.2	−22.3
Conservative	Nigel Enever	725	19.4	−25.2
Green	Andy Chapman	541	14.5	+11.1
Liberal Democrats	Harry Garoghan	241	6.5	+3.8
Majority				
Turnout		3,746	41.4	+7.2
Registered electors		9,040		
Reform gain from Labour		Swing		

Ringmer & Lewes Bridge
Party	Candidate	Votes	%	±%
Green	Johnny Denis*	2,263	42.0	−8.5
Liberal Democrats	Janet Baah	1,869	34.7	+9.1
Reform	Mark O'Neill	767	14.2	N/A
Conservative	Richard Turner	385	7.2	−11.4
Labour	Ros Brewer	99	1.8	−3.5
Majority				
Turnout		5,386	58.3	+7.8
Registered electors		9,246		
Green hold		Swing		

Seaford North
Party	Candidate	Votes	%	±%
Liberal Democrats	Jane Reeves	1,629	33.4	+18.6
Reform	Sam Adeniji*	1,526	31.2	−19.2
Green	Ezra Cohen	1,284	26.3	+0.4
Conservative	Liz Boorman	445	9.1	−41.3
Majority				
Turnout		4,899	55.9	+14.7
Registered electors		8,771		
Liberal Democrats gain from Conservative		Swing		

Seaford South
Party	Candidate	Votes	%	±%
Liberal Democrats	Carolyn Lambert*	2,439	55.0	+9.2
Reform	Bill Payne	1,019	23.0	N/A
Green	Becky Francomb	474	10.7	+1.5
Conservative	Tam Large	391	8.8	−26.7
Labour	Christopher Purser	108	2.4	−7.1
Majority				
Turnout		4,441	50.9	+9.8
Registered electors		8,723		
Liberal Democrats hold		Swing		

Telscombe
Party	Candidate	Votes	%	±%
Reform	Stephen Chapman	1,312	33.1	N/A
Labour	Nikki Fabry	1,111	28.0	−17.0
Conservative	Sarah Webster	651	16.4	−26.3
Green	Phily Day	598	15.1	+9.1
Liberal Democrats	Shaun Boniface	294	7.4	+1.1
Majority				
Turnout		3,979	45.1	+10.2
Registered electors		8,823		
Reform gain from Labour		Swing		

=== Rother ===
District summary

Rother district Summary
Party	Seats	+/-	Votes	%	+/-
Reform	7	▲7	11,428	32.0	+31.7
Conservative	1	▼5	7,859	22.0	–26.9
Liberal Democrats	1	Steady	5,664	15.8	+4.7
Green	0	Steady	4,546	12.7	+6.4
Labour	0	Steady	2,779	7.8	–7.9
Independent	0	▼2	2,583	7.2	–10.1
RAOIC	0	Steady	864	2.4	N/A
TUSC	0	Steady	44	0.1	N/A
Total	9	Steady	35,847	47.8	
Registered electors			75,057	–	

Incumbents

Ward	Incumbent councillor	Party	Re-standing
Battle & Crowhurst	Kathryn Field	Liberal Democrats	Yes
Bexhill East	Charles Clark	Independent	Yes
Bexhill North	Abul Azad (Note: Originally elected as a Conservative, but later left the party to sit as an independent.)	Independent	Yes
Bexhill South	Ian Hollidge	Conservative	Yes
Bexhill West	Nuala Geary	Conservative	No
Brede Valley & Marsham	Carl Maynard	Conservative	Yes
Northern Rother	Paul Redstone	Conservative	Yes
Rother North West	Eleanor Kirby-Green	Conservative	Yes
Rye & Eastern Rother	Keith Glazier	Conservative	No

Division results

Battle & Crowhurst
Party	Candidate	Votes	%	±%
Liberal Democrats	Kathryn Field*	1,736	45.6	−7.7
Reform	Austin Henderson	1,098	28.8	N/A
Conservative	Pam Doodes	468	12.3	−25.1
Green	Nicky Bishop	383	10.1	N/A
Labour	Marcus Kent	124	3.3	−6.0
Majority		638	16.8	+1.0
Turnout		3,823	48.6	+7.1
Registered electors		7,874		
Liberal Democrats hold				

Bexhill East
Party	Candidate	Votes	%	±%
Reform	Martin Kenward	1,267	35.7	N/A
Independent	Charles Clark*	604	17.0	−12.3
Green	Tina Neale	502	14.1	−0.4
Conservative	Simon Elford	441	12.4	−16.2
Labour	Gareth Delany	379	10.7	−1.7
Liberal Democrats	Bill Goddard	208	5.9	N/A
Independent	Tim Gordon	128	3.6	N/A
TUSC	Jordan Beeney	23	0.6	N/A
Majority		663	18.7	N/A
Turnout		3,562	41.6	+10.5
Registered electors		8,565		
Reform gain from Independent				

Bexhill North
Party	Candidate	Votes	%	±%
Reform	Donald Walmsley	1,056	30.9	N/A
RAOIC	Abul Azad*	864	25.3	N/A
Conservative	Paul Peters	484	14.2	−43.5
Liberal Democrats	Jimmy Stanger	410	12.0	+2.4
Green	Chris Glenn	267	7.8	N/A
Labour	Mark Legg	185	5.4	−27.4
Independent	Sharon Blagrove	152	4.4	N/A
Majority		192	5.6	N/A
Turnout		3,422	41.0	+7.4
Registered electors		8,356		
Reform gain from Independent				

Bexhill South
Party	Candidate	Votes	%	±%
Reform	Victoria Carson	1,333	31.3	N/A
Conservative	Ian Hollidge*	978	23.0	−17.0
Green	Arren Rathbone-Ariel	825	19.4	N/A
Labour	Christine Bayliss	704	16.5	−6.2
Liberal Democrats	Mark Hobden	218	5.1	N/A
Independent	Michelle Fairbrass	199	4.7	N/A
Majority		355	8.3	N/A
Turnout		4,267	43.8	+8.1
Registered electors		9,751		
Reform gain from Conservative				

Bexhill West
Party	Candidate	Votes	%	±%
Reform	Pete Morley	1,647	33.0	N/A
Independent	Connor Winter	1,307	26.2	N/A
Conservative	Joe Carter	1,047	21.0	−21.8
Green	Timothy Fenner	388	7.8	N/A
Liberal Democrats	Rory Llewelyn	334	6.7	−2.9
Labour	Ruairi McCourt	273	5.5	−5.2
Majority		340	6.8	N/A
Turnout		5,002	52.6	+9.0
Registered electors		9,519		
Reform gain from Conservative				

Brede Valley & Marsham
Party	Candidate	Votes	%	±%
Reform	Daniel Lach	1,483	35.8	+33.5
Conservative	Carl Maynard*	1,100	26.6	−26.8
Liberal Democrats	Beverley Coupar	869	21.0	N/A
Green	Reece Honeywell	447	10.8	N/A
Labour	Imogen Pollard	242	5.8	−5.4
Majority		383	9.2	N/A
Turnout		4,147	50.6	+7.9
Registered electors		8,110		
Reform gain from Conservative		Swing	▲30.2	

Northern Rother
Party	Candidate	Votes	%	±%
Conservative	Paul Redstone*	1,216	32.3	−27.4
Reform	Jonathan Jennings	1,162	30.9	N/A
Liberal Democrats	Stephen Hardy	778	20.7	−7.9
Green	Andrew Wedmore	408	10.8	N/A
Labour	Jeannie Eason	197	5.2	−6.5
Majority		54	1.4	–29.7
Turnout		3,769	50.6	+9.3
Registered electors		7,455		
Conservative hold				

Rother North West
Party	Candidate	Votes	%	±%
Reform	Mark Ashdown	1,196	31.3	N/A
Conservative	Eleanor Kirby-Green*	1,169	30.6	−35.2
Liberal Democrats	Mary Varrall	800	21.0	N/A
Green	Jonathan Kent	526	13.8	−7.9
Labour	Tim MacPherson	125	3.3	−5.4
Majority		27	0.7	N/A
Turnout		3,824	50.8	+12.7
Registered electors		7,525		
Reform gain from Conservative				

Rye & Eastern Rother
Party	Candidate	Votes	%	±%
Reform	Dan Bradley	1,186	29.5	N/A
Conservative	Sally-Ann Hart	956	23.8	−31.5
Green	Dominic Manning	800	19.9	−4.6
Labour	Amanda Pollard	550	13.7	−6.5
Liberal Democrats	Andrew Mier	311	7.7	N/A
Independent	Jimmy Hyatt	193	4.8	N/A
TUSC	Pete McLaren	21	0.5	N/A
Majority		230	5.7	N/A
Turnout		4,031	51.0	+10.2
Registered electors		7,902		
Reform gain from Conservative				

=== Wealden ===
District summary

Wealden district summary
Party	Seats	+/-	Votes	%	+/-
Reform	10	▲10	21,421	33.3	N/A
Green	2	Steady	10,530	16.4	+0.6
Conservative	1	▼9	14,886	23.2	–23.8
Liberal Democrats	1	Steady	11,461	17.8	–0.1
Independent	1	▼1	4,538	7.1	–3.4
Labour	0	Steady	1,518	2.1	–5.9
UKIP	0	Steady	84	0.1	–0.3
Total	15	Steady	64,652	49.1	
Registered electors			131,784	–	

Incumbents

Ward	Incumbent councillor	Party	Re-standing
Arlington, East Hoathly & Hellingly	Nick Bennett	Conservative	Yes
Crowborough North & Jarvis Brook	Johanna Howell	Conservative	No
Crowborough South & St John's	Philip Lunn	Conservative	No
Forest Row & Groombridge	Georgia Taylor	Green	Yes
Hailsham Market	Steve Murphy	Liberal Democrats	Yes
Hailsham New Town	Gerard Fox	Conservative	No
Heathfield & Mayfield	Anne Cross (Note: Elected at the 2023 Heathfield & Mayfield by-election.)	Green	No
Maresfield & Buxted	Roy Galley	Conservative	Yes
Pevensey & Stone Cross	Tom Liddiard	Conservative	Yes
Polegate & Watermill	Daniel Shing	Independent	Yes
Uckfield North	Claire Dowling	Conservative	Yes
Uckfield South with Framfield	Chris Dowling	Conservative	Yes
Wealden East	Bob Bowdler	Conservative	Yes
Wealden North East	Bob Standley	Conservative	No
Willingdon & South Downs	Stephen Shing	Independent	Yes

Division results

Arlington, East Hoathly & Hellingly
Party	Candidate	Votes	%	±%
Reform	William Boone	1,784	37.8	N/A
Conservative	Nick Bennett*	1,176	24.9	−31.2
Green	Ricardo Canha	835	17.7	+8.2
Liberal Democrats	Laura Murphy	789	16.7	+6.7
Labour	Brendan Clagg	133	2.8	−17.9
Majority		608	12.9	N/A
Turnout		4,742	46.4	–8.1
Registered electors		10,220		
Reform gain from Conservative				

Crowborough North & Jarvis Brook
Party	Candidate	Votes	%	±%
Reform	Catherine Fielding	1,804	37.9	N/A
Liberal Democrats	Bev Johnstone	1,414	29.7	−2.9
Conservative	Jeannette Towey	1,120	23.5	−10.2
Green	Nigel Fox	427	9.0	−0.7
Majority		390	8.2	N/A
Turnout		4,776	51.6	+14.0
Registered electors		9,258		
Reform gain from Conservative				

Crowborough South & St John's
Party	Candidate	Votes	%	±%
Reform	Sarah Jury	1,742	36.3	N/A
Conservative	Andrew Wilson	1,233	25.7	−30.0
Liberal Democrats	Alison Arthur	1,166	24.3	+1.1
Green	Martyn Everitt	376	7.8	−3.9
Independent	Neil Waller	282	5.9	N/A
Majority		509	10.6	N/A
Turnout		4,800	55.1	+19.3
Registered electors		8,717		
Reform gain from Conservative				

Forest Row & Groombridge
Party	Candidate	Votes	%	±%
Green	Georgia Taylor*	1,863	42.4	−15.7
Conservative	Edward Butler	1,163	26.5	−15.4
Reform	Andrew Joad	1,091	24.8	N/A
Liberal Democrats	Julia Chowaniec	278	6.3	N/A
Majority		700	15.9	–0.3
Turnout		4,408	54.3	+6.2
Registered electors		8,121		
Green hold		Swing	▼0.2	

Hailsham Market
Party	Candidate	Votes	%	±%
Reform	Neil Cleaver	1,455	43.2	N/A
Liberal Democrats	Steve Murphy*	1,099	32.7	−27.4
Conservative	Jordan Beech	456	13.5	−22.2
Green	Ali Stevens	356	10.6	N/A
Majority		356	10.5	N/A
Turnout		3,386	38.2	+8.6
Registered electors		8,864		
Reform gain from Liberal Democrats				

Hailsham New Town
Party	Candidate	Votes	%	±%
Reform	Paul Soane	1,192	34.0	N/A
Liberal Democrats	Gavin Blake-Coggins	800	22.8	−7.4
Independent	Barry Carpenter	768	21.9	N/A
Conservative	Trevor Botting	500	14.3	−33.3
Green	Simon Wells	248	7.1	N/A
Majority		392	11.2	N/A
Turnout		3,524	40.2	+8.4
Registered electors		8,774		
Reform gain from Conservative				

Heathfield & Mayfield
Party	Candidate	Votes	%	±%
Reform	Andy Woolley	1,480	32.4	N/A
Conservative	Teresa Blaxland	1,288	28.2	−31.0
Green	Jessika Hulbert	1,222	26.7	+8.2
Liberal Democrats	Anne Blake-Coggins	403	8.8	−1.6
Labour	Steve Taylor	177	3.9	−7.7
Majority		192	4.2	N/A
Turnout		4,605	51.0	+14.6
Registered electors		9,034		
Reform gain from Green				

Maresfield & Buxted
Party	Candidate	Votes	%	±%
Green	Christina Coleman	1,754	33.4	+15.7
Conservative	Roy Galley*	1,752	33.3	−29.1
Reform	Gary Johnson	1,371	26.1	N/A
Liberal Democrats	Tim Murray	380	7.2	−4.4
Majority		2	0.1	N/A
Turnout		5,271	56.8	+15.5
Registered electors		9,274		
Green gain from Conservative		Swing	▲22.4	

Pevensey & Stone Cross
Party	Candidate	Votes	%	±%
Reform	Roger Lincoln	1,490	41.7	N/A
Liberal Democrats	Mark Fairweather	941	26.4	−2.9
Conservative	Tom Liddard*	658	18.4	−31.7
Green	Xander Gottlieb	278	7.8	N/A
Labour	Lee Comfort	118	3.3	N/A
UKIP	Mike Pursglove	84	2.4	−6.0
Majority		549	15.3	N/A
Turnout		3,585	45.5	+13.0
Registered electors		7,887		
Reform gain from Conservative				

Polegate & Watermill
Party	Candidate	Votes	%	±%
Reform	Mickey Caira	1,466	35.5	N/A
Independent	Daniel Shing*	1,420	34.4	−19.9
Liberal Democrats	Katrina Best	498	12.1	+7.1
Conservative	James Heward	398	9.6	−19.7
Green	Debbie Lillington	253	6.1	+1.5
Labour	Jake Lambert	95	2.3	−4.6
Majority		46	1.1	N/A
Turnout		4,138	43.1	+8.0
Registered electors		9,612		
Reform gain from Independent				

Uckfield North
Party	Candidate	Votes	%	±%
Liberal Democrats	Kelvin Williams	1,113	31.6	−6.5
Reform	John Rhodes	1,082	30.7	N/A
Conservative	Claire Dowling*	785	22.3	−26.5
Green	Michelle Coates	407	11.5	−1.6
Labour	Dylan Underhill	138	3.9	N/A
Majority		31	0.9	N/A
Turnout		3,531	48.6	+11.9
Registered electors		7,273		
Liberal Democrats gain from Conservative				

Uckfield South with Framfield
Party	Candidate	Votes	%	±%
Reform	Peter Griffiths	1,322	32.9	N/A
Conservative	Christopher Dowling*	1,017	25.3	−22.3
Liberal Democrats	Kathy Butler	836	20.8	+4.1
Green	Linda Churnside	487	12.1	N/A
Labour Co-op	Ben Cox	362	9.0	−26.6
Majority		305	7.6	N/A
Turnout		4,038	50.9	+10.0
Registered electors		7,931		
Reform gain from Conservative				

Wealden East
Party	Candidate	Votes	%	±%
Reform	Stephen Potts	1,925	37.5	N/A
Conservative	Bob Bowdler*	1,378	26.9	−22.7
Green	Velvet Mason	1,072	20.9	−22.3
Liberal Democrats	Tracey Lovewell	452	8.8	N/A
Labour	Barry Simons	171	3.3	−3.9
Independent	Laurence Keeley	129	2.5	N/A
Majority		547	10.6	N/A
Turnout		5,143	51.8	+8.9
Registered electors		9,931		
Reform gain from Conservative				

Wealden North East
Party	Candidate	Votes	%	±%
Conservative	Michael Lunn	1,457	34.9	−15.3
Reform	Michael Barrett	1,037	24.8	N/A
Green	Ben Sherlock	652	15.6	+1.4
Liberal Democrats	Barbara Taylor	451	10.8	−11.2
Independent	Serena Gadd	321	7.7	N/A
Labour	James Walker	259	6.2	−7.3
Majority		420	10.1	–18.1
Turnout		4,189	51.2	+11.2
Registered electors		8,186		
Conservative hold				

Willingdon & South Downs
Party	Candidate	Votes	%	±%
Independent	Stephen Shing*	1,618	35.9	−18.5
Reform	Ben Smith	1,180	26.2	N/A
Liberal Democrats	Dionne Daniel	841	18.7	+9.2
Conservative	Nicholas Taylor	505	11.2	−24.9
Green	David Goulson	300	6.7	N/A
Labour	Paul Hunt	65	1.4	N/A
Majority		438	9.7	–8.6
Turnout		4,516	51.9	+5.4
Registered electors		8,702		
Independent hold				
