= Sophia Mirza =

British victim of myalgic encephalomyelitis (ME)

- Born: 1973; Brighton, United Kingdom
- Died: 25 November 2005 (aged 31–32); Brighton
- Cause of death: Acute kidney failure directly attributed to chronic fatigue syndrome (CFS)
- Known for: First death in the UK with CFS listed as a cause by coroner

Sophia Mirza (1973 – 25 November 2005) was a woman in the United Kingdom who died from complications of myalgic encephalomyelitis/chronic fatigue syndrome (ME/CFS); the inquest recorded the cause of death as "renal failure arising from the effects of Chronic Fatigue Syndrome".

== Medical history ==
Mirza was born in the United Kingdom in 1973, one of four children to Irish and Asian parents. As a teenager she had a lumbar puncture for suspected viral meningitis. She visited Africa at the age of 19, traveling and working throughout the continent and was infected with malaria twice while there. At the age of 26, Mirza fell ill with what appeared to be the flu and shortly afterward became bedridden.

=== Hospitalization ===
In July 2003 Mirza was forcibly removed from her home and sectioned for two weeks by her doctors, who had come to believe her condition was psychosomatic, an action which her mother and sister said severely worsened her condition. Her mother and sister stated that Mirza's physical symptoms were treated as a mental condition rather than a physical illness, and her mother was accused of enabling her.

=== Death ===
For two years following her sectioning, Mirza's health deteriorated. By September 2005 she took a significant turn for the worse, developing intolerance to most of the food she consumed, ear infection and severe pain, and was only able to consume a small amount of water. At the time of her death she was only able to tolerate 4 imp fl oz (110 mL) of water a day, as her glands would swell up and it felt like the circulation in her legs was being cut off. However, due to her previous experiences, she did not want a doctor to be called. Mirza died on 25 November 2005. Initial autopsy results were inconclusive for her cause of death.

== Inquest and legacy ==
An official inquest was held to determine Mirza's cause of death, including a second autopsy, released on 13 June 2006. The coroner concluded Mirza died as a result of CFS: "acute aneuric [sic] renal failure due to dehydration" caused by "CFS".

Other possible causes that were eliminated after consideration were sleep apnea, drug use, and others that could have been consistent with the autopsy results. A neuropathologist testified at the inquest that four out of five of Mirza's dorsal root ganglia – structures in the spinal cord involved in perceptions of touch, temperature, body position and pain – showed abnormalities and evidence of inflammation (ganglionitis). A neurologist who consulted on the inquest stated the changes in the spinal cord may have been the cause of the symptoms Mirza experienced as part of her ME/CFS.

Advocacy groups such as the ME Association saw the inquest's verdict as proof that Mirza's condition was neurological. Though initially reported by New Scientist as the first death worldwide ascribed to CFS, the magazine later acknowledged that other deaths had been directly attributed to CFS in the United States and Australia. Fatalities have been attributed to CFS or ME since at least 1956.

After her death, her mother established Severe ME Awareness Day on 8 August (her birthday) to honor Mirza and raise awareness.

== See also ==
- List of people with ME/CFS
- Lynn Gilderdale
