= Pelham House =

County building in Lewes, East Sussex, England

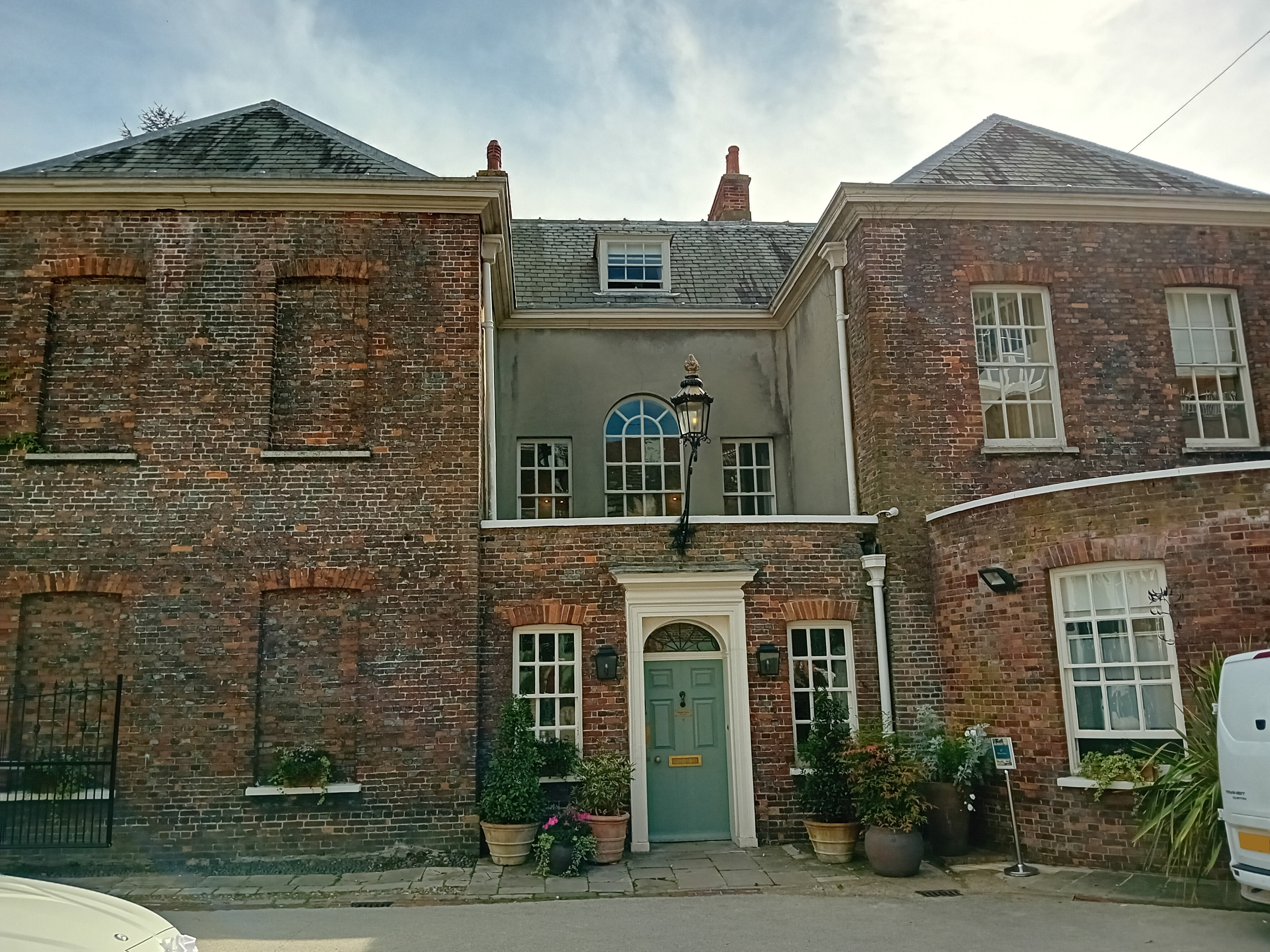
- Main entrance, north elevation

- Location within East Sussex
- 50.8723°N 0.0096°E
- Location: Lewes, East Sussex

History
- Built: c.1579

Site notes
- Architectural style: Classical style

Listed Building – Grade II
- Designated: 25 February 1952
- Reference no.: 1043747

Pelham House is a large red-bricked building at St Andrews Lane in Lewes, East Sussex. The building which was the headquarters of East Sussex County Council from 1938 to 1968, is a Grade II listed building.

== History ==
The house was built for George Goring, one of the two members of parliament for Lewes, in about 1579. It remained in the Goring family until 1649, when it was sold to Peter Courthope, who served as Sheriff of Sussex in 1650. Courthope in turn sold it to Sir Thomas Pelham, one of the members of parliament for Sussex, in 1653. It remained in the Pelham family and, after it passed to Thomas Pelham of Catsfield in 1725, he arranged for it to be re-fronted in the classical style in the mid-18th century. The design involved a symmetrical main frontage with seven bays facing north; the centre section of three bays featured a doorway with a fanlight on the ground floor with a large cast iron lamp above; there was a deep recess on the first floor with a large rounded headed window in the centre flanked by two square windows.

Following the death of Thomas Pelham, 1st Earl of Chichester, the last member of the Pelham family to own the building, it was acquired by Thomas Campion, a wine importer, in 1805. After sale by the Campion family in the mid 19th century, it passed to John Fullager (a lawyer), then to William Robins (a brewer), to John Ingham Blencowe (an estate agent), to Margaret Sikes Duval (a spinster) and, finally, to William Taylor Banks (a stockbroker).

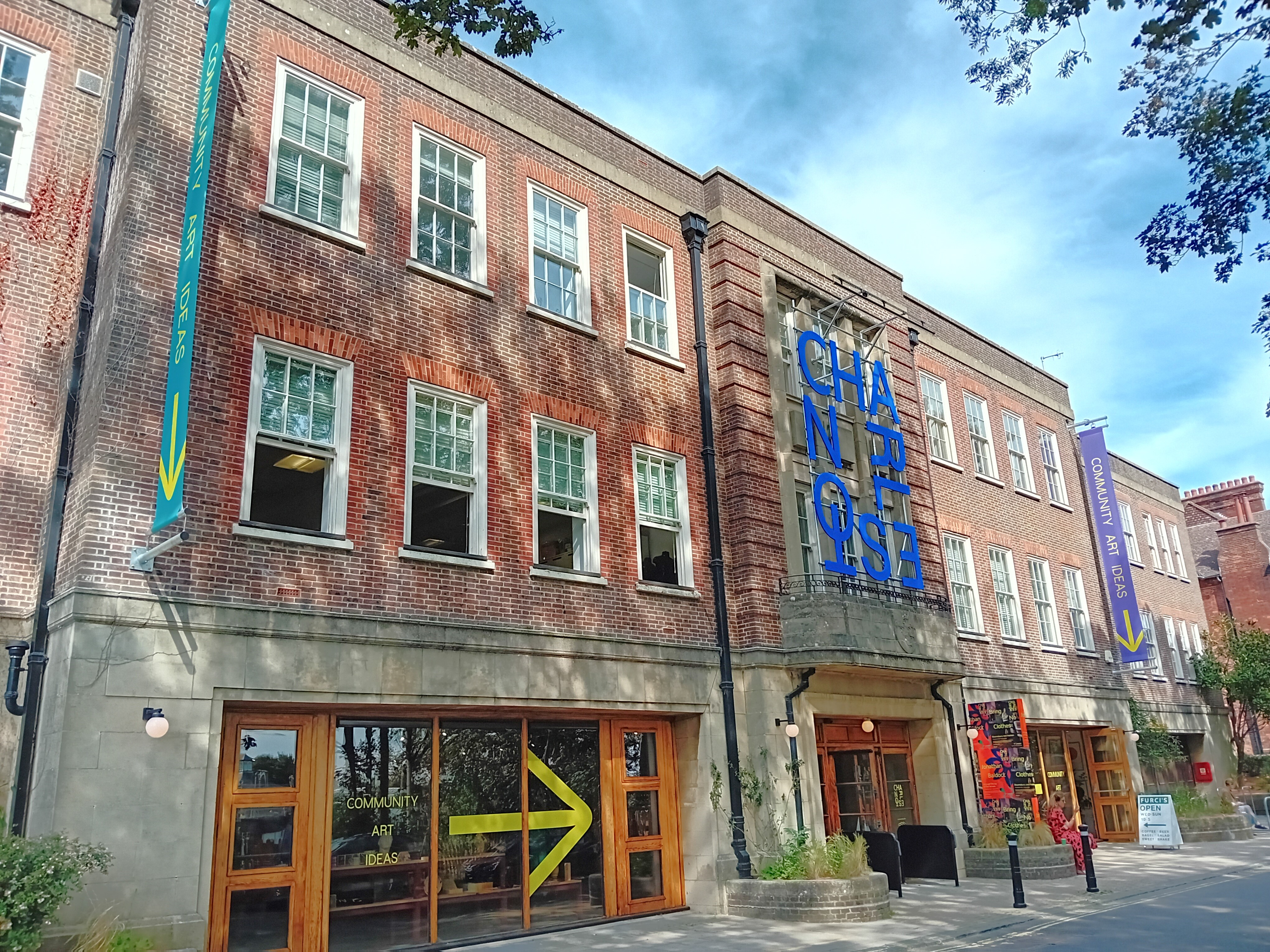
Southover House: County Council offices built in former gardens of Pelham House, completed 1938.

The building was bought in 1928 by East Sussex County Council and converted to offices. In 1938 the building also became the meeting place of the county council, replacing the old County Hall, following the completion of an extension incorporating a council chamber and committee rooms. In addition, the county council built itself a large new office block called Southover House on the former gardens to the south of the house, which was also completed in 1938.

During the Second World War, the Home Guard established a miniature rifle range in the grounds which were substantial and sloped downwards, in three tiers, to the south. The county council established offices at St Anne's Crescent in Lewes in 1968 but continued using offices in Pelham house for the chief executive's department and the legal and community services department and also continued to use the council chamber for county council meetings until October 2003. Southover House was sold to Lewes District Council in 1998.

However, in the early 21st century, the house was then deemed surplus to requirements and was marketed for sale. It was acquired by a consortium of five families in 2004 and subsequently converted into a hotel and conference centre based on the plans of LCE Architects. After the consortium decided to dispose of its interest, the house was then bought by a venture known as Pelham House Lewes Ltd in 2018 and subsequently converted into a wedding venue based on plans by Sedley Place Design.
