= St Mary's Church, Glynde =

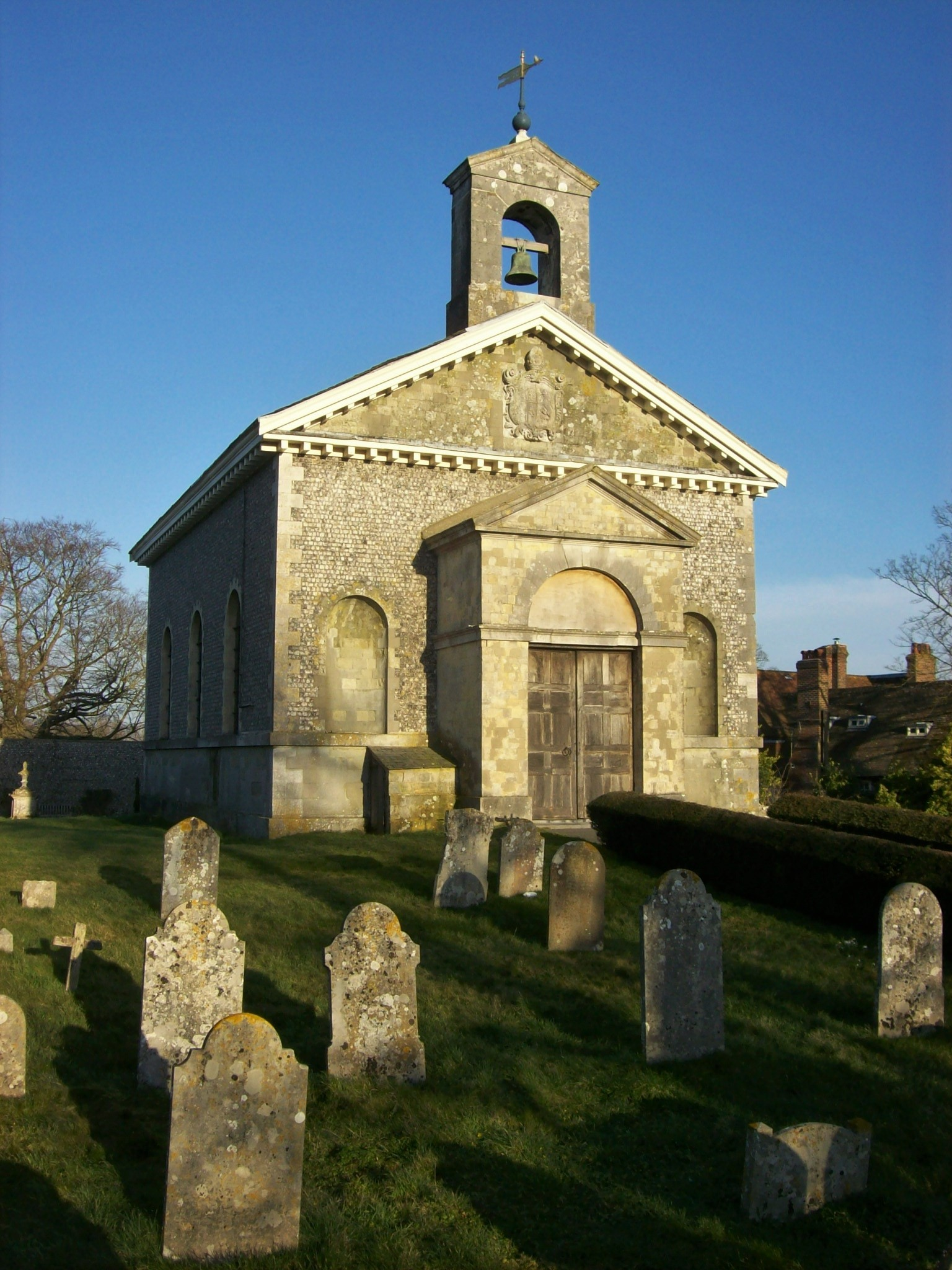
- St Mary's Church, Glynde
- 50.8653°N 0.0683°E
- OS grid reference: TQ 456 093
- Location: Glynde
- Country: England
- Denomination: Church of England

History
- Dedication: Saint Mary the Virgin

Architecture
- Heritage designation: Grade II*
- Designated: 20 August 1965
- Architect: Sir Thomas Robinson, 1st Baronet
- Style: Palladian
- Completed: 1765

Administration
- Diocese: Diocese of Chichester

The Church of St Mary the Virgin is a Grade II* listed Anglican church in the village of Glynde in East Sussex. It was built in the 1760s by Richard Trevor, bishop of Durham, whose family seat was the adjacent Glynde Place.

== History ==
There was a medieval church, which stood at an angle to the present building; little is known about it. A new church was built on the site by Richard Trevor, who was Bishop of Durham from 1752 to 1771, and a member of the Trevor family who owned Glynde Place. It was designed by Sir Thomas Robinson, who had worked for Richard Trevor on his Bishop's Palace in County Durham. The work was done by John Morris, a builder from the nearby town of Lewes.

The demolition of the old church, which was in a poor condition, began on 1 August 1763. The foundation and vault of the new church were built that year; the superstructure was built in 1764; the building was completed in 1765. The first service in the new church took place on Sunday 30 June of that year. A newspaper at the time reported that it is "a neat and elegant building, and is very decently ornamented."

== Description ==
Sir Thomas Robinson had visited Italy and was enthusiastic about Renaissance architecture: the church is built in Palladian style.

The walls are faced with knapped flint and have an ashlar base. In the tympanum of the pediment above the west wall, the coat of arms of Richard Trevor is displayed in Portland stone. Above the pediment is a bell, housed in an open ashlar belfry.

The space inside is a perfect rectangle, except that the communion table is in a recess in the thickness of the east wall. There is a coved ceiling. Most of the interior details, including the box pews, are contemporary with the building. In 1841 a gallery, to accommodate more people, was built at the west end.
