= Vlad Vexler =

British philosopher and political commentator (born 1981)

- Born: 1981 (age 44–45); Moscow, Russian SFSR, Soviet Union
- Citizenship: British
- Education: University of Oxford (postgraduate study)
- Occupations: Philosopher, political commentator, YouTuber

YouTube information
- Channels: Vlad Vexler; Vlad Vexler Chat; Vlad Vexler Philosophy
- Years active: 2019–present
- Subscribers: 349,309 (total)
- Views: 54.7 million (total)
- Last updated: 9 October 2026
- Website: www.vladvexler.com

Vlad Vexler (born 1981) is a Russian-born British philosopher, political commentator and YouTuber based in London. He is known for video commentary on Russian politics, the Russian invasion of Ukraine, Russian propaganda and the condition of Western democracies.

== Early life and education ==
Vexler was born in Moscow in 1981, in what was then the Soviet Union. He has described queuing as a child at the first McDonald's restaurant in Moscow, which opened on Pushkin Square in 1990, and saving money for weeks to buy his first meal there. His family left for Israel and, a few years later, settled in the United Kingdom, where he became a British citizen.

He undertook postgraduate study at Christ Church, Oxford.

== Career ==
Vexler describes his academic work as concerned with the concept of freedom, and has said he is writing a book on the philosopher Isaiah Berlin. He has also worked in musicology.

=== YouTube and commentary ===
Vexler publishes commentary on YouTube on Russian politics, post-truth politics and democratic decline. In January 2023 the Kyiv Post included his channel, then at about 109,000 subscribers, in a list of ten English-language YouTube channels covering the war in Ukraine, describing it as philosophical in approach and noting videos on why Russians do not protest and on Vladimir Putin's motives.

In March 2022 the Associated Press interviewed him for a report on McDonald's suspending its Russian operations after the invasion of Ukraine. Vexler called the 1990 Moscow opening "a sign of optimism that in the end didn't materialise".

In 2023 he was interviewed for Skyggekrigen (The Shadow War), a documentary series by the Nordic public broadcasters, including Denmark's DR, on Russian intelligence operations in Nordic waters. In May 2023 he appeared on BBC Radio Wales's Sunday Supplement to discuss the Kremlin drone attack and the war in Ukraine.

== Personal life ==
Vexler lives in London. He has said that he developed myalgic encephalomyelitis (ME) in 2003 while a postgraduate student at Oxford, that he was unable to walk, talk or read for two years, and that he remains largely housebound.
