= Lynn Gilderdale =

British suicide victim

Lynette Gilderdale
- Born: 20 September 1977
- Died: 4 December 2008 (aged 31)
- Cause of death: Assisted suicide by morphine overdose
- Known for: Suicide, subsequent trial of her mother who helped her

Lynette "Lynn" Gilderdale (20 September 1977 – 4 December 2008), also known on the internet as Jessie Oliver, was a British woman with a severely diminished quality of life from chronic fatigue syndrome (also known as myalgic encephalomyelitis) who died by suicide after taking a morphine overdose after she decided she no longer wanted to endure the pain from the illness. She was assisted by her mother, Bridget Kathleen "Kay" Gilderdale, who was subsequently charged with attempted murder and was eventually given a one-year conditional discharge after admitting to assisting with her daughter's suicide.

== Early life ==
She spent her early life in Burwash, East Sussex, in south-eastern England. She later moved with her family to nearby Stonegate where she attended school. She participated in sailing and other sports, was captain of her school netball team, and won prizes for ballet.

Her father, Richard Gilderdale, was a police officer in East Sussex and has been latterly employed in a civilian role for the force. Her mother was an auxiliary nurse, then an accountant, but from 1992 was Lynn's full-time carer.

== Onset of illness ==
Gilderdale fell ill in November 1991 after receiving the BCG vaccination. She attended school for only one or two days following this. She had a series of infections including flu, bronchitis, tonsillitis and glandular fever. The illness progressed rapidly, and from accounts by her mother, within six months "she was totally bedridden, unable to lift her head off the pillow, or care for herself in any way at all. She was tube-fed, her legs were paralysed and she couldn’t sit up. She was unable to speak, read or write and her memory had gone". At her worst, she was paralysed in all but her little finger, and suffered muscle spasms and severe light and sound sensitivity. However, by mid-1993, Lynn was able to move her arms again, as she was shown doing in a documentary on ME.

Lynn Gilderdale reported in 2008 that she had been sexually abused in a hospital at the age of 14; the police investigated, but made no arrests.

== Media appearances ==
Lynn Gilderdale appeared in the media on various occasions during her illness, and features without being named in various printed literature on CFS, such as the book The New Plague by Jane Colby (First and Best in Education, 1996). She appeared by name on three occasions:

- In 1993, she was filmed for the Channel 4 documentary Frontline, presented by Dr Anne Macintyre. She was shown lying in her bed with a nasogastric tube visible, using very basic gestures to communicate. Macintyre described her as "imprisoned by paralysis, mental confusion and pain" but did not discuss her specific symptoms, other than memory loss and lack of ability to swallow, in detail.
- In 2001, the BBC published an interview with Kay Gilderdale with photos of Lynn. Lynn's complications, such as hypothalamic dysfunction and a blood clot on the lung, were mentioned in more detail than in 1993.
- Kay was interviewed again in 2004 by "The Courier", which may have been the Kent and Sussex Courier. An extract is available on the 25% ME Group website and it does not mention the name Gilderdale but does mention Lynn and Kay and the quote - "Lynn finished by saying, that she will keep fighting to get better and that she did not live through the last 12 years not to get well and live a proper life" - is consistent with sentiments expressed in the 2001 BBC article.

Kay Gilderdale wrote a book, One Last Goodbye, which was published in the UK in April 2011. She also appeared in an independently produced documentary, Voices from the Shadows, about severe ME and the mistreatment of British patients, which premiered at the Mill Valley Film Festival in 2011 and won the Audience Favorite International Documentary Award there, and was recently released on mail-order DVD in Europe.

== Later period of illness ==
Gilderdale remained bedridden, unable to speak or swallow, in constant pain and suffering other debilitating symptoms for the whole of the period from mid-1992 to her death in December 2008. She required, by her mother's reckoning, between 50 and 60 hospital admissions. On one such occasion in late 2005, her lung was punctured during an operation at Conquest Hospital, Hastings, to replace a Hickman line, resulting in her ending up on life support. Her mother reported that she also suffered broken bones due to osteoporosis. At the time, her parents "said their goodbyes" as they feared she would not survive. She did survive, but Lynn found the experience traumatic and she subsequently expressed the wish not to be resuscitated in case of future similar circumstances.

However, her paralysis partly receded, the family were able to take care of her medical needs at home and reduce her hospital admissions to two or three per year, and her memory improved, enabling her to re-learn to read and to type. She used a pocket computer to communicate with friends over the Internet.

== Death ==
According to Kay Gilderdale:

"Although every system in Lynn’s body was badly affected, for a long time she truly believed she would recover, but gradually, as a result of chronic illness, more and more conditions were added to the already lengthy list [hypothalamic dysfunction, liver dysfunction, adrenal failure, angina, renal tubular acidosis type 1, osteoporosis, to name but a few] and she started to say to me in her sign language, 'Mum, you can’t fix me any more – I’m too broken, I’ve had enough'."

Lynn attempted suicide in May 2007 with an overdose of morphine and an injection of air. After this failure, she later wrote, she never wavered in her desire to die. She posted an explanation towards the end of her life, explaining that she was "so very, very tired" and that her spirit was broken (see below).

Lynn died at 07:10 on 4 December 2008. Kay's prosecution for attempted murder hinged on her actions during those hours, as she gave the family doctor the impression that she had injected Lynn with air, to cause a fatal embolism and with the antidepressant Sertraline. However, Lynn's body revealed no trace of the latter and Kay later said she could not remember injecting Lynn with air.

== Prosecution of Kay Gilderdale ==
Kay was charged with attempted murder on 21 April 2009.

The trial itself began on 12 January 2010. The prosecution opened their case on 18 January, making the accusation of deliberate injections of air. Prosecution Sally Howes QC told the jury:

"It is the prosecution’s case that when Mrs Gilderdale realised that the two large doses of morphine that she provided to Lynn, that Lynn self-administered to try to end her life…instead of then realising that her daughter’s suicide had gone horribly wrong, she then set about, over the next 30 hours, in performing actions which were designed with no other intention other than terminating her daughter’s life."

The further morphine, the further cocktail of drugs, the injecting of air – all designed to terminate her daughter's life. It wasn't done to make her better, it was done to make sure she died.

On 19 January, Lynn Gilderdale's father, Richard, who had been divorced from Kay but was still involved in Lynn's care, testified in Kay's defence. He testified that Lynn had developed a fear of hospitals after a series of incidents including the Oct 2005 Hickman line incident and had been sexually abused by a senior health professional in London. With regard to her quality of life, he replied, "It was less than poor. She had no quality of life. She couldn’t eat, she couldn’t drink." Richard Gilderdale, and Julie Cheeseman another of Lynn Gilderdale's carers, related that they had both tried to dissuade her from taking her own life. On the third day, the prosecution told the jury that Kay had searched the Internet for various suicide-related phrases in between Lynn's overdose and her death. Closing speeches were given by defence and prosecution on 23 January and Kay was acquitted of the attempted murder charge on 25 Jan.

Following Kay Gilderdale's acquittal, the judge made a statement praising the jury. Mr Justice Bean remarked: "I do not normally comment on the verdicts of juries but in this case their decision, if I may say so, shows that common sense, decency and humanity which makes jury trials so important in a case of this kind."

== See also ==
- Sophia Mirza
