= East Sussex County Council =

Local authority in East Sussex, England

- Coat of arms

- Council logo

Type
- Type: Non-metropolitan county

Leadership
- Chair: Martin Kenward, Reform UK since 21 May 2026
- Leader: Andy Woolley, Reform UK since 21 May 2026
- Chief executive: Becky Shaw since 2010

Structure
- Seats: 50 councillors
- Graph of the party split among 50 seats.
- Political groups: Administration (20) Reform (20) Other parties (30) Liberal Democrats (14) Green (10) Conservative (4) Independent (2)
- Length of term: 4 years

Elections
- Voting system: First past the post
- Last election: 7 May 2026

Meeting place
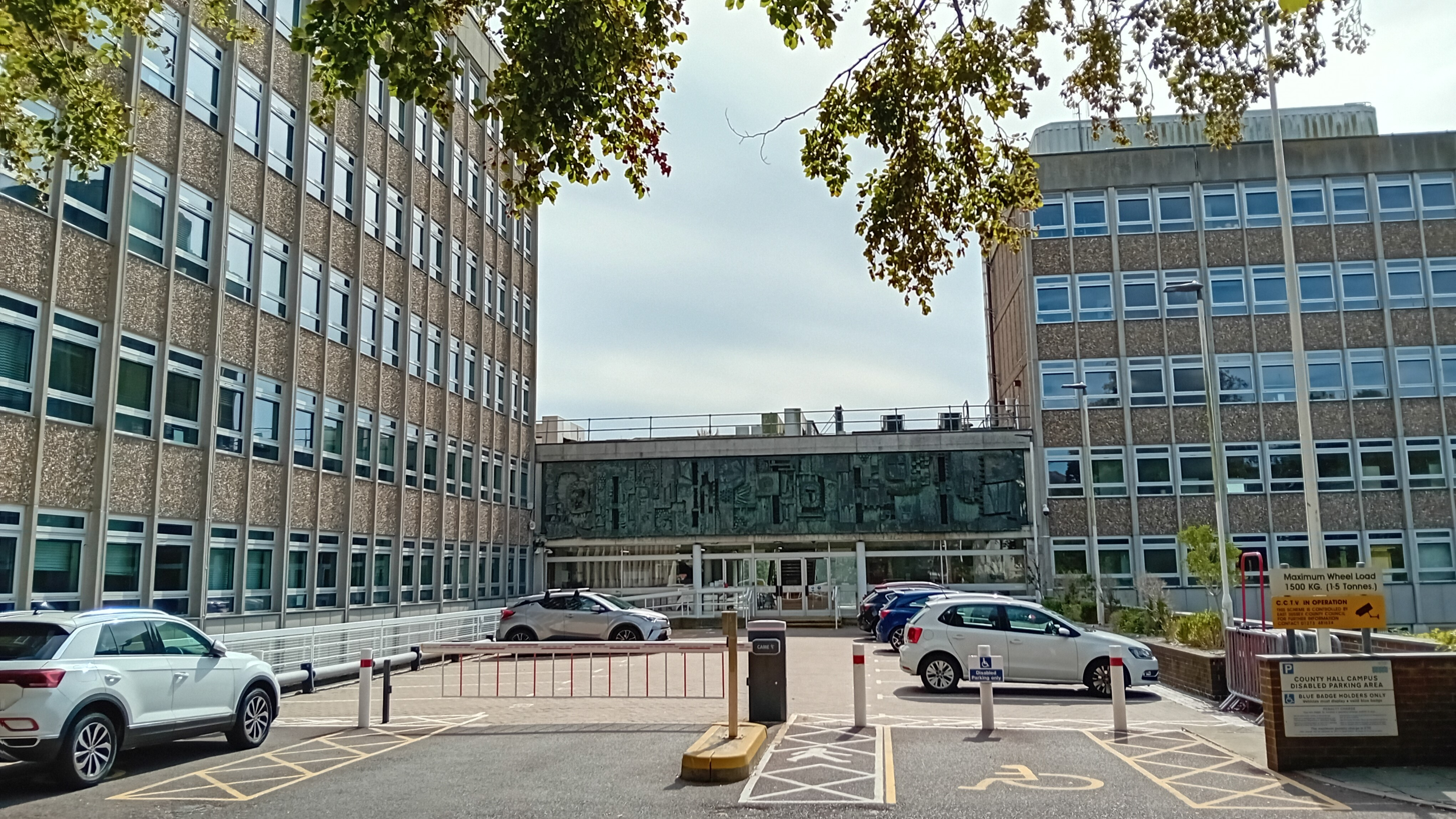
- County Hall, St Anne's Crescent, Lewes, BN7 1UE

Website
- www.eastsussex.gov.uk

East Sussex County Council is the upper tier local authority for the non-metropolitan county of East Sussex in England. The non-metropolitan county is smaller than the ceremonial county; the latter additionally includes Brighton and Hove.

East Sussex is divided into five local government districts. Three are larger, rural, districts (from west to east: Lewes; Wealden; and Rother). The other two, Eastbourne and Hastings, are mainly urban areas. The rural districts are subdivided into civil parishes.

The council has been under no overall control since 2023. Following the 2026 election a Reform UK minority administration formed to run the council. It has its headquarters at County Hall in Lewes; there are a number of other administrative buildings located throughout the county.

In 2026 the council became a member of the Sussex and Brighton Strategic Authority.

== History ==
Sussex was historically divided into six sub-divisions known as rapes. From the 12th century the practice arose of holding the quarter sessions separately for the three eastern rapes and the three western rapes, with the courts for eastern rapes being held at Lewes. This position was formalised by the County of Sussex Act 1865, with the eastern and western divisions of Sussex treated as separate counties for the purposes of taxation, law enforcement, asylums and highways, whilst still deemed to be one county for the purposes of lieutenancy, militia and the coroner.

Elected county councils were established in 1889 under the Local Government Act 1888 to take over the administrative business of the quarter sessions. The eastern and western divisions of Sussex therefore became the administrative counties of East Sussex and West Sussex with separate county councils. The two administrative counties were still treated as one county for certain ceremonial purposes, notably sharing the Lord Lieutenant of Sussex and Sheriff of Sussex. The large towns of Brighton and Hastings were deemed capable of providing their own county-level services and so they were made county boroughs, independent from East Sussex County Council. Eastbourne was later also made a county borough in 1911.

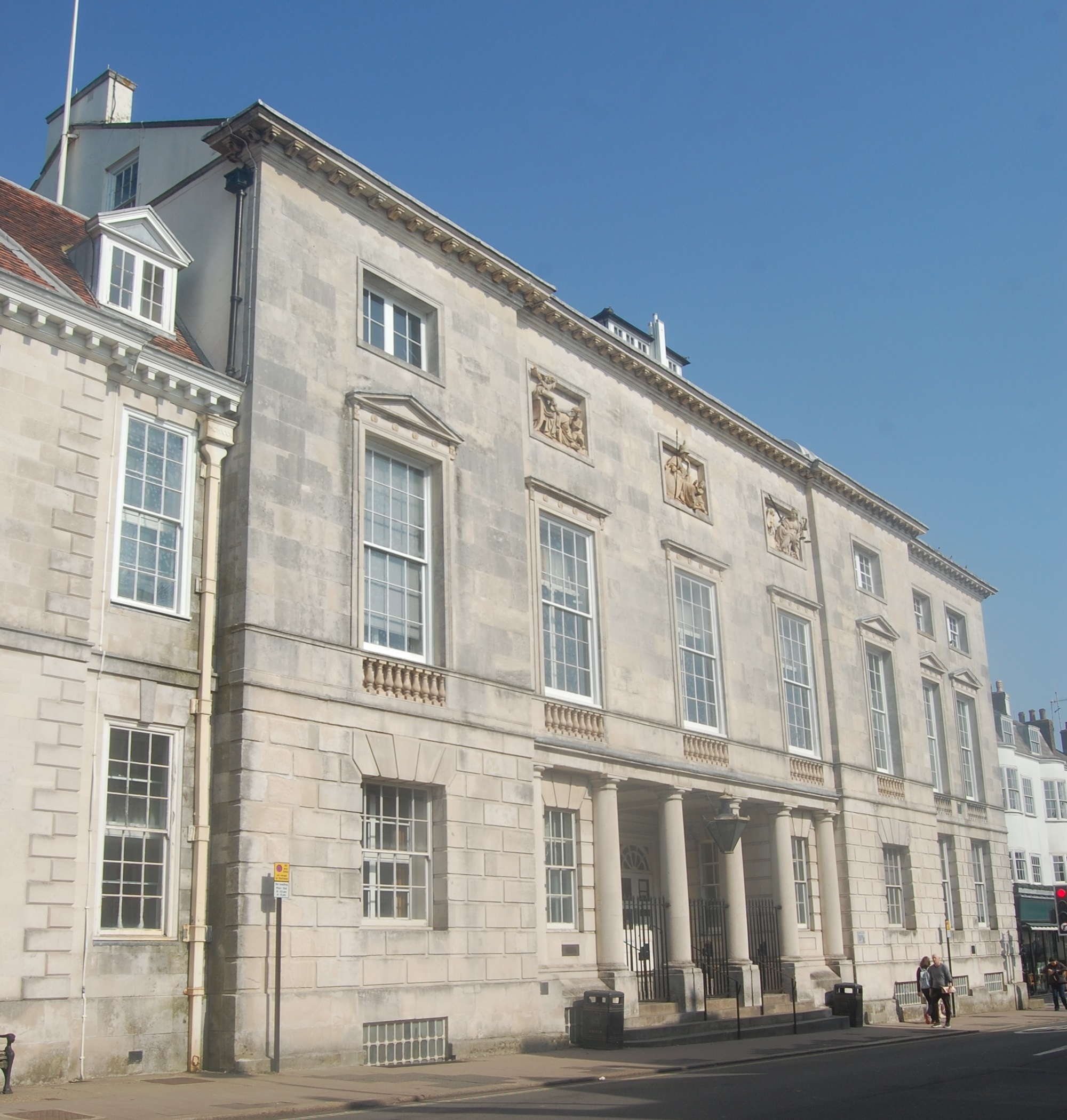
Old County Hall, Lewes: Council's headquarters until 1938.

The first elections were held in January 1889 and East Sussex County Council formally came into its powers on 1 April 1889, holding its first official meeting on the same day at County Hall in Lewes. John Dodson, Lord Monk Bretton, a Liberal peer and former Member of Parliament, was appointed the first chairman of the council.

Local government was reformed in 1974 under the Local Government Act 1972, which made East Sussex a non-metropolitan county. As part of the 1974 reforms it ceded the Mid Sussex area (including Burgess Hill and Haywards Heath) to West Sussex, but gained the three former county boroughs of Brighton, Eastbourne and Hastings. East Sussex and West Sussex also became separate ceremonial counties, with East Sussex gaining its own Lord Lieutenant and High Sheriff. The lower tier of local government was rearranged at the same time, with the county being divided into seven non-metropolitan districts.

In 1997 the two districts of Hove and Brighton were merged to become a unitary authority called Brighton and Hove, independent from the county council, leaving only five districts in the area administered by the county council. Brighton and Hove (which subsequently gained city status in 2001) remains part of the ceremonial county of East Sussex.

In 2026, the council became a member of the Sussex and Brighton Strategic Authority. Local government reorganisation is also being considered for the area. In July 2026, the government announced reforms across East Sussex which included creating an East Sussex unitary authority covering most of the county council's current area, with the exception of a small area ceded to Brighton and Hove. In September 2026 these proposals were paused for further review.

== Governance ==
East Sussex County Council provides county-level services. District-level services are provided by the county's five district councils: Eastbourne Borough Council, Hastings Borough Council, Lewes District Council, Rother District Council and Wealden District Council. Most of the county is also divided into civil parishes, which form an additional tier of local government. The exceptions are the two boroughs of Eastbourne and Hastings, which are unparished.

=== Political control ===
The council has been under no overall control since a by-election in August 2023, prior to which it had a Conservative majority. Following the 2026 election, Reform were the largest party on the council and formed a minority administration to run the council.

Political control of the council since the 1974 reforms has been as follows:

Party in control	Years
Conservative	1974–1985
No overall control	1985–1989
Conservative	1989–1993
No overall control	1993–2001
Conservative	2001–2013
No overall control	2013–2017
Conservative	2017–2023
No overall control	2023–present

=== Leadership ===
The leaders of the council since 1999 have been:

Councillor	Party	From	To
David Rogers	Liberal Democrats	May 1999	Jun 2001
Peter Jones	Conservative	19 Jun 2001	May 2013
Keith Glazier	Conservative	21 May 2013	May 2026
Andy Woolley	Reform	21 May 2026	

=== Composition ===
Following the 2026 election, the composition of the council was:

Party	Seats
Reform	22
Liberal Democrats	14
Green	10
Conservative	3
Independent	1
Total	50

== Premises ==
The council is based at East Sussex County Hall on St Anne's Crescent in Lewes, which was purpose-built for the council in 1968. There are additional offices in Eastbourne and Hastings.

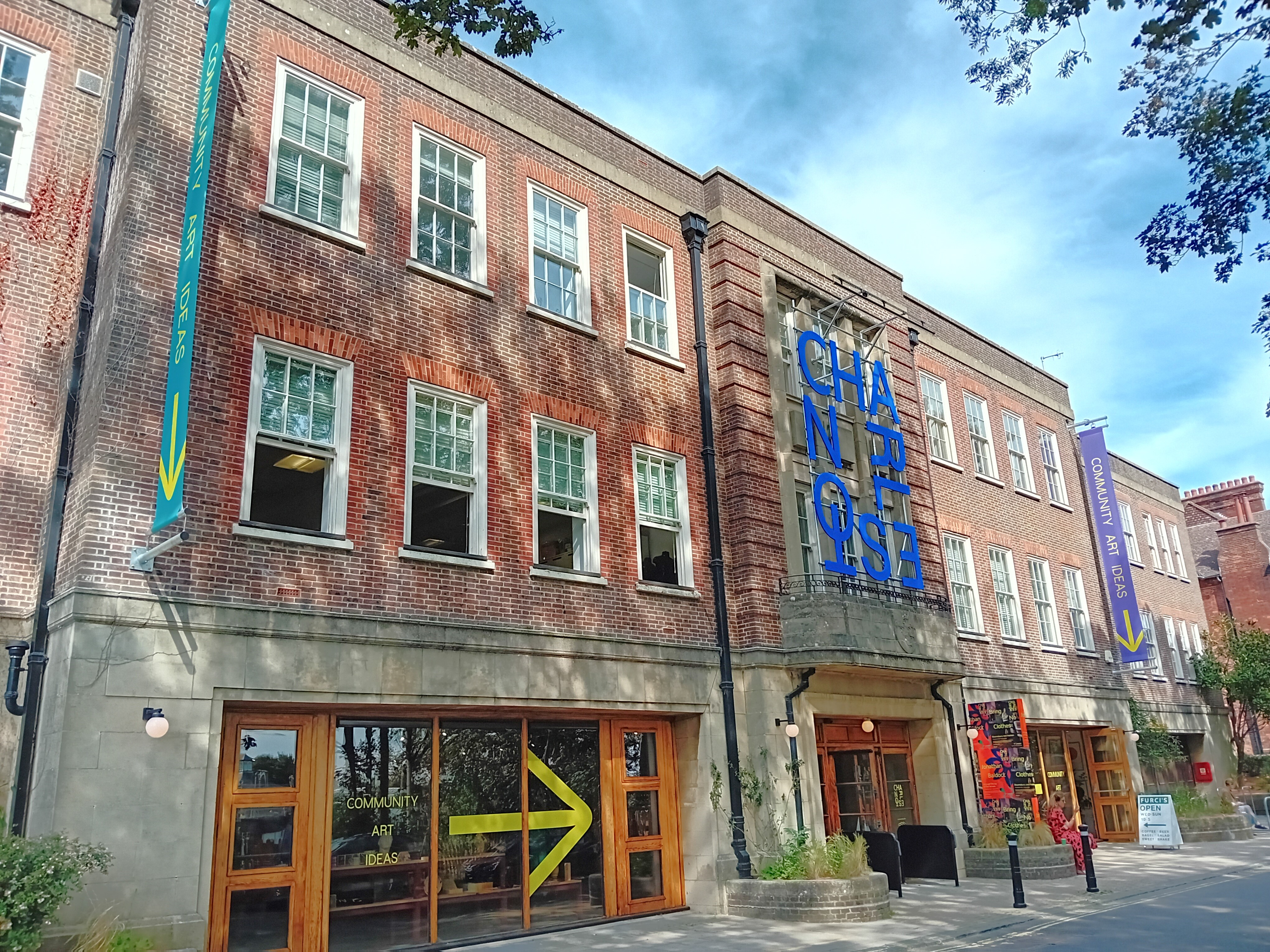
Southover House: County Council offices 1938–1998

When first created the council met at the old County Hall in Lewes, now known as Lewes Crown Court, which had been built in 1812 as a courthouse and had served as the meeting place for the quarter sessions which preceded the county council.

The council outgrew the space available there and in 1928 it purchased a large sixteenth century house called Pelham House to use as additional offices. In 1938 the council extended Pelham House to include a council chamber and committee rooms and also built a large office block called Southover House in the former gardens of Pelham House, with the two neighbouring buildings then serving as the council's main offices and meeting place, and the old County Hall reverting to being purely a judicial facility.

By the 1960s the council again needed more space and so the current County Hall was built. Southover House was sold to Lewes District Council in 1998. Full council meetings continued to be held in the council chamber at Pelham House until 2003 when a new council chamber was created in the 1968 County Hall and Pelham House was sold.

== Elections ==
Since the last boundary changes in 2017 the council has comprised 50 councillors representing 50 electoral divisions. Elections are held every four years.

== Notable members ==
- Lord Rupert Nevill (1954–1967)
