= Clayton to Offham Escarpment =

Landform in Sussex, England

Coordinates: 50.897°N 0.075°W

- Site of Special Scientific Interest
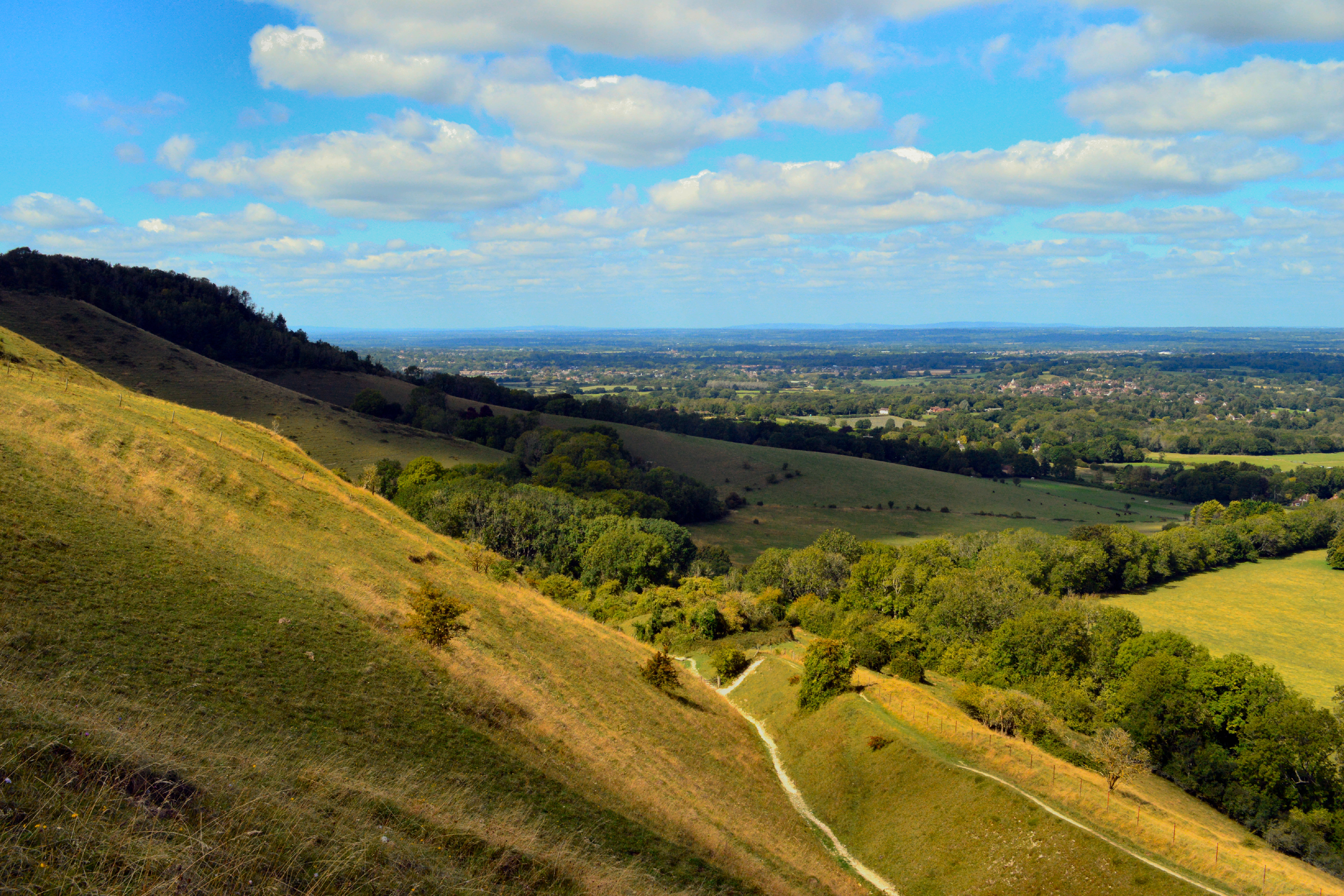
- View from Western Brow over Westmeston bostal and beyond
- Location of Clayton to Offham Escarpment.
- Area of search: East Sussex; West Sussex
- Grid reference: TQ 355 126
- Interest: Biological
- Area: 422.5 hectares (1,044 acres)
- Notification date: 1986
- Location map: Magic Map

Clayton to Offham Escarpment is a 422.5-hectare (1,044-acre) linear biological Site of Special Scientific Interest (SSSI) which runs from Clayton in West Sussex to Lewes in East Sussex. Its ownership and management is divided between over fifteen landowners and farmers. Parts of Ditchling's Downs, e.g. TQ 323 133, and the scarp between Blackcap and Mount Harry, e.g. TQ 378 124, are owned by the National Trust. What remains of Ditchling Tenantry Down common (24 hectares (59 acres)) at Ditchling Beacon is leased to the Sussex Wildlife Trust.

Unlike the scarp top, the steeply sloping chalk grassland of the escarpment has been spared modern farming ploughing, fertilising and spraying of herbicides. Instead the area has been used for traditional low-level animal grazing and as a consequence the site is still pristine chalk grassland, which has created a ten kilometre stretch of wild flower meadows. Such areas have been described as Europe's tropical rainforests and the National Trust tell us, "They're home to an incredibly rich and diverse range of plant and insect life". Up to 40 species of flowering plants can be found in one square metre of chalk grassland.

The particular character of this range of hills is their north facing aspect, meaning they can be shadowy and receive less sunlight. There is glaucous sedge, autumn gentian, marjoram and squinancywort. There are several species of wild, native orchid and the area is rich in mosses and liverworts. The botanical richness means it also supports biodiverse fauna. There are also areas of ancient woodland and ancient scrub and the site has a rich community of breeding birds, and a number of red listed bird species in the highest conservation concern category.

== Escarpment bostals ==
There are at least eleven named bostals, ancient paths, that run up and down the scarp and many more unnamed. Traditionally the bostal tracks were used by shepherds taking the sheep flocks onto the Downs to graze each morning and by peasants taking cattle, pigs, hay, crops, wood, minerals and other products back and forth between the coast-ward manors and their wealden outliers. They are generally very steep and many of them have cut deep into the chalk.

The name bostal may come from the combination of beorg (rounded hill) and stigel (small steep hill path). Beorg is also the origin of the word ‘barrow’ - the prehistoric burial mounds - because it denoted a small round, often artificial hill.

From west to east the named bostals on the escarpment include Clayton Bostal, Keymer Bostal, Burnhouse Bostal, Ditchling Bostal, Middleton Bostal, Westemeston Bostal, Streat Bostal, Plumpton Bostal, Novington Bostal, Warningore Bostal and Offham Bostal.

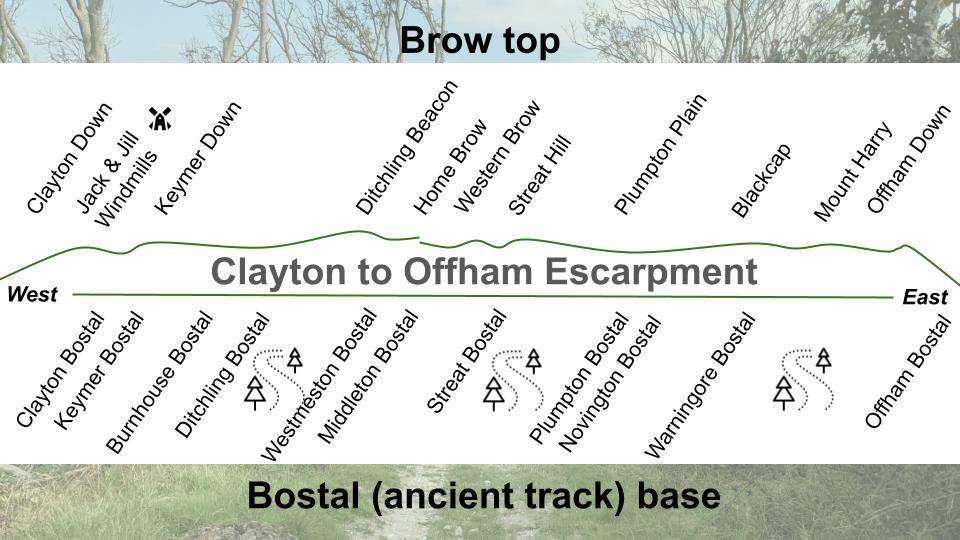
Clayton to Offham escarpment from west to east, the bostal bases and the brow top

The above diagram shows the bostals and scarp peaks in their relative positions from west to east. The bostals positions are from the bottom, north of the scarp. They reach the top in different positions as many of them traverse the scarp diagonally. However, the only bostals to cross are the Middleton and the Westmeston bostals.

== From West to East ==
The Clayton to Offham Escarpment passes through eight parishes including Hassocks, Ditchling, Westmeston, Streat, Plumpton, East Chiltington, St John Without and Hamsey. Along the ten kilometre stretch, it has many special slopes, woodlands and chalk pits.

=== Clayton Down ===
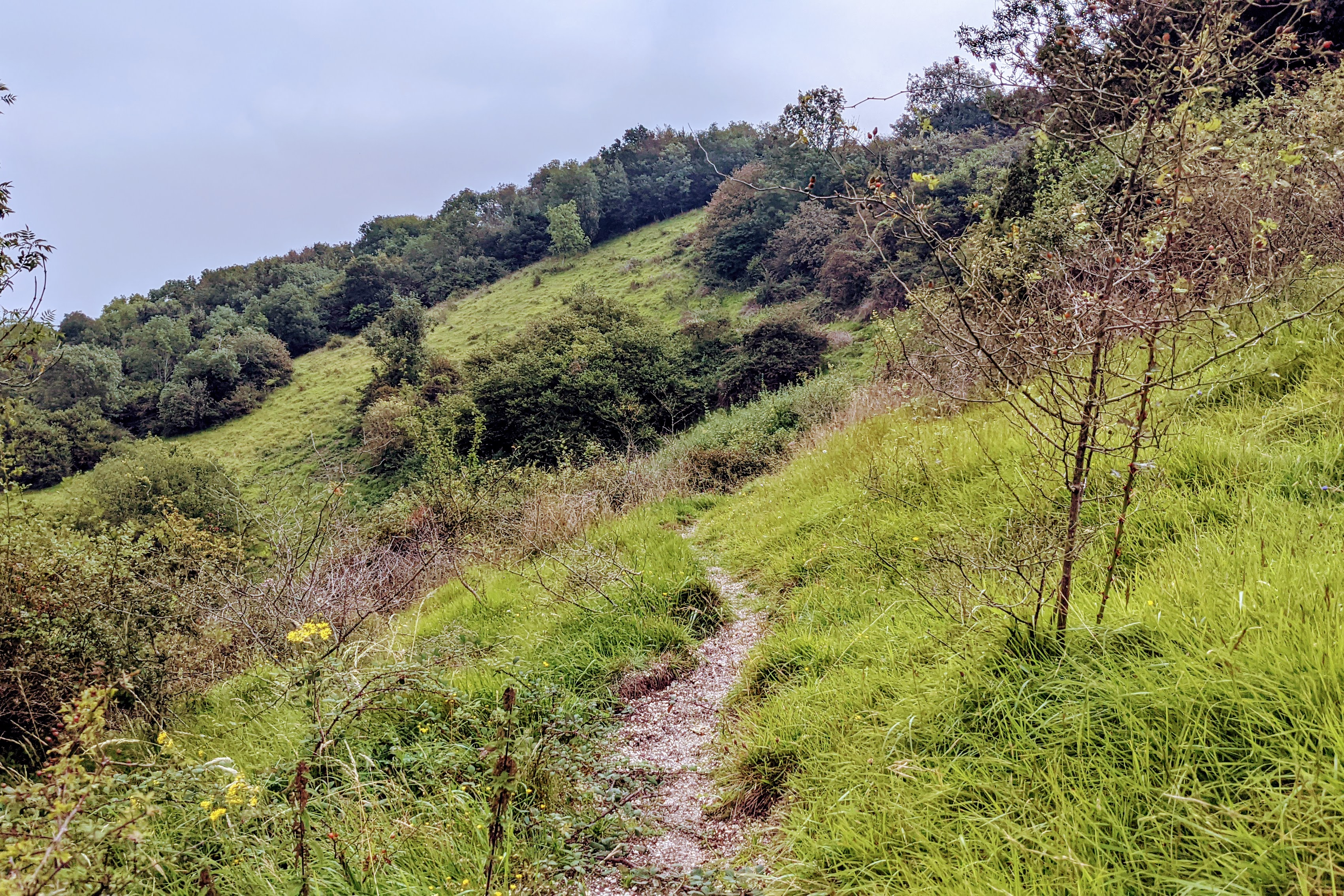
Clayton Down, looking east towards Clayton Holt with Ditching Beacon beyond

To the very west of the escarpment is Clayton Down (TQ 306 133). The scarp slope's chalk grassland embraces an ancient scrub thicket which is an archaic cornucopia of wild, self-seeded fruits. Few sites on this part of the Downs can match its richness. There are blackberries, crab apples, sloe berries, pink and orange spindle berries and buckthorn. There are four species of rose, typical of wild orchards such as the apple-scented sweet briar. There may be as many at least twenty-five scrub species, eighteen of which have fleshy and colourful fruits and eleven of which of are members of the rose family. Robin's pincushion can be seen on the roses and dogwood.

=== Clayton Holt ===
Clayton Holt (TQ 310 134) stands to the east of Clayton Down. The Anglo Saxon place name 'Holt' suggests a woodland dominated by one species, though there are many types of tree here now, including an interesting circle of spindle trees. Large-leaved lime was still present in the Holt at least until 1838. It was a common species of the middle post-glacial period, but was cleared by early farming communities. Where it persists it is an indicator of ancient, perhaps primary woodland. There are still two hybrid large-leaved, small-leaved limes in the Holt and it is also one of the best places on the Downs to see veteran beeches. There is an old record circa 1978 for lesser butterfly orchid.

=== Keymer Down ===
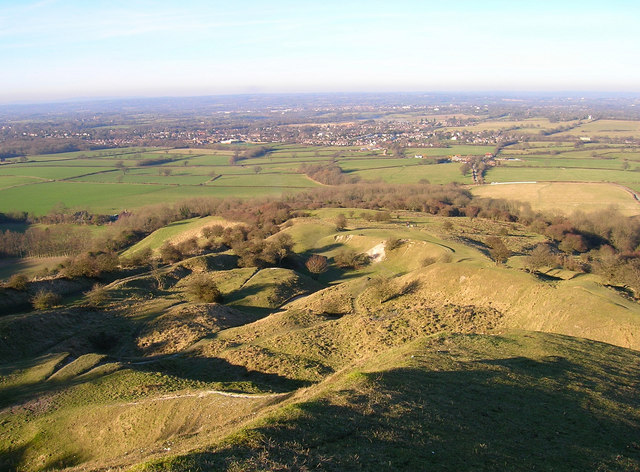
Keymer Down, former chalk pits

Keymer Down scarp (TQ 315 133) is a site of ancient quarries and is now an undulating slope of velvety turf. The Keymer bostals provide a pleasurable passage up or down the escarpment for walkers and mountain bikers. In spring a dwarfed version of field fleawort and chalk milkwort grows on the short turf edge of the quarries. Large bloody-nosed beetles can be found in the bedstraw, with chalk carpet moth, chalkhill blue butterflies flitting between the flowers. Meadow pipit, skylark, yellowhammer, buzzard and ravens commonly fly overhead. There is a rich assemblage of chalk grassland mosses, liverworts and lichen on the shortest sward and on the bare exposed chalk of the old quarries. Juniper bushes that are likely to have been present since the last ice age have been lost in the past century.

=== Ditchling Beacon and Tenantry Down ===
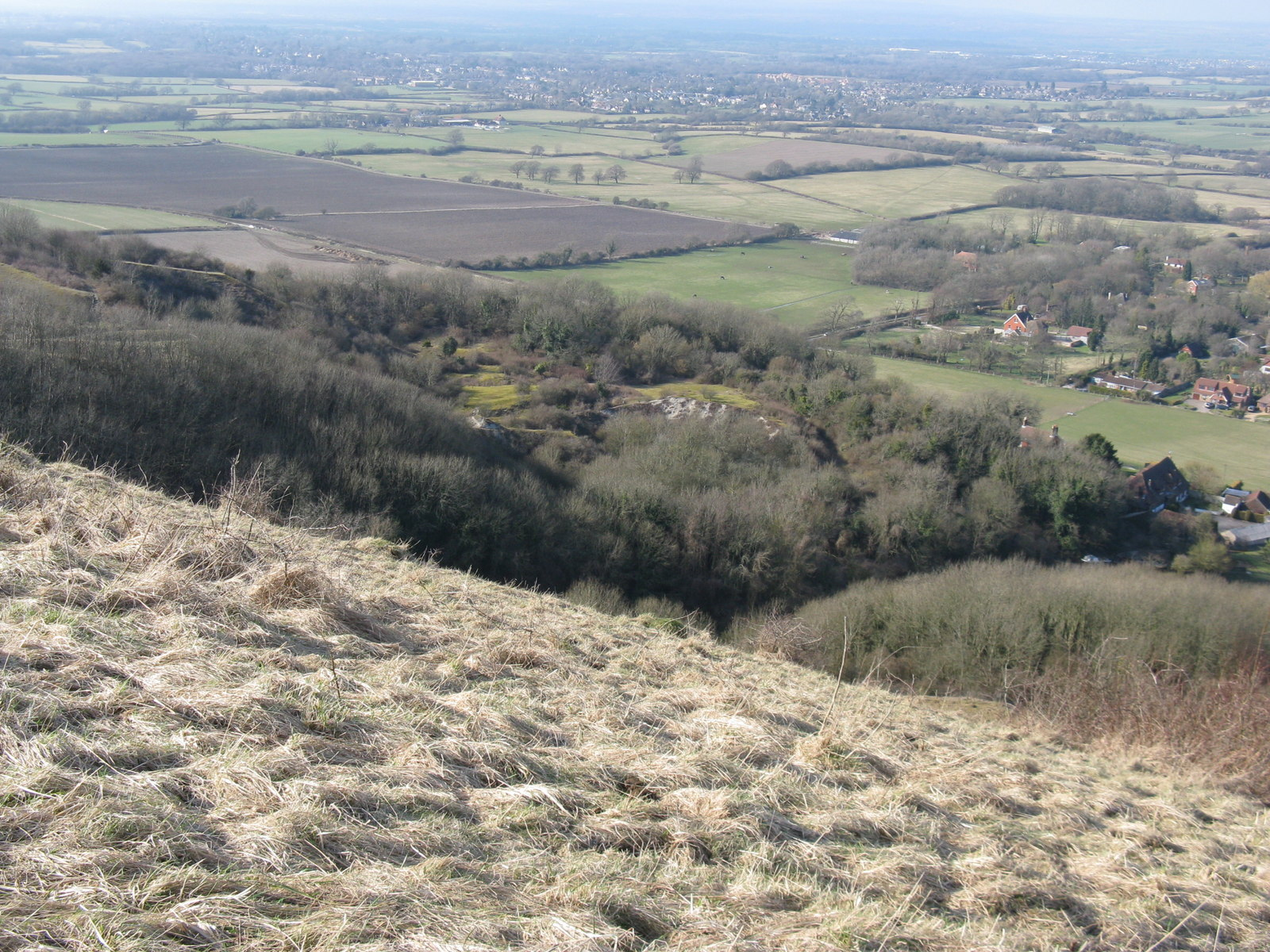
Disused chalk pits, on scarp slope north of Ditchling Beacon

Rising from Under Hill Lane is Tenantry Down, which summits at Ditchling Beacon. At 813 ft (248 metres), Ditchling Beacon (TQ 331 130) is the highest point on the eastern Downs. It was an Iron Age Fort and has a number of barrows. There are three ancient bostals that ascend the slopes to Beacon, the central of which, Ditchling Bostal, is now the busy motor road. The bostals (two unnamed) pass some of the best remaining chalk grasslands in East Sussex and is an important area for wildlife including now rare plants, butterflies and moths.

The chalk pit on the scarp slope, where there is limited sunlight and damp conditions on the steep ground, is famous for Bryophytes (mosses and liverworts) with over 120 having been reported here. Chalk grassland-loving species such as Rhytidiadelphus triquetrus and Neckera crispa grow in abundance on the north-facing slopes along with Fissidens dubius, Campylium protensum, Dicranum bonjeanii and Hylocomium splendens. The liverwort Scapania aspera grows on the steeper slopes. The rare moss Thuidium assimile is present and the tiny mosses Seligeria calcarea and Tortella inflexa grow on chalk and flint.

One hundred metres or so to the west from the bottom of the main Ditchling Bostals is Burnhouse Bostal which reaches the top above Keymer Down. Along Burnhouse Bostal, the red listed birds of high conservation concern, spotted flycatcher, bred in 2021 indicating the importance of the SSSI. Scavenging red kite are an increasingly common sight from the beacon too,

=== Westmeston Down ===
The Westmeston Down rises from Westmeston Farm. Two bostals, Westmeston and Middleton (TQ 343 130), meet at the top (TQ 338 130), between Western Brow and Home Brow. The two paths divide a large cluster of round barrows, (TQ 339 128), which are easier to make out on the western side than the eastern side. In Spring, the Westmeston bostal is rich with wildflower and harbours a huge old ash pollard (TQ 340 130), which many seek out to admire. There are old limekilns in Westmeston chalk pit and the chalk pit south of The Gote, (TQ 348 132). The slopes have well-formed terracettes, ridges, formed by centuries of grazing by sheep.

=== Streat Hill ===
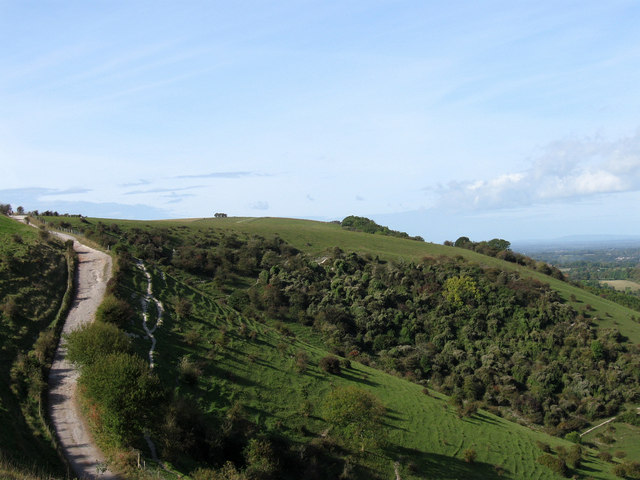
Streat Hill viewed from the escarpment near Ditchling Cross. The track leading down the hill is Plumpton Bostal.

Streat Hill rises to 224m above sea level. There are two tumuli or bowl barrows, though they are scarcely visible. They have been termed by archaeologists the Western Brow round barrow cemetery. Stanmer manor used Streat bostal for livestock movements between the Downs and its Wealden outliers. The bostal track is deep, steep and zig-zags.

Wayfaring Tree can be found across the steep slopes and the trees here have been known host to the scarce orange-tailed clearwing moth, whose caterpillars burrow into the branches. There are purple bar, black pyrausta and burnet companion day flying moths in the area and the soft turf has the characteristic chalk grassland moss species bubble wrap moss, Neckera crispa, slender comb moss, Ctenidium molluscum, and broom fork moss. Dicranum scoparium.

The Streat Hill bostal and scarp slope (TQ 351 130) has long been ungrazed, and as a consequence has lost much of the species-rich chalk grassland to invasive scrub. Despite the biodiversity they bring, only islands of that very rich turf remain, usually on the bostal's deep cut sides.

To the west of the Streat Hill is the Queen Victoria Jubilee plantation (TQ 348 130), which forms the sign of a V on the middle of the bare scarp slope. Six different tree species were planted in 1887 to mark Queen Victoria's Silver Jubilee.

=== Plumpton Hill ===
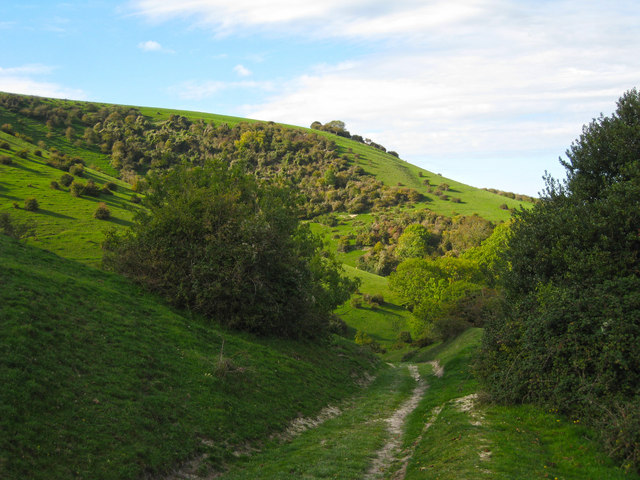
Plumpton Hill, The Coombe, South Downs

There are two bostals that run up the side of this section of the scarp, the Plumpton (TQ 360 128) and the Novington bostal (TQ 370 128). The Plumpton bostal rises from the Half Moon Inn. The field opposite the Half Moon was known as the Brighton Laine according to the Tithe map of 1839, perhaps because it marked the beginning of the Downland route to the town. The bostal was concreted in the Second World War to take vehicles to the training grounds on the plateau. It looks down over a stretch of scarp which is still owned by Brighton Council, though leased to Plumpton Agricultural College. It has a good assemblage of Down pasture flowers and secondary woodland at the bottom is rich in species, such as bluebells and ramsons. Just to the east of the bostal is a 100-foot cross has been carved into the chalk, called Ditchling Cross, probably made by the monks of St Pancras Priory in Lewes. The cross is no longer white, but to the knowledgeable eye it is still visible due to its lighter-coloured grass and when the sun is low and the depression is in shadow it can be made out from several miles away.

=== Novington Scarp ===
To the east is the Novington chalk pit (TQ 370 128) through which the Novington bostal runs. Above it, a wood was planted in the nineteenth century called The Beeches, which has now spread more widely.

At the top of Plumpton Hill and Novington Scarp there are three clusters of round barrows on this on each of the three main spurs that jut forward. They are low so they are not obvious although there is one on the arable just south of the South Downs Way and just west of Novington Plantation that is a yard tall (TQ 364 125).

=== Ashcombe Bottom ===
Unlike the rest of this SSSI, Ashcombe Bottom is a south facing woodland valley that is on the other side of the ridge from the rest of the escarpment at Blackcap. The area has many glades and rides with a chalk grassland flora and fauna. There are a good range of songbirds including bullfinch, song thrush and summer breeding warblers, including blackcap and garden warbler. There are deer present and dormouse boxes have been put up. Sheep have access to some parts of the wood.

=== Coombe Plantation ===
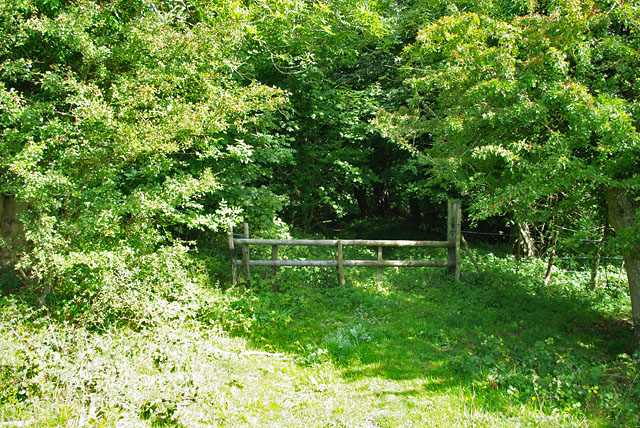
Path into Coombe Plantation

The Coombe Plantation (TQ 386 122) is a relatively young wood, planted around 1800. Above south west corner of the woodland are the Blackcap and Mount Harry peaks. The plantation has a cool and lofty interior of tall ash, sycamore, surviving beech and occasional horse chestnut. The biggest trees are along the lower boundary, although many were blown down in the 1987 and 1992 gales, particularly at its eastern end. The fallen beech carcasses are home to many fungi including green stain, turkey tail, lemon disco, jelly rot, porcelain fungus and dryad's saddle. Collared earthstar is here amongst the leaf litter. The spring flowers are most plentiful at the base of slope. Elsewhere things like bluebells are scarce, although there are swarms of early purple orchids upslope. In the shadier parts, such as along the bostal, there are profuse growths of hart's tongue fern.

=== Offham Combe and Down ===
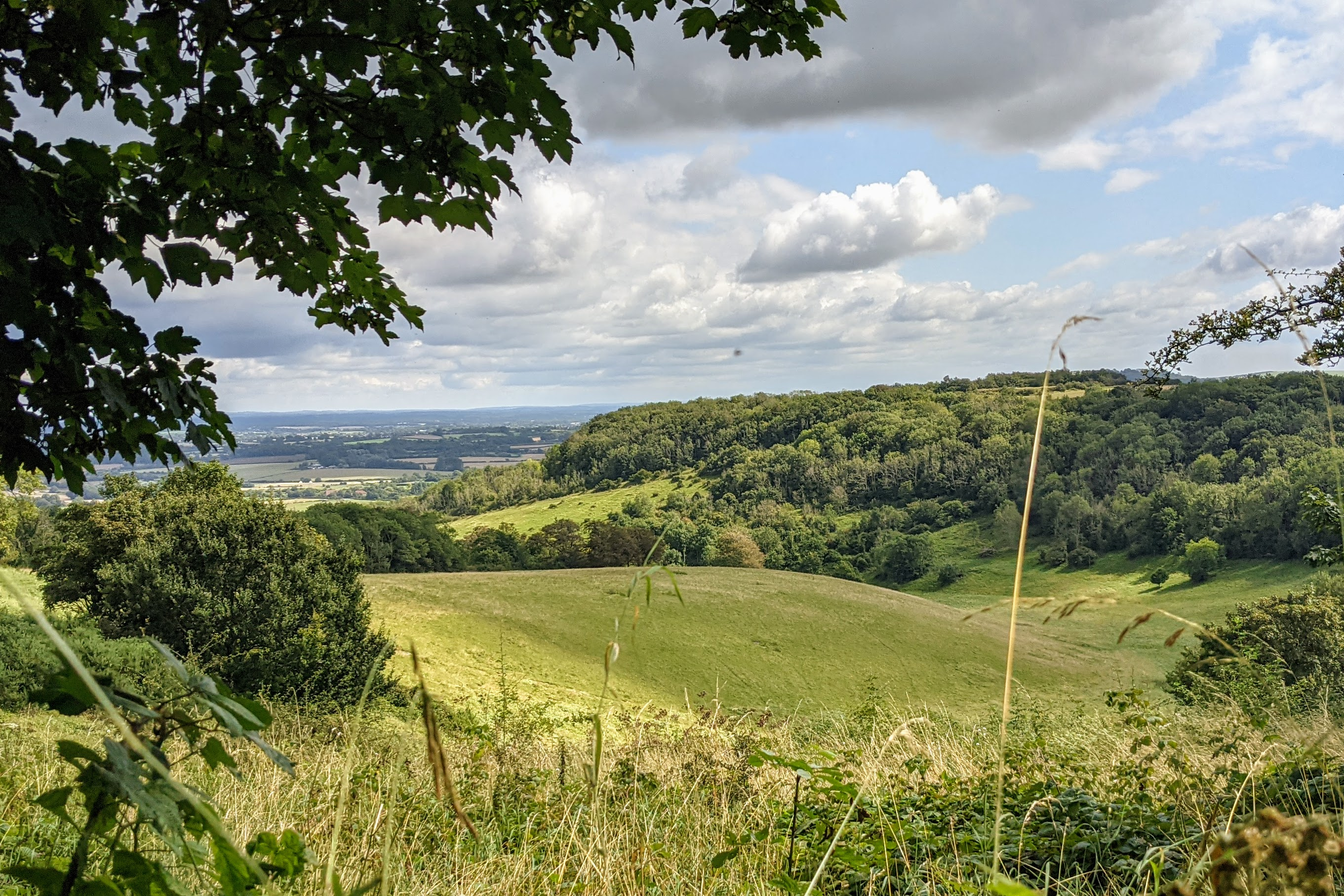
Offham Down, East Sussex, looking north towards Offham village and Hamsey

This is a special place, locally called "Happy Valley". The area has a long history. There is an evocative group of ten Saxon barrows on the short turfed, flatter ground of the spur, and further barrows up the hill but there are either destroyed or sunk in tangled scrub. There is a peculiar and attractive two-track ancient bostal which rises up the valley side from Offham. It is thought that after marching from Fletching, the London troops under Simon De Montfort walked up this bostal on the dawn of the day of the Battle of Lewes. They will have risen to the spur, which Coombe Plantation now partly covers, and formed the left flank of the rebel army. Poorly armed and trained they were swept away back down the scarp by the royalist cavalry, before the cavalry over-reached themselves and De Montfort's other troops battled down into Lewes and victory.

The valley sides are rich in biodiversity in all seasons, now as they were then. In spring they have milkwort, cowslip and lesser dandelion, . At midsummer there are glow-worms and bastard toadflax. In high summer there is Pride of Sussex rampion and, later, sheets of devil's-bit scabious. There are areas of acidic soils, and in these areas heathy plants, rare on chalk grassland, may still be present, such as heath dog-violet and mosses like Bryum rubens and Pleurochaete squarrosa. In autumn there are still old meadow fungi, including many species of waxcaps, earth tongues, coral fungi and pink gill.

There used to be purple heather on the crown of Offham Hill for which it gained it the nickname ‘Little Scotland’ in Victorian times. It is secondary woodland, now. However, things could have gone worse for the biodiversity of the area. Although it is part of an SSSI, in 1997 the farmer wished to plough much of the tractor accessible ground to grow flax, which was then attracting hefty European Union subsidies even on such protected sites. English Nature did not to use their powers and the farmer commenced ploughing. Nature conservationists attempted to block the plough, but the farmer returned at night. The struggle then escalated and conservationists demonstrated, set up camp on the land and started to organize its ‘unploughing’ by turning over and refitting the sods. Local people also turned out in force. Luckily the battle took place during the general election, so the Conservatives and Labour competed to show their conservation mettle and the special downland scarp was saved.
