= Ditchling Beacon =

Hill in East Sussex, England

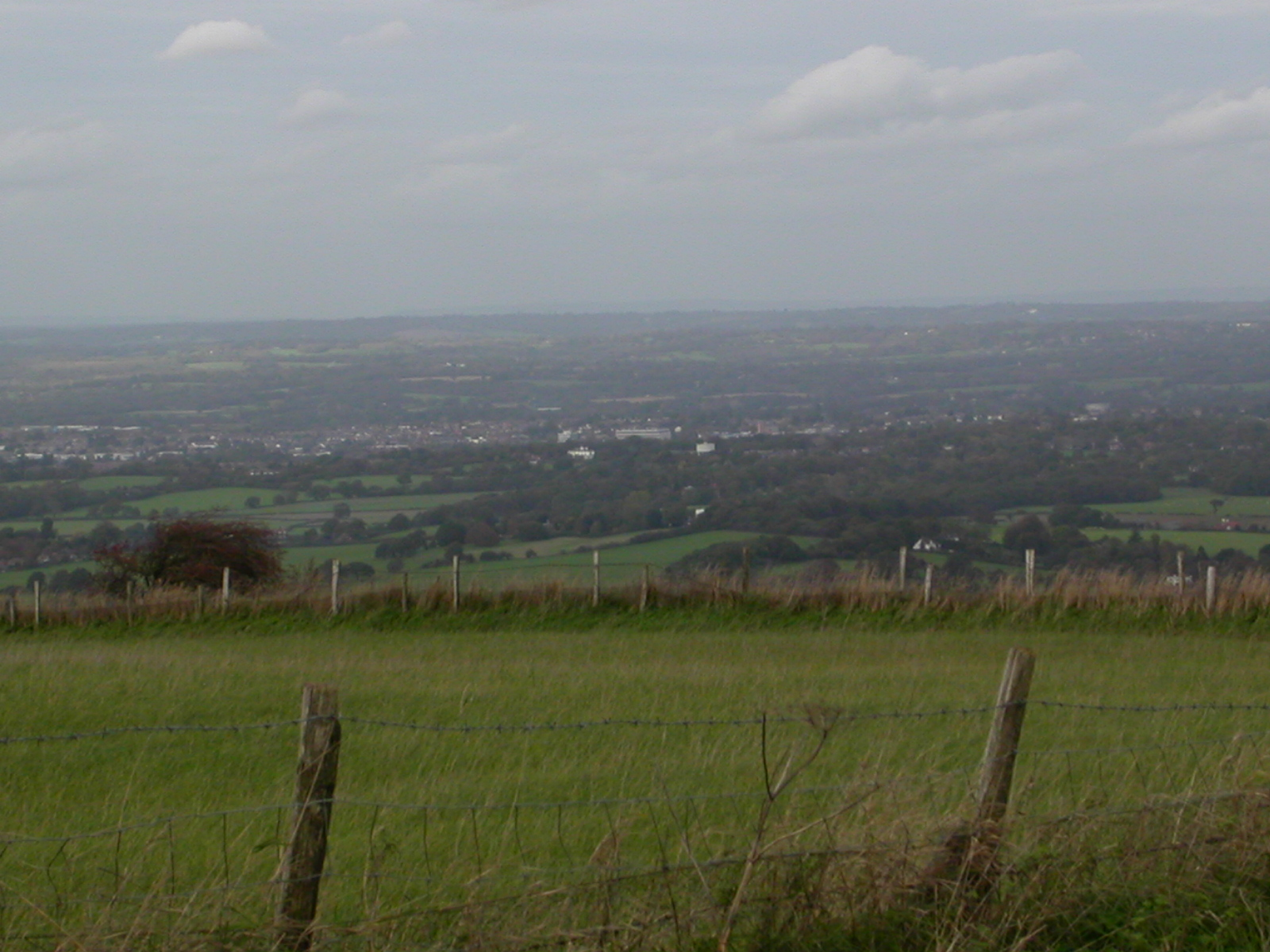
- Northward view from the summit of Ditchling Beacon, looking towards Hassocks and Burgess Hill. 27 October 2006.

Highest point
- Elevation: 248 m (814 ft)
- Prominence: 213 m (699 ft)
- Parent peak: Leith Hill
- Listing: Marilyn, County Top
- Coordinates: 50°54′07″N 0°06′25″W

Geography
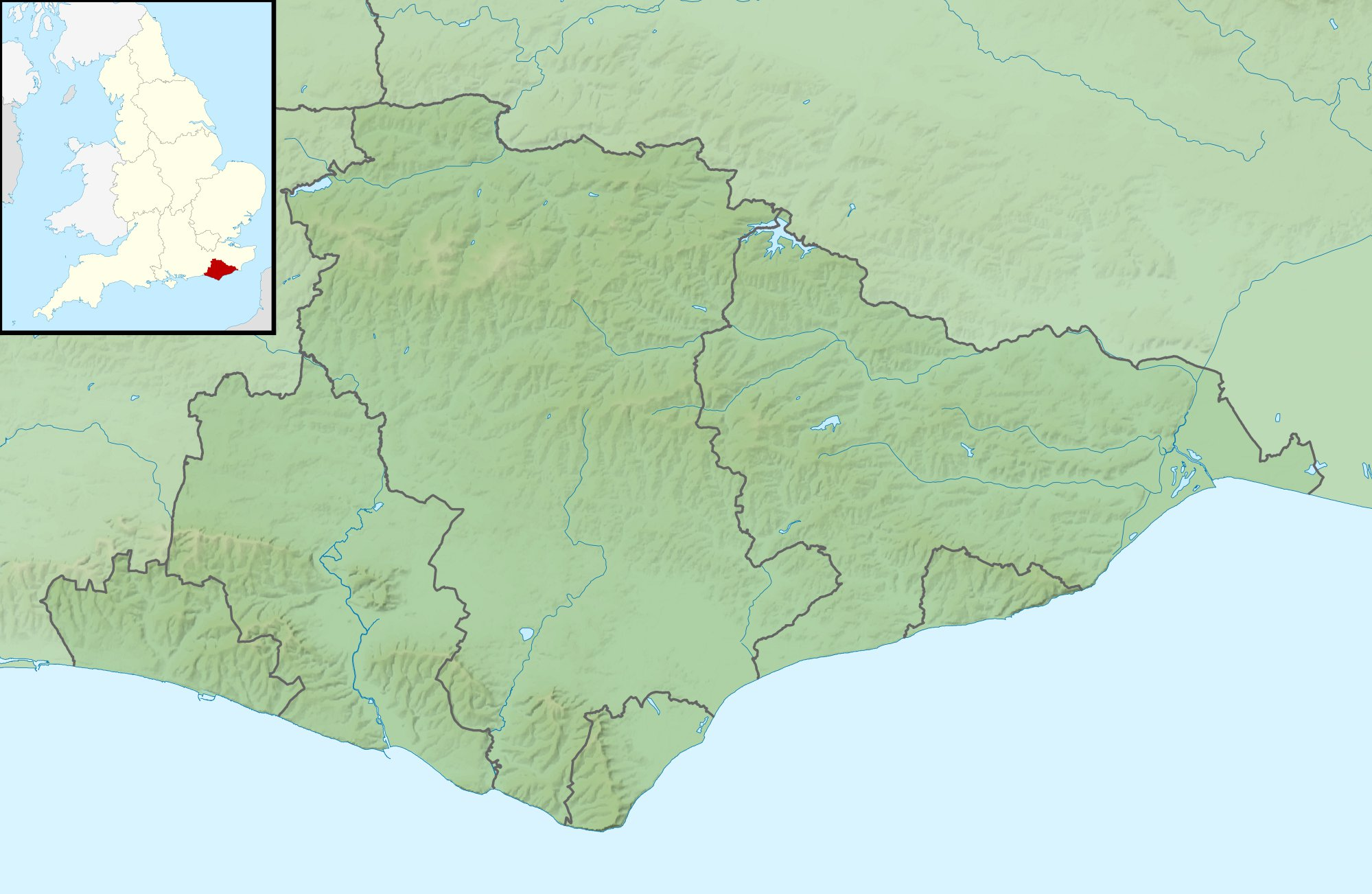
- Location within East Sussex
- Location: South Downs, England
- OS grid: TQ331130
- Topo map: OS Landranger 198, Explorer OL11

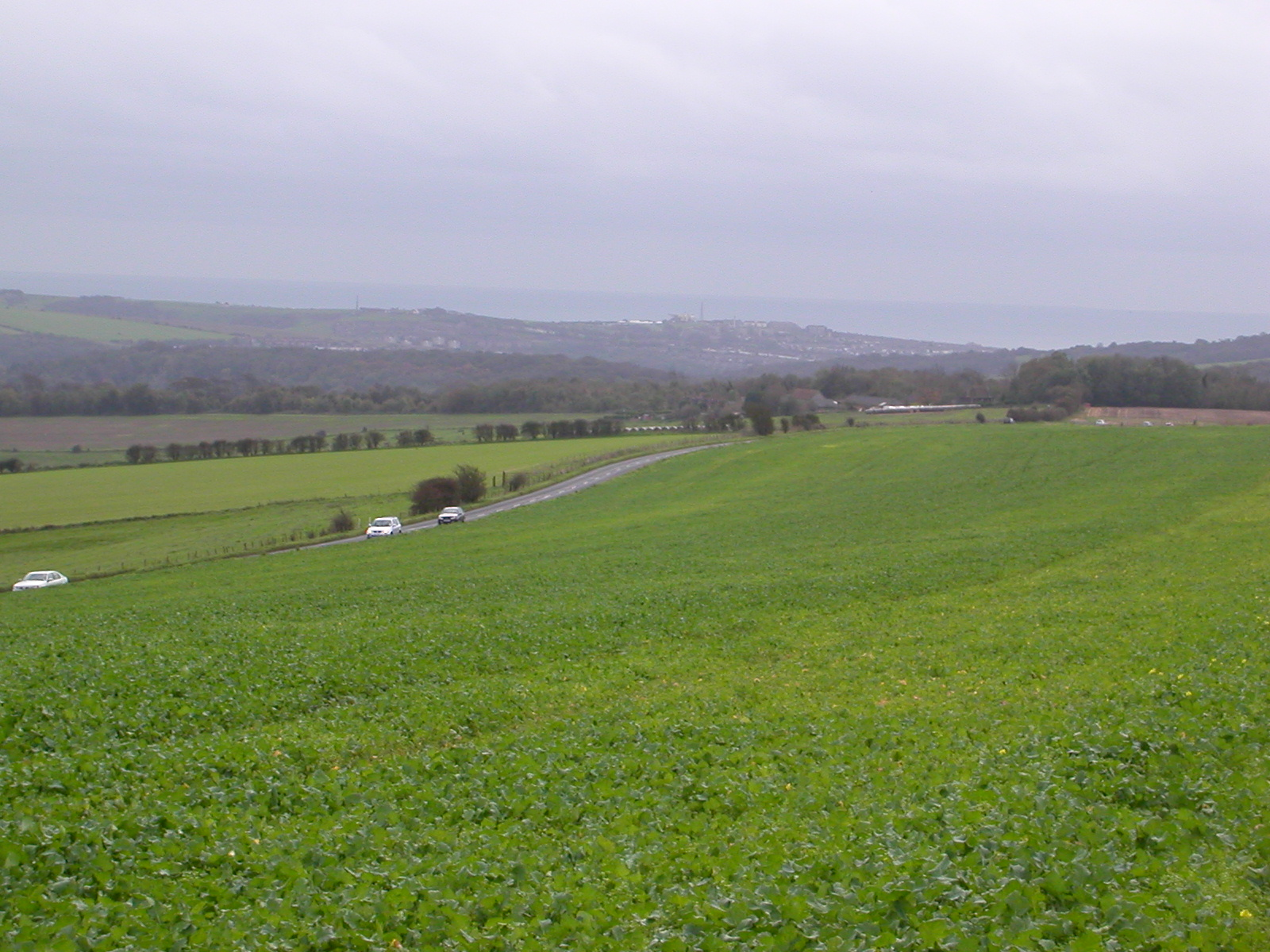
View from just south of the summit, looking towards the eastern side of Brighton. The road is named Ditchling Road at this point

Ditchling Beacon is the highest point in East Sussex, England, with an elevation of 248 m (814 ft). It is south of Ditchling and to the north-east of Brighton. It is a large chalk hill with a particularly steep northern face, covered with open grassland and sheep-grazing areas. It is the third-highest point on the South Downs, behind Butser Hill (270 m (890 ft)) and Crown Tegleaze (253 m (830 ft)).

A road runs from Ditchling up and across the northern face and down into the northern suburbs of Brighton, and there are car parks at the summit and the northern base. Various charity, sporting and other events which are run regularly between London and Brighton incorporate this steep road as a challenging part of their route. It was also featured as a climb on the first of two days' racing in Britain in the 1994 Tour de France. The Tour organisers gave Ditchling Beacon a climb category of 4. 20 years later it was included as part of the route of the seventh stage of the 2014 Tour of Britain from Camberley to Brighton.

Ditchling Beacon is part of the Clayton to Offham Escarpment biological Site of Special Scientific Interest and an area of 24 hectares (59 acres) is a nature reserve managed by the Sussex Wildlife Trust. The slopes represent some of the best chalk downland in the area.

== History ==
Ditchling Beacon was an Iron Age hill fort and its ramparts are detectable on their north and east sides (TQ 332 131), though the overgrown vegetation and fences makes it difficult to walk them in parts. The eastern ramparts bound a fragment of derelict chalk heath, which is disappearing under scrub and rank grassland. The Beacon represented an excellent position for defensive purposes as it dominates adjoining parts of the South Downs ridge, and particularly the much lower ground to the north (where the villages and towns of Mid Sussex are now located) in the Lower Weald. A single defensive bank and ditch enclosed an area of approximately 5.5 hectares (13.6 acres), making it one of the larger camps in Sussex. Relatively little excavation of the fort has been carried out, however, and the existence of dew ponds, paths and tracks, as well as regular ploughing activity over the years, reduces the likelihood of any significant discoveries in the future.

In prehistory people descended the scarp by the lower bostal (east of motor road) to go north across the Weald. This route kept their feet somewhat dryer, following the watershed route between the Adur and Ouse catchments. It went north past The Nye, over Lodge Hill, Ditchling (with its round barrow), past Oldlands Windmill and over Broadhill. It was a route free of soggy fords or wonky clapper bridges. Later in early medieval times, the swineherds from Patcham, Withdean, Stanmer and probably Brighton drove their pigs down these bostals to their swine pastures at Wivelsfield and beyond to Worth Forest.

It was used to warn the Queen about the coming Spanish Armada.

== Biodiversity ==
A wide variety of plants can be found on Ditchling Beacon, especially during the summer. Flowers and herbs suited to chalk grassland, such as marjoram, thyme and certain types of orchid (notably the common spotted orchid), are often reported. Butterflies are common; a notable example is the Chalkhill Blue, which is particularly well suited to uncultivated chalk downland areas. There are also Green Hairstreak and Orange Tip butterflies on the slopes.

=== Bryophytes ===
The chalkpit on the scarp slope, where there is limited sunlight, damp conditions on the steep ground, is famous for Bryophytes (mosses and liverworts). with over 120 having been reported here. The robust chalk grassland specialists Rhytidiadelphus triquetrus and Neckera crispa grow in abundance on the north-facing slopes along with Fissidens dubius, Campylium protensum, Dicranum bonjeanii and Hylocomium splendens. The liverwort Scapania aspera grows on the steeper slopes. The rare moss Thuidium assimile covers the base of the chalk pit and the tiny mosses Seligeria calcarea and Tortella inflexa grow on chalk and flint.

== Geodesy ==
Ditchling Beacon was the origin (meridian) of the 6 inch and 1:2500 Ordnance Survey maps of Sussex.

== Access ==
There are three bostals that run up the escarpment to Ditchling Beacon, the middle one of which carries the motor road. The other two are walkable, but most people do not notice the higher (west of motor road) and lower (east of motor road) bostals, which give easy access, because the slopes are still broken up by thickets despite Sussex Wildlife Trusts's valiant and ongoing efforts to clear the scrub. In contrast, many people scramble enthusiastically up and down the slopes of the Beacon's sister site, Devil's Dyke.

The only road access to the summit is via the steep and narrow Beacon Road, which runs from the centre of Ditchling village and takes the name Ditchling Road once the summit is reached and the descent into Brighton commences. Beacon Road connects with the B2116, which connects several villages close to the foot of the South Downs with the outskirts of Lewes, the county town of East Sussex. Underhill Lane, a minor road directly at the foot of the Downs, crosses Beacon Road adjacent to the car park. The road then commences a steep ascent of the northern slope, from 90 to 248 metres above sea level in just over 1.6 kilometres (one mile) sweeping from side to side around a number of sharp bends.

At the summit is a small car park, owned and operated by the National Trust (which also owns and manages approximately 1.6 hectares (4 acres) of land on the hill).

From this point, Ditchling Road descends through open downland for approximately 4 kilometres (2.5 mi) until the edge of the Brighton built-up area is reached at Hollingbury. The road crosses the A27 Brighton Bypass and continues as a busy suburban road for more than 5 kilometres (3.1 mi) into the centre of Brighton.

Brighton & Hove, Brighton's main bus operator, has operated special services from locations in the city centre to Ditchling Beacon, via Ditchling Road, since 2002. Route 79, often operated using open-topped buses, originally ran during the summer only, but its increasing popularity means that as from 2006, some journeys have also been operated during the winter.

A footpath and bridleway runs across the ridge from east to west, taking in the summit; this forms part of the South Downs Way. The road is considered too dangerous to walk along now as there are no traffic calming measures along it.

Access by rail can be achieved from Hassocks, from where a well-used path runs alongside the line to Clayton, at the western end of Underhill Lane. From here, access can be gained to several paths and bridleways leading up to Ditchling Beacon itself, or points slightly to the west on the South Downs Way.
