= Tortella =

Tortella may refer to:

- Tortellà, a village in the province of Girona and autonomous community of Catalonia, Spain.
- Tortella (plant), a moss genus in the family Pottiaceae.
