= Paradisia Alpine Botanical Garden =

Botanical garden in Valnontey, Cogne, Aosta Valley, Italy

Coordinates: 45°35′06″N 07°20′13″E

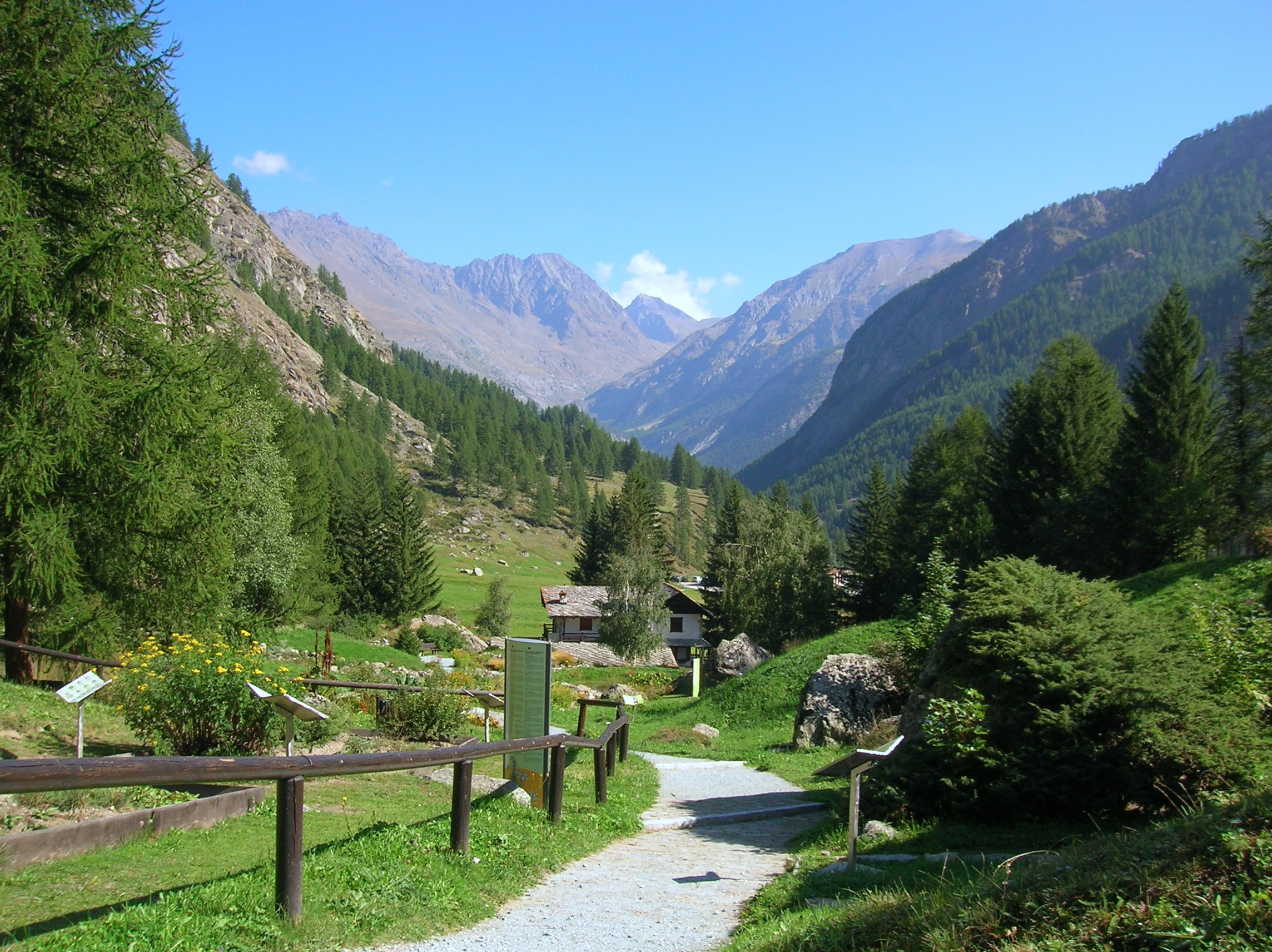
Paradisia Alpine Botanical Garden

The Giardino Alpino Paradisia or Jardin alpin Paradisia (French), is an alpine nature preserve and botanical garden located at 1700 meters altitude in the Gran Paradiso National Park at Valnontey, Cogne, Aosta Valley, Italy. It is open daily in the warmer months.

The garden was founded in 1955, and named for Paradisea liliastrum (St. Bruno's Lily). It is primarily a nature preserve but also contains man-made reconstructions of nearby mountain environments, including wetlands, moraines, and limestone debris.

The garden currently contains about 1,000 species of plants native to the Alps and Apennines, as well as specimens from other mountains in Europe, Asia, and America. Species include Chenopodium bonus-henricus, Berberis vulgaris, Eriophorum scheuchzeri, Pinguicula vulgaris, Rumex alpinus, Rosa canina, Rosa pendulina, Sedum reflexum, Sedum album, Sempervivum arachnoideum, Sempervivum tectorum, and Urtica dioica.

According to a survey by Schumacker and Soldán, the garden's mosses includes Acaulon muticum, Barbula unguiculata, Bartramia ithyphylla, Brachythecium salebrosum, Bryoerythrophyllum recurvirostre, Bryum argenteum, Bryum lanatum, Bryum capillare, Bryum Klinggraeffii, Campylium chrysophyllum, Ceratodon piliferum, Desmatodon latifolius, Didymodon cylindricum, Encalypta vulgaris, Eucladium hians, Eurhynchium praelongum, Eurhynchium diversifolium, Fissidens bryoides, Grimmia elatior, Grimmia ovalis, Homomallium incurvatum, Hypnum revolutum, Mnium spinulosum, Orthotrichum alpestre, Orthotrichum anomalum, Orthotrichum rupestre, Pohlia cruda, Pohlia nutans, Racomitrium canescens, Schistidium apocarpum, Tortula ruralis, and Tortula subulata.

== See also ==
- List of botanical gardens in Italy
