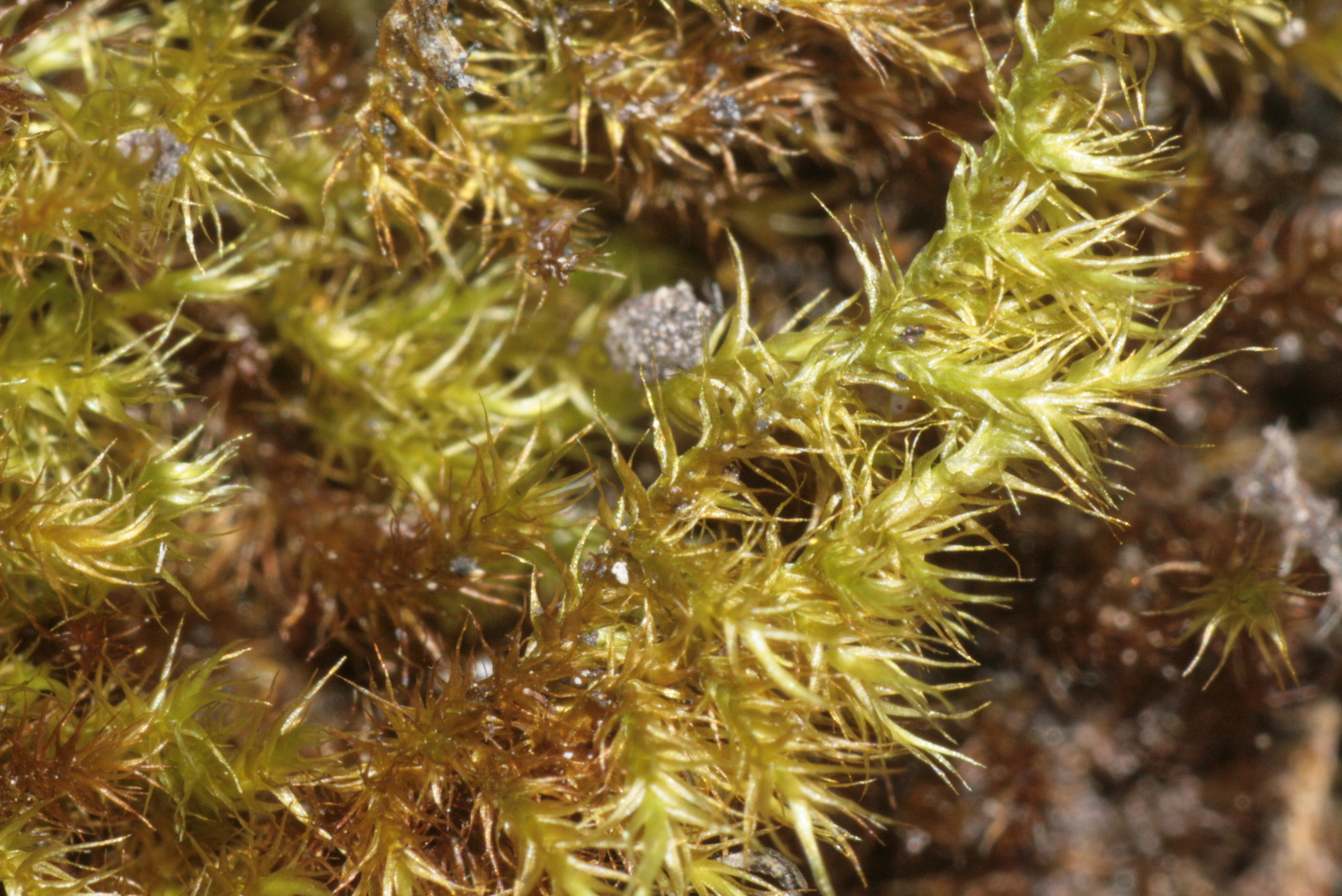
- Campylium chrysophyllum

Scientific classification
- Kingdom: Plantae
- Division: Bryophyta
- Class: Bryopsida
- Subclass: Bryidae
- Order: Hypnales
- Family: Amblystegiaceae
- Genus: Campylium (Sull.) Mitt.

= Campylium =

Genus of mosses

Campylium is a genus of mosses belonging to the family Amblystegiaceae.

The genus was first described by William Starling Sullivant.

The genus has cosmopolitan distribution.

== Species ==
This species list includes 45 accepted species of Campylium.

- Campylium adscendens (Lindb.) Perss. & Gjaerev.
- Campylium amblystegioides Brotherus, 1929
- Campylium annamense Brotherus & Paris, 1911
- Campylium bambergeri (Schimp.) Hedenäs, Schlesak & D.Quandt
- Campylium calcareum Crundwell & Nyholm, 1962
- Campylium campylophylloides Nishimura, 1985
- Campylium cardotii Brotherus, 1908
- Campylium chrysophyllum J.M.Lange, 1887
- Campylium courtoisii Paris & Brotherus, 1909
- Campylium creperum Brotherus, 1908
- Campylium decipiens (Warnst.) Walsemann
- Campylium elodes (Lindb.) Kindb.
- Campylium fitz-geraldii (Renauld) Kindb.
- Campylium glaucocarpoides Brotherus, 1908
- Campylium gollanii C.Müller ex Vohra, 1970
- Campylium hispidulum Mitten, 1869
- Campylium husnotii (Schimp.) Broth.
- Campylium hygrophilum (Juratzka) Kindberg, 1894
- Campylium hylocomioides Broth.
- Campylium insubricum (Farneti) Dixon
- Campylium lacerulum Brotherus, 1908
- Campylium laxifolium Engelmark & Hedenäs, 1990
- Campylium longicuspis Hedenäs, 1989
- Campylium pachytheca Dixon, 1938
- Campylium polymorphum
- Campylium porphyreticum C.Müller, 1898
- Campylium porphyreticum Müll.Hal.
- Campylium praegracile (Mitt.) Broth.
- Campylium protensum (Brid.) Kindb.
- Campylium pseudochrysophyllum Reimers, 1931
- Campylium pseudocomplexum Brotherus, 1908
- Campylium pulchrum Kanda
- Campylium quisqueyanum W.R.Buck
- Campylium radicale Grout, 1931
- Campylium reichenbachianum Brotherus, 1908
- Campylium rufo-chryseum (Schimp. ex Besch.) Broth.
- Campylium serratifolium (Cardot) Herzog & Nog.
- Campylium squarrosulum Kanda, 1975
- Campylium stellatum (Hedw.) C.E.O.Jensen
- Campylium subdecursivulum Kindberg, 1897
- Campylium tenerum Nishimura, 1985
- Campylium treleasei (Renauld) Broth.
- Campylium trichocladum (Taylor) Broth.
- Campylium uninervium C.Müller, 1896
- Campylium uninervium Müll.Hal.
