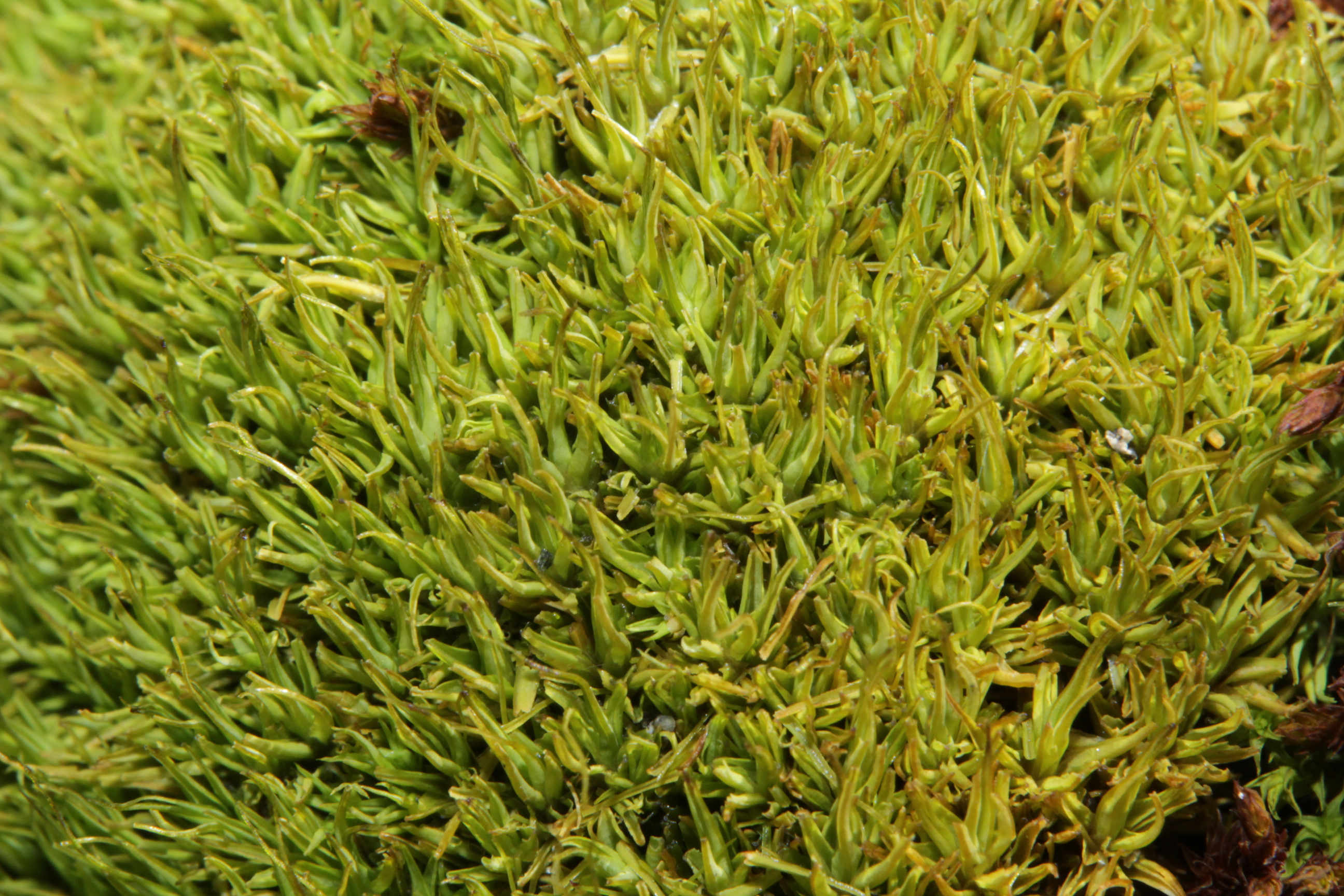

Scientific classification
- Kingdom: Plantae
- Division: Bryophyta
- Class: Bryopsida
- Subclass: Dicranidae
- Order: Pottiales
- Family: Pottiaceae
- Genus: Tortella
- Species: T. fragilis

Binomial name
- Tortella fragilis Limpricht, 1888

= Tortella fragilis =

Species of moss

Tortella fragilis is a species of moss belonging to the family Pottiaceae.

It has cosmopolitan distribution.
