= Campylium elodes =

Scientific classification
- Kingdom: Plantae
- Division: Bryophyta
- Class: Bryopsida
- Subclass: Bryidae
- Order: Hypnales
- Family: Amblystegiaceae
- Genus: Campylium
- Species: C. elodes

Binomial name
- Campylium elodes (Lindb.) Kindb.

Species of moss

Campylium elodes is a species of moss belonging to the family Amblystegiaceae.

Synonyms:

- Amblystegium elodes Lindb.
- Hypnum helodes Spruce ex Fam.
- Stereodon polymorphus Mitt.
