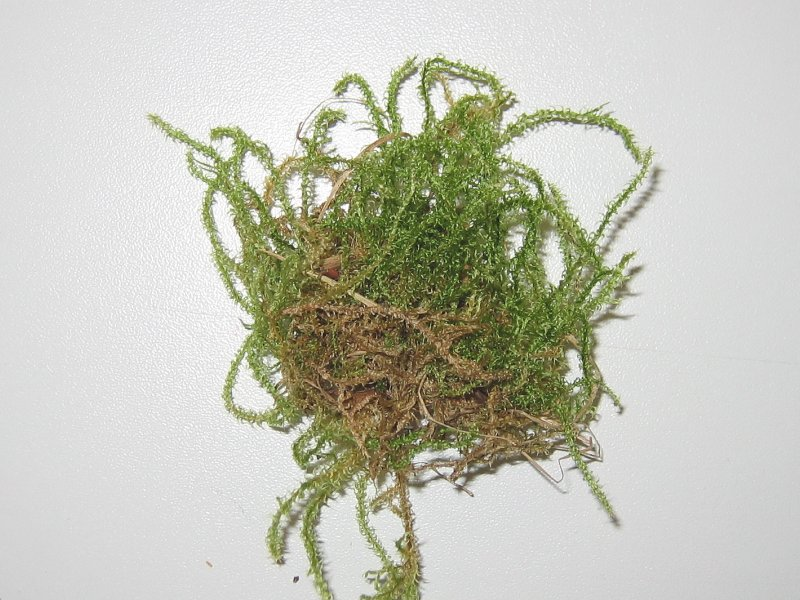

Scientific classification
- Kingdom: Plantae
- Division: Bryophyta
- Class: Bryopsida
- Subclass: Bryidae
- Order: Hypnales
- Family: Amblystegiaceae
- Genus: Campylium
- Species: C. stellatum

Binomial name
- Campylium stellatum (Hedw.) C.E.O. Jensen

= Campylium stellatum =

Species of moss

Campylium stellatum is a species of moss belonging to the family Amblystegiaceae.

It has cosmopolitan distribution.
