= Westmeston =

Village in East Sussex, England

Coordinates: 50.907°N 0.100°W

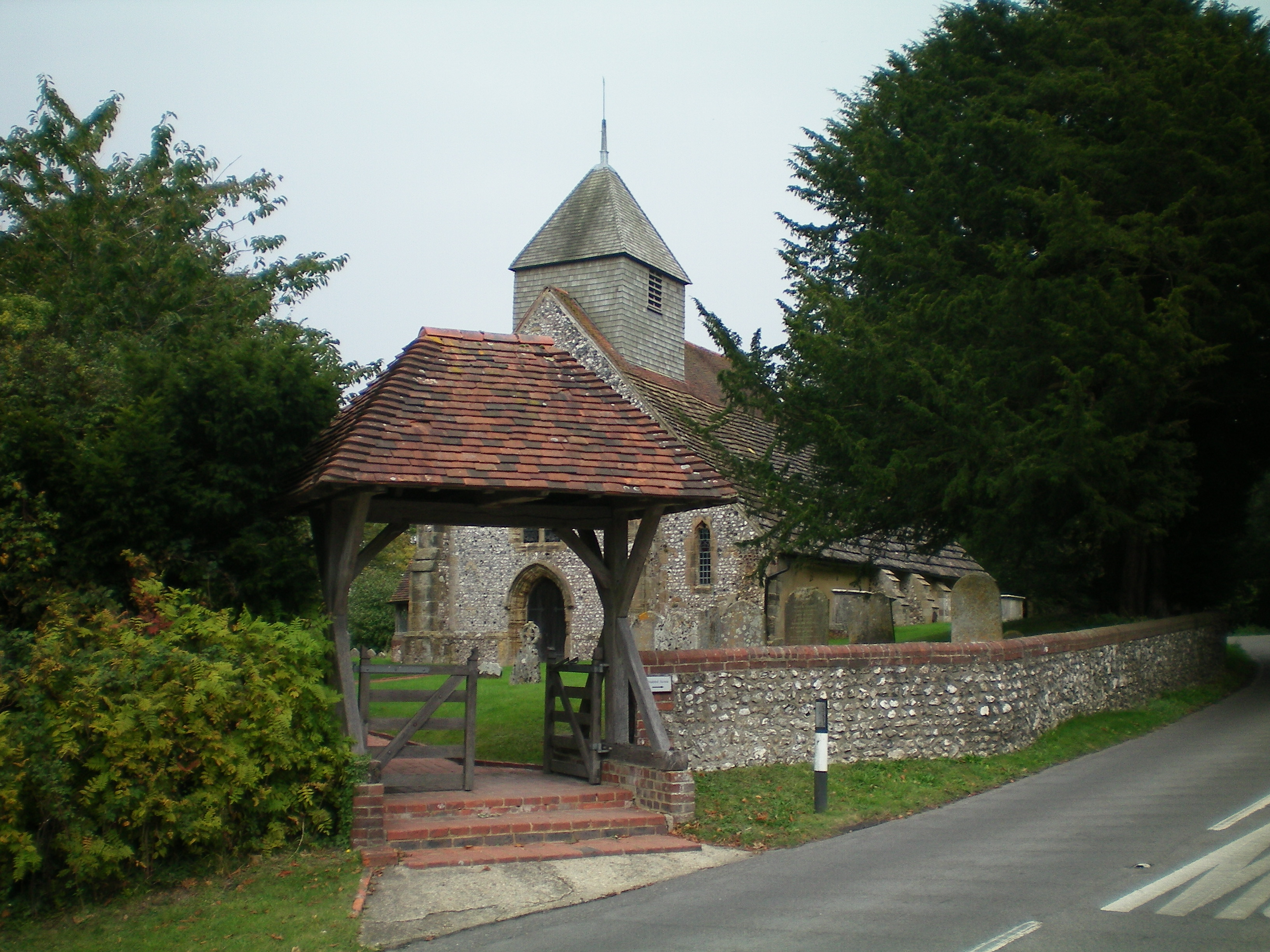
- St Martin's Church

- Location within East Sussex
- Area: 8.5 km^{2} (3.3 sq mi)
- Population: 343 (Parish-2011)
  - Density: 94/sq mi (36/km^{2})
- OS grid reference: TQ338136
  - London: 41 miles (66 km) N
- Civil parish: Westmeston
- District: Lewes
- Shire county: East Sussex
- Region: South East
- Country: England
- Sovereign state: United Kingdom
- Post town: HASSOCKS
- Postcode district: BN6
- Dialling code: 01273
- Police: Sussex
- Fire: East Sussex
- Ambulance: South East Coast
- UK Parliament: Lewes

Westmeston is a village and civil parish in the Lewes District of East Sussex, England heavily dependent in amenities on larger Ditchling to the near-immediate northwest. It is four miles (6 km) south-southeast of Burgess Hill and (10 km) west of Lewes, on the northern slopes of the South Downs.

The name Westmeston comes from Saxon English meaning the most westerly farm, probably from Plumpton.

== History ==
Like much of the Wealden landscape, most of this area was common land. There was Westmeston Common and Middleton Common both enclosed within twelve years of each other in 1672 and 1684. The name Middleton is Saxon and is thought to be so called as it sits between Streat and Westmeston. Middleton drove (TQ 349 169), between The Plantation and Streat Lane Green, was used by villagers to seasonally move their livestock and crops and continues deeper into the weald. It was largely cleared in recent years and is now just a path and fence line with a few surviving bluebells.

== Landmarks ==
Clayton to Offham Escarpment is a Site of Special Scientific Interest, which stretches from Hassocks in the west and passes through many parishes including Westmeston, to Lewes in the east. The site is of biological importance due to its rare chalk grassland habitat along with its woodland and scrub.

A stone marking the resting place of King Ealdwulf of Sussex, circa 765, lies opposite St. Martin's Church at the village centre.

== Notable buildings and areas ==
Notable areas around Westmeston

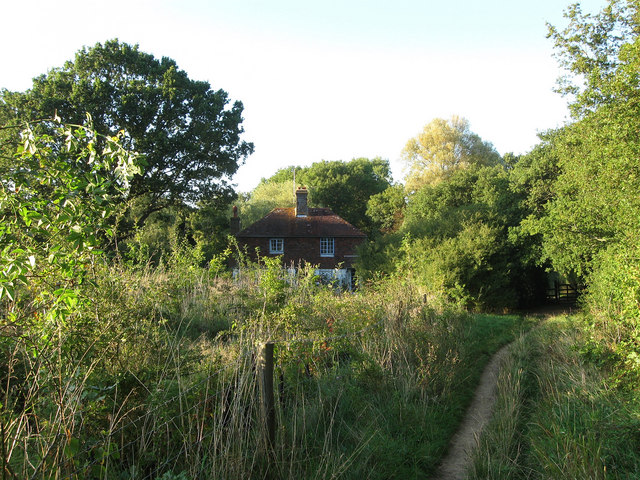
Meadowsweet Cottage - geograph.org.uk - 1471798

Westmeston is a thin parish that stretches from the southern parish of Falmer on the South Downs, down the Clayton to Offham Escarpment and to the Wivelsfield parish in the north. It sits between the Streat parish to the east and Ditchling to the west. The parish has some rich, ancient woodlands and the Bevern Stream, which feeds the River Ouse, starts here.

=== St Martin's Church ===
The parish church (TQ 338 136) is dedicated to St Martin and is of Anglican denomination. Of modest size it dates, with much restoration and addition, from the 12th and 14th centuries. The nave was built by the Normans soon after 1100, and the original north doorway remains. The ecclesiastical parish is today united with Streat and Ditchling. The church had frescoes painted by the Lewes Group which were only uncovered in 1862, although they were not preserved.

=== Gallops Farm ===
Gallops Farm (TQ 351 176) has a part-ancient and timber framed farmhouse and a small, weather boarded barn. It is special as it has retained most of its pattern of little fields and hedgerows and the geese and chickens foraged on the lane side waste until recently.

=== Streams ===
The Bevern Stream starts at Westmeston and flows east into the River Ouse. It is fed by the Westmeston Stream and multiple other small tributaries that arise in the chalk. It still has both brown trout and migratory sea trout, although the latter is rare and threatened.

=== Roman roads ===
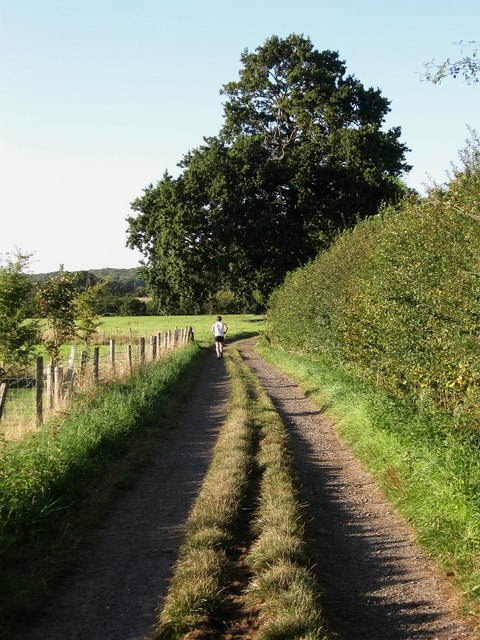
Bridleway near Hayleigh Farm - geograph.org.uk - 1471704

The Roman Sussex Greensand Way passes through the parish and the Westmeston boundary is one of the best places to see it. The raised agger of the road can be seen running right along the north side of an east–west hedgerow (grid reference TQ 343 153). When the field is fallow there can be an obvious vegetation change marking the agger. On top of the agger the vegetation (often feral oats and sow thistle) is taller and below the agger the vegetation (often dock and black grass) is shorter.

Just over the west parish boundary border at Hayleigh Farm, there is a north-south Roman or Romanised Celtic road known as the Middleton Track that passes Middleton Manor and ascends the South Downs escarpment and passes above the Victoria Jubilee Plantation.

=== Woods ===
There are a major cluster of varied and ancient woodlands in this parish on the Weald and Gault Clays.

==== West Wood ====
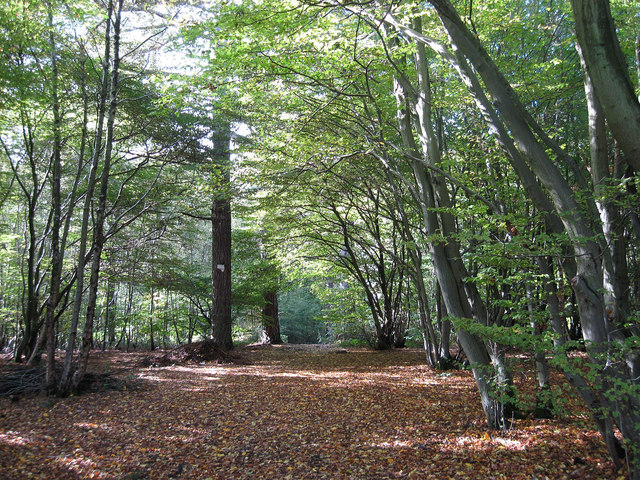
West Wood - geograph.org.uk - 1529868

West Wood (TQ 345 194) sits on the Weald Clay and is at the northern end of Westmeston parish on the site of Westmeston Common. The wood is largely hornbeam coppice and oak, but it also has maple, silver birch, wild cherry and midland thorn, all of which grow over the spring anemones and bluebells. It lies next to Bushycommon Wood, Purchase Wood (just over the Ditchling boundary) and One Hundred Acre (in the Chailey parish). It is a big enough block to get delightfully lost in.

It is likely to have been consolidated as woodland after the common's enclosure in 1672. There are large shallow pits and roughly north–south braided tracks on the northern steep slope. This may be evidence of ancient people mining for the ironstone ore and/or clay pits for the nearby brickworks. There is a little Kiln Wood just across Hundred Acre Lane to the east (TQ 352 196), which supports this theory.

The wide green lane, with a braided track, that runs along its western boundary, separates it from Purchase Wood is one of the most varied features of the wood. There are wild service trees in both woods in that area. Then lane passes southwards by bank and shaw, fields and cottages, and over a little stream before crossing Middleton Common Lane to lovely Blackbrook Wood (TQ 343 174).

==== Bushycommon Wood ====
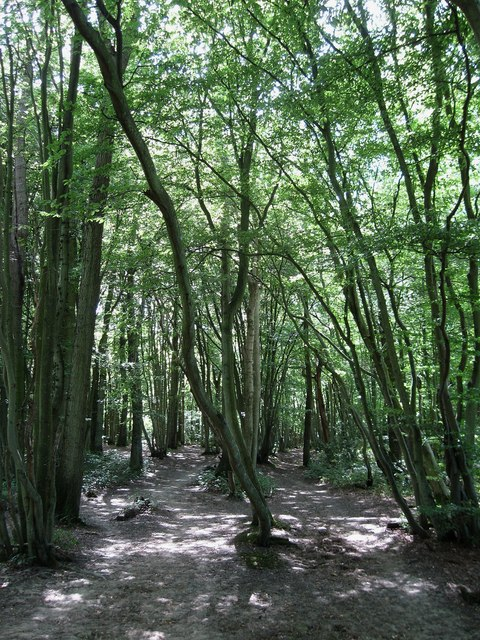
Bushycommon Wood - geograph.org.uk - 1456462

Bushycommon Wood (TQ 344 188) is at the southern end of the West Wood block, separated by a woodbank (a medieval earth bank with exterior ditch). This area feels far more remote and in spring the bluebells form a continuous carpet, but there are few paths. There is a narrow field along the southern boundary of the wood (TQ 345 186), which closely coincides with a thin sandstone band, and this may have provided enough of an incentive to assart and plough that strip.

==== Blackbrook Wood ====
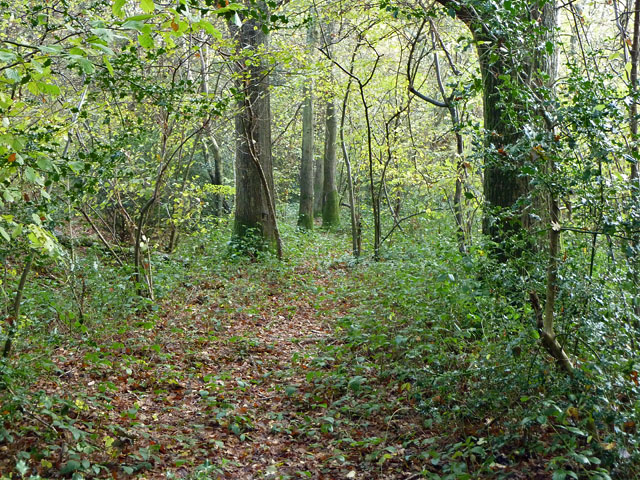
In Blackbrook Wood (just) - geograph.org.uk - 2166863

Blackbrook Wood's geology, relief and history are nuanced enough to give it considerable internal variety. Most of the wood has youngish oak standards over both hazel and abundant hornbeam. There are areas which have been recently coppiced, areas long over-stood, dry well-drained parts, soggy parts, and a block of planted conifers to the south west. There are two bands of Sussex marble/winklestone outcrop in wandering lines through the middle of the wood (where the ground rises to a small hill) and across the south east corner. This may partially explain the limey flora of some parts. There have been at least nine ancient woodland indictor species been recorded here, including butterfly orchids. Native Lily of the Valley, a plant of dry woods, was still present in these woods until the 1930s. The best area now may be in the south east, where ash, oak, birch, gean, maple and hazel are intermingled. The Plantation and Oldhouse Copse to the east (TQ 346 171) are rich and varied.

==== Sedlow Wood ====
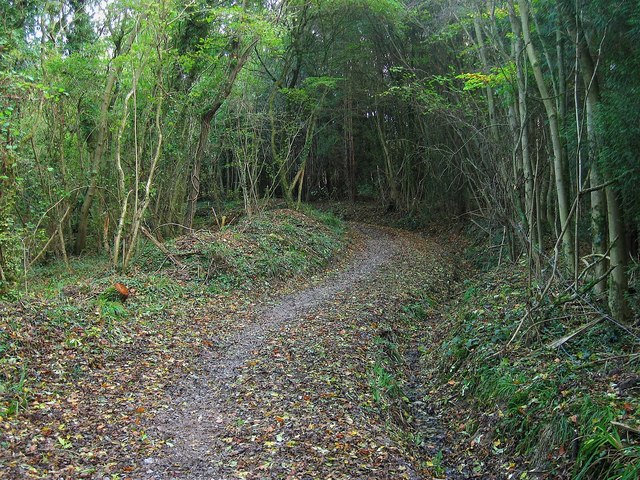
Wapple Way, Sedlow Wood - geograph.org.uk - 1573381

Sedlow Wood (TQ 342 146) It is a half mile north of Westmeston churchand is a tangled, species-rich and wild ash wood that grows on the Gault Clay of the area. In the 17th century much of it was cleared with Hayleigh Park when the Westmeston Common was enclosed.

=== Scarp and downland ===
The south of the parish rises to the top of the Downs and the slope forms part of Clayton to Offham Escarpment, which is a Site of Special Scientific Interest.

==== High Park Farm ====
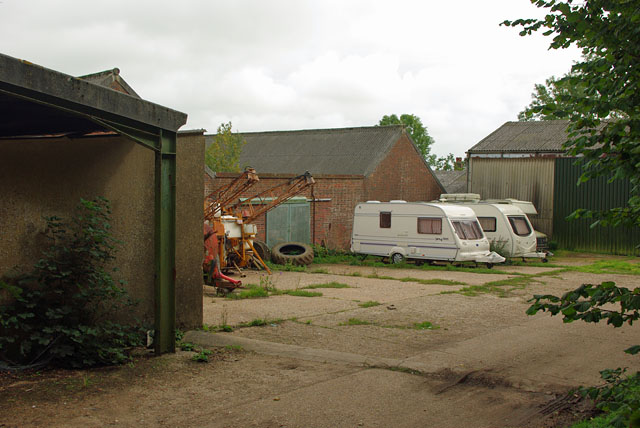
A corner of High Park Farm - geograph.org.uk - 2065146

High Park Farm (TQ 335 112) is mixed arable and pasture. The horse paddocks south east of the farmstead, (c. TQ 334 113), have several prehistoric lynchets, which were a feature of ancient field systems, that make giant steps down the valley. On the steepest part you can find harebell, quaking grass and restharrow below the scrub, and chalk grassland butterflies such as common blue can be seen here. Like Streathill Farm, High Park was carved out of the ancient sheep pastures in the mid-19th century corn boom. Now, two thirds of High Park has returned to pasture.

High Park's farmstead sit on the border of Westmeston parish and next to High Park Corner (TQ 329 116), which is actually in the neighbouring Ditchling parish. Until the second world war, the Corner was level, common ground and a favourite site for gypsy encampments. Unfortunately, there are accounts of regular visits from farmers and other thugs using violence to evict the gypsies, who must have included many small children, often organised by the Ditchling Constable. The Corner is now used for public car parking for walking or mountain biking either east into High Park Wood or west towards North Bottom.

==== Westmeston and Middleton Bostal, chalkpit and slopes ====
The Westmeston bostal (locally, a road up a hill) rises up the bank from Westmeston Farm. The old Middleton bostal (TQ 343 130), which comes from the ridge, used to connect at its top (TQ 338 130), but it has lost its public path status. The two paths divide a large cluster of round barrows, (TQ 339 128), which are easier to make out on the western side than the eastern side. In Spring, the Westmeston bostal is rich with wildflower and harbours a huge old ash pollard (TQ 340 130), which many seek out to admire. There are old limekilns in Westmeston chalkpit and the chalkpit south of The Gote, (TQ 348 132). The slopes have well-formed sheep terracettes (ridges).

==== Home and Western Brow ====
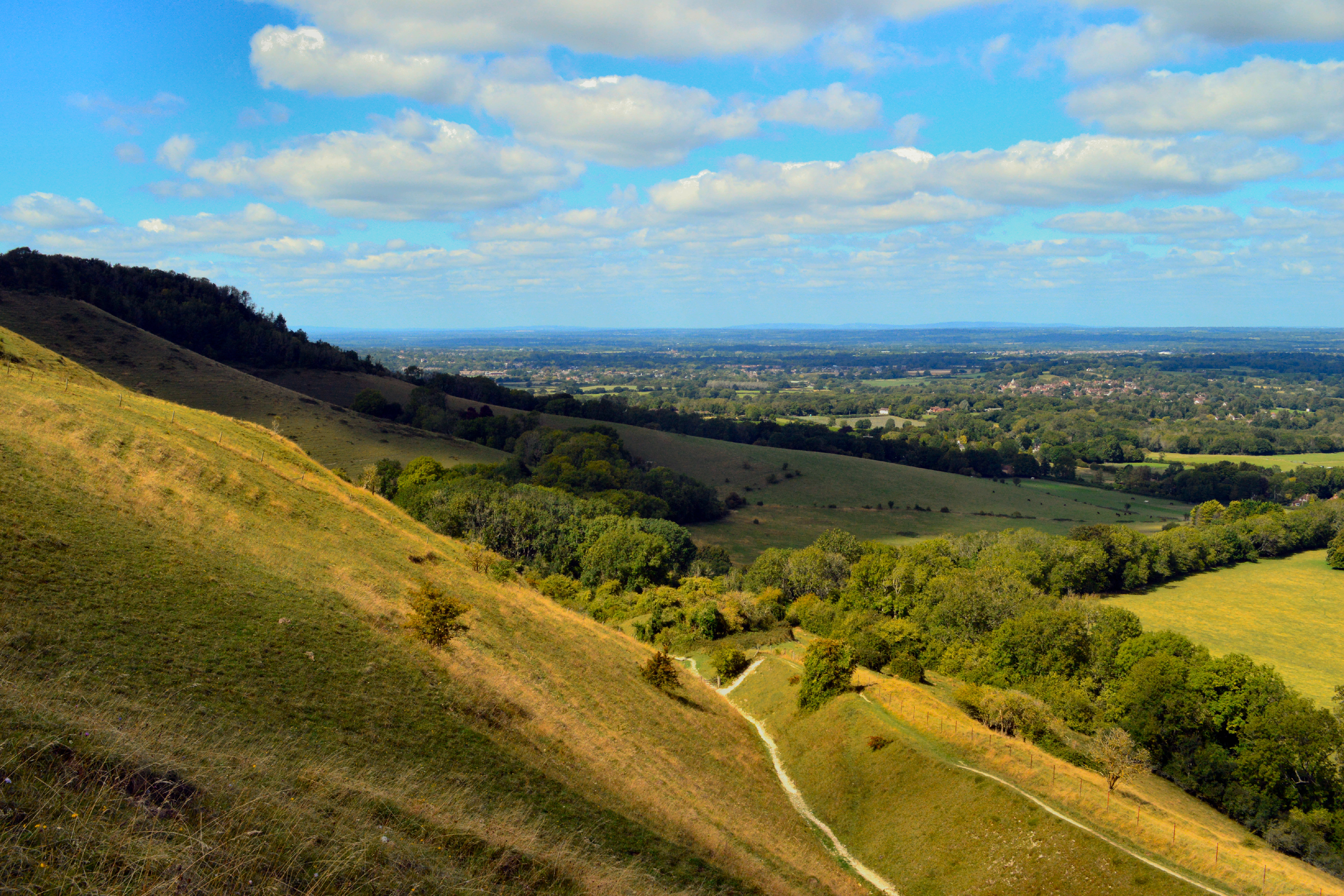
View from Westmeston Bostall footpath, Western Brow

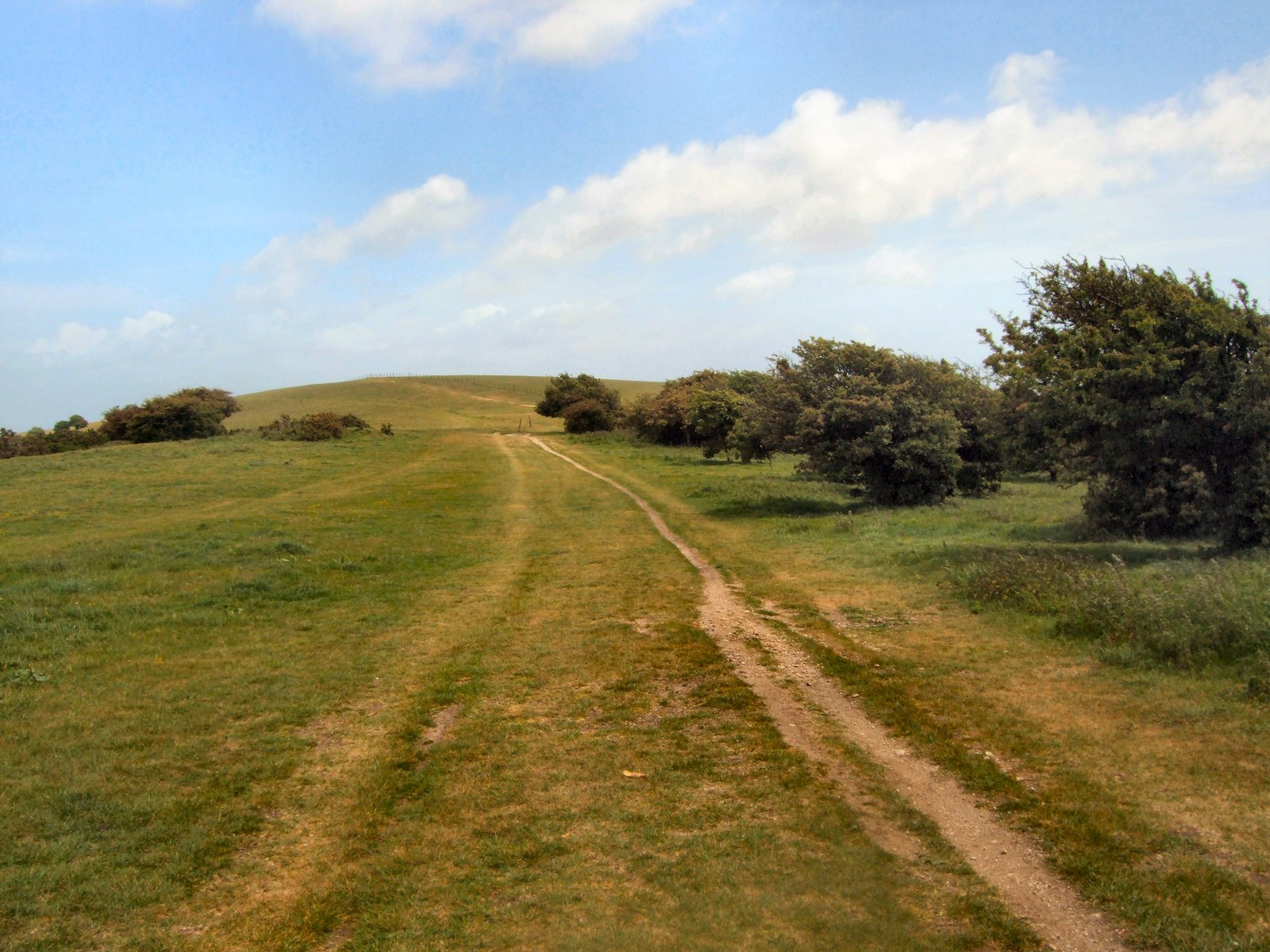
Path near Home Brow - geograph.org.uk - 2421515

Home and Western Brow lie east of Ditchling Beacon where the scarp brow gently decreases in height and opens up. From here there are easterly views of the Lewes brooks, the chalk sea cliffs, and the east Sussex Weald. David Bangs, field naturalist, describes the scarp slope north of Home Brow and Western Brow as cowslip heaven, "I have never in my life seen such astonishing displays of cowslips as I have seen there. The hillside can be yellow with them in May-time. There are lovely displays, too, of early purple orchis and, in August, devil's-bit. There was a large heath snail population where a spur turned to face south, but their numbers had drastically dwindled when I last looked".

==== Big Bottom ====
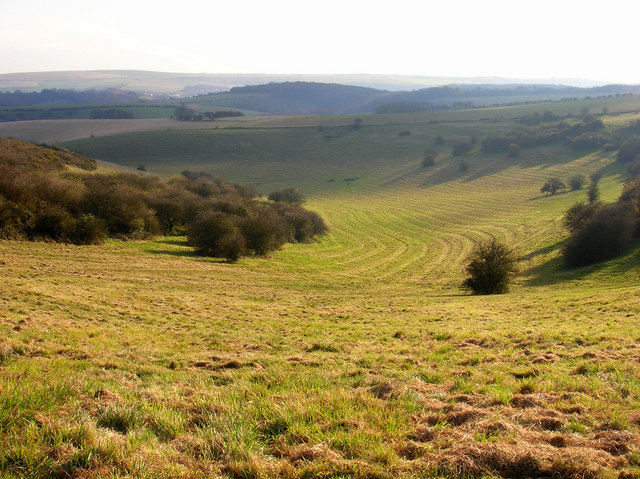
Big Bottom - geograph.org.uk - 614133

Big Bottom is one of the few Downland valleys within the Brighton area with good south facing slopes. It is part of High Park Farm (a farm leased from Brighton Council since 1927), and was off-limits until the statutory Right to Roam act was passed in 2000. It is open to the thousands of walkers on the South Downs Way which is just over the fence. The Council have created a welcome corridor of publicly accessible pastures between Big Bottom and Stanmer Park.

It has a fringe of gorse and a number of its slopes are rich with Downland flowers. Its seems a favourite spot for brown hare, but much has been lost to thorn scrub as it is under-grazed. The Downland chalk and the heat from the sun could make the south-facing slopes good for butterflies such as the rare adonis blue and silver-studded blue and indeed fritillaries and adonis were once plentiful in the area, but they are not seen regularly there now.

== Governance ==
Westmeston is covered by the electoral ward called Ditchling and Westmeston.

Westmeston lies within the Chailey ward for the East Sussex County Council tier of government. The ward also includes Chailey itself, Ditchling, East Chiltington, Newick, St John Without, Streat, Plumpton and Wivelsfield.

Westmeston is represented in the UK Parliament by the Lewes constituency. The current serving MP is the Liberal Democrat James MacCleary who won the seat in the 2024 general election.

== Notable people ==
- Raymond Briggs, creator and illustrator of the children's picture book The Snowman (which has no words, and was later made into an animated film), lived in Westmeston.
