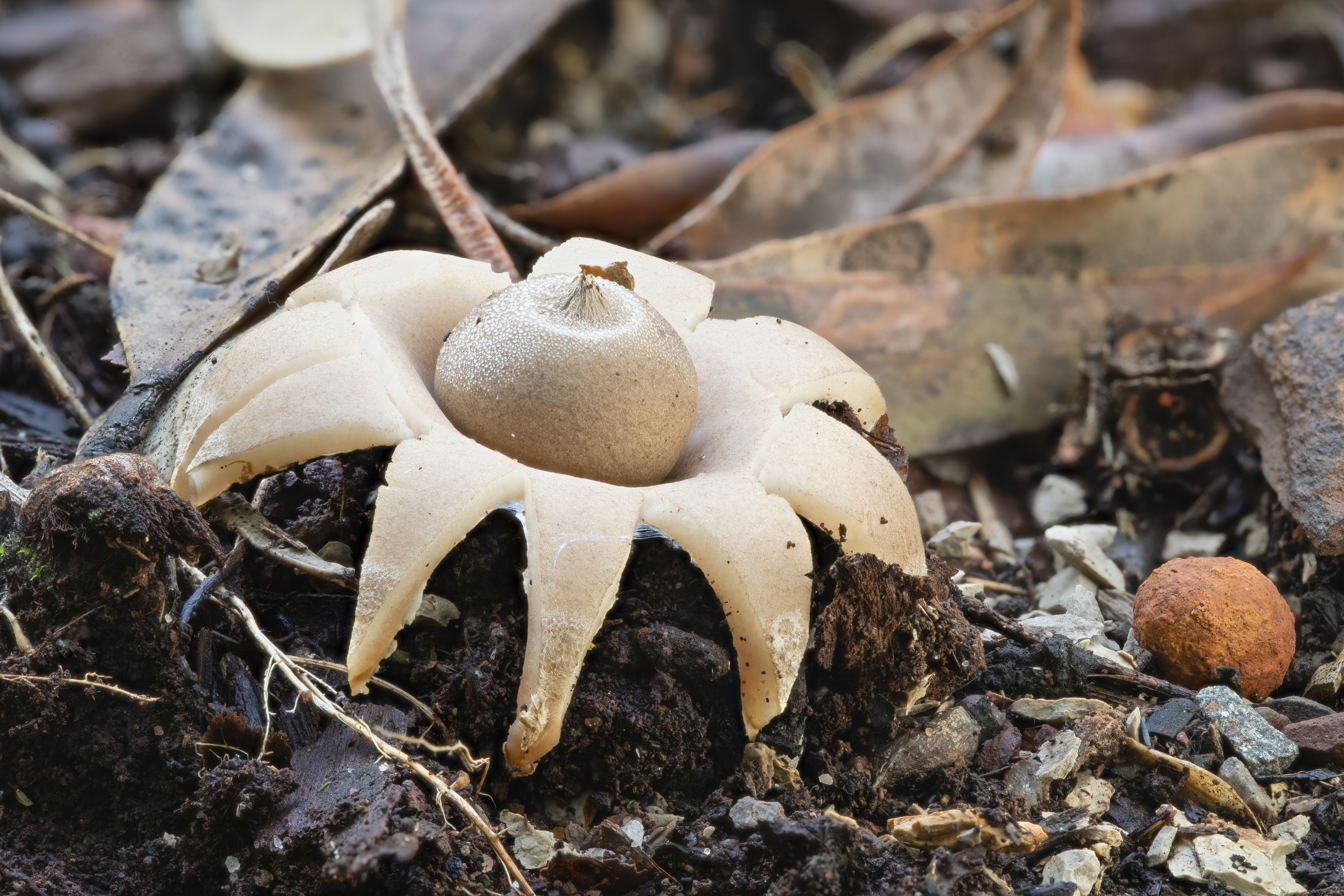

Scientific classification
- Kingdom: Fungi
- Division: Basidiomycota
- Class: Agaricomycetes
- Order: Geastrales
- Family: Geastraceae
- Genus: Geastrum
- Species: G. triplex

Binomial name
- Geastrum triplex Jungh.

Synonyms
- Geastrum indicum (Klotzsch) Rauschert; Geastrum michelianum W.G. Sm. Geastrum tunicatus var. michelianus (W.G. Sm.) Sacc.

= Geastrum triplex =

Species of fungus in the family Geastraceae

Geastrum triplex
- Mycological characteristics
- Glebal hymenium
- No distinct cap
- Hymenium attachment is not applicable
- Lacks a stipe
- Spore print is brown
- Ecology is saprotrophic
- Edibility is inedible

Geastrum triplex is a species of fungus commonly known as the collared earthstar, the saucered earthstar, or the triple earthstar—and less commonly by the alternative species name Geastrum indicum. It is the largest member of the genus Geastrum (or earthstar fungi) and expanded mature specimens can reach up to 11.5 centimeters (4 1/2 in) across.

Immature fruit bodies are spherical—somewhat resembling puffballs with pointed beaks—and are partially or completely buried in the ground. As the fungus matures, the outer layer of tissue (the exoperidium) splits into four to eight pointed segments that spread outwards and downwards, lifting and exposing the spherical inner spore sac. The spore sac contains the gleba, a mass of spores and fertile mycelial tissue that when young is white and firm, but ages to become brown and powdery. Often, a layer of the exoperidium splits around the perimeter of the spore sac so that it appears to rest in a collar or saucer. Atop the spore sac is a small pointed beak, the peristome, which has a small hole from which spores may be released.

Found in the detritus and leaf litter of hardwood forests, the species is widespread and can be found in Eurasia, Australasia, and the Americas. It is used in the traditional medicines of native North America and China. Fruit bodies have been analyzed chemically to determine their lipid content, and various chemical derivatives of the fungal sterol ergosterol have been identified.

== Taxonomy ==
The species was first described scientifically by German botanist Franz Wilhelm Junghuhn, as Geaster triplex in 1840. The earlier genus name Geaster, introduced by Italian botanist Pier Antonio Micheli in 1727 in Nova Plantarum Genera, is considered an orthographical variant of Geastrum. Junghuhn, who was living in Indonesia and extensively surveyed its fungal flora, discovered the type specimen on Mount Panggerangi on the island Java, at an elevation between 910 to 1,520 metres (3,000 to 5,000 ft). Today, the type specimen is kept at the National Herbarium of the Netherlands in Leiden. The morphological feature used by Junghuhn to differentiate G. triplex from other similar earthstars was the collar-like structure of the inner layer of the exoperidium. American mycologist Curtis Gates Lloyd would later erroneously suggest that the species was a "giant form" of G. saccatum.

Several authors have regarded Geastrum indicum as the correct name for G. triplex. This is because G. indicum—a species described by Johann Friedrich Klotzsch in 1832 as Cycloderma indicum and then moved to Geastrum by Stephan Rauschert in 1959—may be the same species as G. triplex. If it is in fact the same species, the first published name (i.e., G. indicum) has nomenclatorial priority according to the rules of the International Code of Botanical Nomenclature. More recently, several authors argue that G. indicum should be rejected as a nomen dubium and G. triplex maintained as the correct name for the species.

Stellan Sunhede's 1989 monograph of European species of Geastrum follows V. J. Staněk's concept for the infrageneric (below the level of genus) placement of Geastrum, and places G. triplex with species that do not incorporate and encrust forest debris (section Basimyceliata). G. triplex is further categorized in subsection Laevistomata, which includes species with a fibrillose peristome—that is, made of parallel, thin, thread-like filaments. Within subsection Laevistomata it is in stirps Triplex, due to its delimited (with a distinct restricting edge) or irregularly torn peristome.

The specific epithet triplex means "threefold" and refers to the three-layered peridium. Geastrum triplex has acquired several vernacular names, including the collared earthstar, the saucered earthstar, and the triple earthstar.

== Description ==
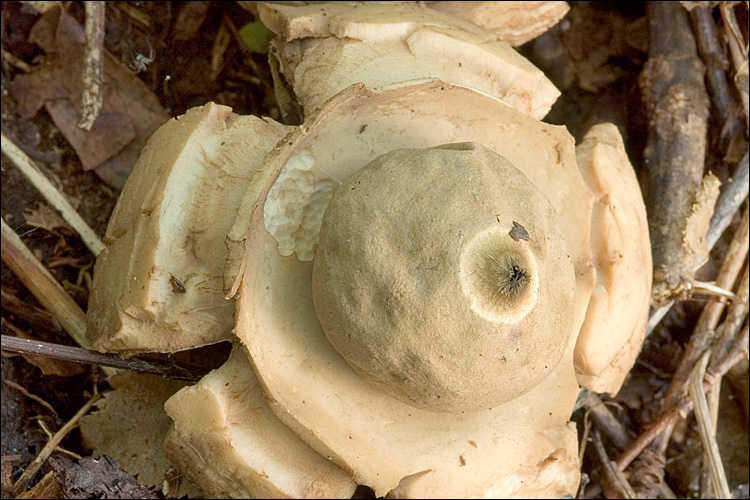
The exoperidium splits to form a saucerlike platform that holds the endoperidium.

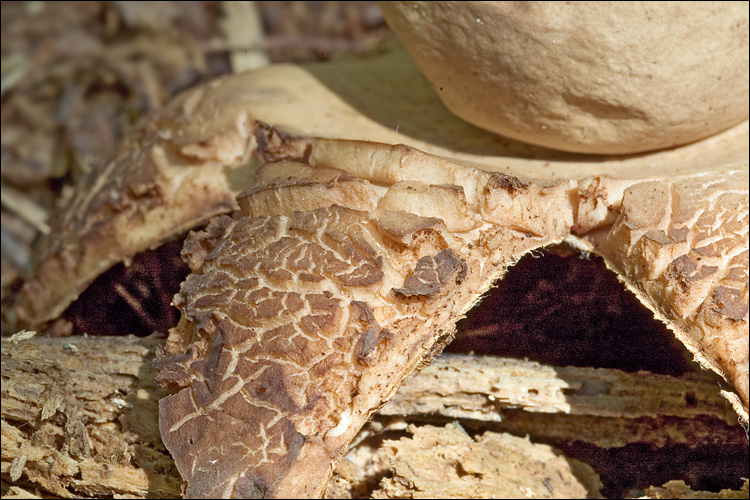
The upper surface of the rays may be divided into sections by cracks and fissures.

Like all mushrooms, the fruit body of G. triplex is the visible part of a larger organism. Hidden from sight are masses of nearly invisible fungal threads called mycelium, which form the active feeding and growing structures of the fungus. The fruit body—created when environmental conditions such as temperature, moisture, and nutrient availability are optimal—is designed to produce and disseminate spores. Geastrum triplex has the largest fruit body of the earthstar mushrooms. The immature fruit body is typically 1 to 5 cm (1/2 to 2 in) in diameter and up to 8 to 10 cm (3 1/4 to 4 in) broad or exceptionally 11.5 cm with the rays spread out.

The fruit body is composed of a roughly spherical to egg-shaped structure, the endoperidium, topped by an opening, the ostiole, covered by fragments of tissue that form a small pointed beak (a peristome). The endoperidium typically lacks any sort of stem (being sessile); it is grayish brown to "wood brown" when young but light yellow-brown in dried, unopened specimens. The outer tissue layer, the exoperidium, develops splits which radiate from the apex and form between four and eight rays that separate from the endoperidium. The latter's thin and papery envelope surrounds a mass of spores and fertile tissue known as the gleba. The central part of the gleba contains a pseudocolumella (a columella not attached to the stalk) that is typically cylindrical or club-shaped and extends up from the base; its value for identification is limited due to the variability in persistence, size, structure and shape within the genus.

The exoperidium's rays are 2 to 4 cm (3/4 to 1 1/2 in) long and up to 4 mm (3/16 in) thick. The outer surface of the rays (the lower surface, after expansion) and unopened specimens have a rough texture. In several Geastrum species, dirt and debris adhere to the underside; this is not the case in G. triplex. The inner fleshy layers (upper surface) of these rays are near "wood brown" in color when dried, and have a layer of surface tissue that cracks into patches. There is a great deal of variation, however, to the extent in which the upper surface tissue of the rays crack: this tissue layer may also remain closely attached as a sheet over the unsegmented part of the outer wall with the part adhering to the rays variously cracked and sometimes finally peeling off in places.

In G. triplex, the bases of the rays usually break around the perimeter of the endoperidium to form a saucerlike platform or receptacle in which the endoperidium rests. However, not all specimens form this receptacle, leading to possible confusion with other Geastrum species. Curtis Gates Lloyd claimed that in tropical regions, with an abundance of high temperatures and humidity, the fungus expands rapidly, which is more conducive to the fleshy layer breaking away to form a receptacle; in more temperate areas this effect would not be as pronounced and "usually does not occur at all".

The endoperidium is 1 to 3 cm (3/8 to 1 1/8 in) in diameter by 0.9 to 2 cm (3/8 to 3/4 in) high, sessile, and a dull grayish brown. The peristome is made of radially arranged fibrils that clump together at the apex in groups of unequal length to form an opening that appears jagged or torn. The circular area bordering the peristome is a paler color.

=== Microscopic characteristics ===
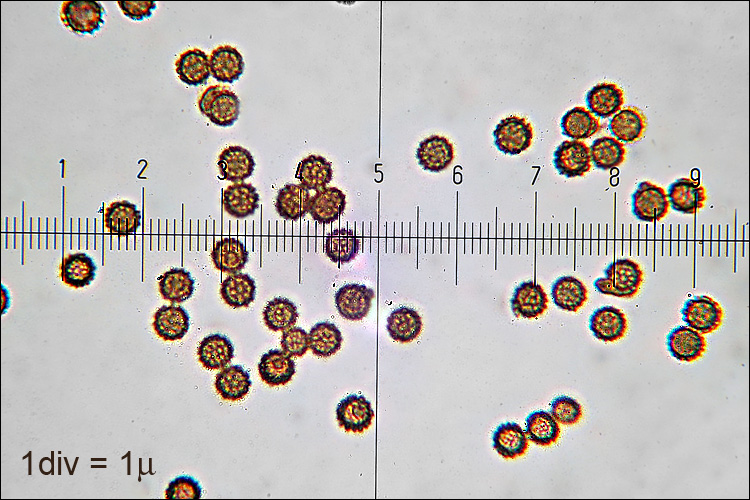
The basidiospores are spherical, 3.5–4.5 μm wide, and covered with warts.

The spore sac contains the gleba, which is composed of a pseudocolumella, unbranched threads (the capillitium), the spore-bearing cells (basidia) and the spores themselves; all of these microscopic elements have certain characteristic features that help distinguish G. triplex from other superficially similar earthstars. The spores are thought to be dispersed by the wind sucking them out when it blows over the hole, or when falling raindrops hit the flexible endoperidium, creating a puff of air that forces the spores through the ostiole.

The spores are spherical, and 3.5–4.5 μm in diameter. They are covered with short narrow abruptly terminating projections of a translucent (hyaline) substance, which turn a pale cinnamon brown in potassium hydroxide, and a dark dull brown (nearly sepia) when stained with iodine. The capillitium is made of what appears to be encrusted cylindrical filaments 3–6 μm in diameter, of a color varying from hyaline to dull yellowish brown in potassium hydroxide, and yellowish in iodine; its walls are thickened to the point where the interior (lumen) appears as only a line. Either two or four spores are attached to the basidia, and the sterigmata (extensions of the basidia that attach the spores) are long, up to 20 μm. Geastrum triplex does not have cystidia.

=== Similar species ===
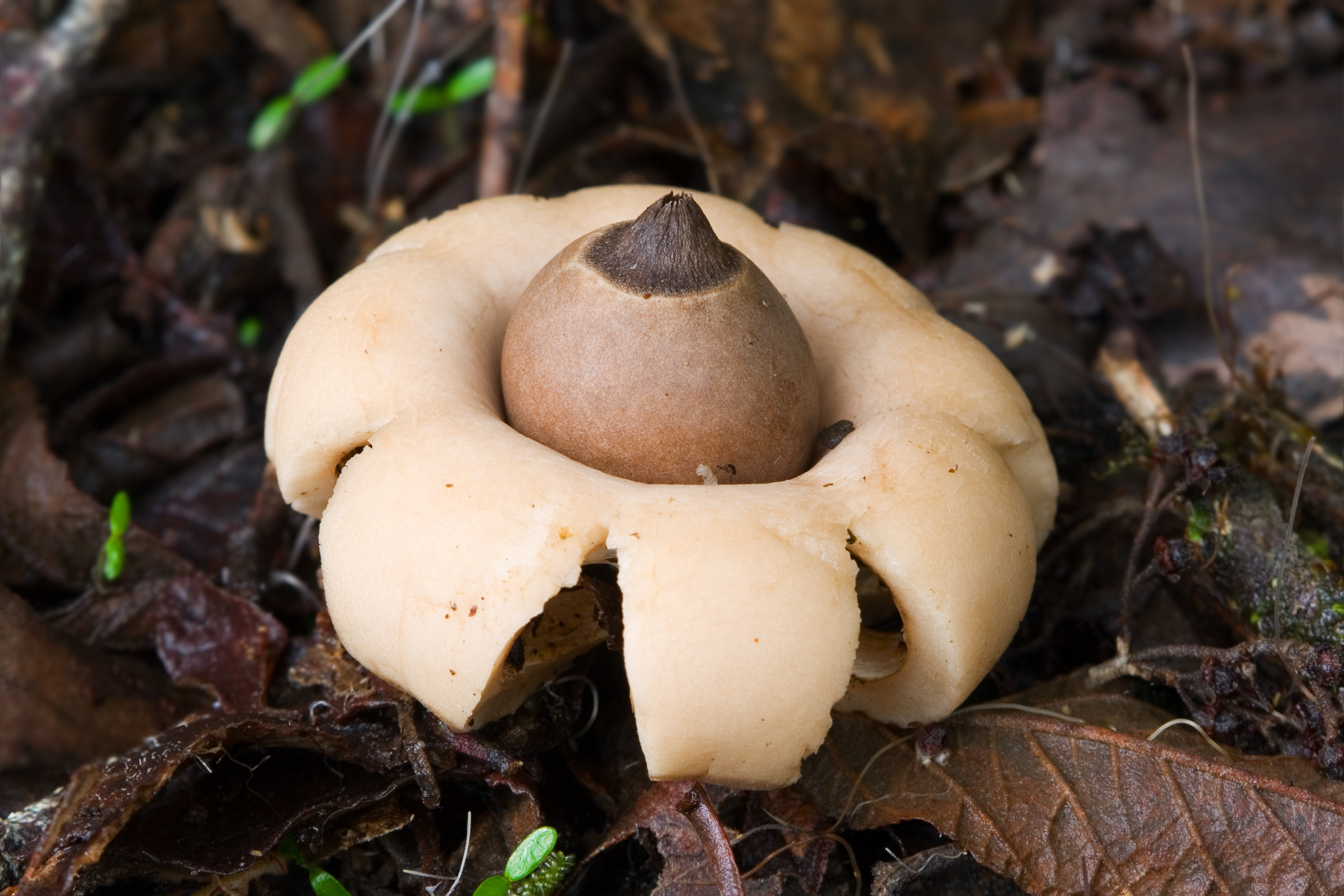
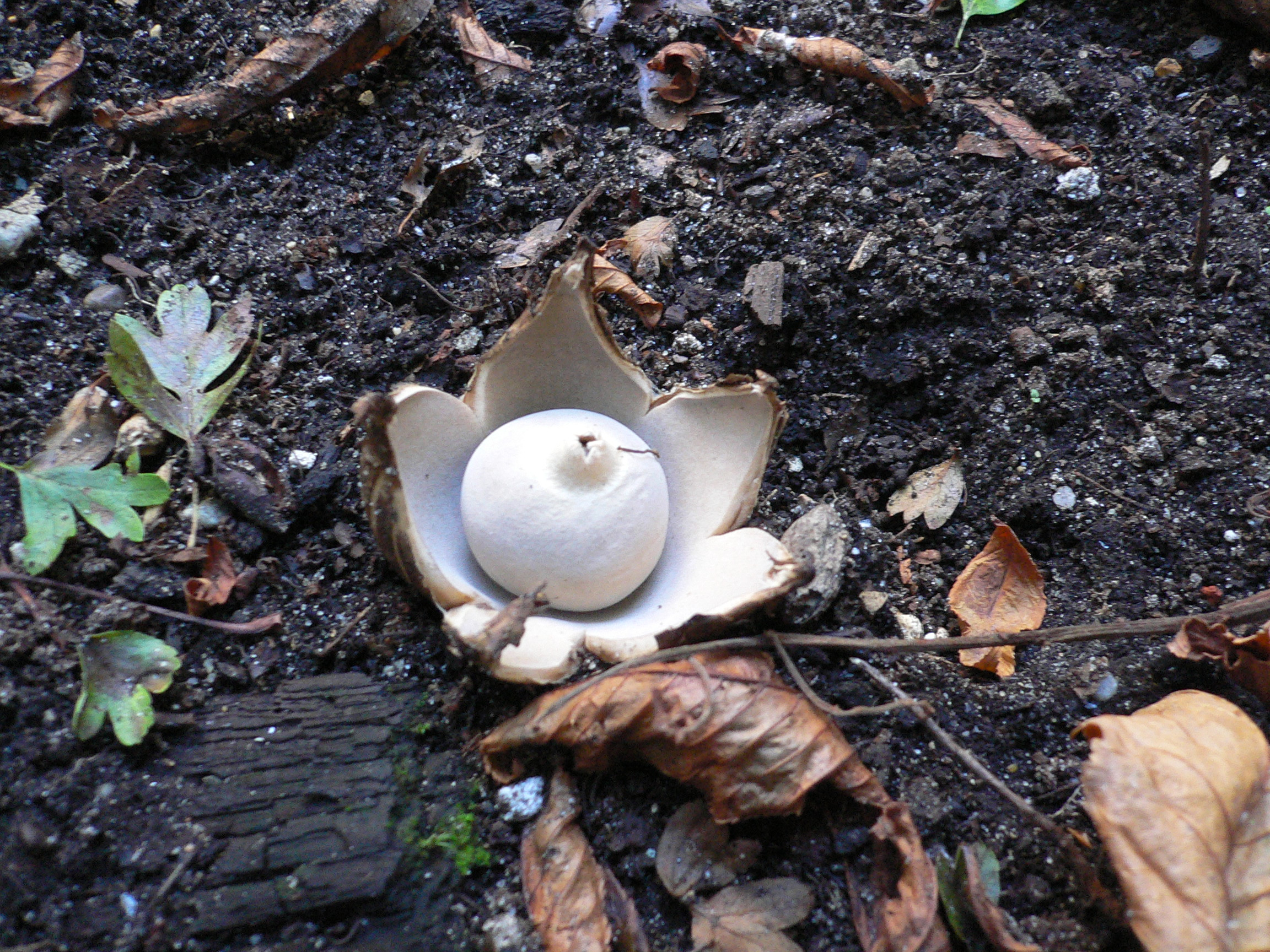
G. saccatum (left) and G. fimbriatum (right) are distinguished from G. triplex by color, the lack of a "collar", and smaller size.

Geastrum triplex may be confused with G. saccatum or G. fimbriatum, as the rays do not always crack around the perimeter to form a bowl under the spore case. However, it is larger than either of these species. The combination of characteristics which distinguish G. triplex from other earthstars include the lack of debris adhering to the outer surfaces, the saucer-like base in which the spore case is seated, the relatively large size, the fibrillose peristome and the paler area surrounding the peristome separating it from the rest of the endoperidium. Unlike some other Geastrum species, the rays of G. triplex are not hygroscopic: they do not open and close in response to changes in humidity.

== Habitat and distribution ==
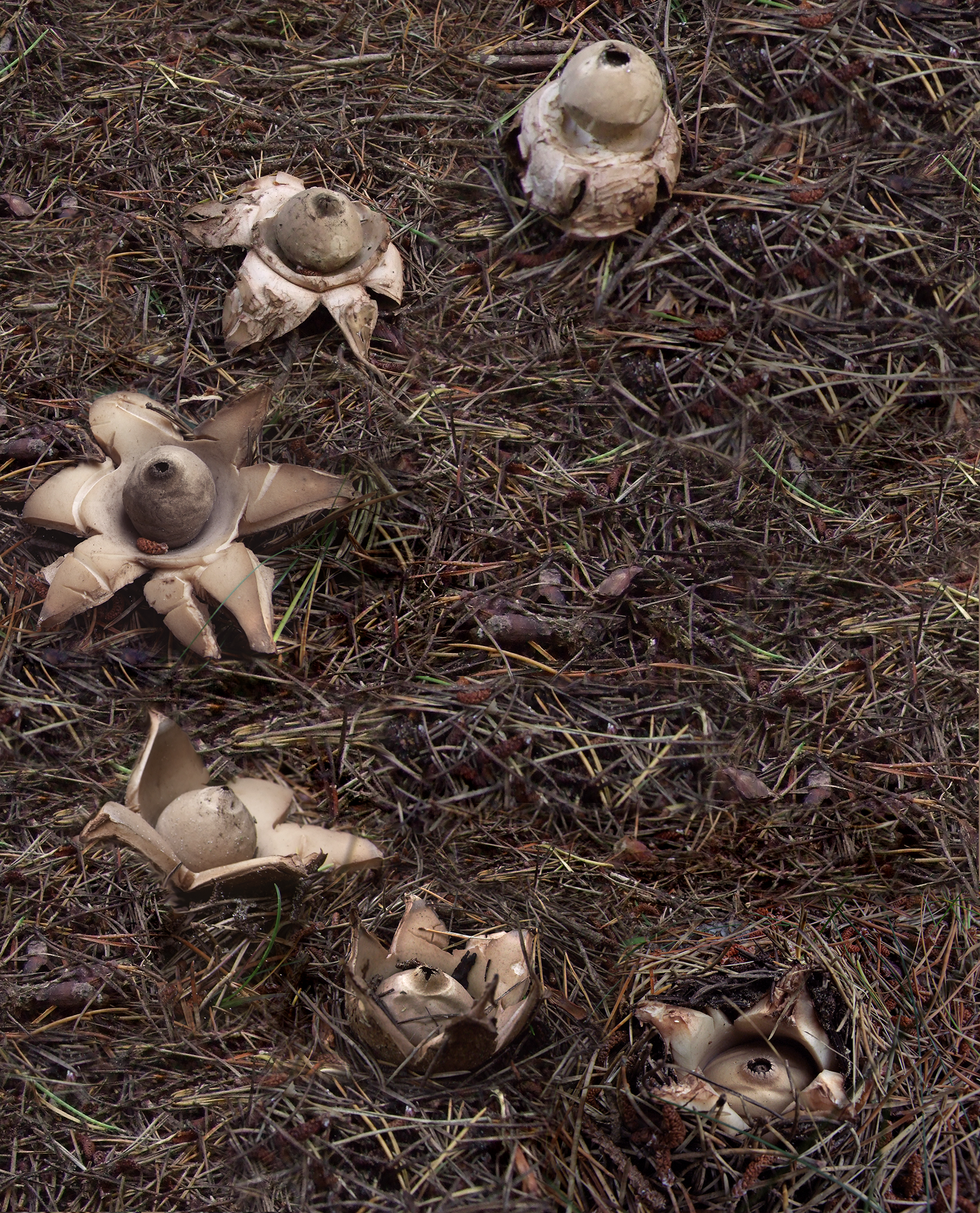
Stages of fruit body emergence

Geastrum triplex is a saprobic fungus: it derives nutrients from decomposing organic matter. The fruit bodies are usually found growing singly or more commonly in groups in hardwood forests where much humus has accumulated; in Mexico, they have been collected in tropical deciduous forest. Fruit bodies are often found around well-rotted tree stumps; they are initially almost buried in the loose duff, but emerge during maturity as the downward curling of the rays exposes the spore sac. Old fruit bodies are persistent, and may survive the winter to be found the following spring or summer. A Dutch study reported a propensity for G. triplex to grow on soil made calcium-rich from washed-out chalk of crushed shells on bicycling paths. It is described as common in North America and Europe. One author states it is commonly found under beech trees.

Geastrum triplex has a widespread distribution, and has been collected in Asia (China, Korea Iran, and Turkey), Australia, Europe (Belgium, Czech Republic, Sweden, and the Canary Islands), and Africa (Congo, South Africa). In North America, its range extends north to Canada and south to Mexico, including the whole continental United States and Hawaii. In Central and South America the fungus has been reported from Panama, Trinidad and Tobago, Argentina, Brazil, and Chile.

== Uses ==
=== Edibility ===
Although the fruit bodies are nonpoisonous, they are tough and fibrous, and considered of "no alimentary interest". Mycologist David Arora says that they are reputed to be edible when immature—when the gleba is still white and firm—but adds that they are rarely found in this form.

=== In traditional medicine ===
Earthstars were used medicinally by the indigenous peoples of the Americas. The Blackfoot called them ka-ka-toos, meaning "fallen stars", and according to legend, they were an indication of supernatural events. The Cherokee put fruit bodies on the navels of babies after childbirth until the withered umbilical cord fell off, "both as a prophylactic and a therapeutic measure". In traditional Chinese medicine, G. triplex is used to reduce inflammation in the respiratory tract, and to stanch bleeding and reduce swelling.

=== Chemistry ===
The fruit bodies of G. triplex have been chemically analyzed and shown to contain a number of bioactive compounds, including fungal sterols such as ergosta-4,6,8,(14),22-tetraen-3-one,5,6-dihydroergosterol, ergosterol, and peroxyergosterol. The fungus also contains various fatty acids, notably myristic, palmitic, stearic, oleic, alpha-linolenic, and linoleic acid.
