= British wildwood =

Natural landscape of post-ice age Britain

British wildwood, or simply the wildwood, is the natural forested landscape that developed across much of prehistoric Britain after the Last Glacial Period. It existed for several millennia as the main climax community in Britain given the relatively warm and moist post-glacial climate and had not yet been destroyed or modified by human intervention. From the start of the Neolithic, the wildwood gradually gave way to grasslands (open plains and fields) as human populations grew and people began to significantly shape and exploit the land to their advantage.

The wildwood concept has been popularised in particular by ecologist and countryside historian Oliver Rackham in his various works

Most of the modern woodlands that remain in England are descended from the original wildwood, but are now maintained in a semi-natural state through management, rotational felling, and exploitation for products such as timber. Where these woodlands have remained ecologically continuous since at least 1600, they are known as ancient woodland. True wildwood is believed to no longer exist in the UK.

== History and development of the wildwood ==
=== Beginnings ===
The history of British wildwood begins during the Holocene around 11,000 – 8,000 BC, at the end of the Weichselian glaciation. Although forests existed in Britain for millions of years, earlier forest communities were eradicated by glaciations during previous ice ages.

This last glacial retreat was followed by a period of prolonged climatic moderation, which eventually gave rise to forests in the form that is familiar to most people of Britain today. As the ice melted, the warming, postglacial climate favoured the growth of trees that had previously been restricted much further south in Europe. Eastern Britain was still connected to the European continent at this time, with dry land extending across the English Channel, Irish Sea, and North Sea. This meant that plants and animals could spread easily across the land into Britain to establish native populations in the more hospitable climate.

As there are no written records or even folk legends of what the prehistoric wilderness of Britain might have looked like, analyses of pollen and seeds preserved in stratified mineral deposits as well as radiocarbon dating of macrofossils have been necessary to try and reconstruct the ecology and floristic composition of these forests.

=== The first wildwood ===
Trees were relatively slow to arrive in Britain. This may be because of the relatively few boreal species such as birch, aspen and Scots pine that could persist north of the Alps. Britain was also distant from the biggest concentrations of tree populations in Europe.

During the Preboreal, birch (Betula pubescens and B. pendula) was one of the first trees to recolonize the barren treeless tundra landscape of Britain. It probably spread freely and rapidly from the continent due to its light wind-dispersed seeds and ability to thrive in harsh climates, invading mainly via the land-locked North Sea. Birch formed the earliest woodland, spreading over almost all of Britain except at high altitudes, with its range extending northwards as least as far as Aberdeenshire. Other less dominant trees and shrubs in this pre-Boreal wildwood were aspen, willows and juniper.

=== Boreal wildwood ===
The Preboreal was followed by the Boreal period, which began around 7500 BCE and saw a much warmer and drier climate. Accordingly, the composition of the wildwood began to change with the arrival of tree species from continental Europe that were able to thrive in the new conditions. The next tree after birch to invade Britain was Scots pine, which spread across the country thanks to the efficient long-distance wind dispersal of its seeds, allowing the tree to colonise even the remotest areas. Scots pine is also tolerant of a wide range of soil and climatic conditions, even where these are extreme, so that it was able to maintain large, monospecific stands over wide areas of Britain. It could also out-compete birch by casting a deep shade suppressing growth of birch saplings. By the mid-Boreal period, pine had probably largely replaced birch as the dominant forest species, although these species did temporarily coexist in mixed forests of birch, Scots pine and hazel throughout large parts of Northern England.

Pine was followed by hazel, elm (particularly wych elm), oak, and alder; all of which spread throughout Britain except the far North of Scotland. However, these were not successive waves of mass invasion with sequential replacement of one species with another. Rather, the tree species and floristic composition would have varied across the country according to the local climate, soil type and underlying topography. For example, hazel expanded into stands of birch in Scotland to form birch-hazel forests, while assemblages of oak, elm, and hazel rapidly occupied large parts of lowland England. These specific communities were apparently unique to prehistoric Britain, with no modern analogues existing in Europe.

=== Atlantic wildwood ===
During the Atlantic period, the climate became persistently warmer, wetter and more stable, and the development of British native woodland culminated in the invasion of new broadleaved species from Southern Europe such as small-leaved lime. Small-leaved lime arrived in Britain around 5500 – 3000 BC, and eventually spread to form extensive areas of continuous limewood in the English lowlands, reaching a maximum during the Holocene climatic optimum. Under the moister conditions, alder also thrived in the wetter condition and became increasingly common and widespread on the fringes of lakes and peat bogs.

Since the beginning of this long Atlantic period of apparent climate stability, there was a progressive rise in sea level that eventually cut off Ireland, then Britain, from the European continent. As a result, the newly formed English Channel, Irish Sea, and North Sea presented barriers to the invasion of further species, allowed a closed succession to take its course over several thousand years.

With Britain's geographical isolation from the continent, the landscape developed into a patchwork of five broad wildwood provinces determined largely by local geography. These provinces were (1) pine in the eastern Scottish Highlands; (2) birch in the western Scottish Highlands; (3) oak-hazel in southern Scotland, northern England, most of Wales, and parts of Ireland; (4) hazel-elm across most of Ireland and southwest Wales; and (5) lime in lowland England. Lime, elm, and oak were the commonest wildwood trees of the Atlantic period, whilst Scots pine became increasingly rare, being restricted to the Scottish Highlands and dominating nowhere. The wildwood provinces were not strictly subdivided, since they would have included small numbers of trees that were more common in other provinces.

The division of the prehistoric British wildwood into several distinct provinces, each with their own unique tree assemblage, contrasts with the popular view that the natural climax community would have been dominated by oak. Although oak was widespread in Britain during the Atlantic period and would have been present in the various wildwoods, it would rarely have been the dominant tree.

=== Sub-Boreal and sub-Atlantic wildwoods ===
The end of the Atlantic period was characterized by a relatively brief but significant return to cooler and drier conditions, marking the beginning of the Subboreal. During this climatic shift, there were many changes to the wildwood character. The most notable of these changes was a widespread decline of elm across the country, associated with a sudden increase in agricultural weeds such as Plantago and nettle, as well as early Neolithic settlement. Lime also declined and hazel became more common through the impacts of Neolithic peoples on the landscape.

Pine and birch temporarily spread and became dominant again due to the cooler and drier conditions. However, around 700 – 750 BC, the climate became wetter and much colder again, resulting in the expansion of peat bogs over much of Ireland, Scotland, and northern England, and the destruction of large areas of sub-Boreal pine and birch forest.

The Subboreal saw the invasion of even later arrivals to Britain such as beech, hornbeam, and field maple. Beech first appeared in southeast England in about 1000 BCE, and its dispersal from northwest France would have required it to cross the English Channel, which had now fully formed. The most likely agents of beech seed dispersal were birds such as the Eurasian jay and the common raven.

== Climate of the wildwood ==
The Atlantic period ran from about 8000 to about between 4300 and 3100 BCE. The wildwood developed under this relatively stable Holocene Atlantic climate, although there were minor temperature fluctuations over the millennia. Conditions were initially cold and dry during the pre-Boreal, which favoured relatively arctic species with wider northerly distributions such as birch, willow, and juniper. Progression towards the climatic optimum during the relatively warm and wet Atlantic period favoured species with more southerly distributions in Europe.

== Animal species ==
=== Extinct or rare species ===
The British Wildwood housed many animals that are now considered extinct or very rare. Such animals include the aurochs, Eurasian brown bear, Eurasian wolf, Eurasian lynx, European pine marten, wild boar, roe deer, tarpan, red squirrel, Eurasian beaver, European water voles, European edible dormouse, white-tailed eagle, osprey, Eurasian goshawk, red kite, European turtle dove and pearl-bordered fritillary. Of these animals, the white-tailed eagle and the goshawk has been reintroduced in southern Britain.

=== Species that can still be found today ===
There have been animals that existed during the Wildwood period and still exist to this day throughout Britain. Such animals include: red fox, red deer, mountain hare, European hedgehog, black grouse, Eurasian curlew, northern lapwing, ring ouzel, natterjack toad, Atlantic salmon, bees. Since the eradication of natural British Wildwood, none of the animals that still exist today are naturally from natural wildwood.

== Ecology and structure ==
The dynamics governing the structure of the prehistoric climax wildwood have been the subject of much debate given the absence of direct observational evidence.

There are two opposing views regarding the structure of the wildwood landscape. The traditional view is that the wildwood was a uniformly tall, static climax forest with an almost completely closed canopy. On the other hand, Dutch ecologist Frans Vera argued that the structure of the prehistoric woodland in western and central Europe comprised a dynamic mosaic of woodland groves, scrub and open grassland regulated by large herbivores and would have resembled modern wood-pasture, an assumption known as the wood-pasture hypothesis. Fossil records of closed canopy and open land beetle assemblages now suggest that the structure of the UK wildwood was intermediate between these extremes.

During the Mesolithic, the British wildwood ecosystem comprised a relatively closed canopy interspersed with small but significant gaps. The relatively closed nature of the canopy is evidenced by the preponderance of fossils of shade-tolerant species at this time such as elm and lime. Although impacts of herbivore grazing are acknowledged to have played an appreciable role in shaping the wildwood landscape of Mesolithic Britain, other disturbance factors such as forest fires, insect attacks, flooding, windthrow from storms and natural death of trees are thought to have been more important in creating these woodland gaps.

== Decline and disappearance ==
During the Neolithic period, around 4000 BC, British wildwoods began to decline as the impacts of agriculture became more widespread and persistent, farming practices became more sedentary and the technology improved with the advent of metal tools. Although Mesolithic peoples had previously cleared forests to create open areas for hunting and gathering, the impacts they exerted would have been minimal and localized.

In the English lowlands, lime was extensively cleared to make way for agriculture, as this tree typically grew on the most fertile, well-drained soils. By the Bronze Age, civilization had proceeded to encroach on much of the wildwood in the remoter upland places such as the Scottish Highlands, northern England, and Wales. It is estimated that by the Iron Age, over 50% of the original wildwood covering Britain had been cleared.
