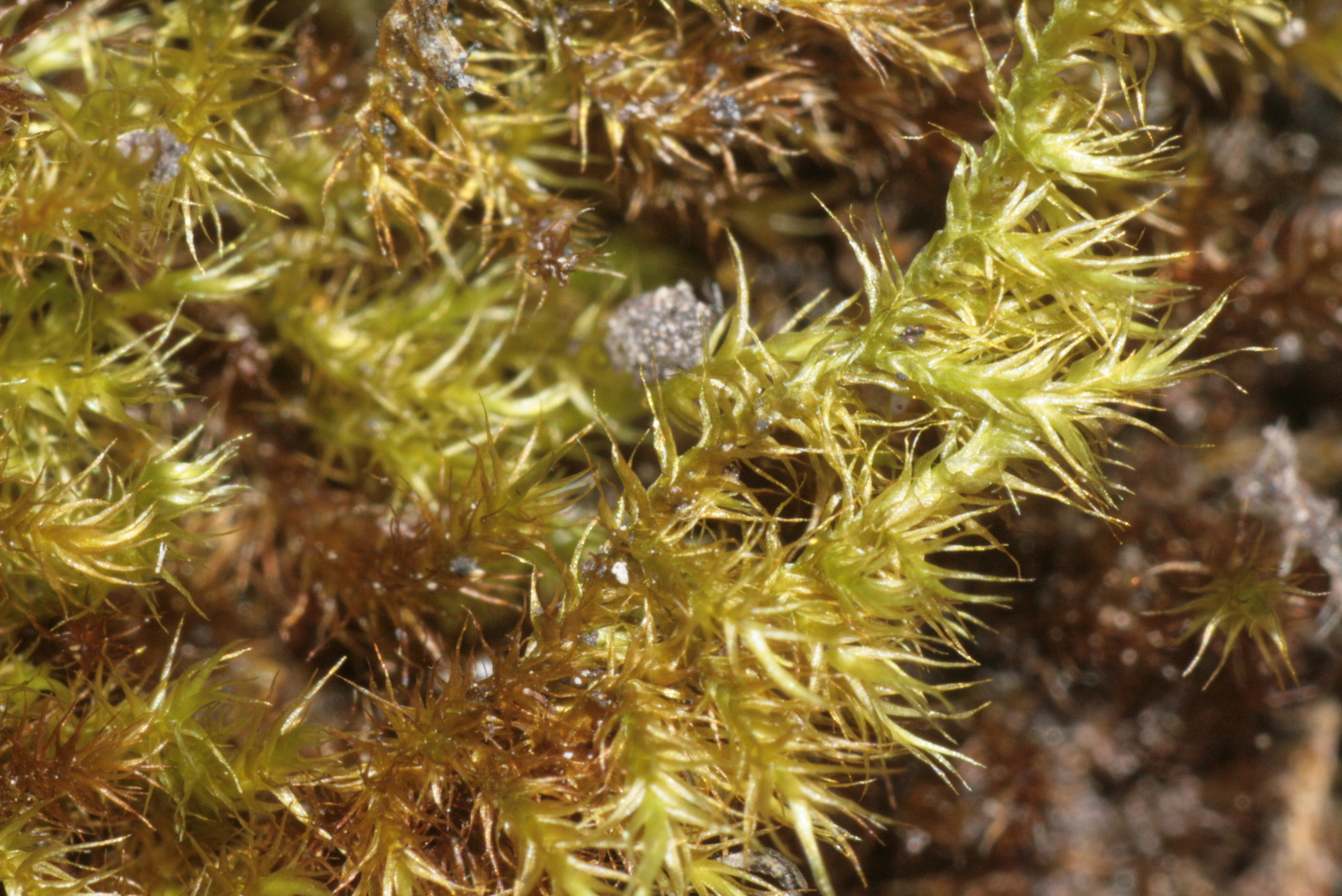

Scientific classification
- Kingdom: Plantae
- Division: Bryophyta
- Class: Bryopsida
- Subclass: Bryidae
- Order: Hypnales
- Family: Amblystegiaceae
- Genus: Campylium
- Species: C. chrysophyllum

Binomial name
- Campylium chrysophyllum J.M.Lange, 1887

Synonyms
- Amblystegium geophilum Stirt.; Campylium chrysophyllum var. chrysophyllum; Campylium sinuolatum (Kindb.) Kindb.; Campylium subsecundum Broth.; Campylium unicostatum (Müll.Hal. & Kindb.) Kindb.; Hypnum chrysophyllum var. preuerianum Saut.; Hypnum fragile Brid.; Hypnum inordinatum Brid.; Hypnum preuerianum (Saut.) A.Jaeger; Hypnum sinuolatum Kindb.; Hypnum subchrysophyllum Anzi; Hypnum unicostatum Müll.Hal. & Kindb.

= Campylium chrysophyllum =

Species of plant

Campylium chrysophyllum is a species of moss in the Amblystegiaceae family. It has a cosmopolitan distribution.

Campylium chrysophyllum is known to be able to use artificial light to grow in places which are otherwise devoid of natural light, such as Niagara Cave.
