= Campylium protensum =

Scientific classification
- Kingdom: Plantae
- Division: Bryophyta
- Class: Bryopsida
- Subclass: Bryidae
- Order: Hypnales
- Family: Amblystegiaceae
- Genus: Campylium
- Species: C. protensum

Binomial name
- Campylium protensum (Brid.) Kindb.

Species of moss

Campylium protensum is a species of moss belonging to the family Amblystegiaceae.

It has almost cosmopolitan distribution.
