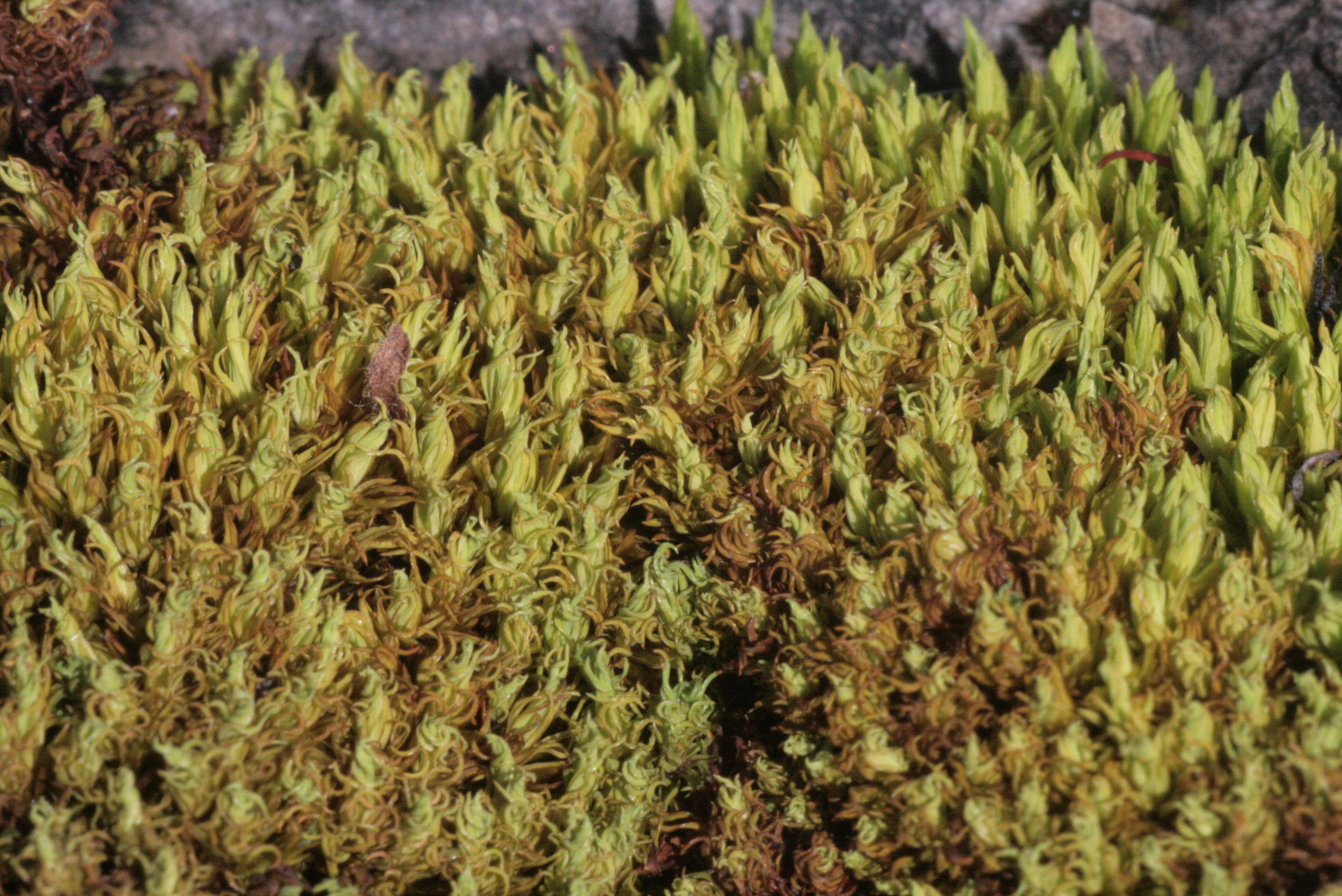
- Tortella inclinata

Scientific classification
- Kingdom: Plantae
- Division: Bryophyta
- Class: Bryopsida
- Subclass: Dicranidae
- Order: Pottiales
- Family: Pottiaceae
- Genus: Tortella (Müll.Hal.) Limpr.

= Tortella (plant) =

Genus of mosses

Tortella is a genus of mosses belonging to the family Pottiaceae. The genus was first described by Karl Müller and has a cosmopolitan distribution

== Species ==
The following species are recognised in the genus Tortella:

- Tortella afrocespitosa (Müll.Hal.) Broth.
- Tortella alpicola Dixon, 1929
- Tortella aprica Brotherus, 1902
- Tortella arctica (Arnell) A.C.Crundwell & Nyholm
- Tortella bambergeri (Schimp.) Broth.
- Tortella brotheri Brotherus, 1902
- Tortella bryotropica Zander, 1987
- Tortella cirrifolia Brotherus, 1902
- Tortella contortifolia Brotherus, 1906
- Tortella cryptocarpa Zander, 1993
- Tortella × cuspidatissima (Cardot & Thér.) O.Werner, Köckinger & Ros
- Tortella cyrtobasis Dixon, 1935
- Tortella dakinii J.H.Willis, 1955
- Tortella densa (Lorentz & Molendo) Crundw. & Nyholm
- Tortella eckendorffii Zander, 1993
- Tortella erosodentata Sakurai
- Tortella eutrichostomum (Müll.Hal.) Broth.
- Tortella fasciculata (Culm.) Culm
- Tortella flavovirens Brotherus, 1902
- Tortella fleischeri (E.Bauer) J.J.Amann
- Tortella fragilis Limpricht, 1888
- Tortella fragillima Potier de la Varde, 1955
- Tortella fristedtii Brotherus, 1902
- Tortella fruchartii Zander, 1993
- Tortella germainii Brotherus, 1902
- Tortella goniospora Zander, 1993
- Tortella grossiretis E.B.Bartram
- Tortella guatemalensis E.B.Bartram
- Tortella himantina (Besch.) Broth.
- Tortella hosseusii Herzog, 1939
- Tortella humilis Jennings, 1913
- Tortella hyalinoblasta Broth.
- Tortella inclinata Limpricht, 1888
- Tortella inflexa Brotherus, 1902
- Tortella involutifolia Dixon, 1932
- Tortella japonica (Besch.) Broth.
- Tortella jugicola Paris, 1906
- Tortella kmetiana Pilous, 1961
- Tortella knightii Brotherus, 1902
- Tortella lilliputana Zander, 1993
- Tortella limbata Geheeb & Herzog, 1910
- Tortella limosella (Stirt.) P.W.Richards & E.C.Wallace
- Tortella lindmaniana Brotherus, 1900
- Tortella linearis Zander, 1993
- Tortella malacophylla (Müll.Hal.) Paris
- Tortella mediterranea Köckinger, Lüth, O.Werner & Ros
- Tortella mooreae Sainsbury, 1949
- Tortella nano-tortuosa (Müll.Hal.) Watts & Whitel.
- Tortella natalensicespitosa (Müll.Hal.) Broth.
- Tortella nitida Brotherus, 1902
- Tortella novae-valesiae Brotherus, 1916
- Tortella pallido-viridis (Müll.Hal.) Broth.
- Tortella perrufula Brotherus, 1902
- Tortella pilcomayica Herzog, 1916
- Tortella platyphylla Broth. ex Iisiba
- Tortella pseudocaespitosa Brotherus, 1902
- Tortella pseudofragilis (Thér.) Köckinger & Hedenäs
- Tortella richardsii E.B.Bartram
- Tortella rigens Albertson, 1946
- Tortella rubripes Brotherus, 1902
- Tortella simplex H.Robinson, 1977
- Tortella smithii C.C.Townsend, 1969
- Tortella somaliae Zander, 1993
- Tortella spinidens (G.Roth ex Zodda) Levier & G.Roth
- Tortella spitsbergensis (Bizot & Thér.) O.Werner, Köckinger & Ros
- Tortella subflavovirens Brotherus & Watts, 1911
- Tortella theriotii Broth. & P.de la Varde
- Tortella torquescens (Schimp. ex Müll.Hal.) Broth.
- Tortella tortuloides (Sull. & Lesq.) Broth.
- Tortella tortuosa Limpricht, 1888
- Tortella undulatifolia Dixon, 1942
- Tortella vernicosa Brotherus, 1902
- Tortella walkeri Zander, 1993
- Tortella xanthocarpa Brotherus, 1902
