= Ashcombe Bottom =

English valley

Coordinates: 50.890°N 0.048°W

- Valley
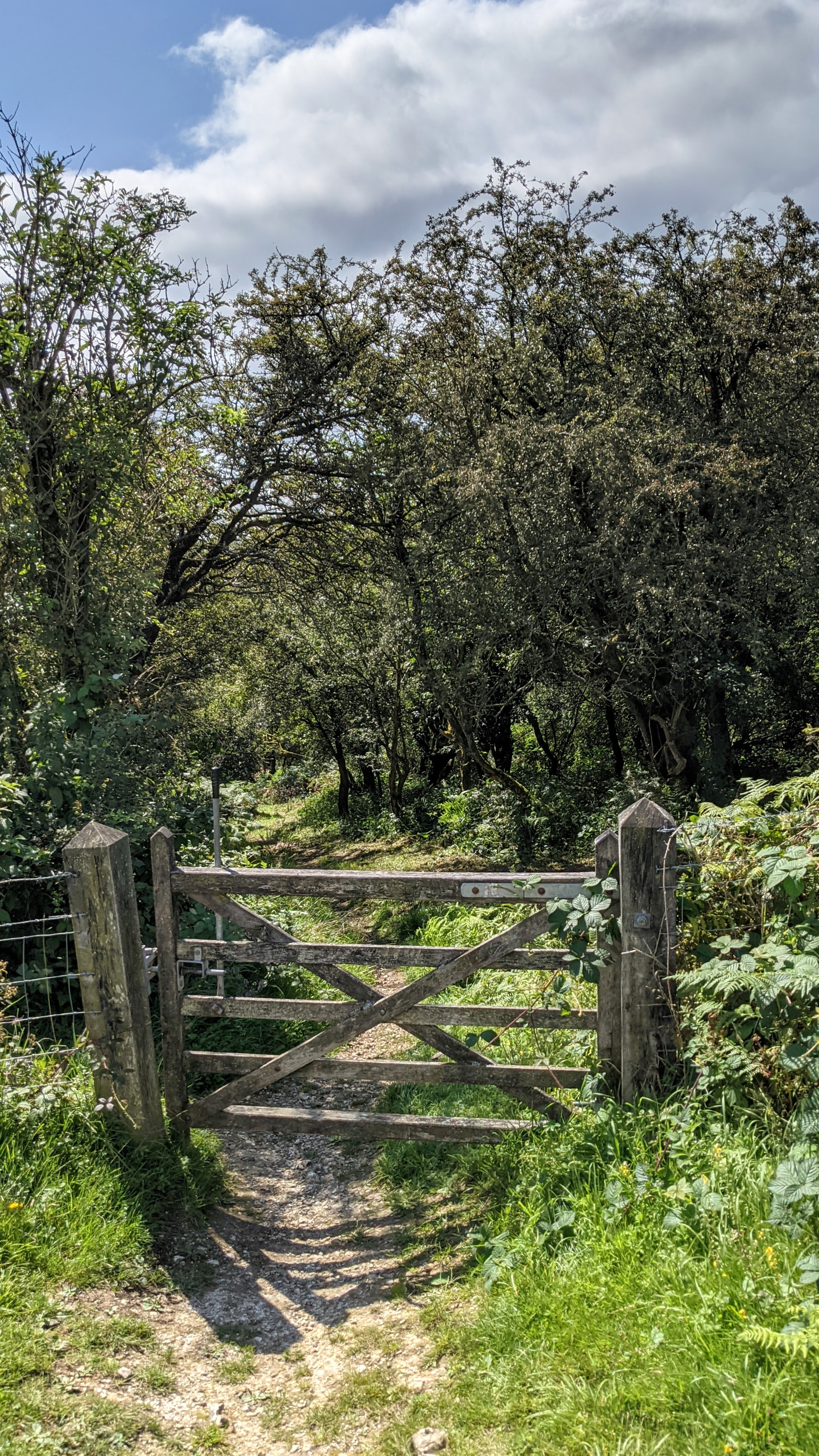

- Location within the United Kingdom
- Area: 0.66 km^{2} (0.25 sq mi)
- OS grid reference: TQ373119
- Civil parish: St Johns Without
- District: Lewes
- Shire county: East Sussex
- Country: England
- Sovereign state: United Kingdom
- Post town: Lewes
- Postcode district: BN7

Ashcombe Bottom (TQ 373 119) is a 66 hectares (160 acres) woodland valley owned by the National Trust that runs south from Blackcap, East Sussex, England. The area is nested in the South Downs and can only be reached by walking or cycling from Lewes, Falmer, Ditchling Beacon or up the Clayton to Offham escarpment from Plumpton. It sits in the parish of St John Without and East Chiltington. The name Ashcombe refers to a Saxon named Aecci, not ash trees as might be assumed. It is part of the Clayton to Offham Escarpment Site of Special Scientific Interest.

== History ==
David Bangs, a Sussex field naturalist, says, "You can view Ashcombe in two ways. It is both old scrub on a transition to woodland, and recovering ancient woodland that has been through a very narrow ‘bottleneck’ in its recent history in which almost all of it was lost, together with much of its ancient woodland character". There are no open growing veteran trees above ground as the area has been heavily damaged, but there are ancient stools of ash showing that a woodland had been there previously. The wood's old name was ‘Bocholt’ or ‘Boxholt’. ‘Boc’ was Saxon for beech, although beech is rare there now.

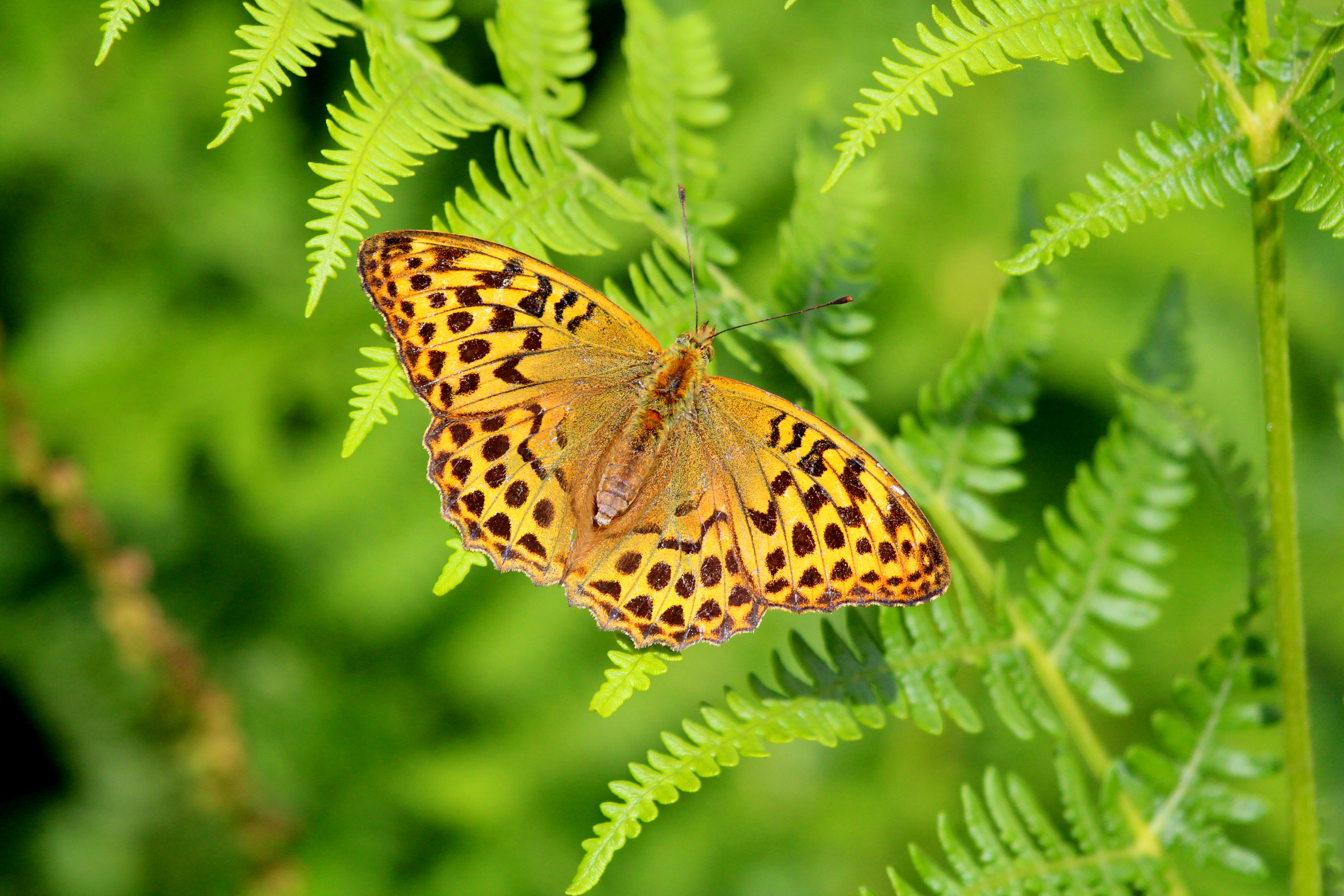
Silver-washed fritillary at Ashcombe Bottom

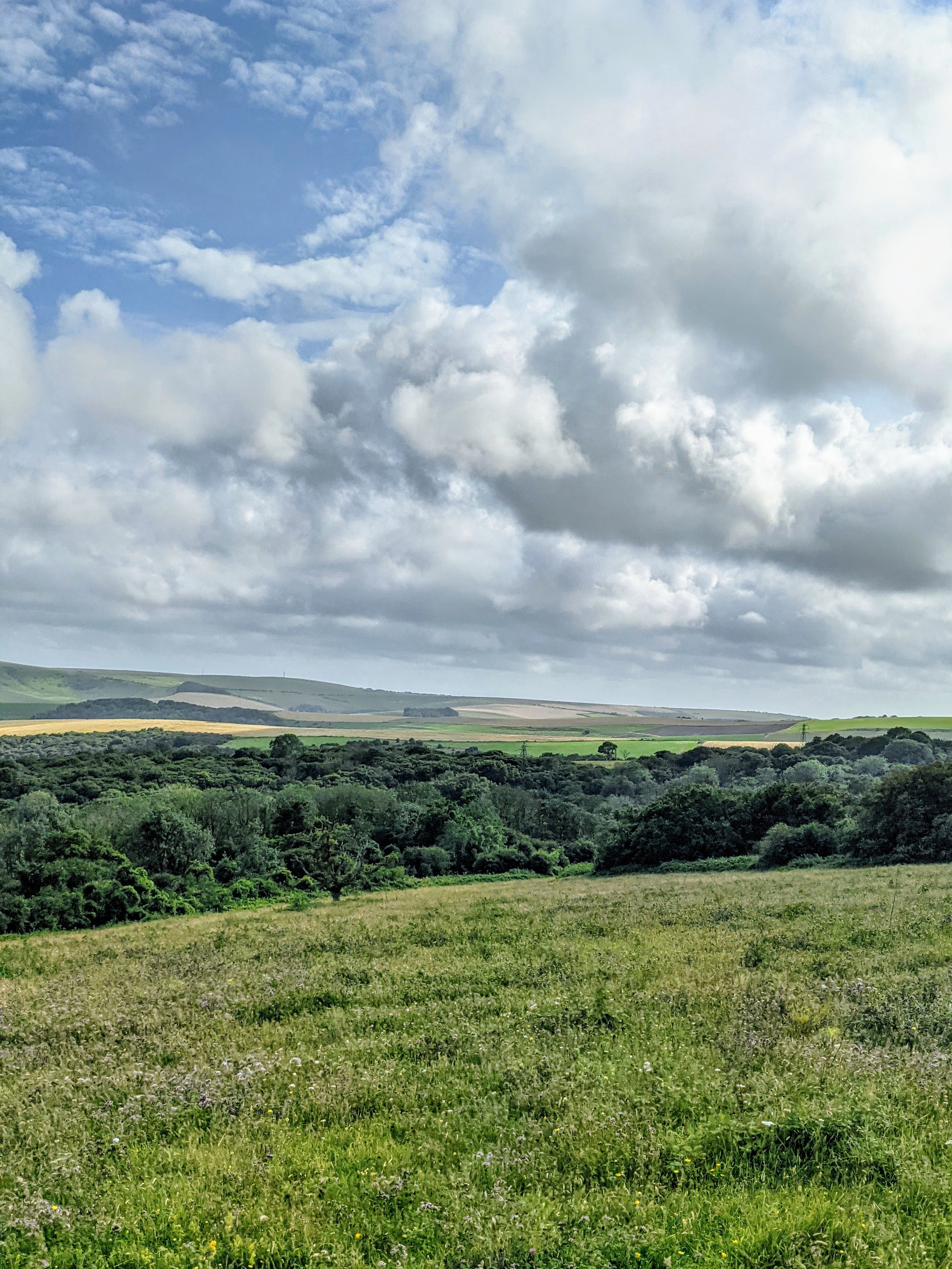
Looking southeast over the east side of Ashcombe Bottom from Blackcap.

The area is said to have acted as cover for Simon De Montfort’s troops waiting to commence the Battle of Lewes in 1264, and later to have been a place of attempted refuge from the slaughter.

In around 1870 a primeval cavern, 3 metres across, broke open in Ashcombe's hillside. It was found to contain two urns, one wheel-thrown and the other hand-moulded.

In 1993, the area (TQ 373 118) was bought by the National Trust with Blackcap, Mount Harry and the Clayton to Offham Escarpment. Since that time the woodland has managed better for biodiversity, although nightingale and turtle dove still follow the national trend and can only be heard rarely now.

== Biodiversity ==
The area is species-rich and at least twenty-eight scrub species have been found there. It has scrub-grown oaks and silver birch, nut-laden hazel trees, tangling bryony skeins, rosebay willowherb, berry-laden spindle and honeysuckle and occasional wood sage. There is a lots of ash which is being managed for ash dieback.

There are muntjac deer and have been occasional sightings of hen harrier and long-eared owl. In spring, the songs of blackcap, garden warbler, chiffchaff, common whitethroat and lesser whitethroat are dominant in the wood. Cuckoo can also be heard and, until the 1980s, the songs of nightingale and turtle dove were frequent. Under the canopy of the trees, the rides have many butterflies and up-to twenty-eight species have been recorded in one visit, including white admiral, silver-washed and dark green fritillary as well as their commoner cousins: red admiral, peacock and comma. Dormice are also present in the woods and surrounding areas.

== Eastern valley side ==
The best surviving chalk grassland is along the south east, where part of it is designated as statutory access land. The older fragments are dominated by a soft mat of rockrose, with cowslip in spring and devil's bit in late summer.

== Western slopes ==
The western valley side has the older woodland and in the open areas there are patches of bluebell, with early purple orchid, barren strawberry and primrose. There are dingy and checkered skipper butterflies and rare thimble morel, bleach cup fungus and ribbed stark-cup fungi near the old thorn.

Since the National Trust took it over the gentle slopes descending from Broad Shackles (TQ 372 113) have recovered from being ploughed and now have barren strawberry, basil and autumn ladies' tresses orchid growing as well as devil's-bit. Around the rockrose there are fairy rings of a large golden-tawny web-cap fungus in autumn.
