= East Chiltington =

Village in East Sussex, England

Coordinates: 50.921°N 0.050°W

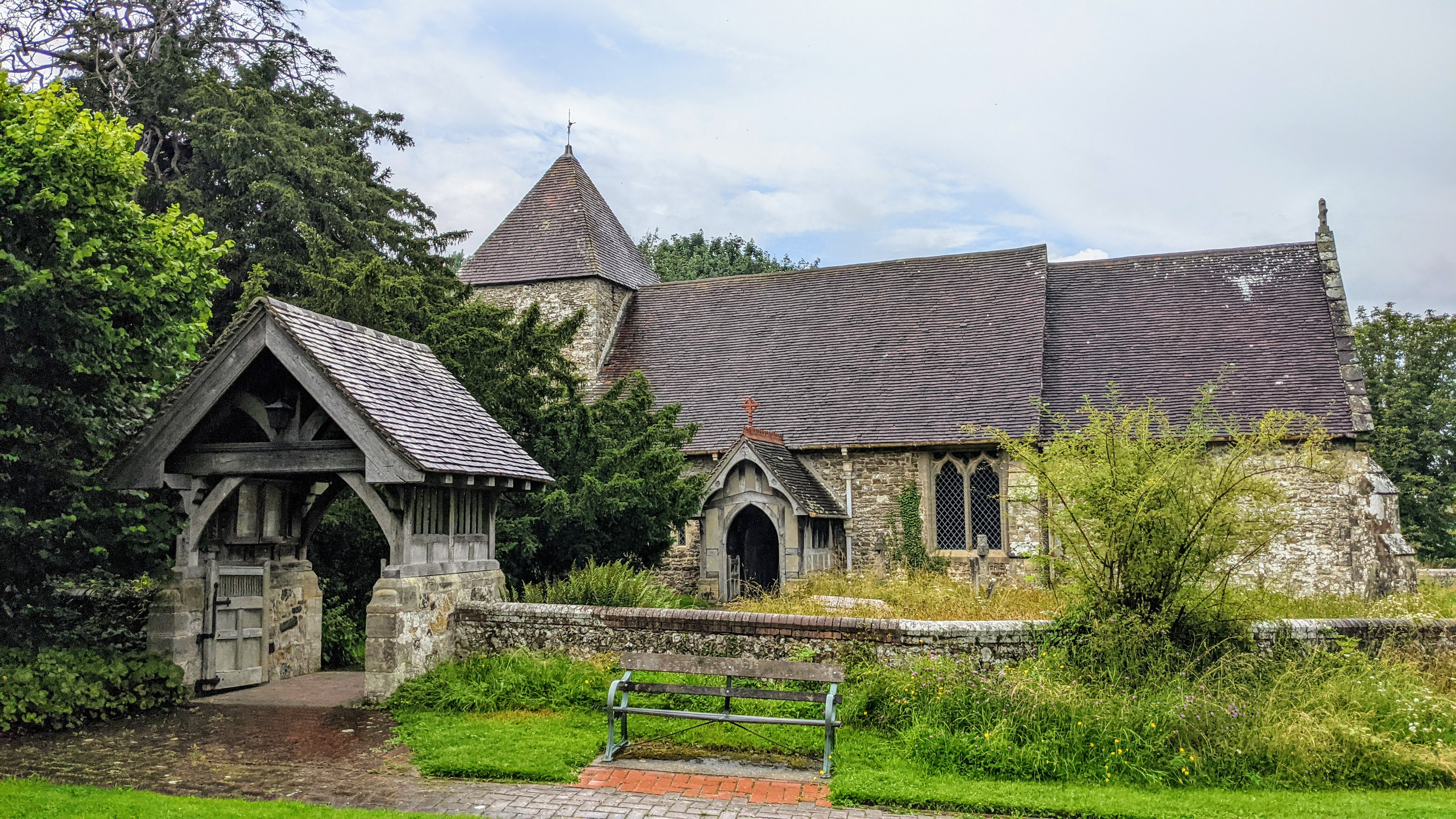
- East Chiltington Parish Church

- Location within East Sussex
- Area: 9.75 km^{2} (3.76 sq mi)
- Population: 474 (Electors-2011)
  - Density: 61/sq mi (24/km^{2})
- OS grid reference: TQ389148
  - London: 41 miles (66 km) N
- Civil parish: East Chiltington
- District: Lewes
- Shire county: East Sussex
- Region: South East
- Country: England
- Sovereign state: United Kingdom
- Post town: LEWES
- Postcode district: BN7
- Dialling code: 01273
- Police: Sussex
- Fire: East Sussex
- Ambulance: South East Coast
- UK Parliament: Lewes
- Website: http://www.eastchiltington.net/

East Chiltington is a village and civil parish in the Lewes District of East Sussex, England. It is centred four miles (5.9 km) south-east of Burgess Hill and five miles (8 km) north-west of Lewes. It is a strip parish of 3.76 square miles (9.7 km^{2}), stretching northward (south of Plumpton) from the crest of the South Downs. The village church is 13th century in origin; the vicar also has charge of two churches in Plumpton. Near the church there is a pub called The Jolly Sportsman. The Sussex Greensand Way, a Roman road, runs from east to west through the centre of the parish.

Eton College owns a 500 acre plot in the parish and in 2021 applied to build 3,000 homes in the area north of the railway line. The proposal has met with resistance from locals, citing amongst other things the risk to the biodiversity of the area.

There is no public access to the majority of the banks of Bevern Stream through East Chiltington.

== Geography ==
The parish of East Chiltington comprises the South Downs from the top end of Ashcombe Bottom and the Blackcap nature reserve, down the Clayton to Offham Escarpment to the Sussex Weald stretching north and northeast to the Chailey parish. To its east is St John (without), to its south Falmer and to its west the Plumpton parish.

The area is remarkable for its long stretches of intact flowery lane sides. There are at least five spots along Novington Lane with the rare meadow cranesbill where it flowers in July. There are also spotted orchid. oxeye daisy, bird's foot trefoil, hoary ragwort and meadowsweet. The area also has many small archaic meadows, one of which is of superb quality, and lovingly cared for, with a big display of southern marsh orchid, marsh marigold, ragged robin, heath spotted orchid, and both black and carnation sedges.

At Brookhouse, East Chiltington, (TQ375 155) there used to be a 2.25 m girth pollarded native Black Poplar by the former barns, on a site that has been separated for 165 years from the banks of the Bevern Stream by the railway line. This is a tree species with only scattered wild survivors in Sussex, though many have lately been planted. The tree occurs on the Woodland Trust's Ancient Tree Inventory.

=== The Bevern stream ===
The Bevern stream runs through the middle of the parish, flowing eastwards to the River Ouse. It is fed by the clear chalky waters of Plumpton Mill Stream arising at moated Plumpton Place. It runs over gravelly beds and provides some of the best spawning ground in the area for sea trout. It also supports mayflies, caddis flies and great crested newts, and many birds drink from the waters, including summer visitors like nightingale.

However, like many of the Sussex streams and rivers, the Bevern stream has not been left unpolluted. In late 2016 the whole of the Bevern Stream was polluted by a huge volume of slurry from Plumpton College Dairy Unit. All the fish in it were killed. In recent years, however, sea trout have been seen in the Bevern stream at East Chiltington, and the stream is healthy again.

=== Woodland ===
There is impressive woodland in East Chiltington. Beneath the Downs the large woods sit on Gault Clay. Further north, the land is fertile lower greensand so there is more arable land and less woodland. The remains of Home Wood has now largely been destroyed for farm land.

==== Home, Great Home and Middle Home Wood ====
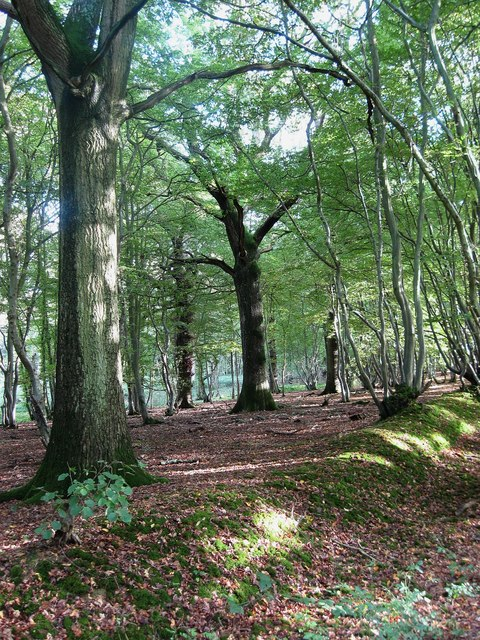
Great Home Wood

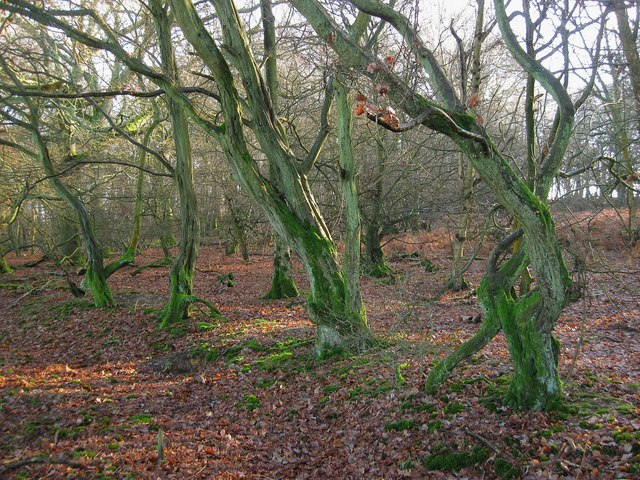
Middle Home Wood

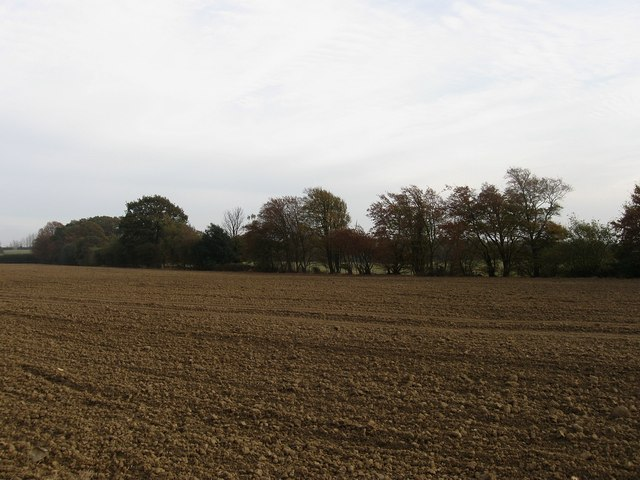
Site of Wet Home Wood

Before 1650, Home Wood was 300 acres and an important demesne wood of the Priory of St Pancras at Lewes. The majority of it was converted to farmland by the church and the commoners dispossessed. The footprint of the lost medieval Home Wood begins at the north end of Novington Lane. Hattons Green was once lawns at the edge of medieval Home Wood, but it is just paddocks and cottages now. The green and Homewoodgate Farm marked its western edge. There is still a small woodland called Home Wood which has old holly, coppiced beech and old wood pasture feel. Next to it was Novingdean Common, which was a common of 40 acres lost to the people after 1600.

Great and Middle Home Wood are the last remaining large fragments of the wood. Great Home Wood (TQ 372 182) spans the East Chiltington and the Chailey parishes. The northern end had drifts of wild daffodils. The wood has large amount of coppiced oak. They stand with old hornbeam coppice and a mixture of ash and birch poles. There is pine at the south end. The recent re-coppicing has failed because deer have eaten out the inadequately protected regrowth and killed the old coppice stools. Consequently, nightingales or warblers are unlikely to breed here.

Middle Home Wood (TQ 378 174) has hornbeam, hazel and oak and in spring many bluebells. There is a gentle valley stream at its centre and a derelict unimproved pasture along its north side, which a footpath crosses.

Both Great Home and Middle Home woods have suffered losses to make a D Day Landing Ground in the 2nd World War and modern farming has done its bit too. Another fragment of the ancient Home Wood, Wet Home Wood, was cleared in recent years too and only tiny bits along its boundaries survive.

==== Long Wood ====
Long Wood (TQ 367 142) has oak, hazel with bluebells in spring and much birch. It has laurel thickets and 12 ancient woodland indicator species. Silver-washed fritillary butterflies and harlequin longhorn beetles can be seen here.

There are drained ponds between it and Cottage Wood, which have become a marshy area (TQ 381 192) with frogs, dragonflies and damselflies flying above scarce wetland plants, such as cyperus sedge, wood club rush and lesser marshwort.

==== Warningore wood ====
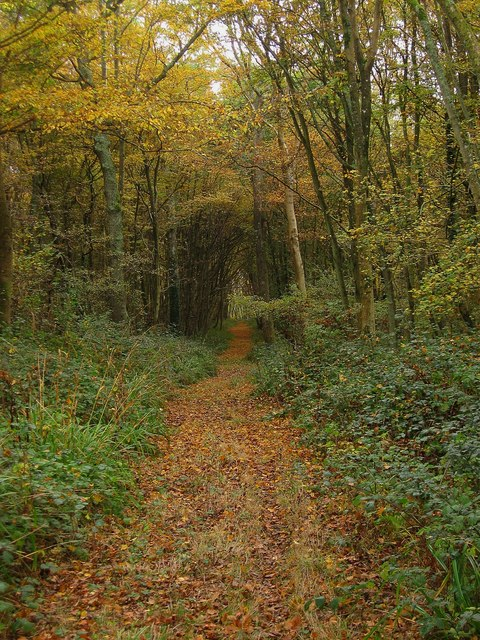
Track, Warningore Wood

Warningore wood (TQ 382 140) spans the East Chiltington and St John Without parish and is a solid hornbeam coppice par excellence. It lies in the Gault Clay vale below Blackcap and the ground is sticky and difficult for farming. Consequently it is still a big wood with ancient trees. Amongst the hornbeam is wych elm, wild service, crab apple, spindle, guelder rose and aspen. As many as 25 ancient woodland indicator species can be found there, including early purple and butterfly orchids. It suffered from the two world wars when wood was needed when many of the standards were clear felled and not regrown.

The wood was a candidate SSSI. If that designation had been completed the rich herbaceous vegetation of the wide rides which included old Wealden plants like ragged robin may still be present. Unfortunately chalk rubble has been dumped along them.

=== Novington sandpits ===
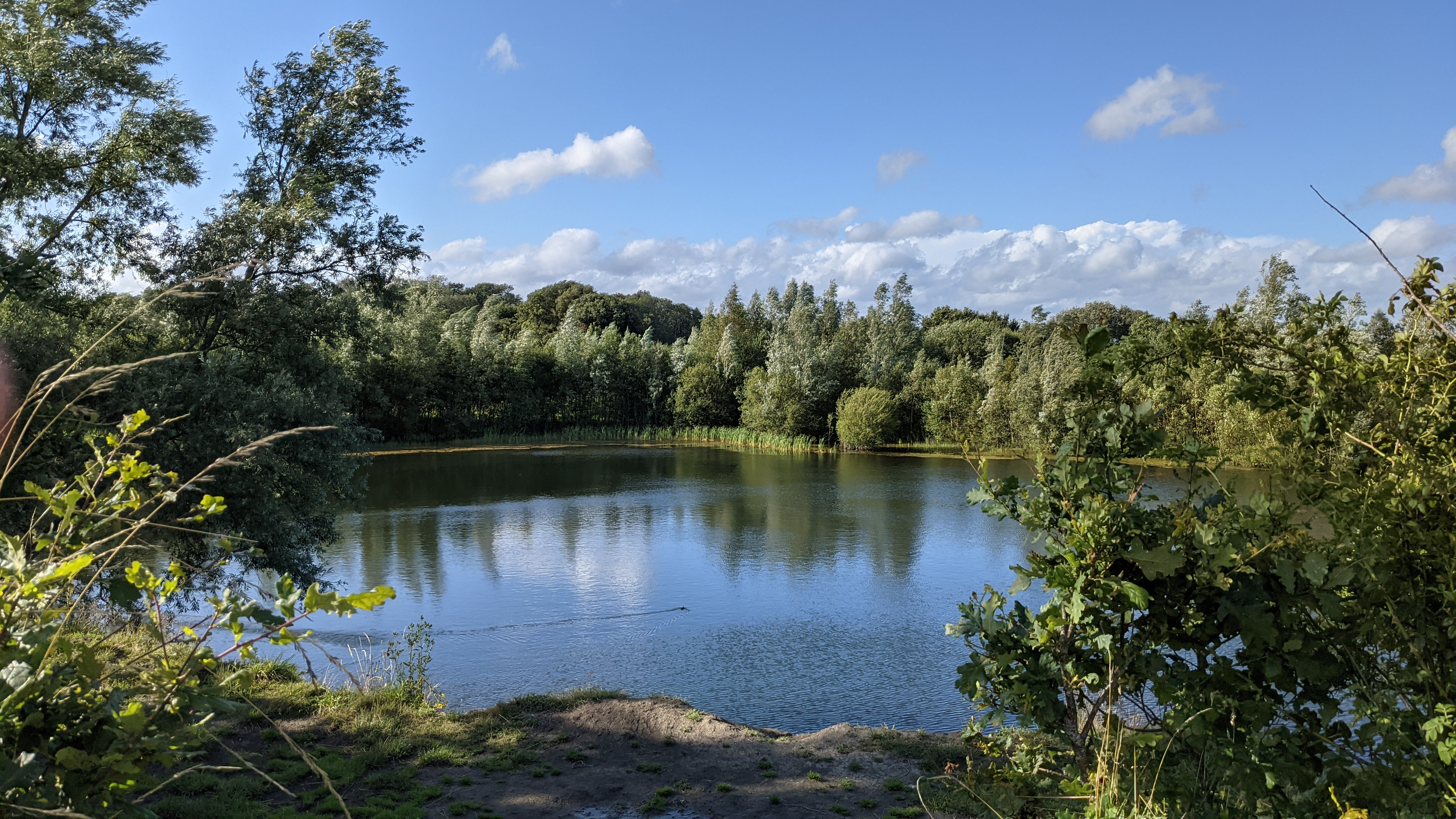
Novington sandpits

The disused Novington sandpit (TQ 368 145) stands between Long Wood and Stanton's Farm. It was used to extract the sand that lies between the chalk downs and the clays of the Low Weald. The quarry was opened in 1949 and continued into the 1960s before stopping and briefly resuming in the 1990s before the lakes became lower than the water table. A further pit lying to the east was worked between 2003 and circa 2013. The lakes are now stunning and could support much wildlife and be rich in biodiversity. Unfortunately, they are currently licensed to a private owner who has left them unmanaged and abandoned with threatening keep out notices, despite sitting in the South Downs National Park. The lakes are currently frequented by tufted duck, little grebe, Canada geese, coot and mallard. In February coltsfoot spangles the fawn-and-pink sands, and fat mating toads are there in numbers. The pools have nice vegetation and pond snails, and the air is buzzing with mayflies, dragonflies and damselflies in summer. However, at least the western pool is heavily invaded with Australian swamp stonecrop and they are in need of urgent management to prevent the spread of invasive species through the local watercourses. The pits are in need of proper closure and management for wildlife and public recreation.

=== Scarp and downland ===
Clayton to Offham Escarpment is a Site of Special Scientific Interest, which stretches from Hassocks in the west and passes through many parishes including East Chiltington, to Lewes in the east. The site is of biological importance due to its rare chalk grassland habitat along with its woodland and scrub. At the top of the scarp are two National Trust reserves, Blackcap and Ashcombe Bottom.

==== Ashcombe Bottom ====
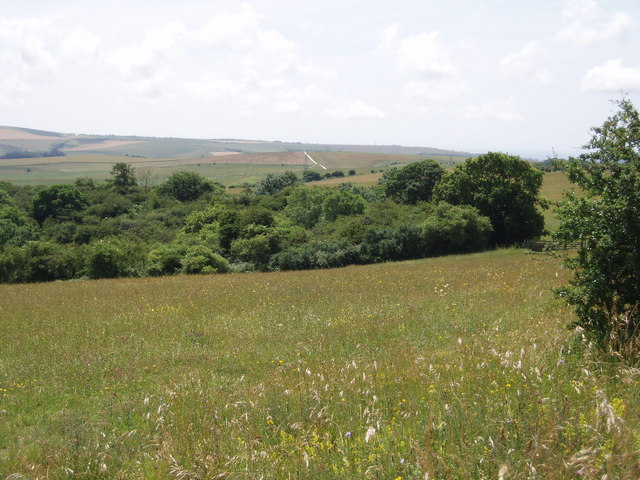
Ashcombe Bottom

Ashcombe Bottom is a woodland valley that runs south from Blackcap. One corner is in the East Chiltington parish while the majority is in St John Without. In 1993 Ashcombe Bottom (TQ 373 118) was bought by the National Trust with Blackcap, Mount Harry, Win Green and most of the scarp. It is rich in scrubland species and has oak, ash, silver birch, hazel, bryony, rosebay willowherb, spindle, honeysuckle and occasional wood sage. The ash which is being managed for ash dieback. It is a biodiverse area with many butterflies and migrant birds in spring.

==== Blackcap ====
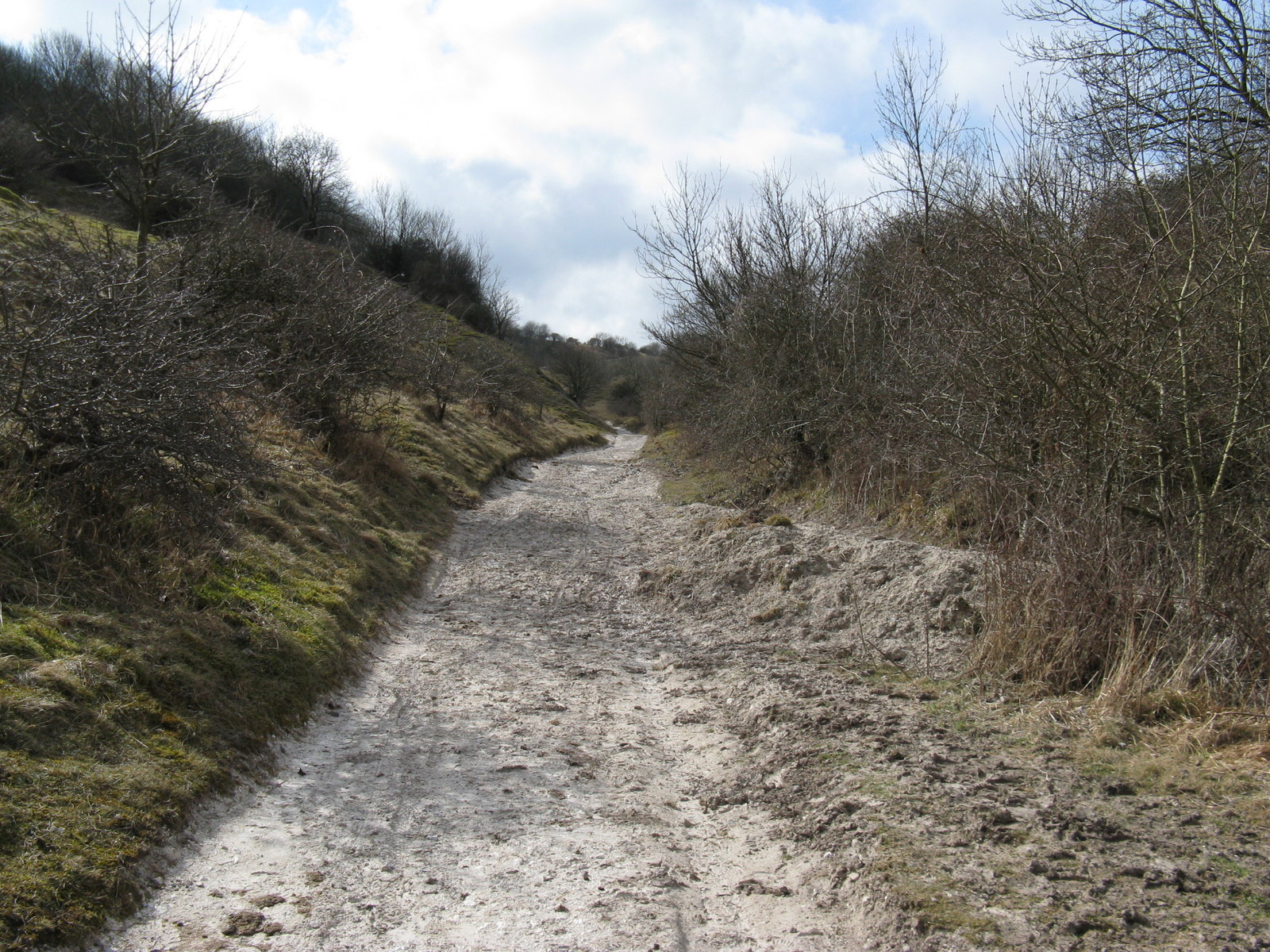
Warningore Bostall heading towards Blackcap

Blackcap is a Downland peak which like Ashcombe Bottom has been under the National Trust’s ownership since 1993. It forms part of the National Trust Blackcap nature reserve. There is a ridgeway that connects Blackcap and Mount Harry. These two peaks are unfenced and open, as the old Downs were, and the Down pasture is recovering from past damage. Cattle and sheep wander freely. The scarp top retains some rich ancient grassland fragments, especially where the slope begins to tip northwards and you can find frog and bee orchid and there are tiny fragments of heathy grassland and even ling heather. In autumn the waxcap fungal flora can be spectacularly colourful. 21 old meadow species have been counted there. Next to the top of the Warningore Bostal, are a cluster of 12 smallish round barrows, each one with a ‘pillage dimple’ in the top, but otherwise well-preserved.

== Notable buildings ==
Notable areas around East Chiltington

=== Parish church ===
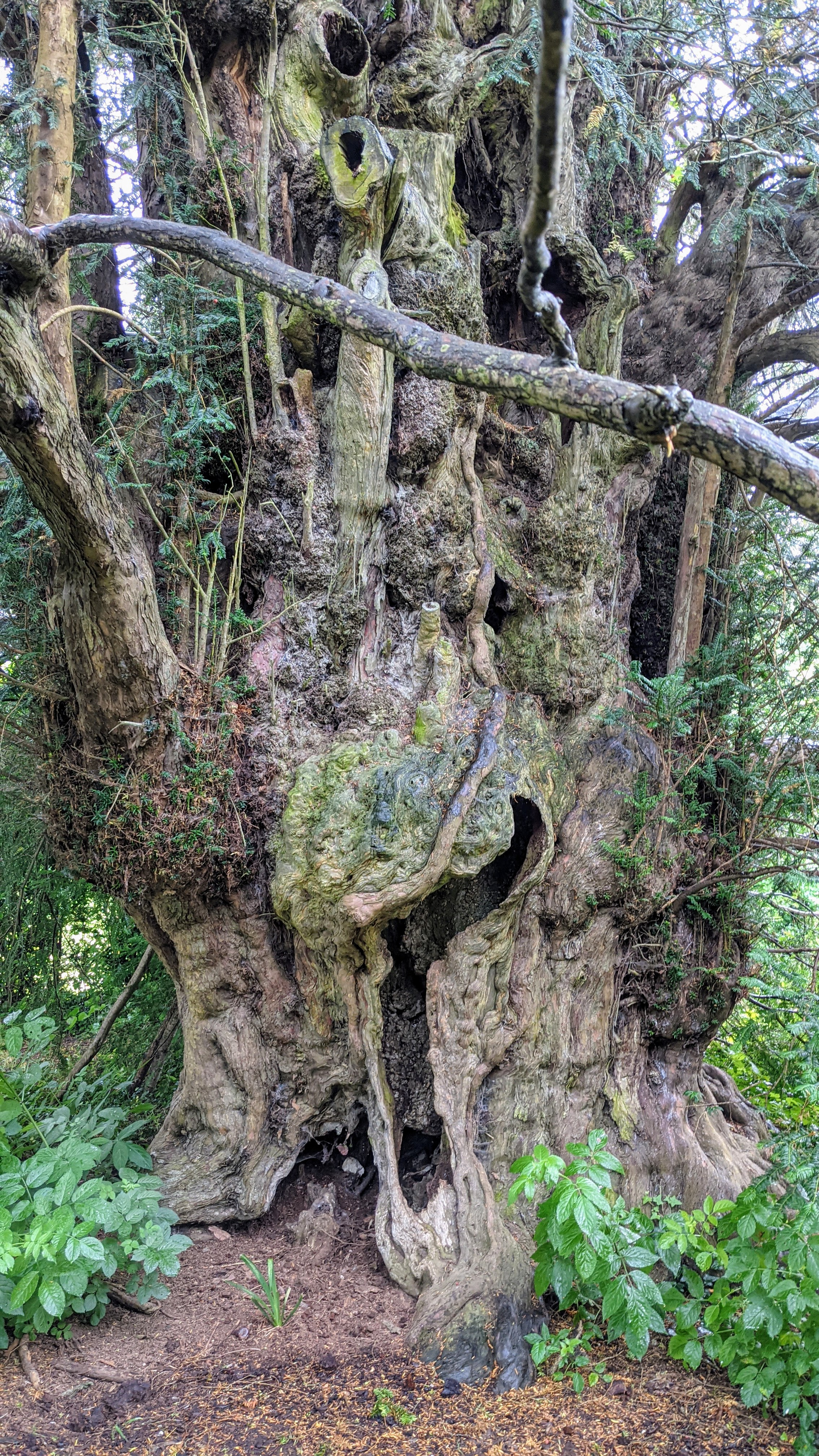
Yew at the parish church

The parish church (TQ 369 151) was once the chapel of a detached part of Westmeston parish hence the name of the lane, Chapel Lane, and farm, Chapel Farm. It was built in the 12th century. Quite fascinatingly, the church which has walls, nave, chancel and tower made of winklestone. It is a church made of fossils. Big winkle shells, Viviparus, stand proud of the stone, reddish or grey, and very similar to the water snail shells you can pick from riversides, which are of the same genus, though they live 135 million years later.

The church has one of the largest yew trees in Sussex and maintains its wild flower meadows proudly. It declares on entry to look out for its sweet violet, cuckoo flower, bluebell, lords-and-ladies, birdsfoot trefoil, adder's tongue, knapweed, common spotted and green-winged orchid, cat's ear, agrimony, yarrow, lesser stitchwort, vervain and rough hawkbit as well as its perennial grasses which include yorkshire fog, meadow foxtail and cocksfoot. The church is currently closed (2021).

=== Hurst Barns ===
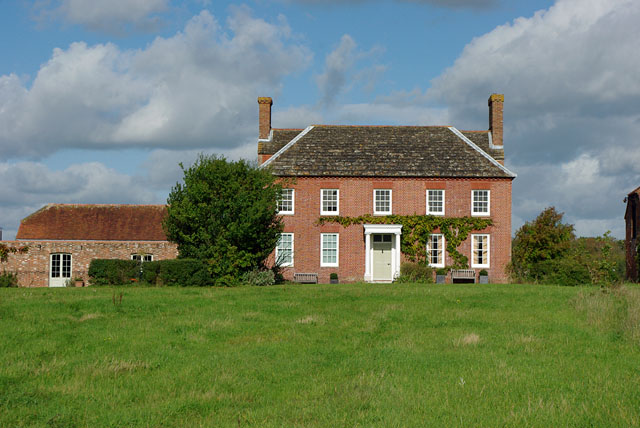
Main house, Hurst Barns

The largest estate in the area is Hurst Barns (TQ 383 160) at around 500 acres. It has a handsome 18th century farmhouse, cottages, an old threshing barn and wooden (converted) granary. It has a line of lime trees. It has been bought by the Earl of Albemarle.

== Governance ==
East Chiltington is governed at the local level by East Chiltington Parish Council which consists of seven councillors meeting every two months. The parish council represents the parish on matters governed at District and County level.

East Chiltington lies within the Chailey ward for the next tier of government, East Sussex County Council. The ward also includes Chailey, Ditchling, St John Without, Newick, Plumpton, Streat, Westmeston and Wivelsfield. The County Council provides services such as roads and transport, social services, libraries and trading standards.

The next level of government is Lewes District Council. The District council supplies services such as refuse collection, planning consent, leisure amenities and council tax collection. East Chiltington is covered by the Plumpton, Streat, East Chiltington and St John (Without) ward which returns a single seat.

The UK Parliament constituency for East Chiltington is Lewes.
