= Streat =

Village in East Sussex, England

Coordinates: 50.92°N 0.08°W

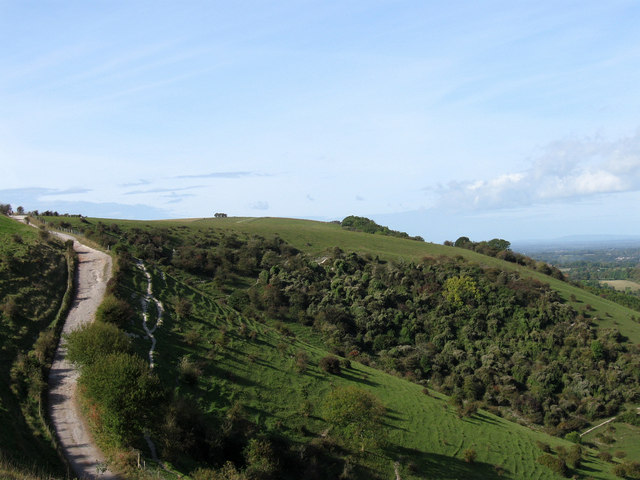
- Streat Hill in the National Park

- Location within East Sussex
- Area: 5.2 km^{2} (2.0 sq mi)
- Population: 158 (Parish-2011)
  - Density: 90/sq mi (35/km^{2})
- OS grid reference: TQ351151
  - London: 40 miles (64 km) N
- Civil parish: Streat
- District: Lewes
- Shire county: East Sussex
- Region: South East
- Country: England
- Sovereign state: United Kingdom
- Post town: HASSOCKS
- Postcode district: BN6
- Police: Sussex
- Fire: East Sussex
- Ambulance: South East Coast
- UK Parliament: Lewes

Streat is a village and parish in the Lewes district of East Sussex, England, 3 miles (4.8 km) south-east of Burgess Hill and 5 miles (8.0 km) west of Lewes, within the South Downs National Park.

The 11th-century parish church has no dedication; the ecclesiastical parish is joined with Westmeston.

== Landmarks ==
Clayton to Offham Escarpment is a Site of Special Scientific Interest, which stretches from Hassocks in the west and passes through many parishes including Streat, to Lewes in the east. The site is of biological importance due to its rare chalk grassland habitat along with its woodland and scrub.

== History ==
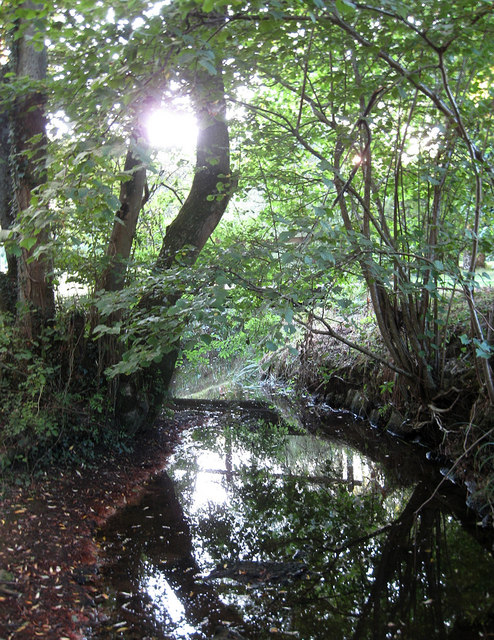
Bevern Stream

There is a lot of evidence of human activity, such as flint digging, working and cooking during the Atlantic period around seven thousand years ago. Archaeologists have suggested that forest clearances may have started earlier on the thinner soils of the Lower Greensand in places such as Streat, where flint tools from the period can be found in abundance.

As is true in most of the Weald, Medieval Streat had much common land for people to graze their animals, make hay and garner other resources. A quarter of the common was ploughed up in 1258. Much later, between 1600 and 1684, the rest of the main commons of Streat were enclosed. Before its nineteenth century enclosure there was a third arm to Streat Green which tracked south through Riddens Wood (TQ 358 170) down to Riddens Farm, by the railway line. The braided paths can still be made out in the wood. It used to be called "Chinese Wood" because there was a Chinese temple there. The temple is now gone, but its existence explains the presence of bamboo and other exotic plants in the wood, alongside the sessile oak, gean, hornbeam and a wild service tree on the western boundary still bears seasonal fruits. Now all that is left of the Commons are the two Streat greens, Streat Lane Green and Shergold's Farm Green, only parts of which are registered as common land, but remain open and public areas.

The Lower Greensand ridge is cut deep by the old swine pasture droves. Streat Lane itself is an example of such an ancient droveway, used by villagers to seasonally move their livestock and crops. The partial survival of archaic pasture vegetation on the linear greens gives evidence of this history.

== Notable buildings and areas ==
Notable areas around Streat

Streat is a thin parish that stretches from Wivelsfield parish in the north to Falmer in the South Downs. It is squashed between Plumpton to the east and Westmeston to the west. For nearly two miles north of the Downs, Streat Lane is narrow and winding, sufficiently traffic free to make walking possible with care, with tall nutty hedgerows on either side.

=== Roman roads ===
It was forgotten for many centuries that Streat owed its name to the presence of a Roman road that cuts through the parish (Anglo-Saxon place names containing "Street", "Streat" or "Stret", usually indicate a Roman road). This road was re-discovered less than a century ago, and came to be known as the Sussex Greensand Way, though it is difficult to detect as it crosses Streat parish. There is also a north-south Roman or Romanised Celtic road known as the Middleton Track just over the west parish boundary border at Hayleigh Farm sweeping past Middleton Manor which ascends the South Downs escarpment passing above the Victoria Jubilee Middleton Plantation

=== Streat greens ===
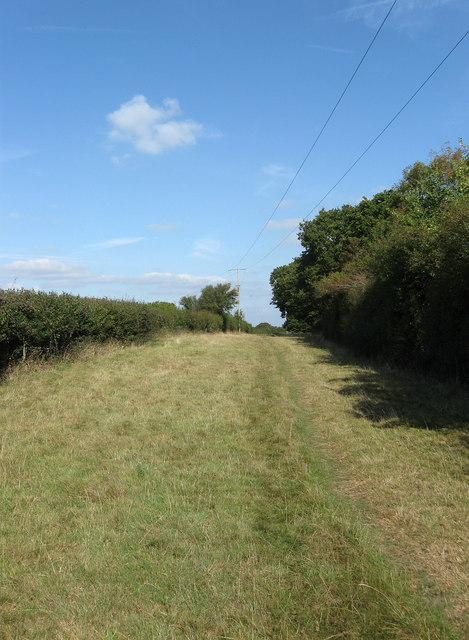
Green Lane

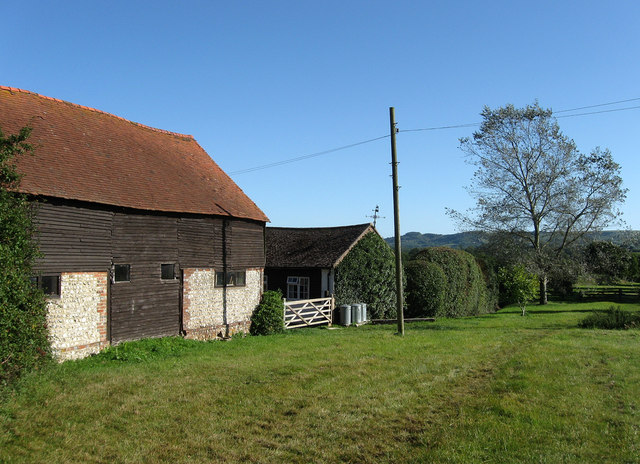
Shergolds Farm

Although most of the Streat greens are no longer registered as common land, their boundaries still exist. The western arm, Streat Lane Green (TQ 352 167), is owned by the parish council, but is managed by the residents backing on to each section. Parts are managed sensitively for wildlife, but others are over-mown like suburban lawns, and the flowers and grasses get no chance to set seed or attract butterflies and bees (2016). Some parts are lost to thick thorn scrub, making it difficult to envisage the green as a unitary habitat. Some areas do still have archaic and rare species such as adder's tongue fern and there is a fine three span oak south of the railway, hidden on the east side boundary bank (TQ 351 164). One sensitively managed area has pepper saxifrage and stone parsley. Where the sward is allowed to flower it is very colourful, with clovers and vetches, knapweed, fleabane, oxeye daisy, bird's foot trefoil, meadowsweet, agrimony, burnet saxifrage and wild carrot.

The eastern arm, Shergold's Farm Green, (TQ 356 165) is well-managed for nature and much is owed to the owner of Shergolds Farm who has loved and preserved the farm's conservation features. David Bangs, a Sussex field naturalist, describes the area as "A green lane that magics you right back to the medieval drovers' roads, meandering between thick hedgerows over uneven, damp or dry ground. Strawberry clover was the thing that first caught my eye, with its fruits like frosted strawberries. It is common along one length. There's spiny restharrow too, and scattered pepper saxifrage and stone parsley. At its southern end, by the railway, the Green crosses the Bevern Stream with thick thorn on either side. Listen out for nightingales in spring".

=== Woods ===
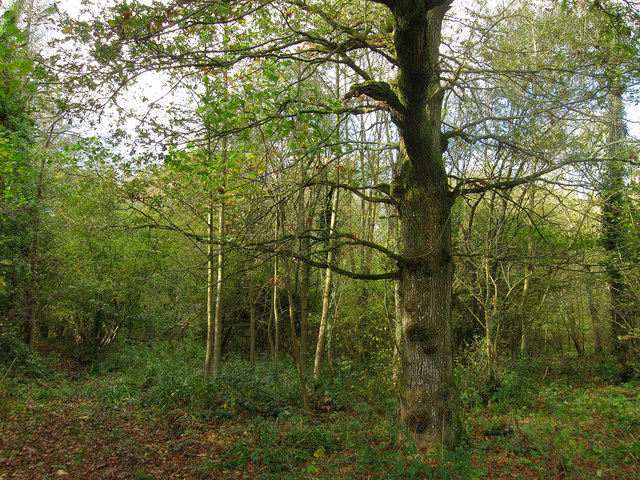
Brocks Wood

The woods in the parish are species-rich. Brocks Wood (TQ 349 143) is a bluebell wood with a stream. Dean's Wood (around TQ 353 169) is on the western side of Shergold's Farm, and is similar with sessile oak, gean and hornbeam. Plumpton Wood is on the parish boundary (TQ 355 145) the western edge that borders Streat has big oaks, a big old ash, a gean swarm, wild service and pignut.

=== Streat church ===
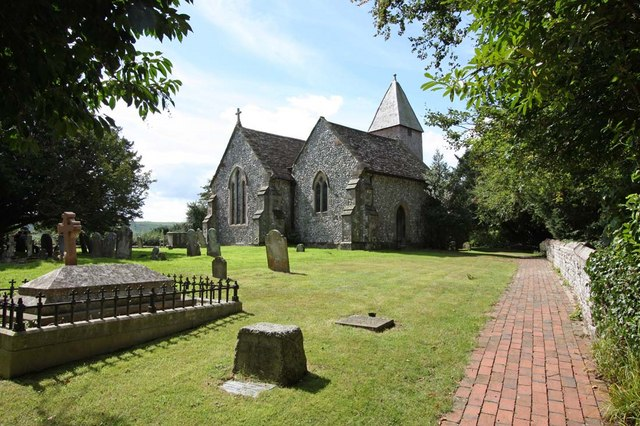
Streat Parish Church

The Streat church (TQ 350 151) commands grand views from the greensand ridge. It has two cast iron grave slabs, likely mined from the Wadhurst Clay in nearby the mine ore pits, in the church aisle, commemorating an 18th century Wadhurst iron master's family. Nearby north of the church and west of Streat Lane the footpath bisects one of a cluster of unimproved meadows (TQ 349 157) that has many archaic meadow species including sneezewort, pepper saxifrage, oxeye daisy and in summer lots of marbled white butterflies (2013). On Streat Lane near the church the ancient forest specialist Bechstein's and barbastelle bats can be seen flying at twilight.

=== Bevern stream ===
The Bevern Stream's clean and clear waters flow through this parish and support trout, bullhead, minnows, freshwater mussels and caddisflies. Its banks are carpeted with violets, bluebells and ramsons. There are tussocky brook meadows with thick hedgerows and a relict marshy flora that is rich in wildlife.

=== Old Rectory ===
There is an Old Rectory, a listed building, which may indicate the existence of chancel repair liability to any lay improprietors of land which was once belonged to the church.

=== Streat Place ===
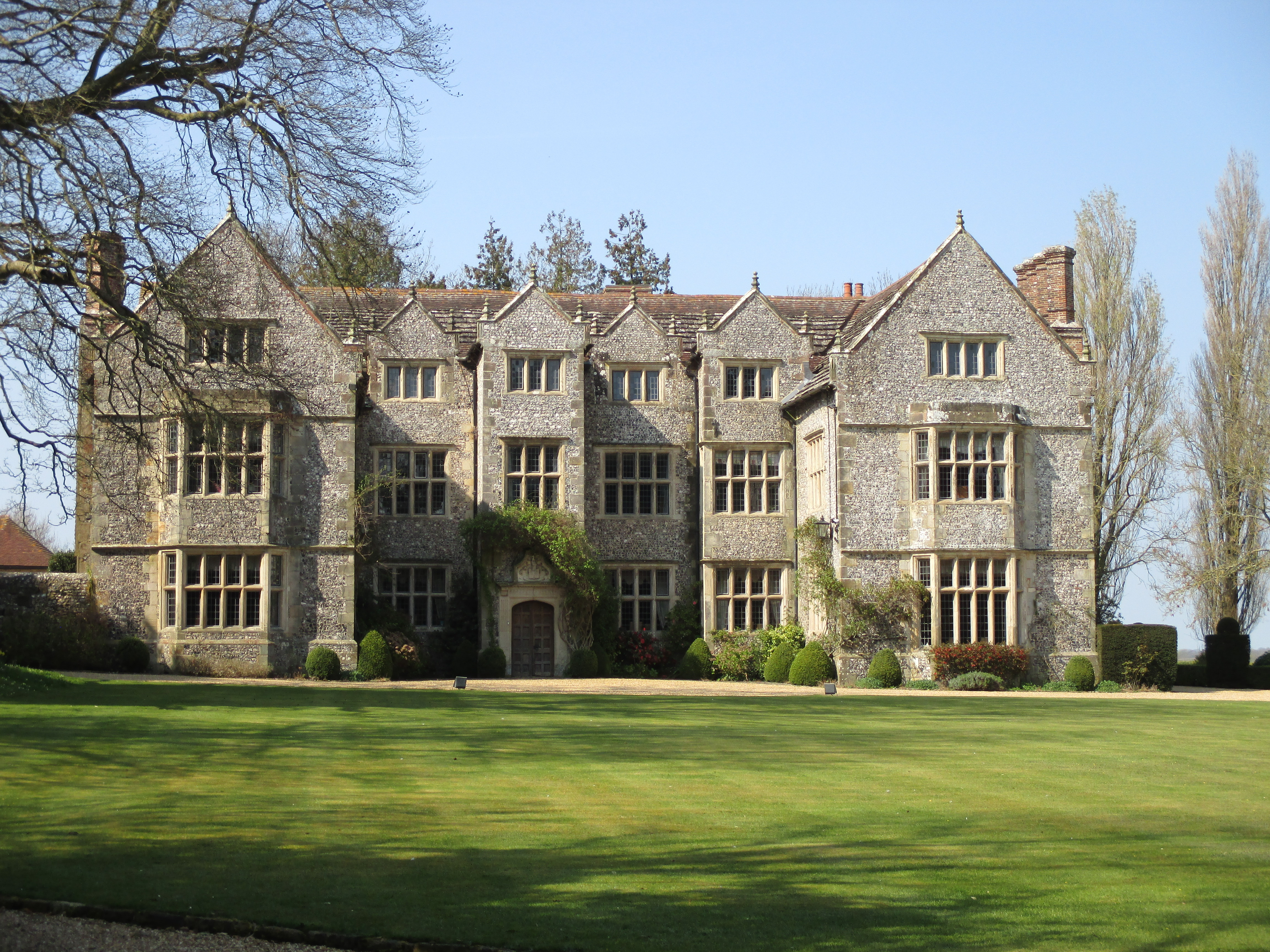
East aspect of Streat Place

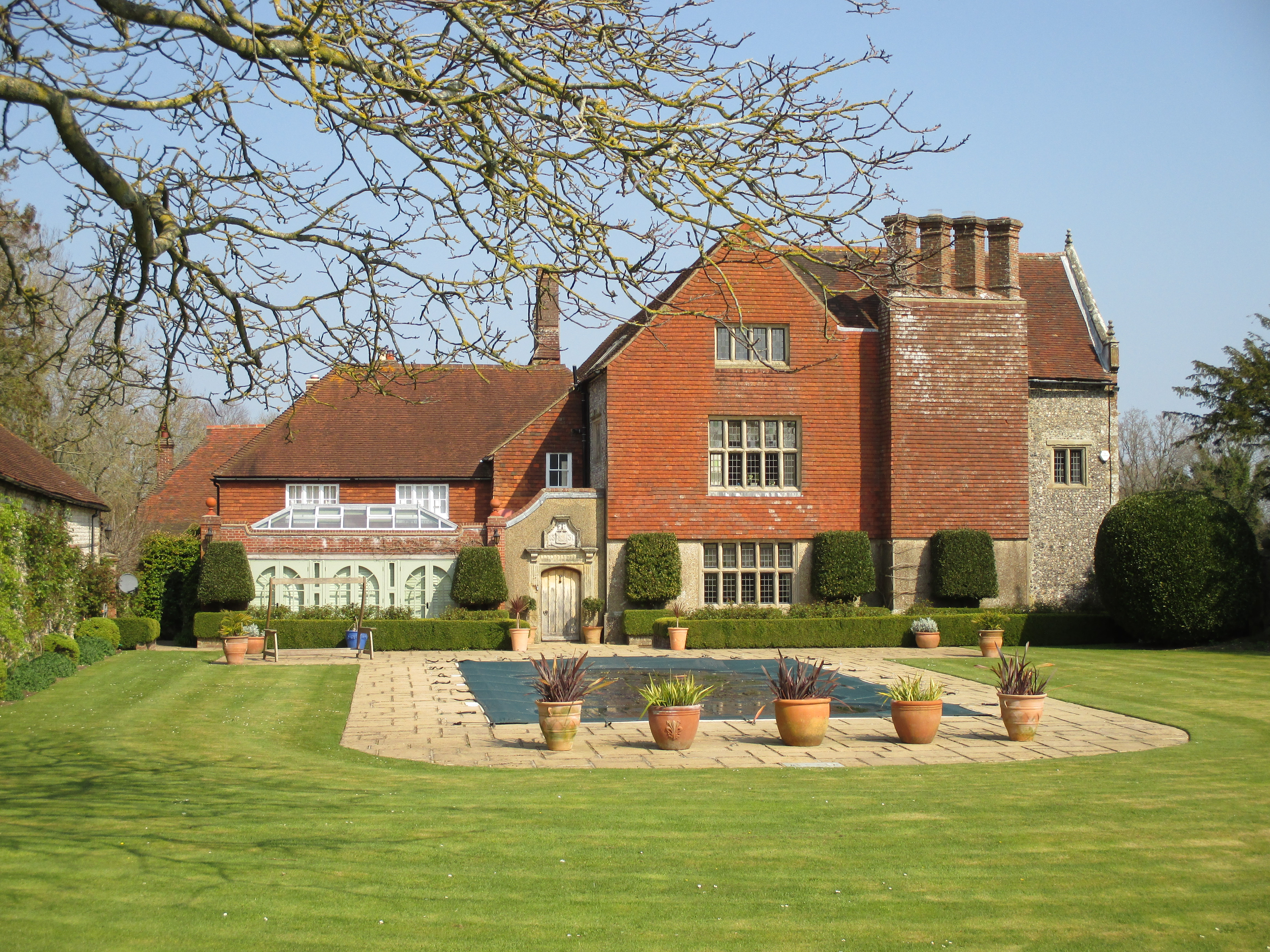
South aspect of Streat Place

Streat Place is a manor house built in the early 17th century, next to the church, by Walter Dobell who died in 1624. It is a huge Jacobean mansion of flint, with stone details and a Horsham stone roof. In an otherwise modest place such as Streat, this upmarket manor house seems rather incongruous and perhaps it is not surprising that it was let as a farmhouse for a long time. The building has an E-shaped plan with central porch and projecting wings. Its national listing gives it as Grade II* and reveals its architectural merit as including its entire facing of knapped flints with long and short ashlar quoins to each window bay.

=== Blackberry Wood Campsite ===
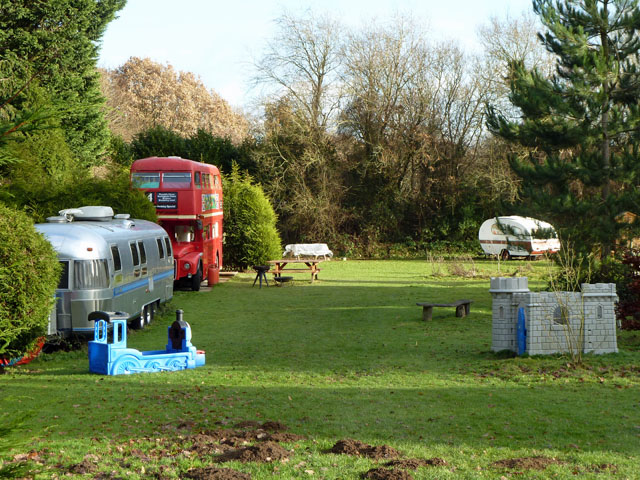
Blackberry Wood campsite

Blackberry Wood Campsite (TQ 351 147) is a campsite known for quirky architecture and buildings to stay in, including treehouses and a helicopter. It has an American diner, a gipsy caravan, a London bus, and there is a stream side with fallen trees across and tree swings.

=== Streat Hill ===
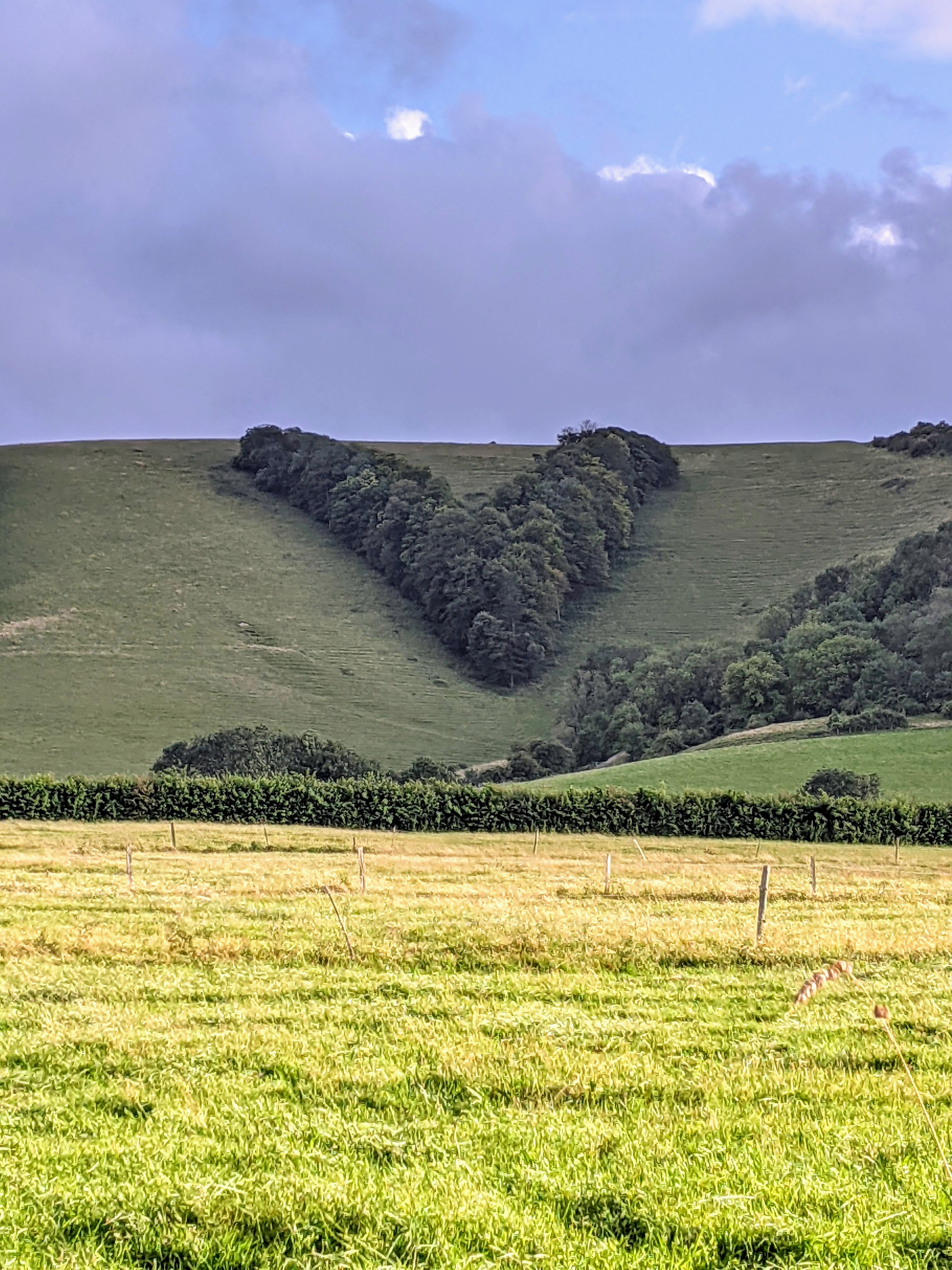
The Jubilee plantation was planted on Streat Hill to mark Queen Victoria's Silver Jubilee

The parish reaches its highest point at the top of Streat Hill where it rises to 224m above sea level. There are two tumuli or bowl barrows, though they are scarcely visible. They have been termed by archaeologists the Western Brow round barrow cemetery.

Over the course of several centuries, much traffic has surrounded the hill between the coast and the deep Weald. The herds of swine, cattle, sheep, and other forms of livestock that have traversed up and down Streat Hill over the centuries has formed a deep and steep, zig-zagging bostal track. Wayfaring Tree, which one may find across the steep slopes, is host to the scarce and jewel-like orange-tailed clearwing moth, whose caterpillars burrow into the branches. Streat Hill bostal and scarp slope (TQ 351 130) has long been ungrazed, and has consequently lost most of its ancient species-rich chalk grassland to invasive scrub. Only islands of that very rich turf remain on the bostal's deep cut sides. It has green hairstreak, dingy skipper and wall brown butterflies. There are purple bar, black pyrausta and burnet companion day flying moths. The soft turf has the characteristic chalk grassland moss species Bubble Wrap Moss, Neckera crispa, Slender Comb Moss, Ctenidium molluscum, and Broom Fork Moss, Dicranum scoparium.

=== Jubilee plantation ===
To the west of the Streat Hill bostal there is the Queen Victoria Jubilee plantation (TQ 348 130), which forms the sign of a V on the middle of the bare scarp slope. Six species were planted in 1887 to mark Queen Victoria's Golden Jubilee, including pine.

== Governance ==
Streat lies within the Chailey ward for the East Sussex County Council tier of government. The ward also includes Chailey itself, Ditchling, East Chiltington, Newick, St John Without, Plumpton, Westmeston and Wivelsfield.

Streat is served by Lewes District Council and is covered by Plumpton, Streat, East Chiltington and St John Without ward which returns a single seat. At the 2011 census the population for this area was only 2,276.

The UK Parliament constituency for Streat is Lewes.
