= Blackcap, East Sussex =

Hill in East Sussex, England

Coordinates: 50°53′23″N 0°2′52″W

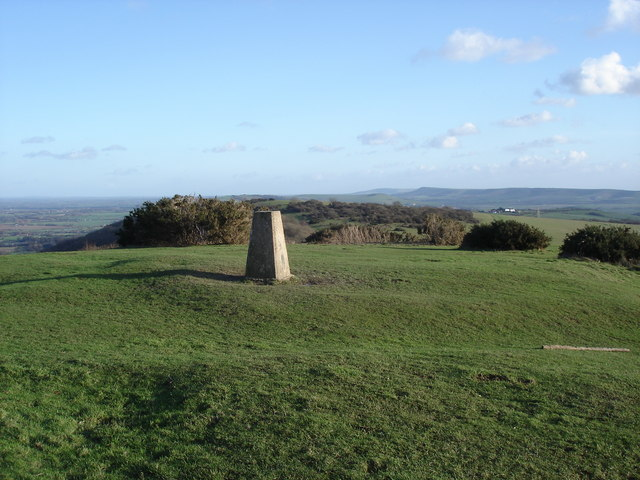
The peak of Blackcap

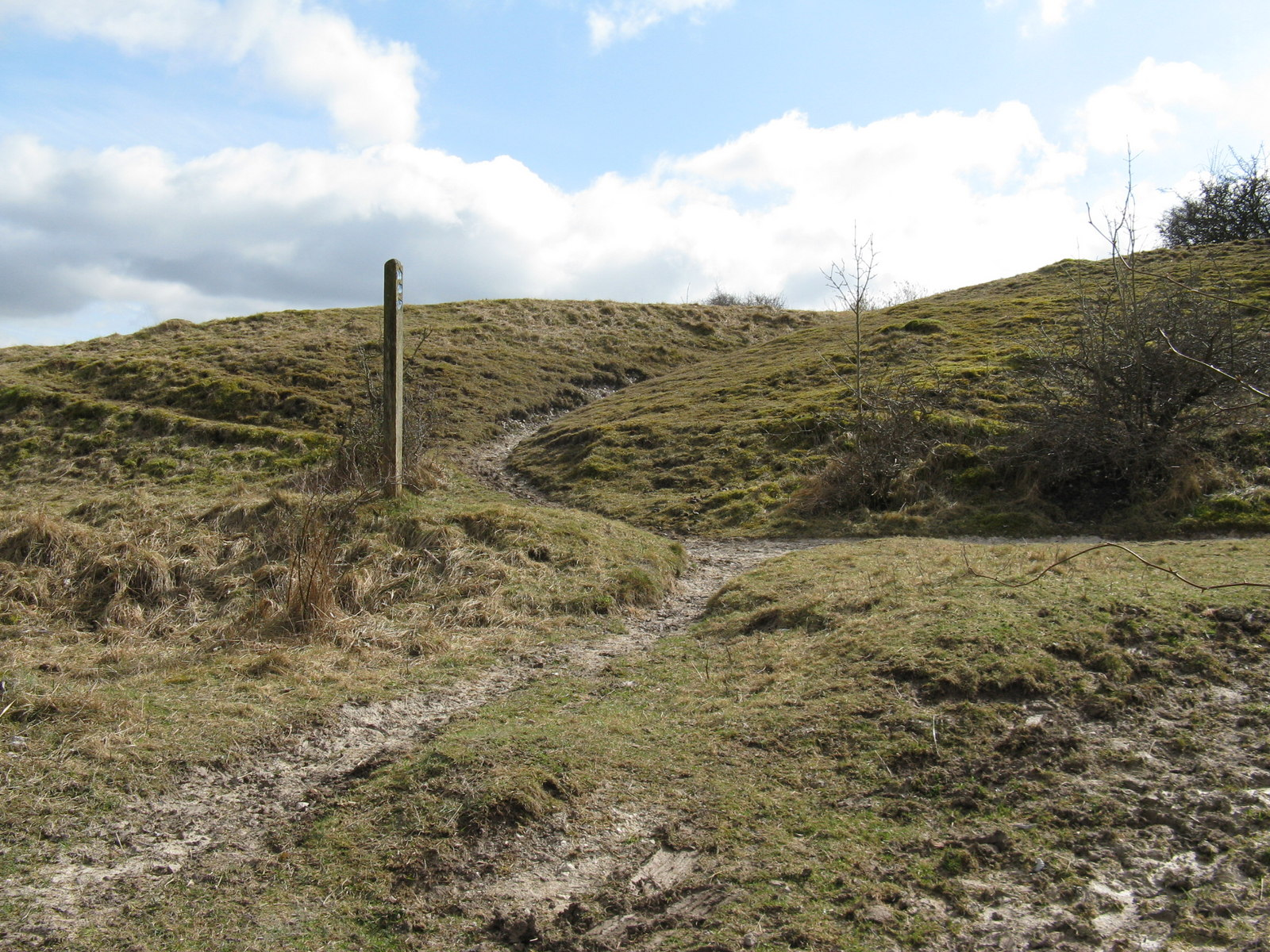
Bridleway crossing on the slope of Blackcap - geograph.org.uk - 1769476

Blackcap is a hill and nature reserve in East Sussex, England. It is on a peak of the South Downs, just south east of Plumpton and west of Lewes. The flatter landscape is made up of open ground with chalk paths, surrounded by thickets. The steeper ground leading up to the ridge is low-density woodland. The top is more open, with patches of pine woodland and gorse bushes.

Blackcap is part of the Clayton to Offham Escarpment SSSI, and has been owned by the National Trust since 1993. Because of the height of the hill at 206 metres (676 ft), the top of Blackcap was largely spared the farmers' plough and the ground has not been "improved" for monoculture crop fields as much as the rest of Downs were after the Second World War. Unimproved chalk downland is internationally rare and hosts archaic plants and rich biodiversity. As a result, this is an important area on the South Downs. The brow of Blackcap is still described by David Bangs as an area where "Crows caw, Jackdaws squark, clouds pass, peace still reigns in this old-fashioned place".

The hilltop, which has a triangulation point, offers some far-reaching and impressive views: Ashdown Forest northwards, Mount Caburn, Windover Hill (home of the Long Man), Firle Beacon, Seaford Head, Newhaven’s Rushy Hill, Kingston Hill, Hollingbury Hillfort, and Brighton’s high-rise towers.

== History ==
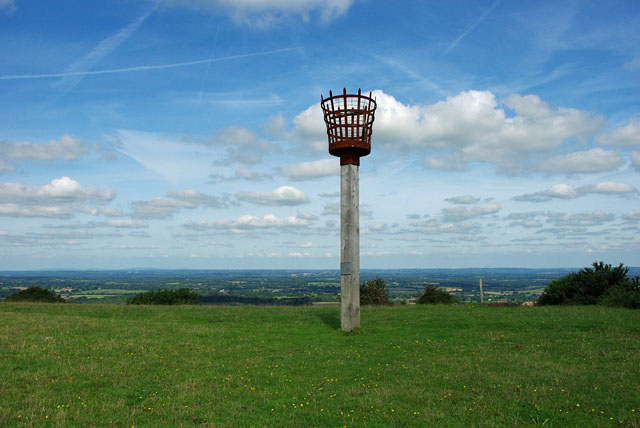
Beacon on Mount Harry - geograph.org.uk - 2045198

The original name of Blackcap appears to have been Mount Harry, while the hill now known as Mount Harry was called Lewes Beacon. The name probably indicates that it was used as a pagan shrine, or hearg, in early Saxon times, like the Harrow Hills in West Sussex and Middlesex, though the name was only recorded in 1610. Others have speculated that Mount Harry, then Mountharry, was named after King Henry III as it was here that Henry III was defeated by the troops of Simon de Montfort in 1264 at the Battle of Lewes. This seems less likely though.

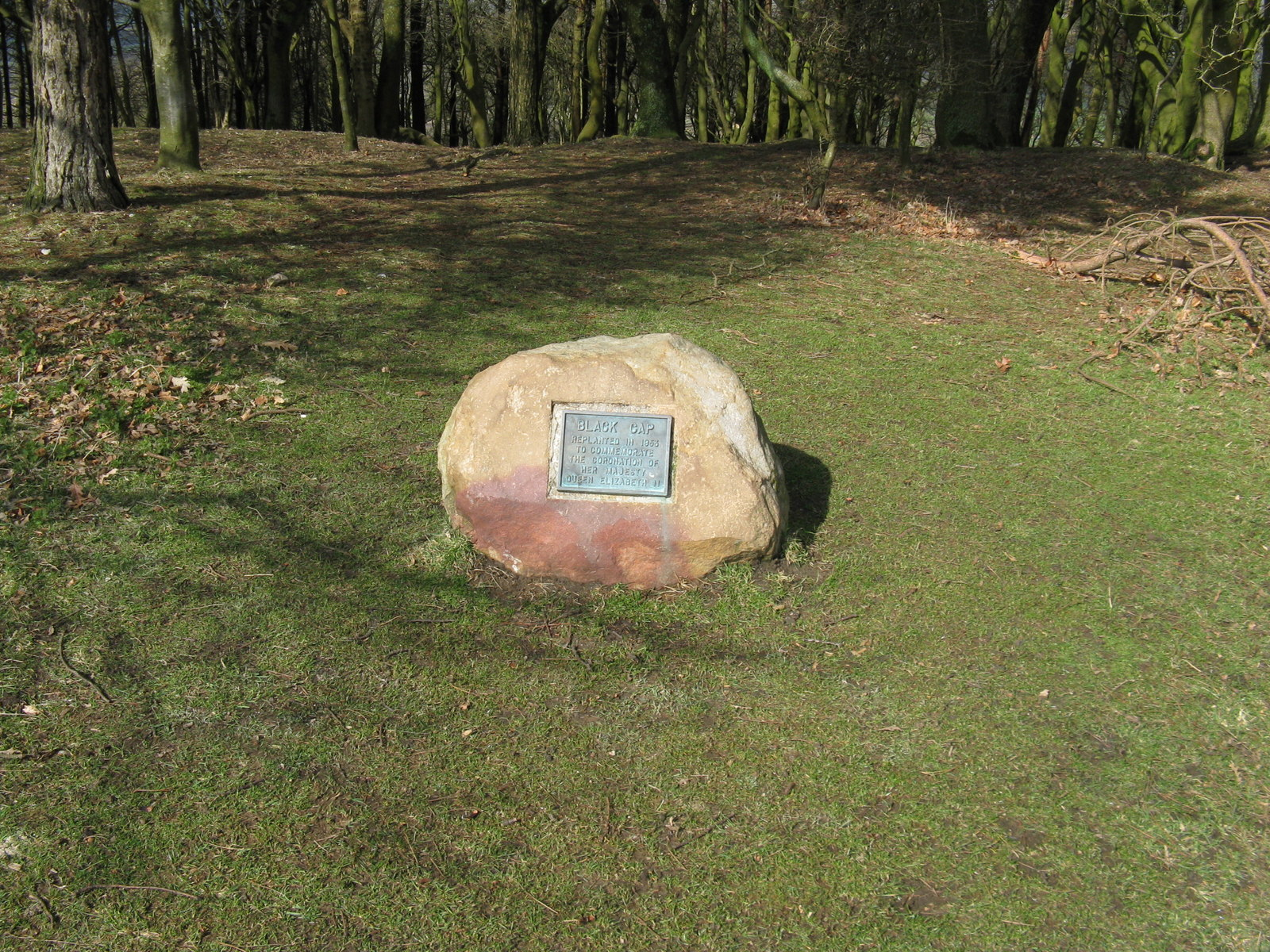
Plaque on Blackcap - geograph.org.uk - 1770519

In the 1830s a copse of trees was planted on top of Blackcap either to celebrate the coronation of a new queen, Victoria, or, as folklore would have it, as a guide for smugglers. More trees were planted to commemorate the coronation of Queen Elizabeth II and a plaque has been erected.

Between Blackcap and Mount Harry there is a dip where Black Cap Mill used to sit. It is unknown whether the name Blackcap came from the black roof of the mill or the name from the adjacent summit.

There are ancient twelve smallish, round pre-historic "barrows" next to the top of the Warningore Bostal (grid reference TQ 375 127). Barrows are called ‘tumuli’ on most maps in the UK, but ‘barrows’ by archaeologists. The archaeologists’ name is nearer to their old folk name of ‘burghs’, which comes from the Saxon ‘beorgh’, meaning rounded hill.

== Biodiversity ==
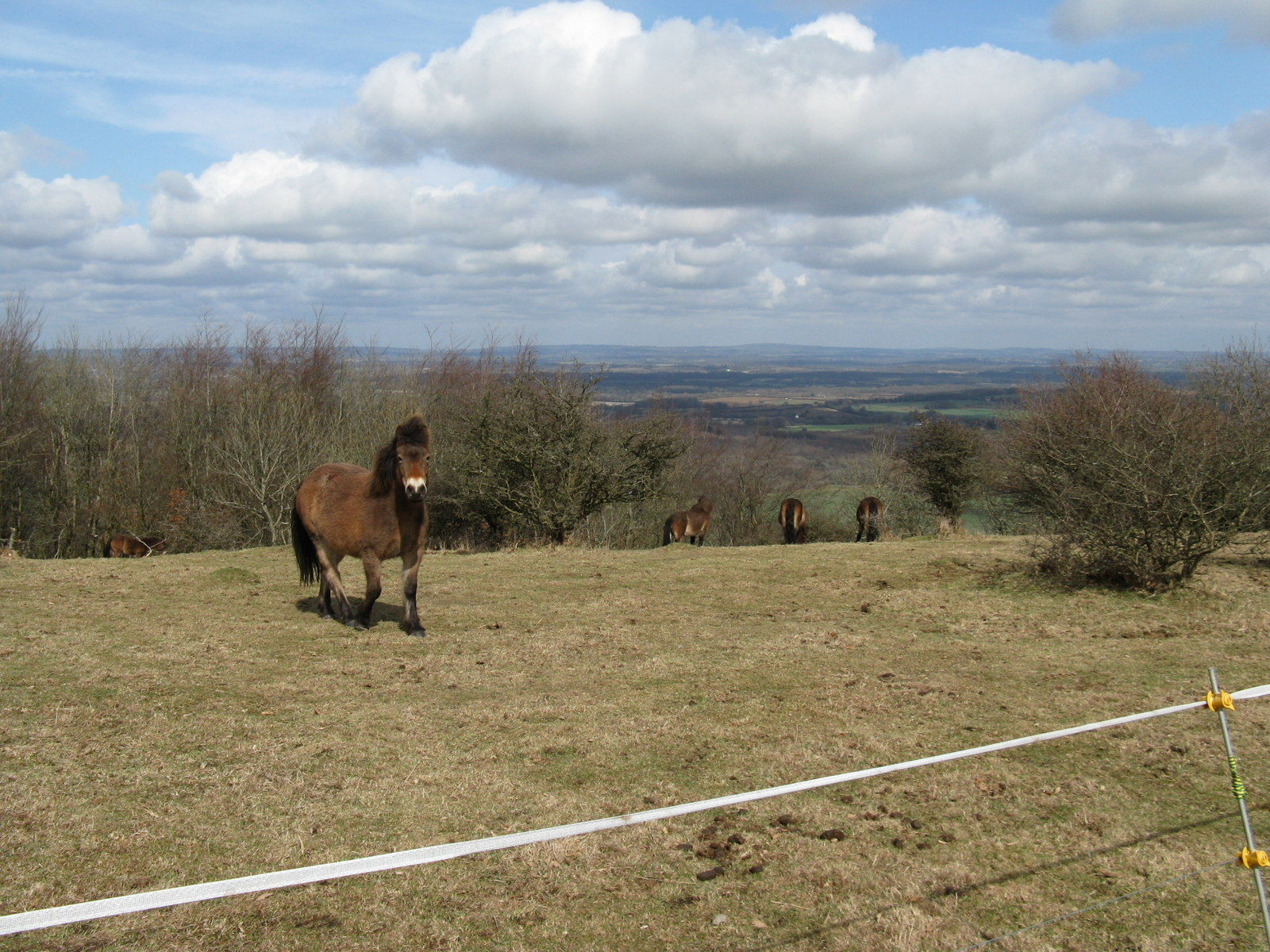
Ponies a long way from home - geograph.org.uk - 1770528

The scarp top still retains some rich ancient grassland fragments, especially where the slope begins to tip northwards. At least twenty-one old meadow species have been counted here and there are tiny fragments of heathy grassland. Many chalk loving species including wild flowering marjoram, butterflies and insects frequent the area. There are also areas of waxcap fungi, which include meadow, crimson and scarlet waxcap, together with many smaller waxcap species and scatters of earth tongues and clumps of fairy club. In some years, the strange, yellow bird’s-nest orchid has been found here as well as frog and bee orchids.

As is the case over the entire Downs, the rich biodiversity is present where there is heavy grazing. Blackcap was once well-populated by rabbits and hence the short grass used to be heavily grazed, but myxomatosis has wreaked havoc on rabbit populations. The decline in rabbits has had knock on effects on the species that can live in the area. For example, the grayling butterfly have not been seen there since the late 20th century.

In order to keep the scrub under control, the National Trust graze the top area using sheep and Exmoor ponies for the tougher plants. However, the area and particularly the lower grasslands are still under-grazed, meaning much of the scarp slope between Blackcap and Mount Harry is still invaded by scrub. Consequently, grayling and other species that used to frequent this rich, biodiverse chalk downland area still have not returned despite National Trust management and the lower slope pastures are separated from the crest by large thickets making access both along and up the slope difficult unless you're on a path

== Surrounding area ==
The National Trust reserve contains the hills of Blackcap in the parish of East Chiltington, Mount Harry 196 metres (643 ft) in the parish of Hamsey, the wooded area of Ashcombe Bottom in the parish of St John Without and the Clayton to Offham Escarpment that runs down to the Sussex Weald to the north.
