= St John Without =

Parish in East Sussex, England

Coordinates: 50.91°N 0.03°W

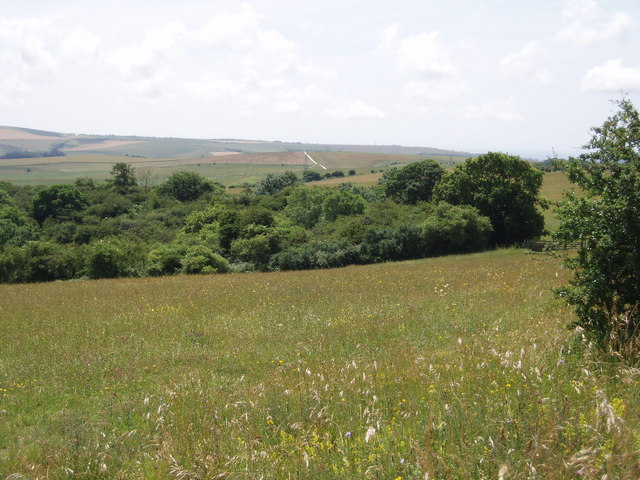
- Ashcombe Bottom

- Location within East Sussex
- Area: 3.84 km^{2} (1.48 sq mi)
- Population: 54 (Electors-2004)
  - Density: 36/sq mi (14/km^{2})
- OS grid reference: TQ387138
  - London: 41 miles (66 km) North
- Civil parish: St John Without
- District: Lewes
- Shire county: East Sussex
- Region: South East
- Country: England
- Sovereign state: United Kingdom
- Post town: LEWES
- Postcode district: BN7
- Dialling code: 01273
- Police: Sussex
- Fire: East Sussex
- Ambulance: South East Coast
- UK Parliament: Lewes

St John Without is a small civil parish in the Lewes District of East Sussex, England, covering an area to the north-west of the town of Lewes.

Much like its sister parish, St Ann Without, the parish was formed in 1894 as Lewes St John Without from the part of the ancient parish of Lewes St John outside (that is, 'without', as opposed to 'within') the borough of Lewes. From 1894 to 1974 it was in the rural district of Chailey. The shape of the parish, like many of the parishes north of the Sussex Downs in this area is long and thin (see link to the parish map in the External links section below).

The parish includes the small hamlet of Chiltington and a few dispersed farms and houses along Allington Road to the foot of the South Downs.

== Landmarks ==
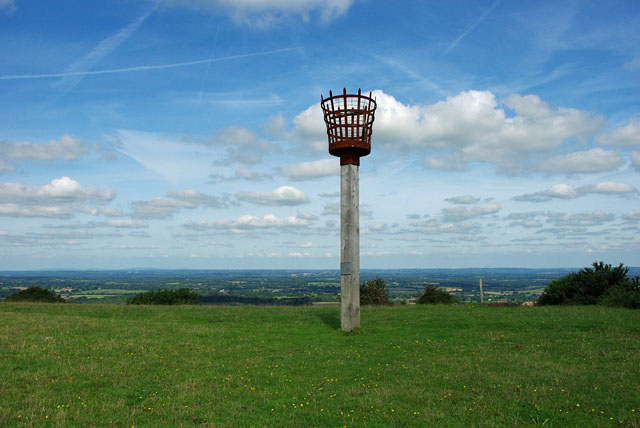
Beacon on Mount Harry

Clayton to Offham Escarpment is a Site of Special Scientific Interest, which stretches from Hassocks in the west and passes through many parishes including St John Without, to Lewes in the east. The site is of biological importance due to its rare chalk grassland habitat along with its woodland and scrub.

Ashcombe Bottom is a wooded area in the south of the parish, which forms part of the National Trust Blackcap reserve. The reserve makes up a section of the Clayton to Offham Escarpment SSSI.

== Notable areas ==
Notable areas around St John Without

St John without is a parish squashed between East Chiltington to its east and Hamsey to its west. To its north is the Chailey parish and to the south, Falmer. Within its boundary is the ancient woodland of Warningore, the scarp top between Mount Harry and Blackcap, East Sussex and the valley of Ashcombe Bottom. The largest settlement is Chiltington. The Bevern streams runs along the northern boundary of the parish. On Allington Lane, there was the 150 acre Beechwood Common, which was enclosed by 1584. The Sussex Greensand Way, a Roman road, runs through the top of the parish.

=== Wickham Wood ===
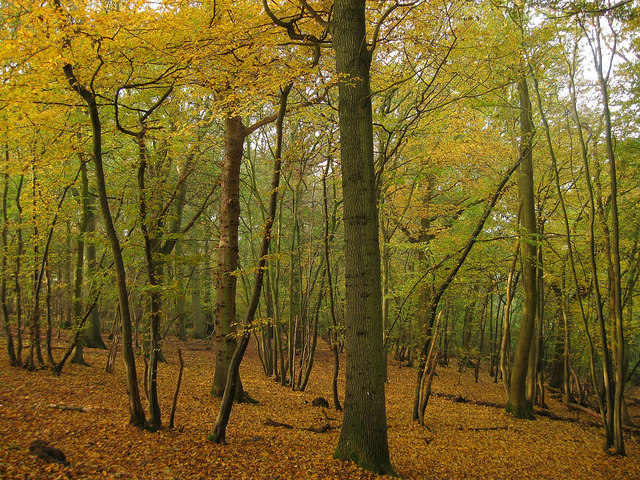
Wickham Wood - geograph.org.uk - 1562196

Wickham Wood (TQ 390 156) lies to the south of the Bevern stream at the northern most point of the parish and just north of the Roman Greensand Way road. Its name is likely to derive from Latin. Wickham (as in vicus) indicates a small Roman settlement and the woodland.

The woodland is carpeted with wild garlic and occasionally frequented by beautiful lime longhorn beetle that come from the line of lime trees at Hurst Barns in the neighbouring East Chiltington parish.

=== Warningore Wood ===
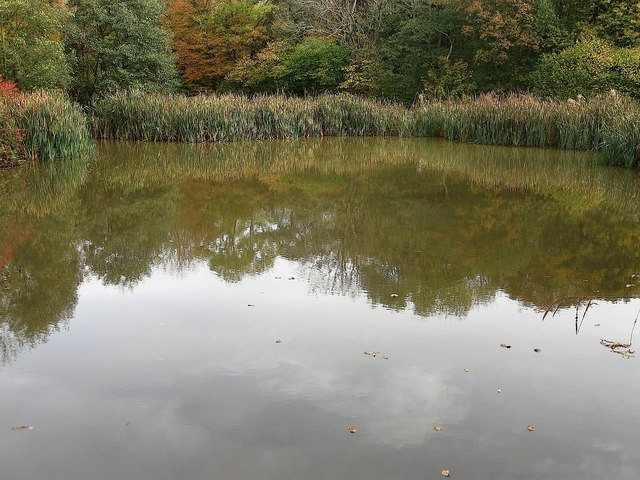
Pond, Warningore Wood - geograph.org.uk - 1563080

Warningore Wood (TQ 382 140) spans the East Chiltington and St John Without parish. It is a big wood that stands on sticky Gault Clay. It has up to 25 ancient woodland indicator species, including early purple and butterfly orchids. It mainly consists of hornbeam trees, but there is also wych elm, wild service, crab apple, spindle, guelder rose and aspen.

=== Ashcombe Bottom ===
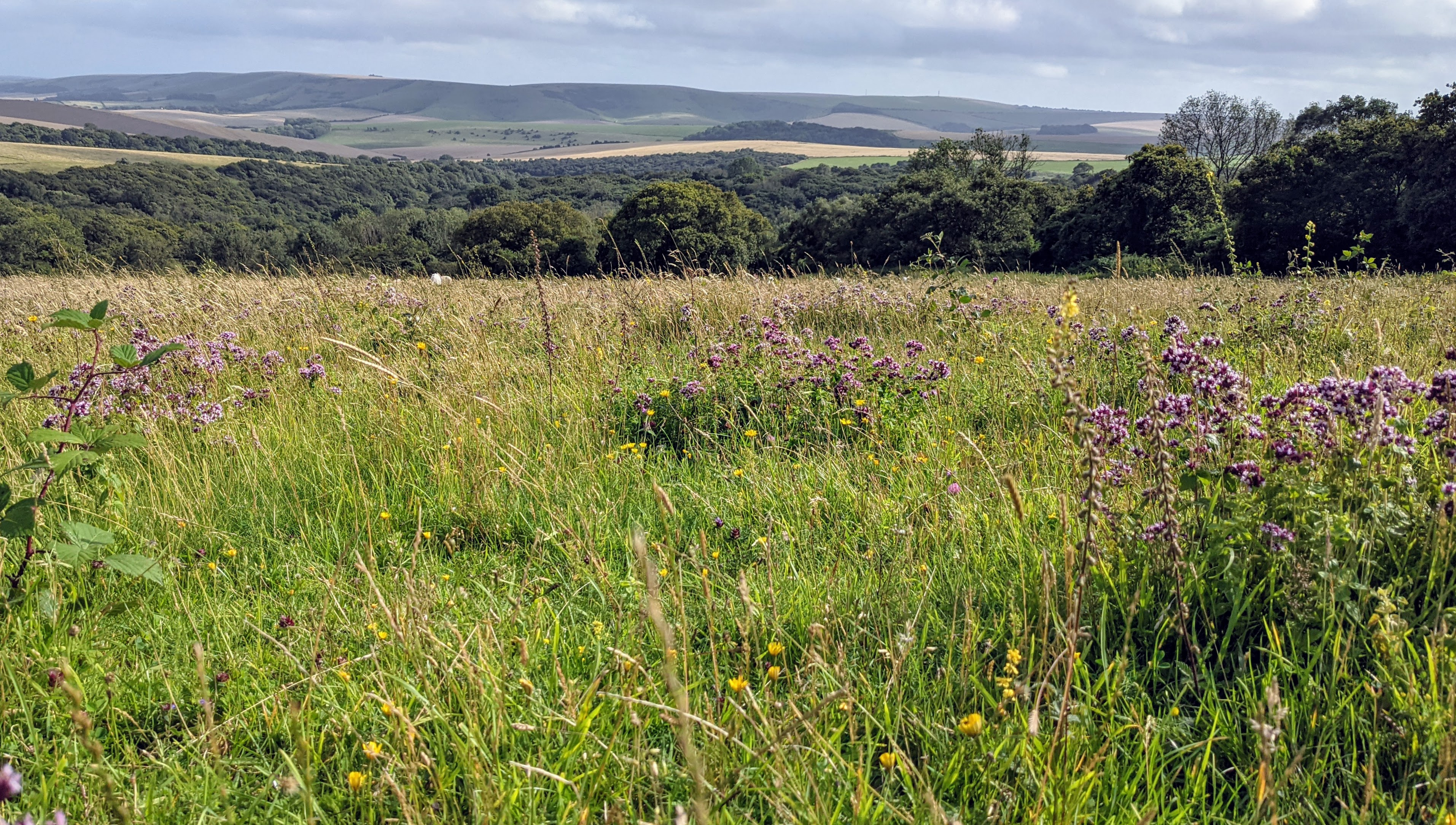
Blackcap's meadow above Ashcombe Bottom East.jpg

Ashcombe Bottom (TQ 373 118) is a woodland valley that runs south from Blackcap that has been owned by the National Trust since 1993 with Blackcap, Mount Harry and most of the scarp. It is rich in scrubland species and has bryony, rosebay willowherb, spindle, honeysuckle and occasional wood sage. The ash which is being managed for ash dieback. It is a biodiverse area with many butterflies and migrant birds in spring.

== Governance ==
St John Without is governed at local level by a parish meeting. A merger with East Chiltington parish council has been suggested, although no formal plans have been made.

The next level of government is Lewes District Council. The District council supplies services such as refuse collection, planning consent, leisure amenities and council tax collection. St John Without is covered by the Plumpton, Streat, East Chiltington and St John (Without) ward which returns a single seat. In the May 2007 election, a councillor from the local Liberal Democrat party was elected.

St John Without lies within the Chailey ward for the next tier of government, East Sussex County Council. The ward also includes Chailey, Ditchling, East Chiltington, Newick, Plumpton, Streat, Westmeston and Wivelsfield. The County Council provides services such as roads and transport, social services, libraries and trading standards.

St John Without is represented in the UK Parliament by the Lewes constituency. The current serving MP is the Liberal Democrat James MacCleary who won the seat in the 2024 general election.

Prior to Brexit in 2020, the village was represented by the South-East England constituency in the European Parliament.
