= Plumpton, East Sussex =

Village in East Sussex, England

Coordinates: 50.90°N 0.07°W

Plumpton
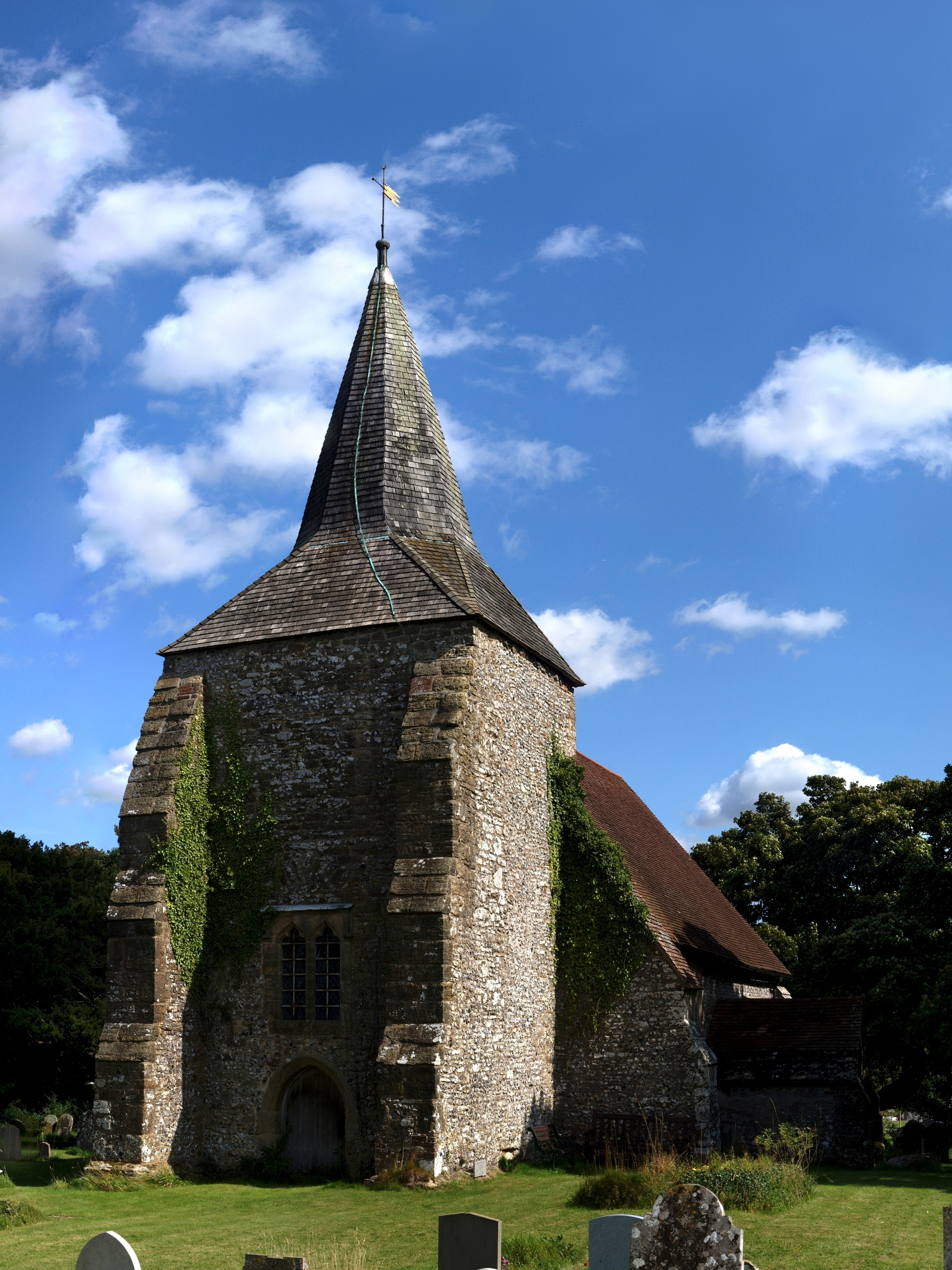
- Church of St Michael, Plumpton

- Flag

- Location within East Sussex
- Area: 9.7 km^{2} (3.7 sq mi)
- Population: 1,644 (Parish-2011)
  - Density: 450/sq mi (170/km^{2})
- OS grid reference: TQ359132
  - London: 41 miles (66 km) N
- District: Lewes
- Shire county: East Sussex
- Region: South East
- Country: England
- Sovereign state: United Kingdom
- Post town: LEWES
- Postcode district: BN7
- Dialling code: 01273
- Police: Sussex
- Fire: East Sussex
- Ambulance: South East Coast
- UK Parliament: Lewes
- Website: Plumpton Council

Plumpton is a village and civil parish in the Lewes District of East Sussex, England. The village is located 5 mi (8.0 km) north-west of Lewes. The parish measures 6.5 mi (10.5 km) in length on its north–south axis and 1 mi (1.6 km) at its widest on the B2116 Underhill Road. The southern half of the parish lies within the South Downs National Park and at the highest point, 214 m (702 ft), the South Downs Way traverses the crest of Plumpton Plain. The parish includes the small village of Plumpton adjacent to the Downs and to the north the larger village of Plumpton Green where most of the community and services are based. Plumpton is known for its racecourse, and also Plumpton College, which farms over 2,500 acres (1,000 ha) of land and has become one of the leading centres for land-based education in the UK.

Plumpton Green is rumoured to have been the inspiration for the popular 1960s British children's television series Trumpton by Gordon Murray, with nearby Chailey being Chigley and Wivelsfield Green being Camberwick Green.

== History ==
Plumpton is mentioned in the Domesday Book of 1086 as having a church and two mills, and is shown as Pluntune, meaning 'town or settlement where plum-trees grew'.

Simon de Montfort fought and defeated King Henry III at the Battle of Lewes in 1264. He gained a strategic advantage, and achieved complete surprise, by using a night march to position his numerically inferior army on Downland high above the town by early morning. To avoid detection they ascended the Downs four miles to the north-west of Lewes up Warningore Bostal, a deeply-worn track that exists to this day. Before marching on the town de Montfort is reputed to have rallied his forces, wearing large white crosses on their tunics for identification, on Plumpton Plain. Although now no longer in place, within living memory a sandstone block at the centre of the cross bore the inscription 'Battle of Lewes 1264'.

As in the medieval Sussex Weald generally, Plumpton parish and Plumpton's manorial outliers to the north (known as 'Plumpton Boscage') had huge amounts of common land. By 1596, 240 acres (97 ha) of Plumpton Common had been enclosed and divided, though Plumpton Green remained common land until 1842. There is little evidence now of the commons. Place names like 'Riddens' Farm and Wood and 'Inholmes' Farm indicate very ancient enclosures from the wild. The place name 'Lentridge' Farm perhaps denotes the more widespread ancient presence of small-leaved lime, which is rare now in the Weald. ('Lent' = 'lind', as in 'linden', lime). The scarce Wild Service Tree is occasionally present in the hedgerows.

Schooling began in 1837, where two teachers taught in a small building (measuring 22×16' – 6.7×4.9m) in the south of the parish in Plumpton village. This was the main centre of the parish population, which was then around 275, with some 20 children attending school.

The railway station was opened 1863, two miles to the north, and the centre of the parish gradually moved towards it. By the 1870s there were three drinking establishments, the village shop and a few other small businesses to the north of the station, spaced along Station Road. There were also a number of brickmaking sites in the open fields to either side of the road. Apart from brick-making and farming there were other rural activities such as bird-scaring, hare-coursing, acorn-picking, horse-driving, steeplechasing; even collecting flowers for the May Day celebrations.

The Elementary Education Act 1870 introduced compulsory education and during 1875 the newly formed Plumpton School Board approached a total of six local landowners to sell a half-acre plot for the building of the school. All refused. The threat of compulsory purchase finally procured, for £250, a corner of a meadow bordered by a stream 200m north of the railway and in 1877 building commenced on a large single schoolroom, surmounted by a prominent bell-tower, with adjoining three-bedroomed house for the schoolmaster. The parish population was about 400 at this time; the school was designed for 64 pupils, and opened in 1878. During the first few years absenteeism was very high as it was common for children to work from an early age.

The school functioned for almost a century, and was extended at least twice to accommodate the ever-increasing population. It was eventually superseded by the present school, which was built in 1974 at the end of Southdowns cul-de-sac, and provides education facilities for 150 pupils, ranging from the ages of 4 to 11 in seven educational years. The redundant old school building had a number of community uses and then became a private residence until, in the late 1980s, with the addition of three new cottages it was converted into a total of seven dwellings. The school bell, still intact in the tower, was presented to the new school, where it is prominently displayed in the courtyard. The adjoining schoolhouse was unaffected by this development, and remained unchanged.

== Landmarks ==
The Clayton to Offham Escarpment is a Site of Special Scientific Interest along the ridge and slopes of the South Downs. Stretching some 10 km from Hassocks in the west to Lewes in the east, it passes through several parishes including Plumpton. The site is of biological importance due to its rare chalk grassland habitat along with its woodland and scrub.

The most visible boundary of the South Downs National Park aligns with the southernmost access road to Plumpton Racecourse, which itself runs alongside the Sussex Greensand Way, the Roman Road that crossed the parish in an east–west direction.

== Notable buildings and areas ==
Notable areas around Plumpton

The parish of Plumpton comprises the top of the South Downs down the Clayton to Offham Escarpment to the Sussex Weald stretching north to the Wivelsfield and Chailey parish. To the east is East Chiltington, to its south Falmer and to its west is the Streat parish. Like all the parishes in this area that run north from the scarp slope of the South Downs it is long and thin.

=== Village layout ===
Plumpton Green is essentially a ribbon development immediately to the north of the railway station and is home to the school, the village shop, a church and two pubs. The main thoroughfare, Station Road, runs the length of the village, with several cul-de-sacs branching from it. The majority of the road is paved on one side only.

Chapel Road is a cul-de-sac with 24 houses. These are mostly semi-detached, with a small terrace of cottages built in 1900. Woodgate Meadow is a fairly recent development of large, detached houses on the site of a former brickyard. Westgate was built on farmland some years later (1995) incorporating mainly detached houses and also the new village hall and green.

Plumpton Lane, connecting Plumpton and Plumpton Green has, in recent years, received several small housing developments. The houses are of an attractive design, incorporating traditional red Sussex tile-hung walls.

Plumpton railway station is on the East Coastway Line and the railway crossing had the last manually operated gates in Sussex, until finally replaced by automatic gates in 2016. As of December 2010 it has had an hourly service in each direction, between Eastbourne, Hastings and Ore and London Victoria. Plumpton Racecourse is located between the two villages, immediately to the south of the railway. Meetings draw large crowds and on race days the population of Plumpton doubles and the rail service is supplemented with extra trains. Races are sometimes televised, bringing Plumpton to a much wider audience.

=== Notable buildings ===
There are a number of historic and notable buildings in the area.

==== Churches ====
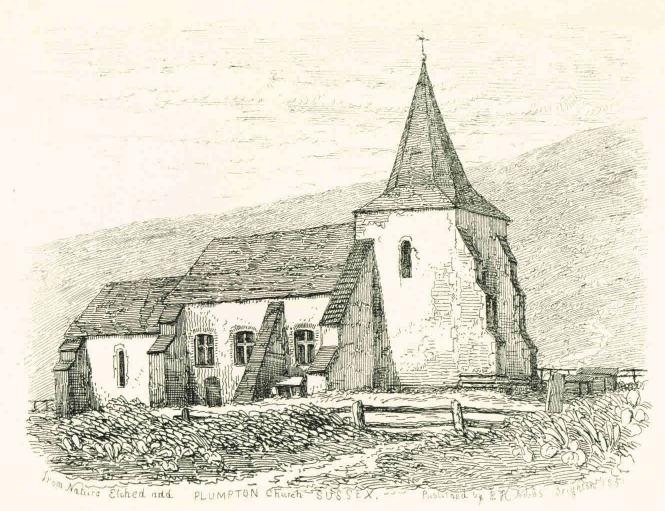
Plumpton Church, R. H. Nibbs

The naves of Plumpton church (TQ 356 134) and Westmeston church (TQ338 136) were built by the Normans, with later chancel and south aisle at Westmeston, and later tower and chancel at Plumpton. Stone buildings were exceptionally rare in those times hence their small size. Both of them had frescoes painted by the Lewes Group which were uncovered only in 1862, although those at Westmeston were not preserved. Parts of the paintings at Plumpton, on the north wall of the nave, do survive and have recently been restored. Extraordinarily, it is thought that the wooden bell-hanging frame may date back to 1040. The stone tower may have been built around the original wooden tower and its bell hanging. Plumpton church is surrounded by Plumpton College. Newly planted trees look to further obscure our view of it. The churchyard is currently badly maintained for meadow species.

In Plumpton Green stands All Saints Church (TQ 363 168). Archaic vegetation survives in the front churchyard and has lots of common spotted orchid amongst oxeye daisy, sorrel, bugle, meadow foxtail, ladies smock and thale cress. The larger yard at the back is often unkempt, and may have lost some value.

==== The Plough Inn ====
The pub was originally sited by Bower Farm but was relocated to the crossroads when the airfield was built in the second world war. There is a monument to the airmen by the pub.

Behind the Plough Inn is an archaic meadow, used as a campsite by the pub. It has old flowery sward, oxeye daisy, knapweed, fleabane, and even bits of saw wort, which the pub is commendably trying to manage (2015). In the autumn there are old meadow fungi such as cedarwood waxcap and fairy club. Unlike Worcestershire, where many pubs have old meadows attached to them, the Plough is special for maintaining its meadow, as this is not a strong Sussex tradition.

==== Plumpton College ====
Plumpton College is a Further and Higher education college with a variety of land-based courses, including Viticulture and Oenology, Agriculture, Horticulture, Floristry, Equine Studies, Animal Care and Veterinary Nursing, Countryside Management and so on.

==== Plumpton Place ====
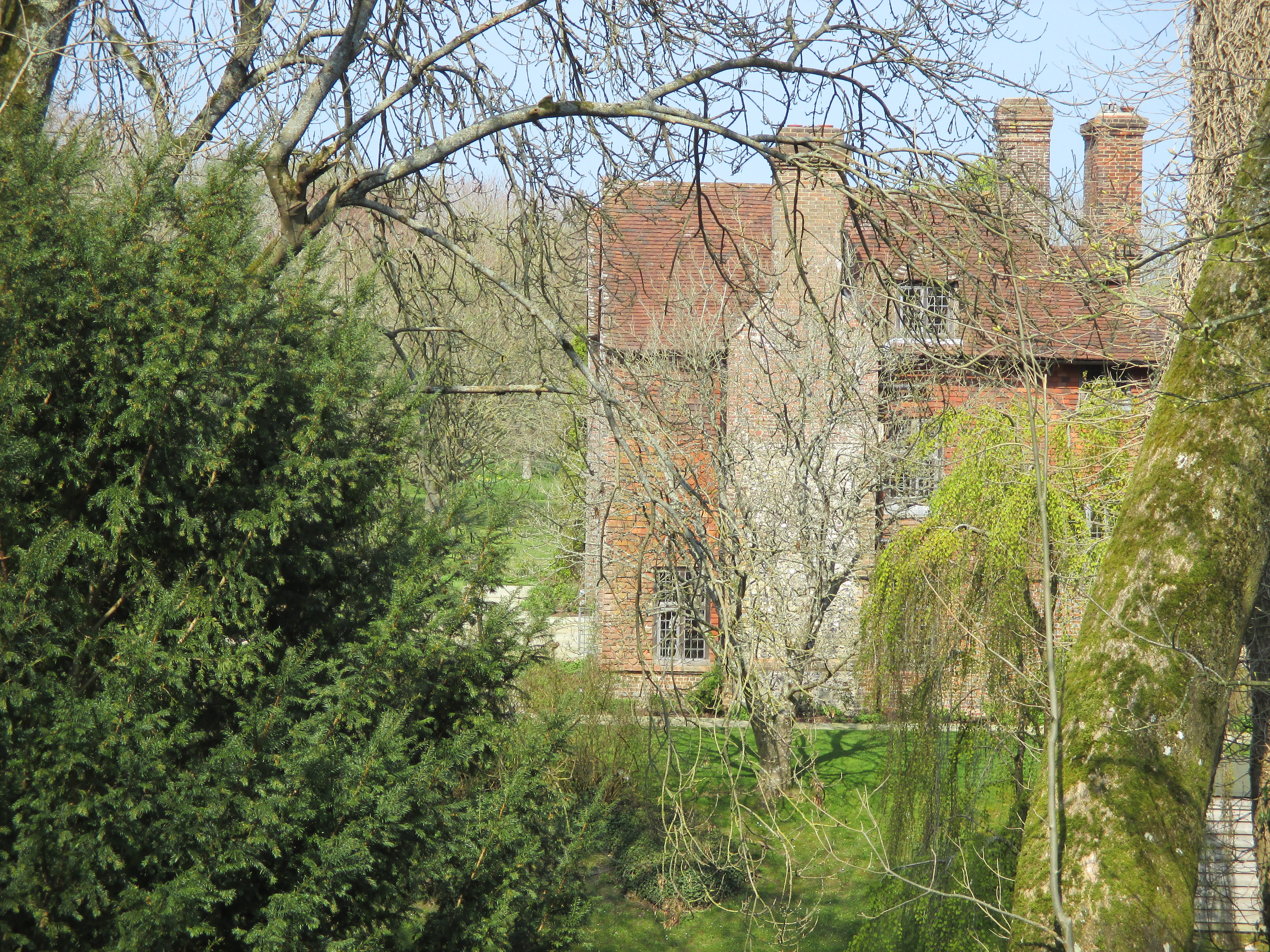
Plumpton Place

Plumpton Place stands next to Plumpton College. It is a six-bedroom manor house with a moat and water mill (TQ 361 136) which run into Plumton Mill stream. It had a big 17th century threshing barn, which is used by Plumpton College.

In the early 1970s, Led Zeppelin guitarist Jimmy Page purchased Plumpton Place, an Elizabethan manor, with 20th-century alterations by Sir Edwin Lutyens, surrounded by a moat and extensive gardens. With its relative proximity to Plumpton Racecourse, the grounds also include stables for horses. Page outfitted the manor with a recording studio and the credits for the Led Zeppelin album In Through the Out Door indicates that album mixing was carried out there. The manor can be seen briefly near the beginning of the Led Zeppelin concert film, The Song Remains the Same where the camera walks up to Page, playing a hurdy-gurdy, to inform him of the North American tour dates. Page sold the property in 1985.

==== Ashurst Farm ====
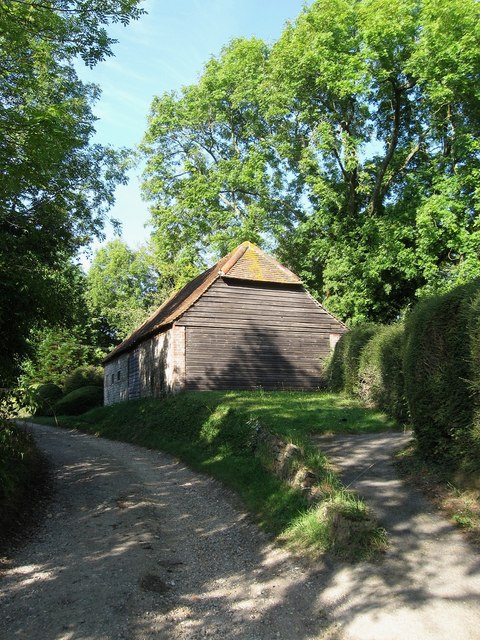
Flint Barn, Ashurst Lane

Ashurst Farm, by Plumpton Racecourse, has had an organic farm since 1994. Until then, the dairy cows had been hand-milked, and the land had received no artificial fertilisers since 1945, thus facilitating immediate organic status. The farm has a vegetable box scheme and employs much local labour.

=== Woodland ===
There are a number of beautiful and ancient woodland in this area.

==== Plumpton Wood (south) ====
The southern Plumpton Wood (TQ355 145) stands on wet Gault Clay and is a hazel coppice wood, with no hornbeam present. It is owned by Plumpton College and stands to its north. It has at least twenty-two archaic woodland indicator species. It has remarkably varied vegetation, which includes a thick bluebell carpet in springtime, oak and ash standards, a gean swarm, wild service and pignut. It has large damp areas with ramsons, redcurrant, and even alder buckthorn. The last pearl-bordered fritillary butterfly was seen in Plumpton Wood in 1982, but perhaps one day they will be reintroduced with the small pearl-bordered fritillary, both of which were a common sight in all Sussex woodlands before the 1980s.

==== Plumpton Wood (north) ====
The northern Plumpton Wood stands on Weald Clay (TQ 365 185) and is equally remarkable, although about 40% has been cleared in modern times and has chunks bitten out of it by houses and gardens. It is hornbeam coppice with far less hazel than the southern Plumpton Wood. There is wych elm and wild service, spurge laurel and midland thorn, and in 2011 green hellebore, birdsnest and greater butterfly orchids were recorded.

=== Streams ===
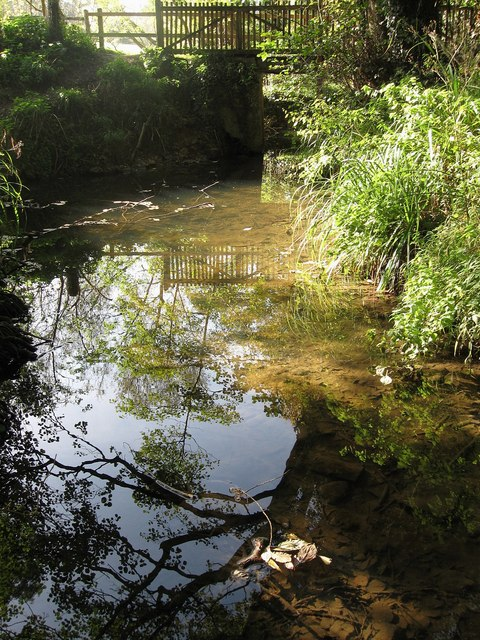
The Mill Stream

The Plumpton Mill Stream flows north through the parish, to join the Bevern Stream just north of the railway. In turn, the Bevern Stream flows into the River Ouse at Barcombe Mills. The streams and their banks are delightful green ribbons through the parish's farmed landscape.

==== Plumpton Mill Stream ====
The Plumpton Mill Stream arises at Plumpton Place. The Stream once had three water mills. The pond of the Upper Mill is now a wilderness of alder carr and marsh marigolds, anachronistically called 'Reed Pond'. The bed of the Stream is made up of flint shingle brought there by Ice age torrents. The chalk stream has frequent bullhead fishlings, freshwater shrimps, orb shell cockles, pond snails, caddis, and mayfly

Half a mile south west of the race course, hidden away on the steep bank of one of the stream's tributaries, is a maiden English Oak (TQ 355 148). It has a girth of 3.66 spans and great limbs straddling the stream. The stream's banks at that point are covered in ramsons, bluebells and moschatel.

In late 2016 the lower Plumpton Mill Stream and the whole of the Bevern Stream below her were polluted by a huge volume of slurry from Plumpton College Dairy Unit. All the fish in the affected streams were killed. The streams and their wildlife are still recovering.

==== Bevern stream ====
The Bevern is fed by the clear chalky waters of Plumpton Mill Stream arising at moated Plumpton Place. There are crossings and short accessible bank lengths all the way west past Plumpton Green.

=== Scarp and downland ===
The south of the parish rises to the top of the Downs and the slope forms part of Clayton to Offham Escarpment, which is a Site of Special Scientific Interest. There are a number of interesting and historic sites within this area of the parish.

==== Tumuli ====
On the scarp, there are three clusters of round barrows on each of the three main spurs that jut forward. They are likely to have been built by Bronze Age farmers. Most of the barrows are not obvious, but there is one that is a yard tall on an arable field just south of the South Downs Way and just west of Novington Plantation (TQ 364 125). Most of them have 'pillage dimples' in their tops where erstwhile treasure hunters or predatory antiquarians dug them out.

The Plumpton bostal (TQ 360 128) rises from the Half Moon Inn. It was an army road in the Second World War taking vehicles to the training grounds on the plateau, so it has been concreted. It looks down over a stretch of scarp with a good assemblage of Down pasture flowers. It is still owned by Brighton Council, though leased to Plumpton College. At the base of the scarp the woodland is relatively rich in species, with bluebells and ramsons.

==== Plumpton Plain ====
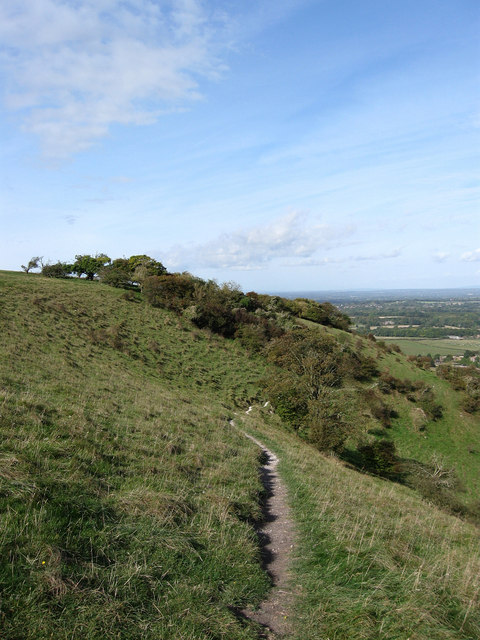
Bridleway to Plumpton

The earthworks on Plumpton Plain is a Scheduled Monument designated in 1933. Most of this landscape has been since been ploughed, but at the top of a gentle valley (TQ 357 121), about four hundred metres south of the South Downs escarpment, there is evidence of Bronze Age settlements from about 3600 to 2900 years ago. These were the first people in Britain to organise a settled agriculture, based on the use of the ox plough, with sharp land divisions and long-lived nucleated settlements. What is remarkable about Plumpton Plain place is that there are bumps and hollows which mark the famers' house sites, house ponds, farm paths and even the earliest ridge and furrow cultivation traces to be found in southern England.

One enclosure, still covered in scrub, lies to the west of the bridlepath running southwards from the South Downs Way. Four more, to the east of the bridlepath, are under pasture but can still be seen with the use of a site plan, as are the field paths and banks. On the wooded valley sides to the south east there are other house sites and field lynchets.

There is a lot of evidence of the tools that the Bronze Age people used and it is relatively easy to find an axe head. The archeologist, David McOmish, when uncovering these settlements found a complete Neolithic flint axe, twenty-six centimetres long.

==== Plumpton Cross ====
To the south of Plumpton Plain is a 100-foot cross carved into the chalk, probably made by the monks of St Pancras Priory in Lewes, following the battle there in 1264 (below). The cross is no longer white, but to the knowledgeable eye it is still visible due to its lighter-coloured grass. It can be seen from a distance of several miles when the sun is low and the depression is in shadow.

==== Faulkner's Bottom ====
Faulkner's Bottom (TQ 352 116) has evidence of the field systems of the Bronze Age settlements found in Plumpton Plain. Most of the visible signs of those people have been ploughed out, but on the west side of Faulkner's Bottom two Bronze Age enclosures survive, as well as an undated 'valley entrenchment' crossed by a terrace way at the head of the valley (TQ 352 125). This rectangular enclosure is atmospheric, with old thorn bushes, bracken and rosebay glades, and with some scrub oaks. There is a long strip along the steep eastern valleys where archaic Down pastures still survive. There are orchids, dropwort, lousewort, centaury and hogweed testifying to little management and occasional cattle grazing. At its southern end laurel, spruce, pine and cypress has been planted (TQ 355 112) presumably to keep the pheasants reared there happy.

== Governance ==
Plumpton lies within the Chailey ward for the East Sussex County Council tier of government. The ward also includes Chailey itself, Ditchling, East Chiltington, Newick, St John Without, Streat, Westmeston and Wivelsfield.

Plumpton is served by Lewes District Council and is covered by the Plumpton, Streat, East Chiltington and St John Without ward which returns a single seat. At the 2011 census the population for this area was only 2,276.

Plumpton is represented in the UK Parliament by the Lewes constituency. The current serving MP is the Liberal Democrat James MacCleary who won the seat in the 2024 general election.

== Education ==
Plumpton Primary School is located in Plumpton Green and was built in 1974 for children living in Plumpton and surrounding villages, especially Wivelsfield, Hamsey, and Chailey. The school has an assembly hall, a student library, a playing field and a (now defunct) swimming pool.

== Village groups ==
There are many groups and societies in comparison to the size of the village; one of the most notable being Plumpton Players, a drama group. The society performs up to two plays a year.

There are also sporting groups, which attract visitors from across Sussex, including cricket, tennis, rugby and football clubs. The rugby club plays in Sussex Division 1. The cricket club is one of the most successful village teams in the area consistently winning both the Mid Sussex League and the Wisdom Cup. The club was the first in the area to wear "Coloured Clothing" in their cup matches. The kit consisted of maroon and yellow trousers with matching shirts.

== Notable people ==
- Edward James Boys (1916-2002), historian of the Crimean War was born here
- Sally Thomsett (1950-), actress in The Railway Children and Man About the House was born here.
- Queen Camilla, second wife of King Charles III, and eldest daughter of Major Bruce Shand, grew up in the former rectory known as The Laines.
- Jimmy Page (1944-) Led Zeppelin guitarist lived in Plumpton Place between 1972 and 1985
