= Cat's ear =

Cat's ear is the common name for several species of flowering plants:

- Hypochaeris species, especially Hypochaeris radicata
- Some Calochortus species, also called mariposa lilies
