= Barren strawberry =

Barren strawberry is a common name for several plants which may refer to:

- Potentilla, or in particular Potentilla sterilis, native to Europe
- Waldsteinia fragarioides, native to eastern North America

== See also ==
- Mock strawberry, Potentilla indica a.k.a. Duchesnea indica, native to eastern and southern Asia
