= Fleabane =

Fleabane is a common name for some flowering plants in the family Asteraceae.

- Most are in the subfamily Asteroideae:
  - Tribe Astereae:
    - Conyza (butterweeds or horseweeds)
    - Erigeron
  - Tribe Inuleae:
    - Inula ("yellowheads")
    - Pluchea (camphorweeds, fleabanes)
    - Pulicaria (Inuleae)
- Subfamily Vernonioideae
  - Tribe Vernonieae
    - Vernonia (ironweeds)
