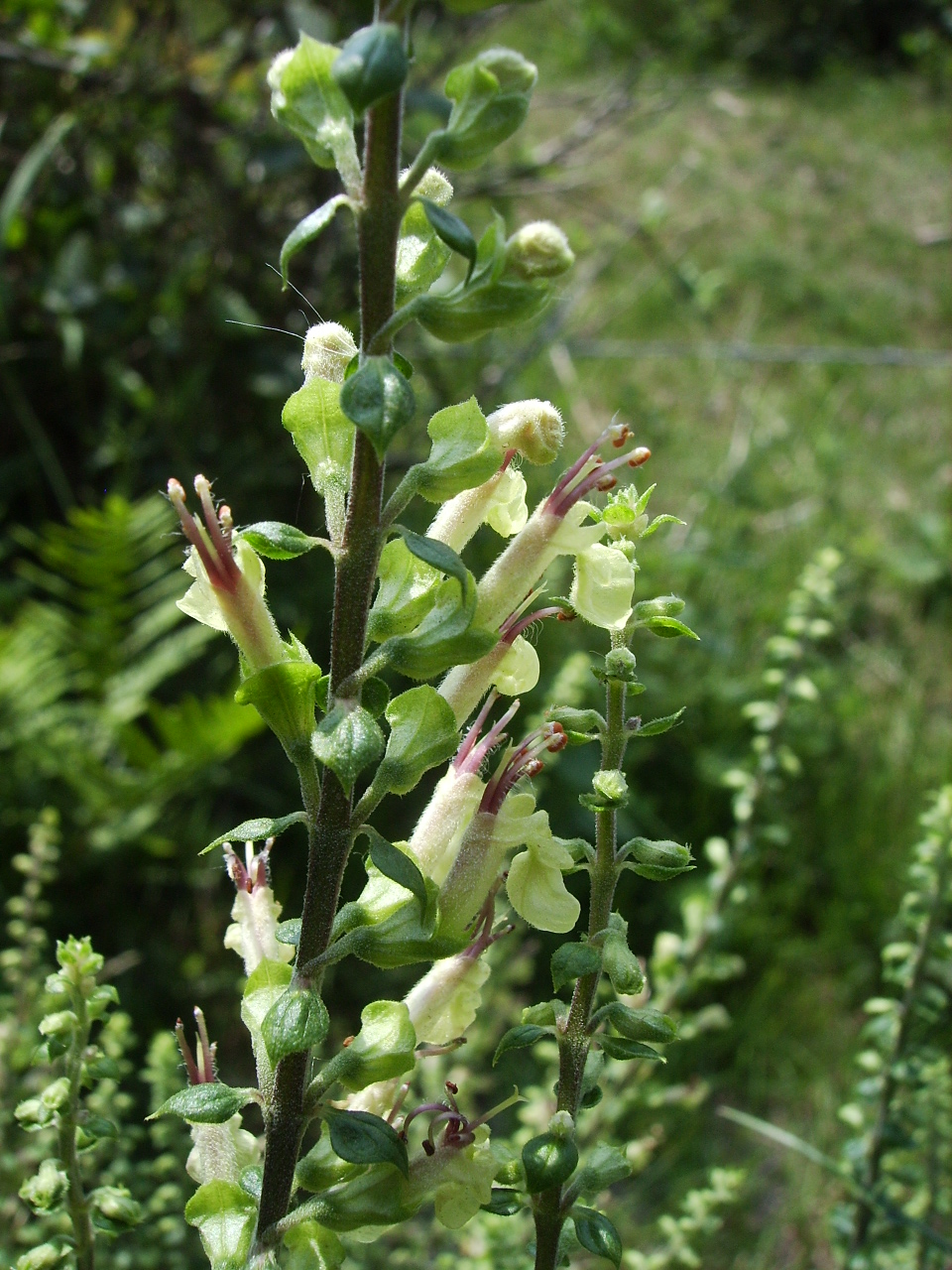

Scientific classification
- Kingdom: Plantae
- Clade: Tracheophytes
- Clade: Angiosperms
- Clade: Eudicots
- Clade: Asterids
- Order: Lamiales
- Family: Lamiaceae
- Genus: Teucrium
- Species: T. scorodonia

Binomial name
- Teucrium scorodonia L.

= Teucrium scorodonia =

Species of herb

Teucrium scorodonia, common name the woodland germander or wood sage, is a species of flowering plant in the genus Teucrium of the family Lamiaceae. It is native to Western Europe and Tunisia, but cultivated in many places as an ornamental plant in gardens, and naturalized in several regions (New Zealand, Azores, and a few locales in North America).

== Description ==
Teucrium scorodonia reaches on average 30–60 centimetres (12–24 in) of height. It is a hairy herbaceous perennial with erect and branched stems. The leaves are petiolate, irregularly toothed, triangular-ovate to oblong shaped, lightly wrinkled. The inflorescence is composed of one-sided (all flowers "look" at the same side) pale green or yellowish flowers bearing four stamens with reddish or violet filaments. These flowers grow in the axils of the upper leaves and are hermaphrodite, tomentose and bilabiate but lack an upper lip, as all Teucrium ones. The flowering period extends from June through August. These plants are pollinated mainly by Hymenoptera species.

== In medicine ==
Grieve writes of the Woodsage's medicinal properties: "Alterative and diuretic, astringent tonic, emmenagogue. Much used in domestic herbal practice for skin affections and diseases of the blood, also in fevers, colds, inflammations, and as an emmenagogue. It is useful for quinsy, sore throat, and in kidney and bladder trouble. In chronic rheumatism it has been used with benefit, and is considered a valuable tonic and restorer of the system after an attack of rheumatism, gout, etc. The infusion (freshly prepared) is the proper mode of administration, made from 1 OZ. of the dried herb to 1 pint of boiling water, taken warm in wineglassful doses, three or four times a day. Wood Sage is an appetizer of the first order, and as a tonic will be found equal to Gentian. It forms an excellent bitter combined with Comfrey and Ragwort, which freely influences the bladder. "

Culpepper (as cited by Grieve): "The decoction of the green herb with wine is a safe and sure remedy for those who by falls, bruises or blows suspect some vein to be inwardly broken, to disperse and void the congealed blood and consolidate the veins. The drink used inwardly and the herb outwardly is good for such as are inwardly or outwardly bursten, and is found to be a sure remedy for the palsy. The juice of the herb or the powder dried is good for moist ulcers and sores. It is no less effectual also in green [infected] wounds to be used upon any occasion."

== Subspecies ==
- Teucrium scorodonia subsp. baeticum (Boiss. & Reut.) Tutin
- Teucrium scorodonia subsp. euganeum (Vis.) Arcang

== Habitat ==
These plants prefer sandy soils in woodland and acid heaths, at an altitude of 0–1,500 metres (0–5,000 ft) above sea level.

== Gallery ==
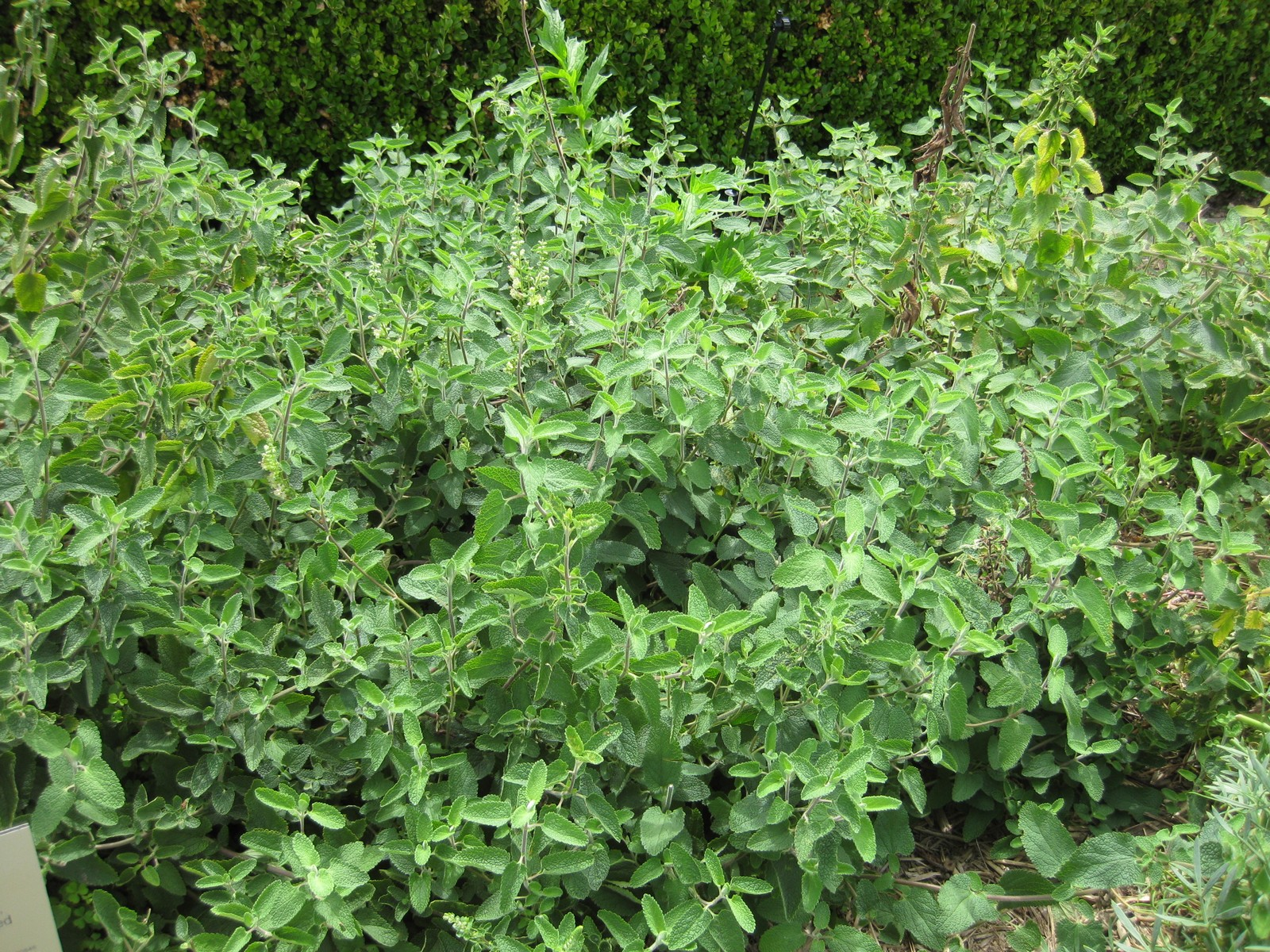

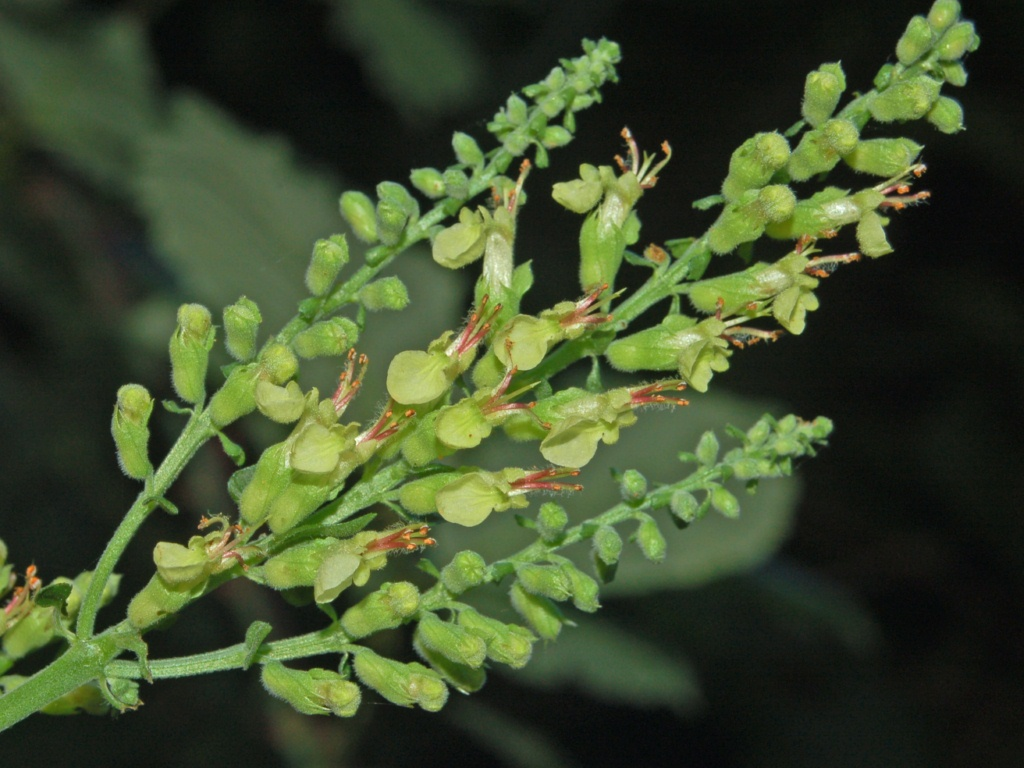

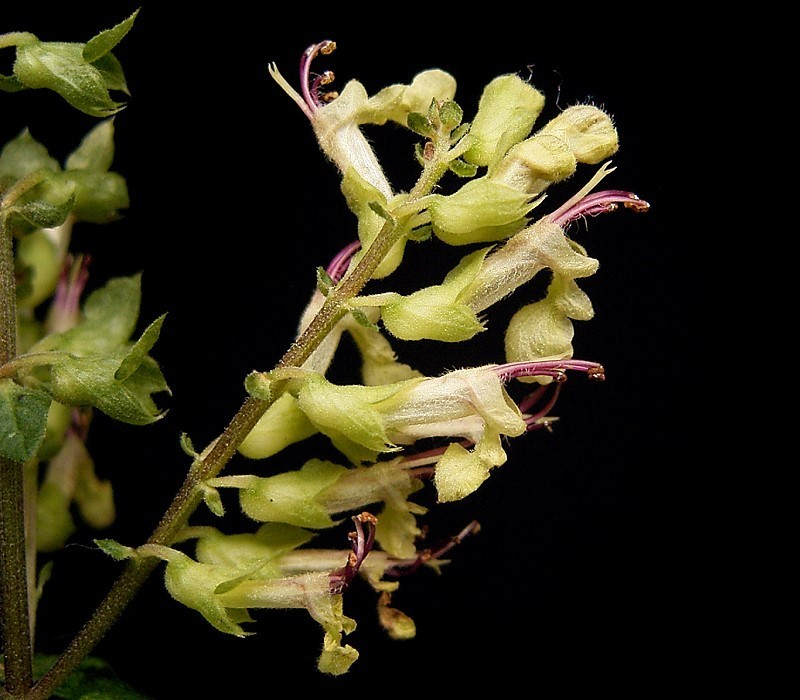

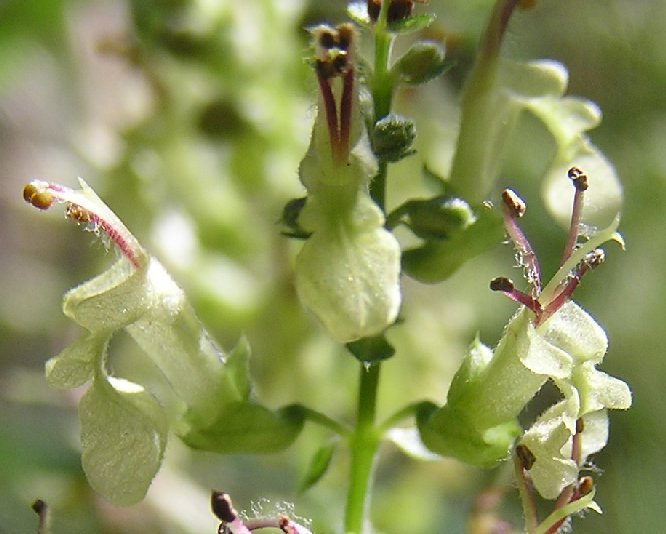
Close-up of flowers

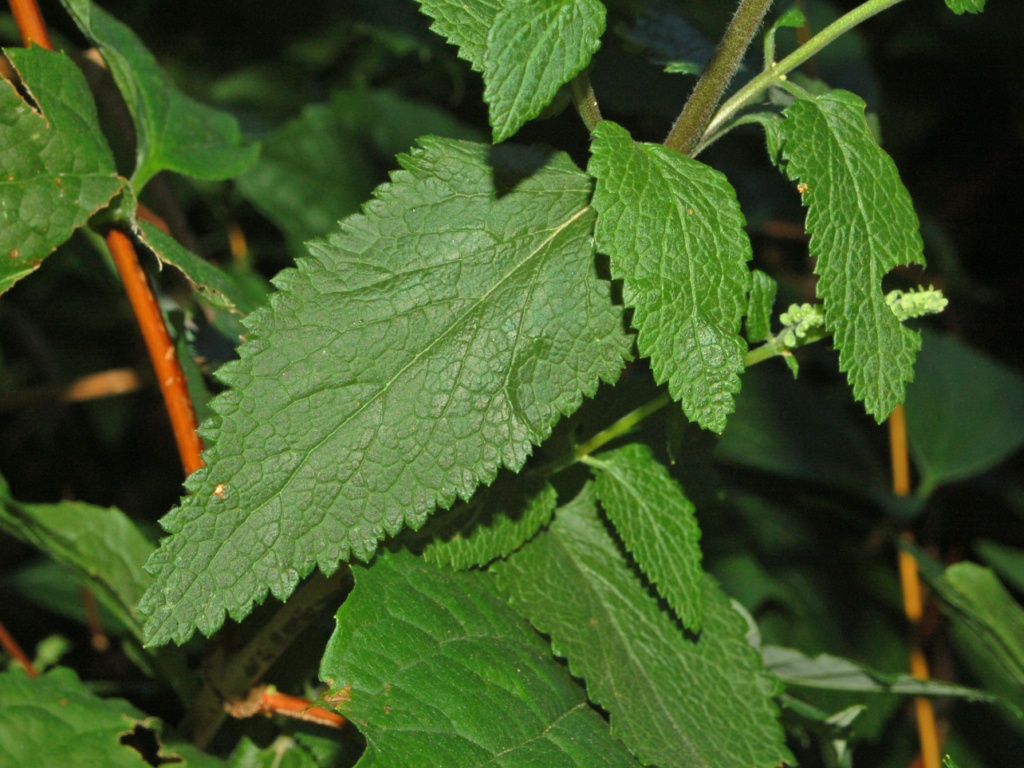
