= Chailey =

Village and parish in East Sussex, England

Coordinates: 50.96°N 0.01°W

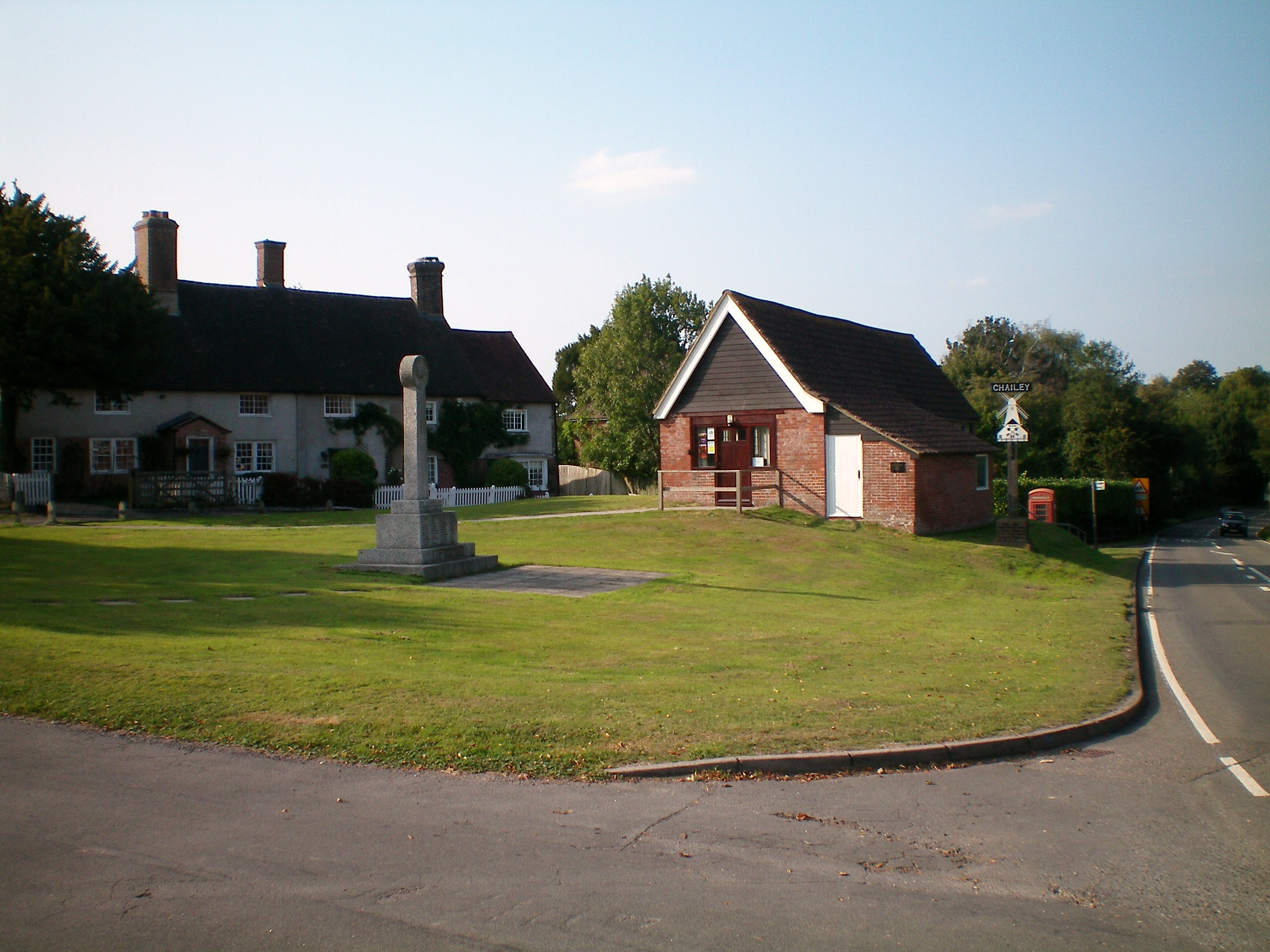
- The Green

- Location within East Sussex
- Area: 24.9 km^{2} (9.6 sq mi)
- Population: 3,088 (2011)
  - Density: 281/sq mi (108/km^{2})
- OS grid reference: TQ395194
  - London: 30 miles (48 km) north
- District: Lewes
- Shire county: East Sussex
- Region: South East
- Country: England
- Sovereign state: United Kingdom
- Post town: LEWES
- Postcode district: BN8
- Dialling code: 01273, 01825
- Police: Sussex
- Fire: East Sussex
- Ambulance: South East Coast
- UK Parliament: East Grinstead and Uckfield
- Website: http://www.chailey.org/

Chailey is a village and civil parish in the Lewes District of East Sussex, England. It is located 7 miles north of Lewes, on the A272 road from Winchester to Canterbury. The Prime Meridian passes just to the east of Chailey.

The parish consists of the settlements: South Chailey (which also incorporates South Common), South Street, Chailey (also known as Chailey Green) and North Chailey (which incorporates the North Common).

The parish church is dedicated to St. Peter and is recorded as having been built in 1256. Recently a special service was held to commemorate its 750 years. At one time Chailey had more churches than pubs. The churches being St Peter's, St Martin's (within Chailey Heritage), Chailey Free Church, St John's (now housing in South Common), and St Mary's (now housing in North Common), and the pubs being the King's Head, Five Bells, Horns Lodge and the Swan House. In addition it is believed another chapel was sited near the Bluebell railway.

Chailey is reputed to be the inspiration for the 1969 children's television series Chigley by Gordon Murray, (along with nearby Plumpton as Trumpton and Wivelsfield Green as Camberwick Green).

== Notable buildings and areas ==
Notable areas around Chailey

The parish of Chailey is large. It is so special because it is one of the remaining areas of the Sussex Weald with heathland Commons. Chailey Common is a Site of Special Scientific Interest that is located within the parish. It also has many areas with ancient woodland. To the north are the parishes of Haywards Heath and Fletching, to its east are Newick and Barcombe. To its south it borders the parishes of Hamsey, St John Without and East Chiltington and to its west, Wivelsfield.

=== The Church of St. Peter ===
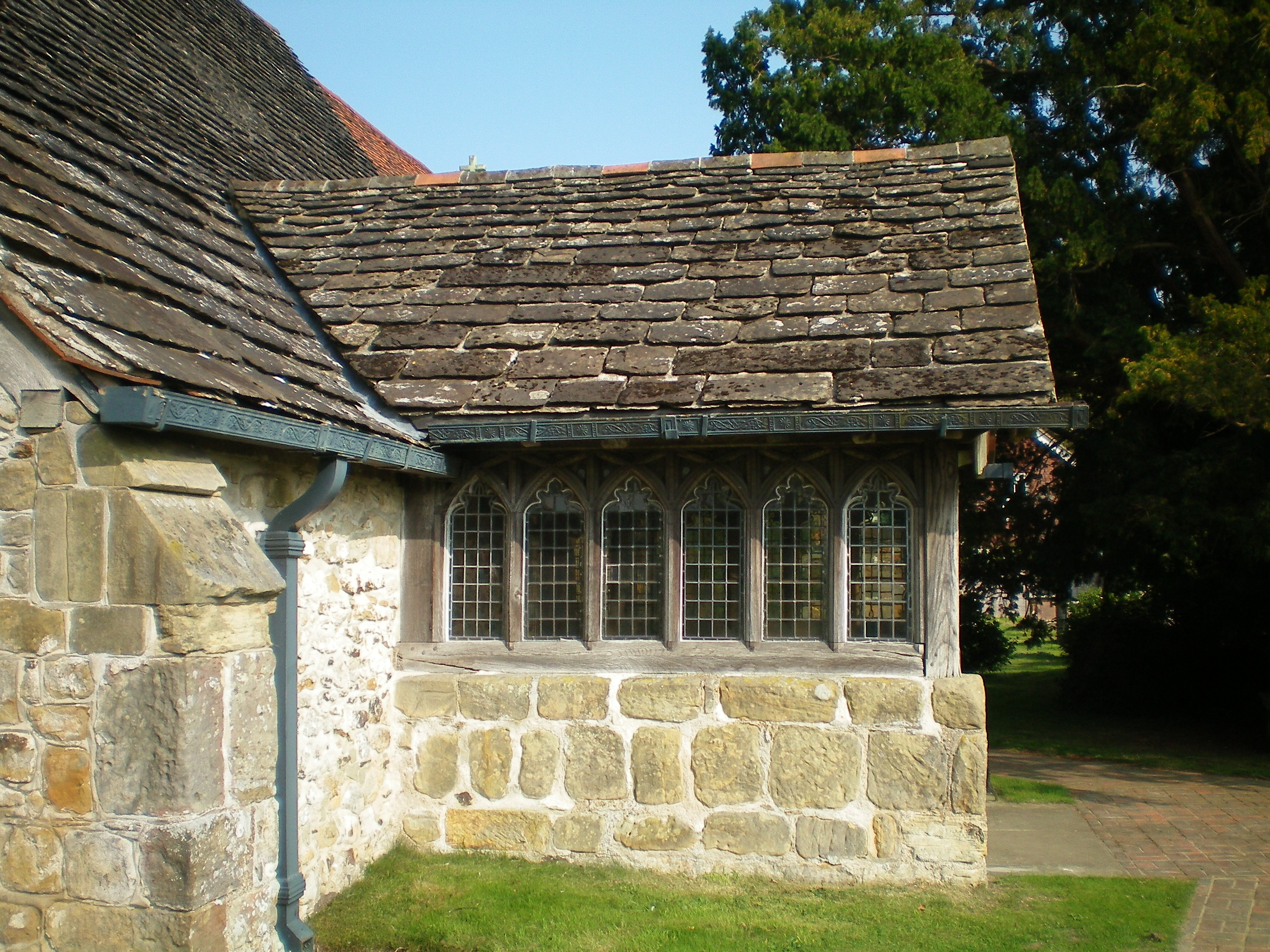
Chailey parish church of St Peter's

The parish has a 13th-century church dedicated to St. Peter at Chailey Green (TQ 392 193). The large graveyard has two fine old Yews that are over three span girth. The little archaic grassland is unimproved and a Site of Nature Conservation Interest (SCNI), but the parts nearest the church are mown too often and the southern extension are in poor condition. It is worth recording that at least one part of the SNCI (TQ380 189), a relict wet meadow, just north west of The Hooke has been destroyed only recently (2017).

=== The Heritage Mill ===
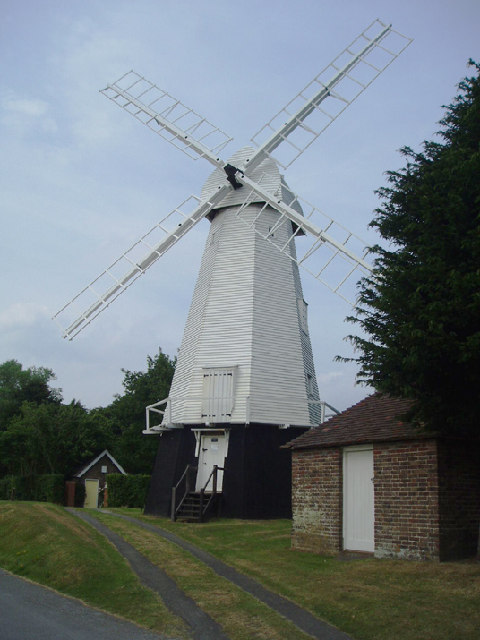
The Heritage windmill

The Heritage Mill is situated on the Red House Common. It is also known as Beard's Mill. It stands beside a yew tree said to mark the centre of Sussex. Records show that mills have stood here since at least 1590. The mill museum is open to visitors regularly.

There used to be a mill on the South Common in South Chailey, opposite where Chailey School is situated, but it has worn away over time.

=== Chailey Brickworks ===
Chailey Brickworks, now the Ibstock brickworks, (TQ 390 176), is one of the oldest factories in Europe, and has been in continuous production for over 300 years. There is deep pit (grid reference TQ 394 176) that is now a blue lake with gorse around its rim. The pit is made from bluish grey Upper Wealden Clay mudstones, with a bold pink stratum. Fossils have been found there, including the early flowering plant, Bevhalstia. There are also trace fossils which are likely to have been made by crustaceans, bands of fossil wood, insect and fish fossils. In Spring nightingales can be heard singing here.

=== Second World War D Day airfield ===
Second World War D Day airfield was on the west side of the parish by Townings farm. The RAF cleared the ground in 1942 for the Chailey Advanced Landing Ground. It was largely manned by Polish exile Spitfire squadrons, which supported the Normandy D Day landings in June 1944.

=== Farmland ===
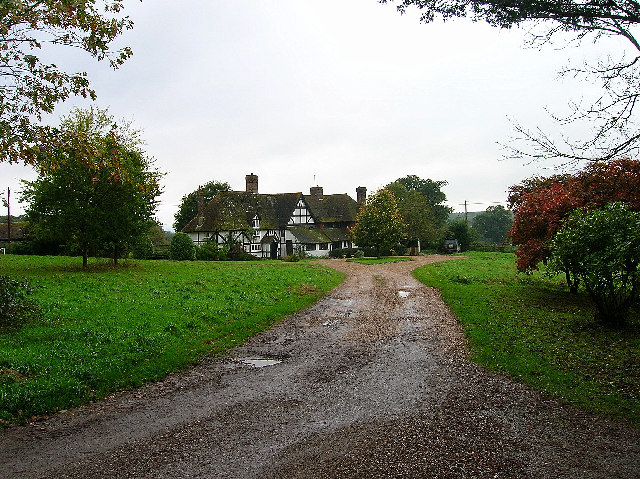
Southam farmhouse

The two largest estates in Chailey are the Hooke Estate which covers around a 1000 acres and the Hurst Barns Estate, South Chailey, which covers around 500 acres. The Hooke Estate is between South Chailey and Chailey Common and they include a cluster of working farms in this landscape. There are many fine old oak, beech and hornbeam veterans in the area and there are a few significant clusters of farm fields that have been preserved from the effects of traditional farming by their difficult terrain, or by sympathetic land managers, and which are very different to the 'improved' green dairy pastures we are used to seeing.

At Sedgebrook Farm, south west of Chailey Common, seven fields remain unimproved and are managed for nature. The farm's fields are the centre of a series of wet woods, damp meadows and carr that extend east to Godleys Green (TQ 371 198). In late spring the cotton grass and marsh cinquefoil covers many square metres of quaking bog amongst the carr. In Spring the perfume of water mint is widespread and you can find angelica, marsh pennywort, purple moor grass tussocks, sharp-flowered rush, black sedge and bog stitchwort. In late May, a southern meadow has swarms of meadow/marsh plume thistle with soft shaving brush carmine flowers on white-woolly stems, and there's ladys smock, spotted orchids, creeping willow and rare spring sedge. The higher and drier meadow in July, is yellow with bird's-foot trefoil. There are bush crickets, cone-headed heads, large marsh and meadow grasshoppers and 'bloodsucker' soldier beetles. The rushy meadows have water horsetail, sneezewort and clumps of narrow buckler fern in the shadier places.

Towning's Farm (TQ 377 201) has "an old fashioned air" with fine vernacular farm buildings and a good farm shop and some attractive pigs, poultry and sheep. Several of the fields on Towning's Farm have only been lightly 'improved'. As a result, some archaic vegetation still exists. For example, the pasture along the west side of Bineham Wood has tiny patches of Tormentil and other old herbs (2018). The woodland rides are the last redoubt for these old grassland species, but straw laid for the Pheasants in several of these woods can only harm that relict vegetation. Bower Farm too (TQ 373 190), to the south, has a dairy herd and some old buildings, like Towning's Farm, including an outhouse with herringbone ironstone walls.

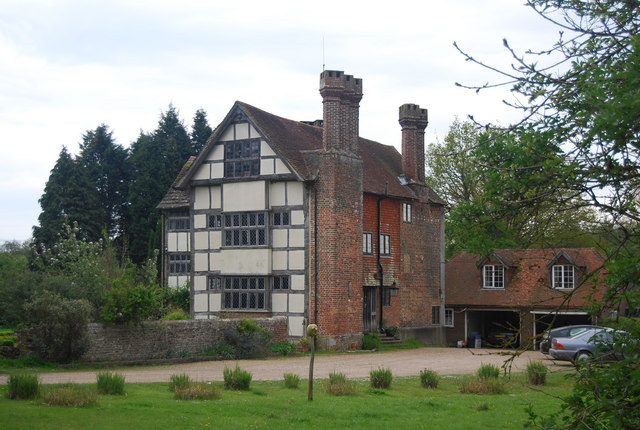
Wapsbourne Manor

Southam Farmhouse is a Tudor, timber framed, but modernised is to the west of the relatively new Southam Wood. The area was once part of the heathy South Common until its enclosure in 1841. Although new, just inside the wood, where the footpaths fork east of the farmhouse, is an ancient hornbeam dubbed 'The Octopus' (TQ 384 181), its many tendril-like branches writhing and wrapping around each other. At the north end of the wood, east of the footpath is a veteran beech with '1945 Audrey and Bill' carved on the bole next to two hearts pierced with an arrow.

There are a number of notable working farms in the area but there are also a number of wealthy owners who have gained or inherited wealth from non-farming means who utilise the farms. Many of them have bought a farm as a private nature reserve, as at the lovely archaic meadows of Vixengrove Farm, Chailey. These landowners display varying degrees of empathy to public usage, from hostility to open-hearted delight. This seems to be so at the lovely archaic meadows of Vixengrove Farm, Chailey.

Described in its listed building citation as "probably the most interesting house in Chailey parish" the 400 year old Wapsbourne Farmhouse (TQ 399 233) is a traditional L-shaped, timber framed, three storey building, with diamond shaped leaded panes in its casement windows, and big brick chimney stacks. The name means 'bourne path' (werpel) and perhaps referred to the partly lost track from Wapsbourne Gate and Farm westwards to the defunct Hunt's Gate crossroads, still marked by a huge veteran oak pollard, (TQ 391 234), hidden in the hedge where the footpath turns off from Butterbox Lane.

=== Commons ===
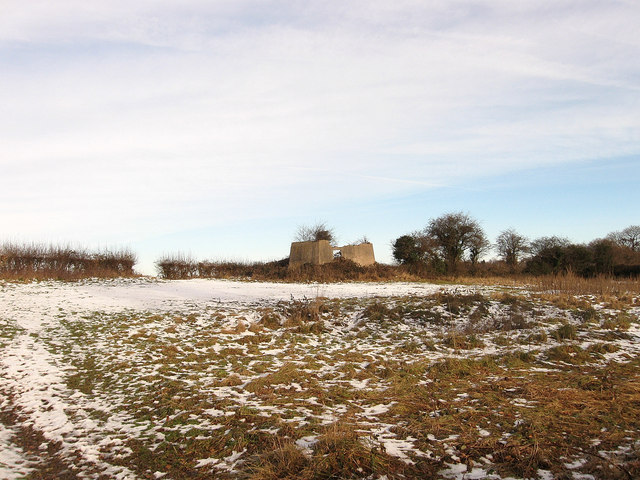
Remains of South Common Windmill

In the Middle Ages the Sussex Weald was a land of big commons, hunting chases and parks and it was only in the sixteenth and early seventeenth centuries that the majority were eradicated. A few have lived on though even to this day, and they still play this role as they are still an important part in community life and many hold important species such as aboriginal grasslands. To the north of the parish, Chailey Common is one of the remaining and best areas of heathland Commons in the Sussex Weald. Further south, Markstakes Common is also a well-maintained and regularly surveyed common. However, Chailey South Common is an example of one of the many lost commons to the county and is now only commemorated in name. It lay between South Chailey and South Street. Southam Wood was a part of the Common until it was enclosed in 1841. It was the last commons on clay ground in this part of the Sussex Weald and has the ruins of an old mill. The Warren (TQ 401 218), south of Lane End Common, is a lost piece of common land too. It still has some rides and glades that maintain a heathy character and since new management by the Sussex Wildlife Trust, seventeen of the rare marsh gentian have been seen there.

==== Chailey Common ====
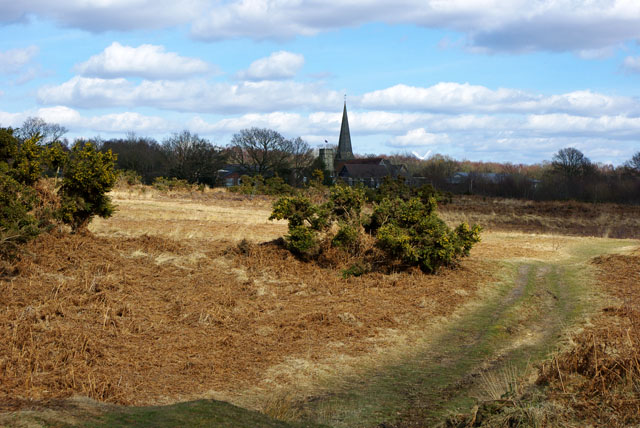
Pound Common, Chailey

Chailey Common is a Site of Special Scientific Interest that is located within the parish. Due to local pressure groups the area has been preserved as common land, is maintained for wildlife and been split into five areas and enclosed: Romany Ridge Common, Red House Common, Pound Common, Memorial Common and Land End Common. You may see white park cattle, ponies, or heath sheep out on the common for conservation, maintaining the natural equilibrium of species through grazing. The site, which is part of a nature reserve, is of biological interest due to its heath habitat, defined by its cover of ericaceous species (ling, cross-leaved heath and bell heather). Ericaceous vegetation occurs over about a mile, from south to north.

The area allows the growth of purple heathers in high summer. Fifty years ago Garth Christian saved the marsh gentian and they can still be seen there today with their trumpets full of tiny stars. Meadow thistle, sundew and round-leaved sundew are still present. It is one of the few sites left in the Sussex Weald with bog asphodel too. Woodcock, nightjar, bloody-nosed beetles, minotaur beetles, purse web spiders and black headed velvet ants frequent Chailey Common.

Chailey Common was one of the last sites in the Sussex Weald that you could find Silver Studded Blue butterflies but they may also be gone now. It is a shame that the site has no dedicated ranger to or that the Friends of Chailey Common website does not appear to have an open annual species reports as the Friends of Markstakes Common does.

If you walk from Lane End Common through Warr's Wood there a long sliver of heathland underneath the power lines with lousewort, ling heather, purple moor grass and heath grass, tormentil and heath speedwell.

==== Markstakes Common ====
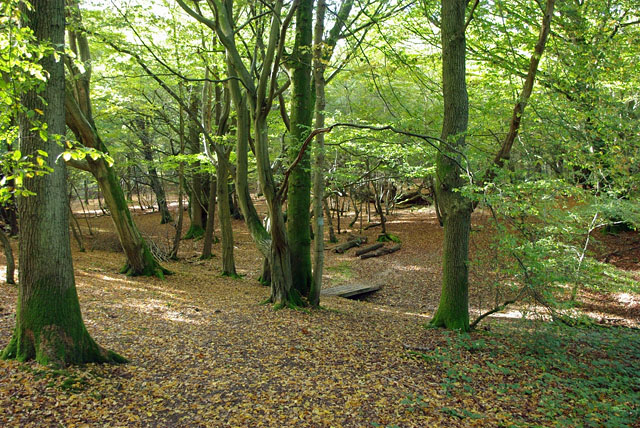
Markstakes Common

Markstakes Common (TQ 398 178) is a wooded common that it has received loving management for the last 50 years. Species like saw-wort and heath milkwort can be found on the heath. In recent surveys, too, special wetland plants have been refound like bog pondweed, marsh pennywort, ragged robin and wild hops, as well as dormice, adder, grass snake, and great crested and palmate newts. There are a number of bat colonies on the Common including the very rare 'old forest' Bechstein's bat colony recently discovered. Other species seem to have gone like the rare heath dog violet, lousewort, heath cudweed, sheep's fescue and sheep's sorrel.

Most of the Common's trees are young, and its woodland ground flora meagre, but there is a scatter of good veteran trees of several species, including old open-grown beech, mixed with hornbeam, holly, hazel, yew and oak. There is a good three-span-girth beech by the footpath that tracks south of Furzeley Farm (TQ 396 182). There is open bracken down the slope to the north, while the southern high ground of the Common is pitted and rumpled and borders Starvecrow wood. This area has more Ling heath, grass heath, and even a few patches of lichen heath amongst the Bracken and used to be wood pasture with an even more open mixture of trees and heath. There is also a seam of red marker clay outcrops, which are likely to have been mined. The Friends of Markstakes Common has an active website which provides an annual report including species list.

Wooded Balneath Lane (TQ 405 178) tracks a ridge eastwards from South Chailey to the Town Littleworth Road, with grand views north and south. At its western end, where it passes between the buildings of the Brickworks, it is called Caveridge Lane. All the land north of the ridge was part of Markstakes Common until 400 years ago, and Dodson's Rough and Grantham's Rough (TQ 403 159) retain many of the common's archaic wood and rough ground flowers.

=== Woodlands ===
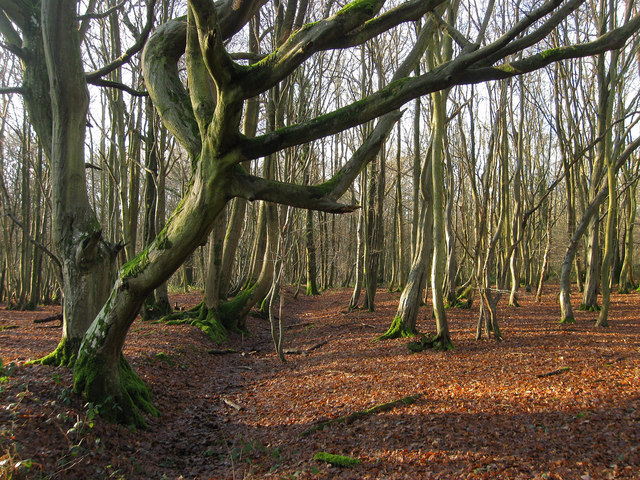
Woodbank, Starvecrow Wood

The varied ground of the Chailey parish results in different woodlands. The vale of the Bevern Stream is at the bottom of Chailey parish and has a number of pleasing little woods. Many of them are Bluebell woods under over-stood hornbeam coppice, with young oaks. While the fertile greensand areas are open and unwooded, on the Wealden Clay. Between Chailey Common and South Chailey there are the many medium-sized woods of the Hooke Estate and its neighbours. Going north towards the Lambourn Gill (Longford Stream), the acidic Hastings Beds, with their sands, hard sandrocks and clays, begin. As the ground rises towards Chailey North Common, the Wealden Clay gives way to Tunbridge Wells Sand and the woods subtly change, becoming drier and more acidic. They give a subtly different character to its woods. Many, such as Frick wood, are quite heathy and abundant with birch, ling heather and gorse.

==== Comps Wood and Wickham Wood ====
Comps Wood and Wickham Wood (in bordering St John Without parish) have names that were likely to have been given to them by the Romans, as two fields south is the Roman Greensand Way. 'Comp' (as in campus, a field) often indicates land around a Roman settlement and Wickham (as in vicus) indicates a small Roman settlement.

Comps Wood (TQ 393 158) is primarily a bluebell wood of hazel coppice, under ash and oak. Wickham Wood (TQ 390 156) is carpeted with wild garlic throughout. There are beautiful lime longhorn beetle that come from the line of Limes at Hurst Barns, just across the fields. house martin and skylark play in the nearby fields.

==== Swan, Oldbarns and Draper's Wood ====
Swan Wood (TQ 393 168) is behind the old Swan inn (now a private residence). It has many oak trees, hazel, bluebells and brambles. It is twinned with Oldbarns Wood, which is an ash wood, to its south west. Just north, alongside the playing fields of Chailey Secondary School, is Draper's Wood, a classic old hornbeam coppice wood over bluebells, (TQ 388 171).

==== Hovel and Sawpit Wood ====
To the south east of the parish are Hovel (TQ 389 162) and Sawpit Wood (TQ 383 163). Both made up off Hornbeam coppice, with young oaks. Sawpit Wood is on a hill to the north of Hurst Barns and has wild daffodils, scented sweet violets and bluebells.

==== Balneath and Wilding Wood ====
The fate of the once beautiful and ancient woodlands of Balneath and Wilding has been rather sad. Balneath Wood (TQ 403 174) was largely a hornbeam wood, fuelling the brickwork's kilns, but between 1980 and 1981, it was destroyed by the farmer-landowner. He was persuaded to leave the woodland gill and boundaries intact, for cosmetic reasons and for game. At least 16 ancient woodland species are still evident from it rich past with remaining midland hawthorn, wild service trees, aspen and crab apple and, where fragments of the wood survive, old hornbeam stools survive.

Wilding Wood (TQ 400 187) north of Markstakes Lane, suffered a similar fate. It was also an ancient woodland, but it was coniferised wall-to-wall and only a thin strip of old woodland survives along some edges. It is dark and dead underneath, although a big herd of fallow deer take shelter there.

==== Kiln and Starvecrow Wood ====
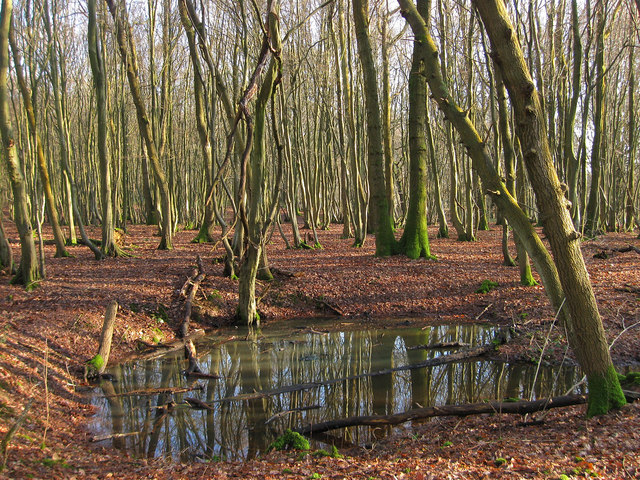
Pond, Kiln Wood

To the east of South Chailey, the woods bear the imprint of centuries of quarrying and brick and pottery production. Kiln Wood (TQ 394 173) is on the southern edge a deep pit dug for the Chailey Brickworks, now the Ibstock brickworks. The wood has shares its name as the wood by Hamsey brickworks. It has sessile oak poles, old hornbeam coppice, and wild cherry (gean). It has a small council estate within its embrace, and an old work yard with a rusty collection of vehicles. Starvecrow Wood (TQ 398 176), on the pit's eastern side and south of Markstakes Common, is an open woodland with humps and hollows everywhere, with some old knotty hornbeam.

==== Rabbit, Long, Eels Ash and Cottage Wood ====
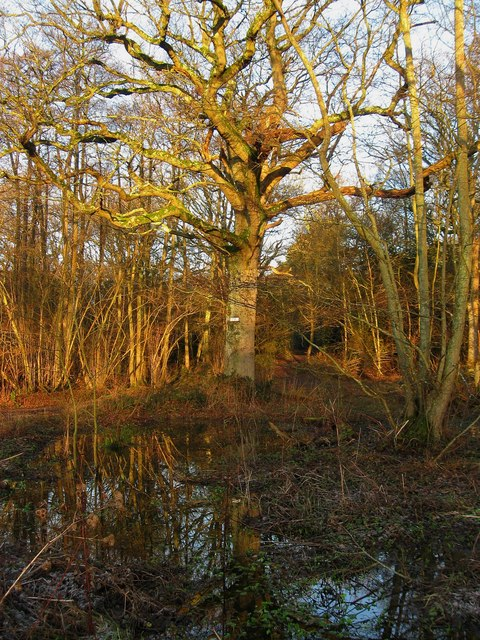
Cottage Wood

Rabbit Wood (TQ 389 186), is a classic Chailey woodland with tall straight oak, birch, hornbeam and Bluebell floor, with lovely glades. Long Wood (TQ385 189) to the northwest is an oak and hazel wood with a bluebell floor and some birch trees. The Lambourn Gill (Longford Stream) divides it from Eels Ash Wood (TQ385 193) which suffered badly from the 1998 storm and has since needed a lot of coppicing and clearance work. Just to the east of Eels Ash, down stream, and west of Chailey Green and church, is Chailey Moat (TQ388 194), once the Rectory, part Tudor, part Georgian, probably medieval in origin, with a new lake dwarfing the moat.

Just upstream, to the west, is Cottage Wood (TQ 380 194). It is damp and marshy on the southern streamside with alder, marigolds and plenty of wild garlic (ramsons) in plenty. In spring the owl midges swarm. Silver-washed fritillary butterflies and longhorn beetles enjoy the sunny side of the woods.

==== Towning's, Bineham, Toll, Popjoy and Mott Wood ====
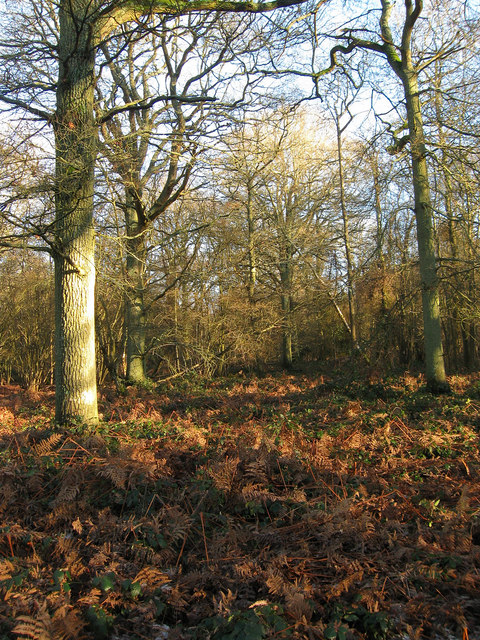
Popjoy Wood

Towning's Wood (TQ 377 196) is just north of Cottage Wood, but the Wealden Clay gives way to Tunbridge Wells Sand giving it a different character. There is ling heather, gorse and heath bedstraw in the open areas with downy and silver birch. Bineham Wood (TQ 384 202) is a large and varied wood. The southern half is coppice, carpeted with bluebells. An ancient, now gnarled and twisted, laid hornbeam hedge boundary bank goes all around the wood. The blackthorn hedges can provide such a large harvest of sloes in Autumn they emit a purple haze and the branches bend low under the weight of the berries.

Popjoy Wood (TQ375 188) is a Bluebell wood that wet in winter, with fine oaks, primroses, and lots of wild garlic at the south eastern end. To its west is Bower Farm and wet moor land. The hedgerows have long been removed as the land was used by the RAF in the second world war. The Chailey Advanced Landing Ground was used heavily by Polish exile Spitfire squadrons in the Normandy D Day landings. Sadly, most of little Toll Wood (TQ371 188}) has been destroyed, but on the west side of Mott Wood, part of the old Wotton Manor drove runs northwards and has a line of old oaks growing on its banks, three of which are over three spans girth and some more approaching it.

==== Great Home Wood ====
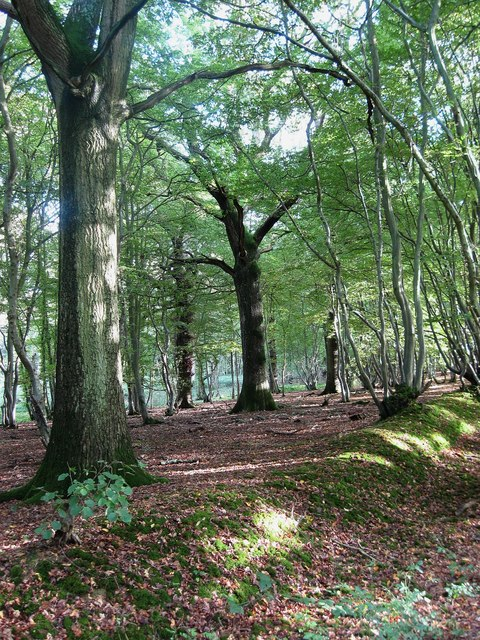
Great Home Wood

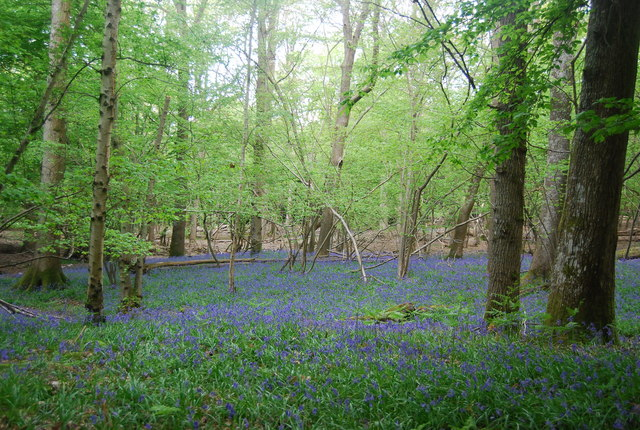
Bluebells, Wapsbourne Wood

On the south west parish border is Great Home Wood (TQ 372 182), a big abundant hornbeam coppice. It was part of an important desmesne 300-acre wood of the Priory of St Pancras at Lewes, but it was lost to the church, its commoners dispossessed and its woodland part-cleared and converted to farmland before 1650. A cluster of names attest to the medieval Homewood Woodland including: Middle, Wet (bulldozed several decades ago) and Great Homewood Farm. There is still evidence of the archaic vegetation of those lost wild lands, but not so much to make it hospitable to nightingales or warblers. There were drifts of wild daffodils at its northern end, but they seem very scarce now. The large amount of coppiced oak present is unusual, and there are ash, birch and old hornbeam coppice and a coup of pine at the south end. The ground cover is part anemone and bluebell and part bare. Deer have been grazing old coppice stools into dead mossy stumps, so that the wood is becoming open.

==== Wapsbourne Wood ====
Wapsbourne Wood (TQ 395 238) has hornbeam and sweet chestnut coppice with little Bracken glades, banks and dells, and flushes of Bluebells. The River Ouse runs down its north side. Ramsons and scarlet elf cup can be found along the banks. Unfortunately there are no freshwater mussels and few emergent plants, which is likely to be the influence of the sewage works upstream.

=== Streams ===
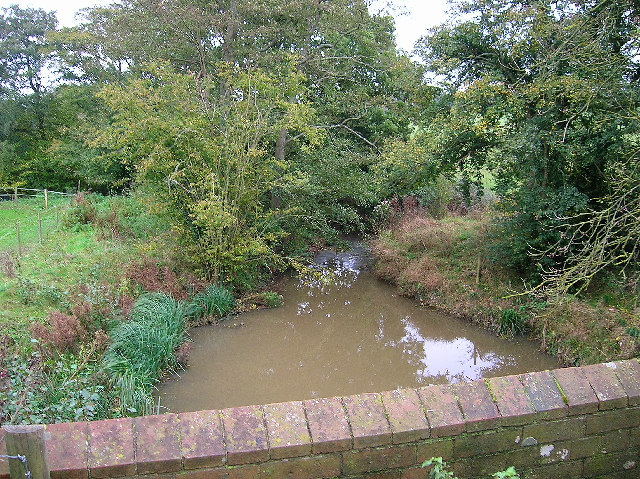
Bevern Stream at Bevern Bridge

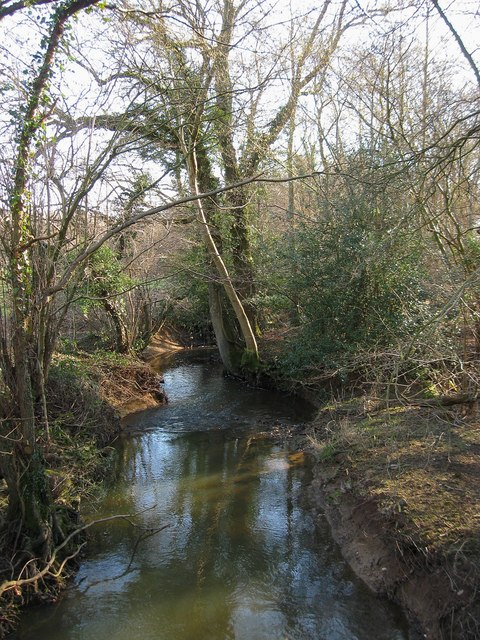
Pellingford Brook

There are three streams in the Chailey parish, all of which flow into the Ouse. The Bevern stream runs along the parishes southern border. Through the centre of the parish runs the Lambourn Gill, which turns into the Longford Stream when runs through the Barcombe parish. On the north of the parish is the Pellbrook Cut.

==== Bevern Stream ====
The Bevern Stream passes south of the parish and to the north side of Comp and Wickham woods. Mayflies, giant lacewing, beautiful demoiselles, and large red damselflies play in every sunny spot along the stream. There are Welshman's button caddis flies, and lots of scarce copse/orchard snails.

In late 2016 the Plumpton Mill Stream and the whole of the Bevern Stream below it were polluted by a huge volume of slurry from Plumpton College Dairy Unit. All the fish in the affected streams were killed. The streams will take many years to recover.

==== Lambourn Gill (Longford stream) ====
The Longford stream becomes the Lambourn Gill within Chailey parish, flowing past several central woods with sections of tall herb vegetation surviving along its banks. Between Long Wood and Cottage Wood (TQ 381 192), drained ponds have developed into a marshland habitat that supports wetland plant species, including cyperus sedge, wood club-rush, and lesser marshwort.

==== Pellingford Brook ====
The Pellingford Brook runs in the River Ouse at the Sheffield Park Bridge by the Bluebell railway station. It runs on the most northern part of the Chailey parish, but south of Waspbourne Wood. There are no public paths along the banks of the stream.

== Governance ==
Chailey is governed at the local level by Chailey Parish Council which consists of eleven councillors meeting twice monthly. The parish council is responsible for local amenities such as the provision of litter bins, bus shelters and allotments. They also provide a voice into the district council meetings. The May 2007 election was uncontested due to only eight candidates standing. Three more councillors were later co-opted to the council.

The next level of government is Lewes District Council. The District council supplies services such as refuse collection, planning consent, leisure amenities and council tax collection. Chailey is covered by the Chailey and Wivelsfield ward which returns two seats. In the May 2007 election, two councillors from the local Conservative party were elected. This ward is called Chailey and Wivelsfield and had a population of 5,068 at the 2011 Census.

Chailey lies within the Chailey ward for the next tier of government, East Sussex County Council. The ward also includes Ditchling, East Chiltington, Newick, Plumpton, St John Without, Streat, Westmeston and Wivelsfield. The County Council provides services such as roads and transport, social services, libraries and trading standards. The June 2009 election resulted in a win for the Conservative Meg Stroude, in 2013 and 2017 the Conservative Jim Sheppard and in 2021 the Conservative Matthew Milligan.

The UK Parliament constituency for Chailey is East Grinstead and Uckfield. Created prior to the 2024 General Election, it is represented by Mims Davies, a Conservative.

Prior to Brexit in 2020, the village was part of the South East England constituency in the European Parliament.

== Schools ==
There are three schools in the village: Chailey St Peters Primary School, which is the primary school in South Chailey; Chailey School, which is the secondary school in South Chailey; and Chailey Heritage School, which is a special needs school on Chailey Common.
