= Chailey Common =

Nature reserve in East Sussex, England

- Site of Special Scientific Interest
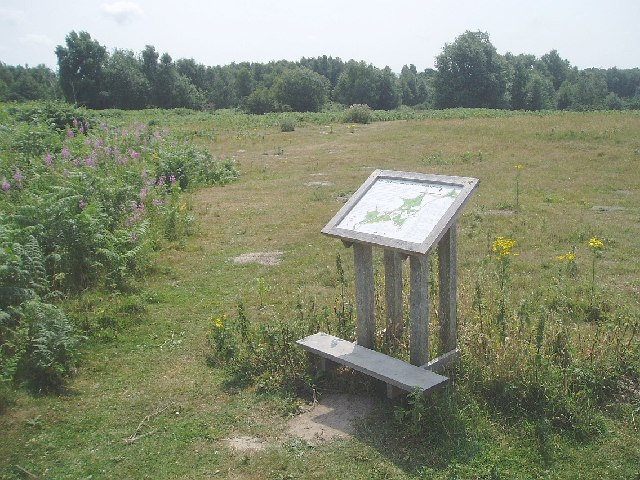

- Location within East Sussex
- Location of Chailey Common.
- Area of search: East Sussex
- Grid reference: TQ390215
- Coordinates: 50.976008°N 0.019123°W
- Interest: Biological
- Area: 169 ha (420 acres)
- Notification date: 1954

Chailey Common is a 169 hectare (417.4 acre) biological site of Special Scientific Interest in the East Sussex. It is close to the village of North Chailey to the west of Newick. The site was notified in 1985 under the Wildlife and Countryside Act 1981. It is also a Local Nature Reserve.

The site consists of five enclosures: Romany Ridge Common, Red House Common, Pound Common, Memorial Common and Land End Common. The areas are maintained for species diversity through careful grazing and management. Lane End Common, (grid reference TQ 403 223) was separated from the bulk of the Chailey Common enclosures in the nineteenth century. Its heathy and bosky spaces are now fenced and grazed by mild park cattle.

The Common supports various heath communities, including ling, cross-leaved heath and bell heather and other rare botanical species. Fifty years ago Garth Christian saved the marsh gentian from going extinct from the area and its trumpets full of tiny stars can still be seen there today. Meadow thistle, sundew and round-leaved sundew are still present in the area thanks to careful nursing and it is one of the few sites left in the Sussex Weald with bog asphodel.

The botanical richness in turn supports important and rare invertebrate including bloody-nosed beetles, minotaur beetles, purse web spiders and black headed velvet ants. Up the food chain, the area can also support rare bird species, including woodcock and nightjar. The habitat also supports various butterflies which are rare in the county. Chailey Common was one of the last sites in the Sussex Weald that you could find Silver Studded Blue butterflies, but they seem to be gone from the area now.

== See also ==
- Garth Christian, former conservator
- List of Sites of Special Scientific Interest in East Sussex
