= Gumaga griseola =

Scientific classification
- Domain: Eukaryota
- Kingdom: Animalia
- Phylum: Arthropoda
- Class: Insecta
- Order: Trichoptera
- Family: Sericostomatidae
- Genus: Gumaga
- Species: G. griseola

Binomial name
- Gumaga griseola (McLachlan, 1871)

Synonyms
- Notidobia griseola McLachlan, 1871

Species of caddisfly

Gumaga griseola is a species of bushtailed caddisfly in the family Sericostomatidae. It is found in North America.
