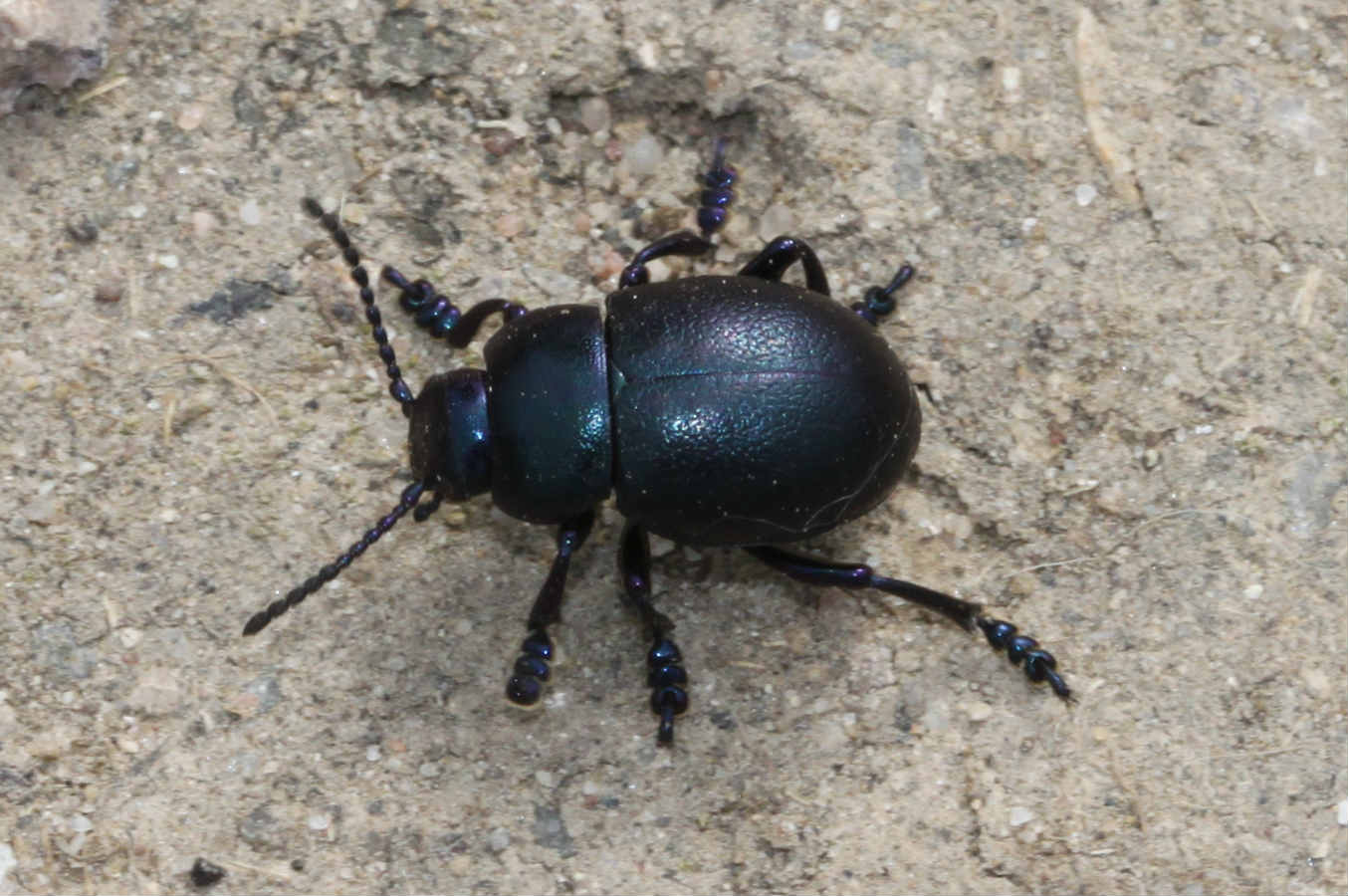

Scientific classification
- Kingdom: Animalia
- Phylum: Arthropoda
- Clade: Pancrustacea
- Class: Insecta
- Order: Coleoptera
- Suborder: Polyphaga
- Infraorder: Cucujiformia
- Family: Chrysomelidae
- Genus: Timarcha
- Species: T. goettingensis

Binomial name
- Timarcha goettingensis (Linnaeus, 1758)

= Timarcha goettingensis =

Species of beetle

Timarcha goettingensis, commonly known as the Small Bloody-nosed Beetle or the Lesser Bloody-nosed Beetle is a species of leaf beetle native to Europe.

== Description ==
T. goettingensis is a shiny blue-black, violet-copper, or black beetle measuring 8–13 mm in length. Visually it may be confused with Timarcha tenebricosa, but this beetle is larger (11–18 mm) and is more constricted on the base of its pronotum than T. goettingensis. Timarcha goettingensis may also be visually confused with Chrysolina sturmi.
