= Stenostola basisuturalis =

Scientific classification
- Domain: Eukaryota
- Kingdom: Animalia
- Phylum: Arthropoda
- Class: Insecta
- Order: Coleoptera
- Suborder: Polyphaga
- Infraorder: Cucujiformia
- Family: Cerambycidae
- Genus: Stenostola
- Species: S. basisuturalis

Binomial name
- Stenostola basisuturalis Gressitt, 1935

Species of beetle

Stenostola basisuturalis is a species of beetle in the family Cerambycidae. It was described by Gressitt in 1935. It is known from China.
