= Stenostola alboscutellata =

Scientific classification
- Domain: Eukaryota
- Kingdom: Animalia
- Phylum: Arthropoda
- Class: Insecta
- Order: Coleoptera
- Suborder: Polyphaga
- Infraorder: Cucujiformia
- Family: Cerambycidae
- Genus: Stenostola
- Species: S. alboscutellata

Binomial name
- Stenostola alboscutellata Kraatz, 1862

Species of beetle

Stenostola alboscutellata is a species of beetle in the family Cerambycidae. It was described by Kraatz in 1862. It is known from Greece.
