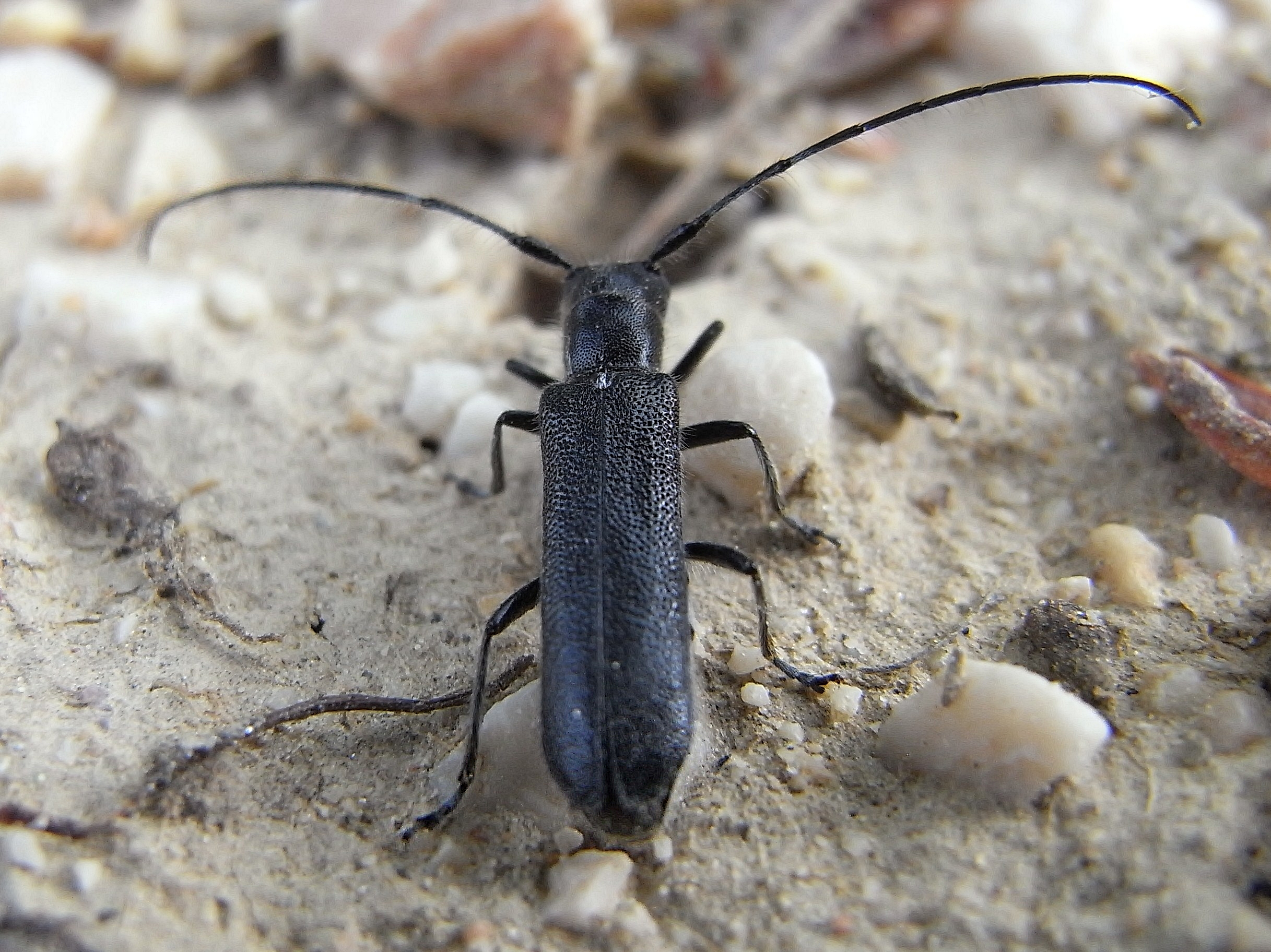
- Stenostola dubia

Scientific classification
- Kingdom: Animalia
- Phylum: Arthropoda
- Class: Insecta
- Order: Coleoptera
- Suborder: Polyphaga
- Infraorder: Cucujiformia
- Family: Cerambycidae
- Tribe: Saperdini
- Genus: Stenostola; Dejean, 1835

= Stenostola =

Genus of beetles

Stenostola is a genus of longhorn beetles of the subfamily Lamiinae, containing the following species:

- Stenostola alboscutellata Kraatz, 1862
- Stenostola atra Gressitt, 1951
- Stenostola basisuturalis Gressitt, 1935
- Stenostola dubia (Laicharting, 1784)
- Stenostola ferrea (Schrank, 1776)
- Stenostola ivanovi Danilevsky 2014
- Stenostola nigerrima (Breuning, 1947)
- Stenostola pallida Gressitt, 1951
