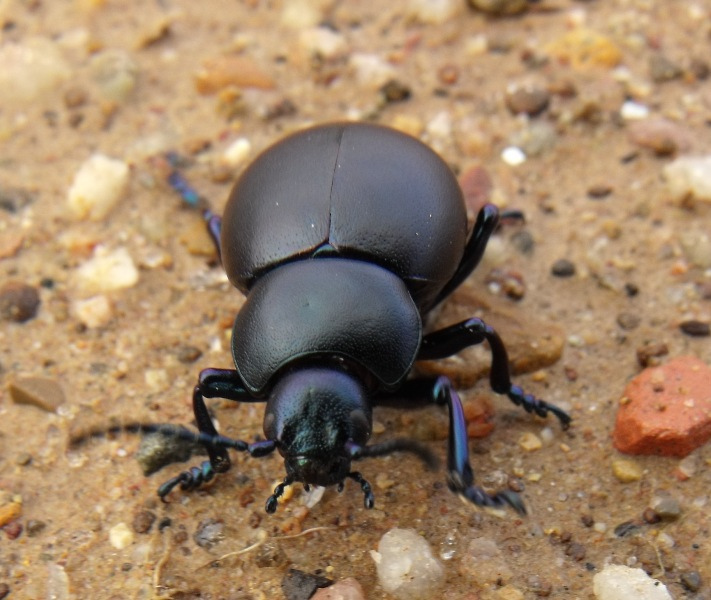

Scientific classification
- Kingdom: Animalia
- Phylum: Arthropoda
- Clade: Pancrustacea
- Class: Insecta
- Order: Coleoptera
- Suborder: Polyphaga
- Infraorder: Cucujiformia
- Family: Chrysomelidae
- Genus: Timarcha
- Species: T. nicaeensis

Binomial name
- Timarcha nicaeensis A.Villa & G.B.Villa, 1835

= Timarcha nicaeensis =

Species of beetle

Timarcha nicaeensis is a species of leaf beetle.

It was described in 1853 by A. Villa and G.B Villa.

== Range ==
Timarcha nicaeensis lives across Southern Europe, including the Iberian Peninsula.
