= Timarcha intricata =

Scientific classification
- Kingdom: Animalia
- Phylum: Arthropoda
- Clade: Pancrustacea
- Class: Insecta
- Order: Coleoptera
- Suborder: Polyphaga
- Infraorder: Cucujiformia
- Family: Chrysomelidae
- Genus: Timarcha
- Species: T. intricata

Binomial name
- Timarcha intricata Haldeman, 1853

Species of beetle

Timarcha intricata is a species of leaf beetle in the family Chrysomelidae. It is found in North America.
