= Notidobia =

Scientific classification
- Kingdom: Animalia
- Phylum: Arthropoda
- Clade: Pancrustacea
- Class: Insecta
- Order: Trichoptera
- Family: Sericostomatidae
- Genus: Notidobia; Stephens, 1829

Genus of insects

Notidobia is a genus of insects belonging to the family Sericostomatidae.

The species of this genus are found in Europe and Northern America.

Species:

- Notidobia bizensis (Malicky & Sipahiler, 1993)
- Notidobia ciliaris (Linnaeus, 1761)
