= Stenostola nigerrima =

Scientific classification
- Kingdom: Animalia
- Phylum: Arthropoda
- Class: Insecta
- Order: Coleoptera
- Suborder: Polyphaga
- Infraorder: Cucujiformia
- Family: Cerambycidae
- Genus: Stenostola
- Species: S. nigerrima

Binomial name
- Stenostola nigerrima (Breuning, 1947)

Synonyms
- Phytoecia nigerrima Breuning, 1947

Species of beetle

Stenostola nigerrima is a species of beetle in the family Cerambycidae. It was described by Stephan von Breuning in 1947. It is known from Japan.
