= Chailey Moat =

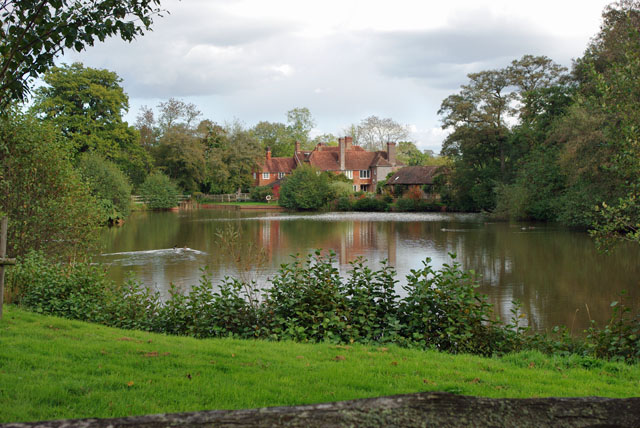
- Chailey Moat and lake

- Shown in East Sussex
- 50.9576°N 0.02465°W
- Location: Chailey, East Sussex

History
- Built: 16th century (oldest parts)

Listed Building – Grade II
- Official name: Chailey Moat
- Designated: 17 March 1952
- Reference no.: 1352968

Chailey Moat is a Grade II listed building near the village of Chailey, East Sussex. It is a 16th-century moated two storey house with an 18th-century facade. It is a former rectory with 45 1/2 acres of gardens and other land.
