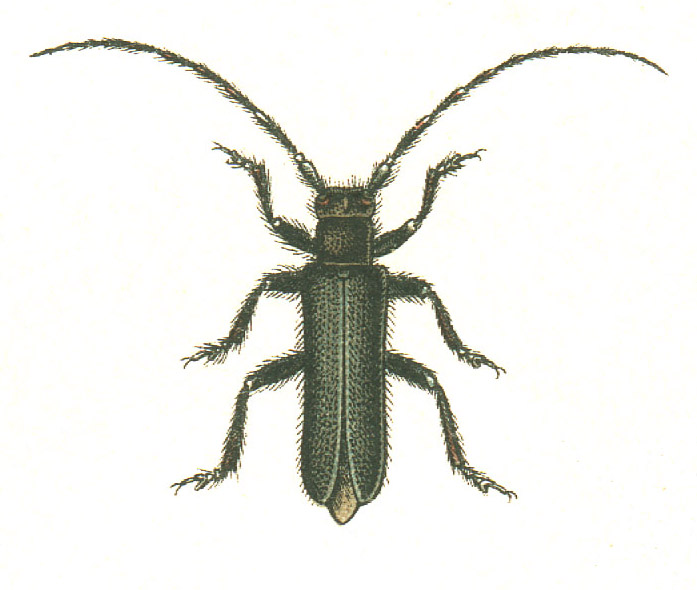

Scientific classification
- Domain: Eukaryota
- Kingdom: Animalia
- Phylum: Arthropoda
- Class: Insecta
- Order: Coleoptera
- Suborder: Polyphaga
- Infraorder: Cucujiformia
- Family: Cerambycidae
- Genus: Stenostola
- Species: S. ferrea

Binomial name
- Stenostola ferrea (Schrank, 1776)

Synonyms
- Saperda plumbea Bonelli, 1812; Cerambyx ferreus Schrank, 1776; Stenostola nigripes (Fabricius, 1792) (misidentification); Stenostola dubia (Laicharting, 1784) (misidentification)

= Stenostola ferrea =

Species of beetle

Stenostola ferrea is a species of beetle in the family Cerambycidae. It was described by Schrank in 1776, originally under the genus Cerambyx. It has a wide distribution throughout Europe. It feeds on Juglans regia.

== Subspecies ==
- Stenostola ferrea maculipennis Holzschuh, 1982
- Stenostola ferrea ferrea (Schrank, 1776)
