= Gumaga =

Scientific classification
- Kingdom: Animalia
- Phylum: Arthropoda
- Clade: Pancrustacea
- Class: Insecta
- Order: Trichoptera
- Family: Sericostomatidae
- Genus: Gumaga; Tsuda, 1938

Genus of caddisflies

Gumaga is a genus of bushtailed caddisflies in the family Sericostomatidae. There are about six described species in Gumaga.

The type species for Gumaga is Gumaga okinawaensis M. Tsuda.

== Species ==
These six species belong to the genus Gumaga:

- Gumaga griseola (McLachlan, 1871)
- Gumaga hesperus (Banks, 1914)
- Gumaga nigra (Mosely, 1938)
- Gumaga nigricula (McLachlan, 1871)
- Gumaga orientalis (Martynov, 1935)
- Gumaga quyeni Malicky, 1995
