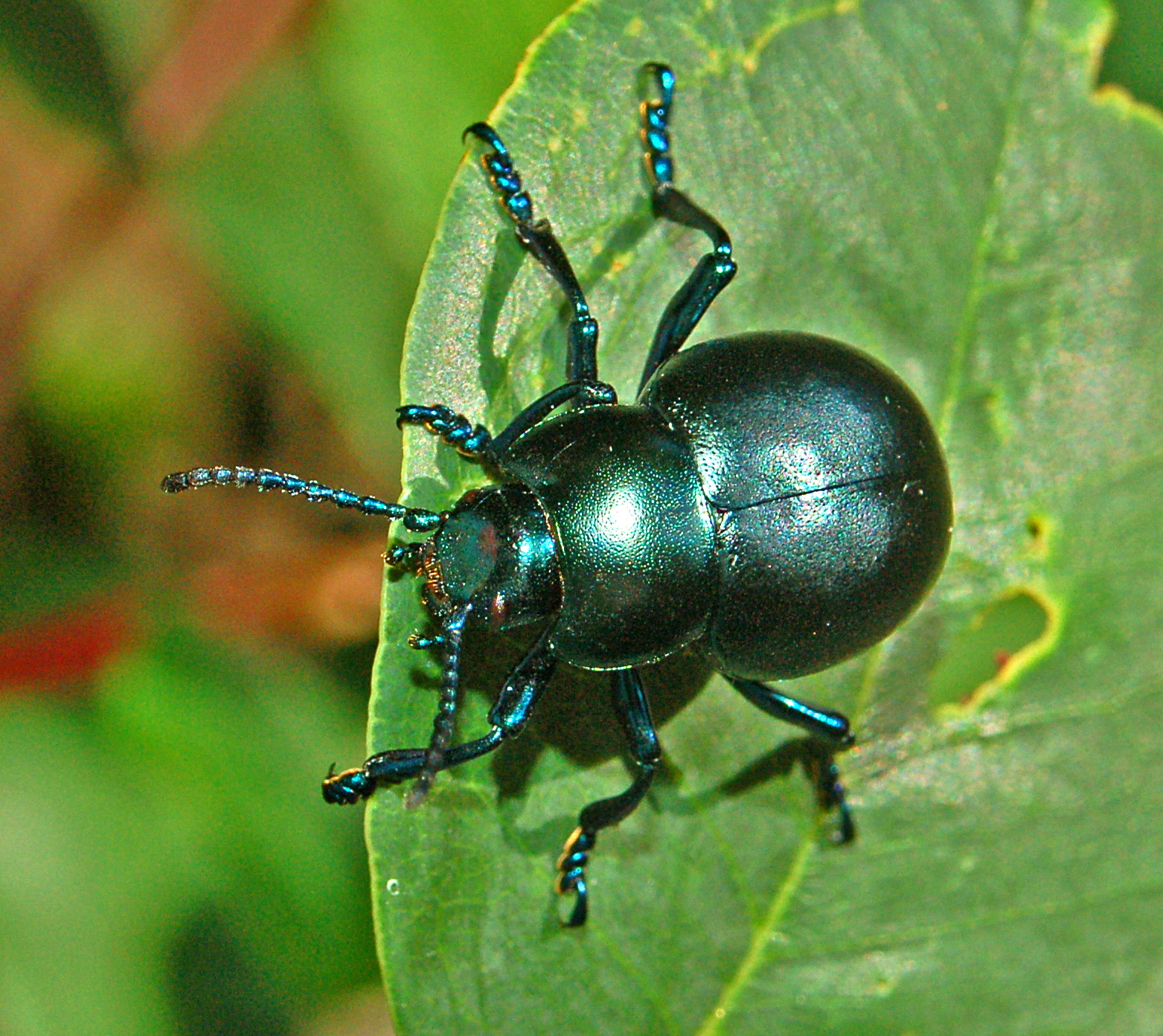
- Timarcha tenebricosa

Scientific classification
- Kingdom: Animalia
- Phylum: Arthropoda
- Clade: Pancrustacea
- Class: Insecta
- Order: Coleoptera
- Suborder: Polyphaga
- Infraorder: Cucujiformia
- Family: Chrysomelidae
- Subfamily: Chrysomelinae
- Tribe: Timarchini; Motschulsky, 1860
- Genus: Timarcha; Samouelle, 1819

Type species
- Chrysomela tenebricosa Fabricius, 1775

= Timarcha =

Genus of beetles

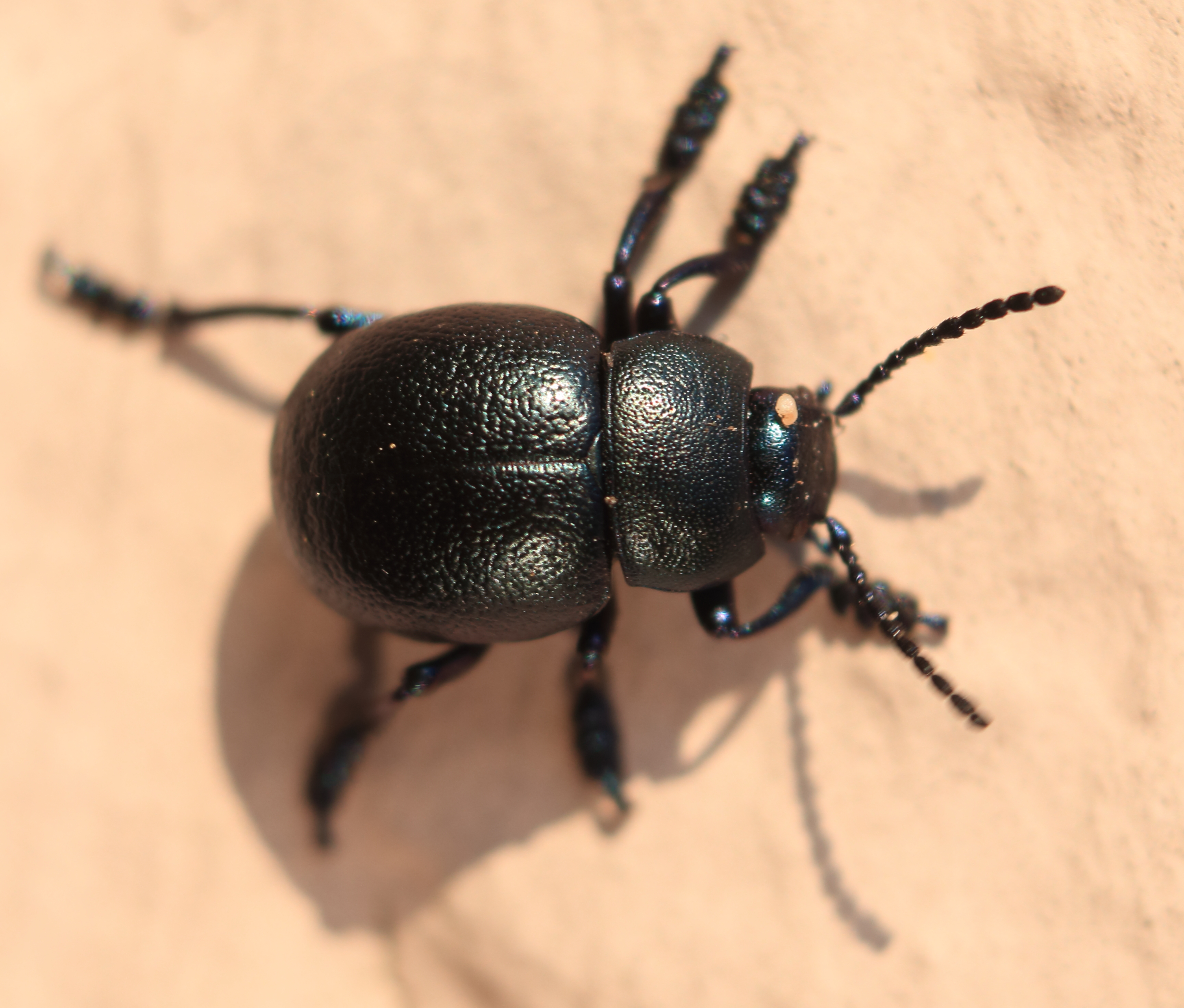
Timarcha goettingensis

Timarcha is a genus of leaf beetles in the family Chrysomelidae, with more than 100 described species in three subgenera. The most widely known species is T. tenebricosa, the bloody-nosed beetle. All species are black, wingless organisms. Timarcha are herbivorous species, living mostly on plants belonging to Rubiaceae and Plumbaginaceae, although a few can feed on Brassicaceae and Rosaceae. Timarcha is the only member of the tribe Timarchini.

== Species ==
These 20 species belong to the genus Timarcha:

- Timarcha affinis Laboissière, 1937^{g}
- Timarcha cerdo Stål, 1863^{i c g}
- Timarcha cornuta Bechyné, 1944^{g}
- Timarcha cyanescens Fairmaire, 1862^{g}
- Timarcha coarcticollis Fairmaire, 1873^{g}
- Timarcha daillei Laboissière, 1939^{g}
- Timarcha goettingensis (Linnaeus, 1758)^{g}
- Timarcha insparsa
- Timarcha interstitialis Fairmaire, 1862^{g}
- Timarcha intricata Haldeman, 1853^{i c g b}
- Timarcha italica Herrich-Schäffer, 1838^{g}
- Timarcha lugens
- Timarcha marginicollis
- Timarcha maritima Perris, 1855^{g}
- Timarcha metallica (Laicharting, 1781)^{g}
- Timarcha monticola Dufour, 1851^{g}
- Timarcha nicaeensis A.Villa & G.B.Villa, 1835^{g}
- Timarcha obsoleta Laboissière, 1937^{g}
- Timarcha recticollis Fairmaire, 1862^{g}
- Timarcha sardea (Villa, 1835)^{g}
- Timarcha sinuatocollis Fairmaire, 1862^{g}
- Timarcha strangulata Fairmaire, 1862^{g}
- Timarcha temperei Jeanne, 1965^{g}
- Timarcha tenebricosa (Fabricius, 1775)^{g} (Bloody-nosed beetle)

Data sources: i = ITIS, c = Catalogue of Life, g = GBIF, b = Bugguide.net
