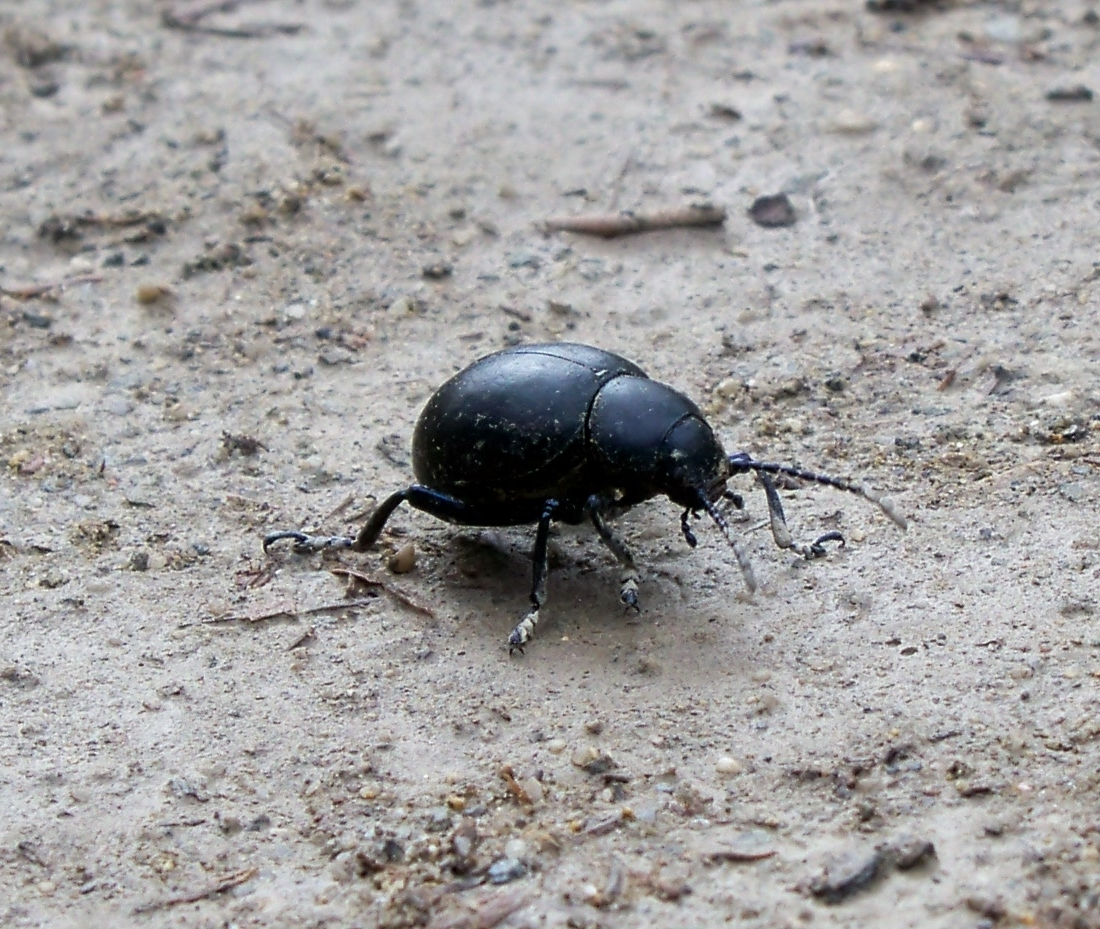

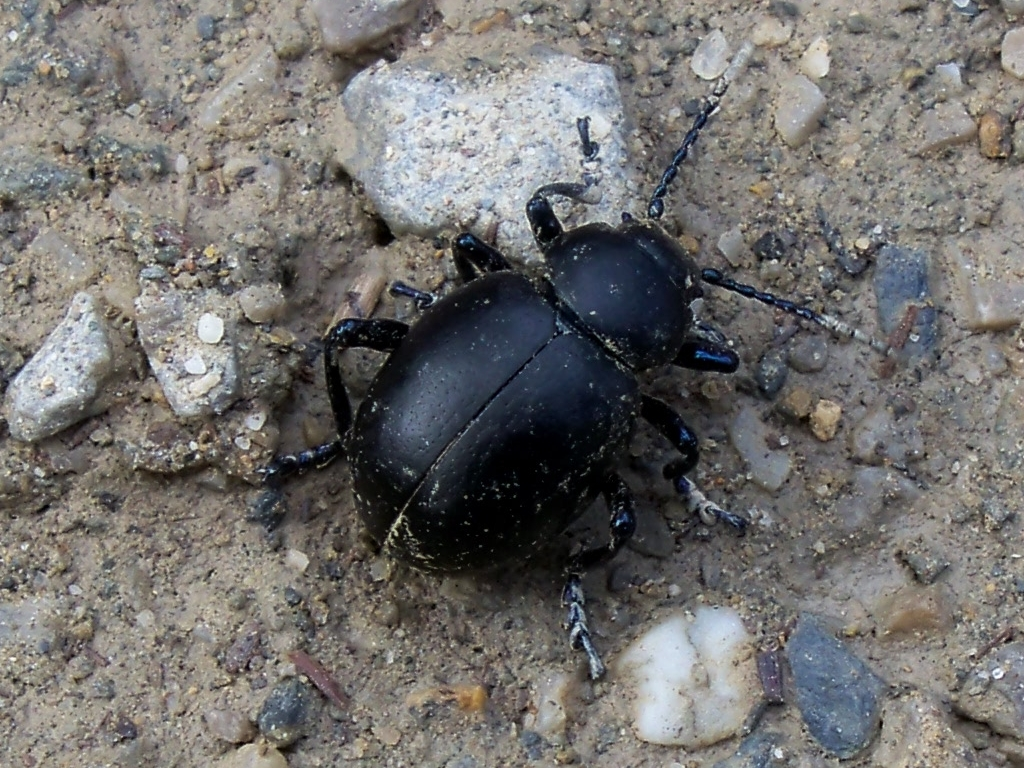

Scientific classification
- Kingdom: Animalia
- Phylum: Arthropoda
- Clade: Pancrustacea
- Class: Insecta
- Order: Coleoptera
- Suborder: Polyphaga
- Infraorder: Cucujiformia
- Family: Chrysomelidae
- Genus: Timarcha
- Species: T. coarcticollis

Binomial name
- Timarcha coarcticollis (Fairmaire, 1873)

= Timarcha coarcticollis =

Species of beetle

Timarcha coarcticollis is a species of beetle in the family leaf beetles.

Timarcha coarcticollis was first described scientifically in 1873 by Fairmaire.
