= Garth Christian =

- Born: Garth Hood Christian; 2 August 1921; Riddings, Derbyshire, England
- Died: 26 November 1967 (aged 46); North Chailey, Sussex
- Occupations: Journalist, editor, author
- Writing career
- Period: 1950s–60s
- Genres: Conservation, natural history

Garth Hood Christian (2 August 1921 – 26 November 1967) was an English nature writer, editor, teacher and conservationist.

== Life ==
Christian was born in 1921 to Rev. Frederick Ewan Christian and Ethel Marian Trower Rogers in the Riddings, Derbyshire vicarage which had been occupied by his father and maternal grandfather, Rev. Henry Rogers, for almost 50 years. He was a member of the same family as Fletcher Christian. At the age of 18, he began contributing to The Guardian's "Miscellany" column.

After becoming a full-time freelance writer, he wrote for newspapers and magazines including the Birmingham Post, Birmingham Evening Mail, Nottingham Guardian, The Times, Country Life and New Scientist. From 1950, he was editor of The Plough.

He wrote a number of books on conservation and ornithology, one of which, Down the Long Wind, had a jacket illustrated by Peter Scott.

As a school governor, he took the unusual step of becoming an honorary (unpaid) teacher of biology, one afternoon a week.

He died suddenly, aged 46, at his home in Beggar's Wood, North Chailey, Sussex.

== Positions ==
- Nature conservator, Chailey Common
- Council member, Sussex Archaeological Society
- Council member, Sussex Naturalists' Trust
- County Secondary School governor

== Bibliography ==
- Christian, Garth (1958). A place for animals. A plea for the preservation of wild life and the establishment of nature sanctuaries. London. p. 256.
- Hawker, James; Garth Christian (1961). A Victorian Poacher James Hawker's Journal. Oxford: Oxford University Press. ISBN 0-19-281255-6.
- Christian, Garth (1961). Down the Long Wind - a study of bird migration. London: Newnes. p. 240.
- Christian, Garth (1963). While some trees stand. London. p. 192.
- Christian, Garth (1965). Wings of Light. An anthology for bird-lovers. London: Newnes. p. 178.
- Christian, Garth (1966). Tomorrow's countryside: the road to the seventies. London: Murray. p. 229.
- Christian, Garth (1967). The Country Life countryman's pocketbook. London: Country Life. p. 303.
- Christian, Garth (1967). Ashdown Forest. Forest Row: Society of the Friends of Ashdown Forest. p. 78.
- Christian, Garth. "Wild mammals of the metropolis". Country Life.
