= Chailey School =

Community school in East Sussex, England

Location
- Mill Lane; South Chailey, East Sussex, BN8 4PU; England; 50°56′21″N 0°01′37″W

Information
- Type: Community school
- Established: 1958
- Local authority: East Sussex
- Specialists: Language and humanities
- Department for Education URN: 114594 Tables
- Ofsted: Reports
- Headteacher: Paul Holt
- Gender: Mixed
- Age: 11 to 16
- Enrolment: 852
- Houses: Ashdown Forest, Mount Caburn, Ditchling, Firle, Glynde
- Colours: Navy Blue and Sky Blue
- Website: http://www.chaileyschool.org

Chailey Secondary School is a comprehensive secondary school located in the village of South Chailey, Chailey, just outside Lewes in East Sussex, UK. It opened in April 1958. Chailey School was awarded specialist Language College Status in July 2002. In the year 2007, the school was also awarded Humanities College status. The school also provides adult classes in French, Italian, and Spanish. It does not have a sixth form.

In recent years the school has been substantially rebuilt, with little of the old buildings remaining.

In 2007 at least 99% of students acquired one GCSE at grades A*–G and in 2009, 82% of students achieved 5 or more A*–C grades with 72% achieving 5 or more including English and maths. The school academic program spans a range of disciplines including arts, sciences or humanities.

The current head teacher is Paul Holt.

In 2008 it celebrated its 50th anniversary since opening as a secondary modern in 1958. On 6 June 2008, The Duchess of Gloucester visited the school to attend a citizenship ceremony, the first of its kind to be held in a school with students present. This was to coincide with the school's 50th anniversary.

== Houses ==
The house groups, known as forms, are named after local hills and landmarks. The most forms in a year group has been seven. The original four houses were Caburn, Chanctonbury, Ditchling and Firle

- Ashdown
- Ditchling
- Firle
- Weald (only used for year groups with six forms or more, currently only the classes of 2011, 2015 and 2016)
- Keymer (only used for year groups with seven forms)
- Caburn
- Glynde

== Notable former pupils ==
- Piers Morgan, television presenter and former Daily Mirror editor
- Perou, fashion, portrait and music photographer
- Cleo Demetriou, So Awkward actor
