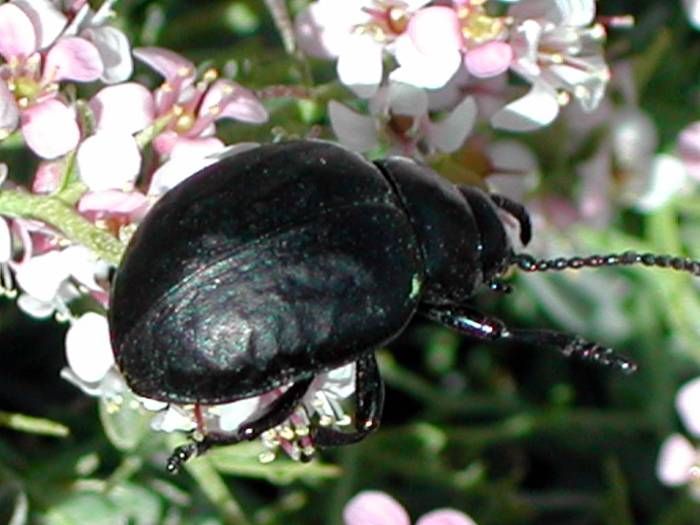

Scientific classification
- Kingdom: Animalia
- Phylum: Arthropoda
- Clade: Pancrustacea
- Class: Insecta
- Order: Coleoptera
- Suborder: Polyphaga
- Infraorder: Cucujiformia
- Family: Chrysomelidae
- Genus: Timarcha
- Species: T. lugens

Binomial name
- Timarcha lugens Rosenhauer, 1856

Synonyms
- Timarcha gravis Rosenhauer, 1856

= Timarcha lugens =

Species of leaf beetle

Timarcha lugens (Chrysomelidae) is a wingless leaf beetle endemic to the high mountains of the Sierra Nevada (Spain). The genus Timarcha comprises a group of herbivorous species, widely distributed in Europe, Turkey, North Africa and Western North America, which inhabit a broad range of habitats, including high mountains, humid forests and sandy coastal areas. In the Iberian Peninsula, Timarcha is represented by more than 25 species, some of them inhabiting montane regions. In the Sierra Nevada, this genus is represented by four species, although only three of them, T. lugens, T. insparsa Rosenh., and T. marginicollis Rosenh., occur over 2,400 m (7,900 ft) altitude. While T. lugens and T. insparsa are endemic species of the Sierra Nevada mountains, T. marginicollis is also present in other mountain ranges in southern Spain. T. lugens distribution area spans from 2,400 to 3,200 metres (7,900 to 10,500 feet) above sea level, being the most abundant chrysomelid at these high-altitudes.

== Food habits ==
Timarcha lugens is strictly monophagous on Hormathophylla spinosa (Brassicaceae), a stunted shrub abundant in many West Mediterranean high mountains. This beetle feeds on leaves, flower buds, flowers and fruits.

== Life cycle ==
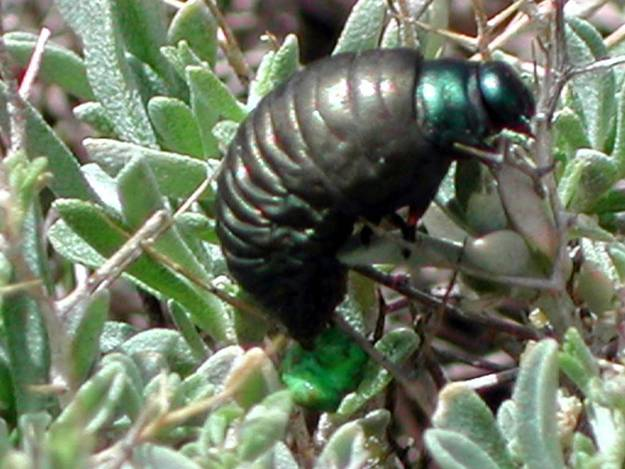
T. lugens larva

The life cycle of T. lugens is completed in two years. Adults start their activity soon after snowmelt and are active until the beginning of autumn (end of September in the Sierra Nevada). Most adults that are active at the beginning of the season are the individuals that emerged the preceding year and have survived the winter in diapause. Mating and egg laying occur along the whole period of adult activity. At the end of the summer, approximately 15 days to one month before the snow has completely covered the study area, individuals start overwintering under large plants or stones. Overwintering is common in species of Timarcha, as well as other chrysomelids, and it occurs in most high mountain species, which are active only during the warmest period of the year. The short periods of activity (usually restricted to summertime) limits the breeding season to a few months in which these species have to maturate reproductive organs, mate, breed, and develop.

Although adults lay eggs during the whole summer, larval activity is restricted to a short period (early to late June) after snowmelt. This restricted period of activity of larvae seem to indicate that eggs go through an obligatory diapause, hatching the following year. When larvae have completed their development, they bury themselves into the soil under a plant and excavate a chamber for pupation. Approximately a month after larval activity has finished and pupation started, new adults emerge in the population, suggesting that pupation is completed in less than a month. In addition, some pupae might go through a period of hibernation.

== Conservation ==
Timarcha lugens is nowadays one of the most conspicuous endemic beetles of the high mountains of the Sierra Nevada. The conservation strategies to preserve the biodiversity of this high-mountain habitat are effective only if they are based on broad and accurate scientific knowledge. T. lugens is a singular organism in being monophagous on a common mountain cruciferous, and functioning as a keystone species in this community. Furthermore, T. lugens is an endemic species of a unique ecosystem within one of the world's biodiversity hot spots. However, due to several characteristics of its ecology and the management practices currently conducted in the Sierra Nevada, the short- and long-term conservation of this chrysomelid is threatened.

First, T. lugens is monophagous on the shrub H. spinosa. Unfortunately, the broad use of the high mountains to develop ski facilities leads to the removal of almost every plant taller than 15 cm (5.9 in). This results in the total elimination of the H. spinosa shrubs in those places where the ski runs are arranged. Furthermore, T. lugens is distributed only above 2,500 m (8,200 ft) altitude, the part of the Sierra Nevada where ski is most intensely practiced. An aggressive development of ski will surely provoke a strong decrease in the abundance of H. spinosa and, therefore, in the abundance of T. lugens.

Second, since ungulates overcompete T. lugens, an increase in ungulate populations, produced to favour the use of mountain raising lands (domestic ungulates) or to attract more tourists (wild ungulates), could also cause a decrease in T. lugens population. Finally, the establishment of human settlements in the upper parts of the mountains (mostly associated to the ski resorts) is producing a gradual change in the microclimatic conditions in certain zones of the Sierra Nevada.

In addition, the predicted global change will also affect the mountains, producing an upward altitudinal displacement of the environmental conditions. It is presumed that T. lugens, being a strict high mountain species, will be negatively affected by these micro- and macroclimatic changes.
