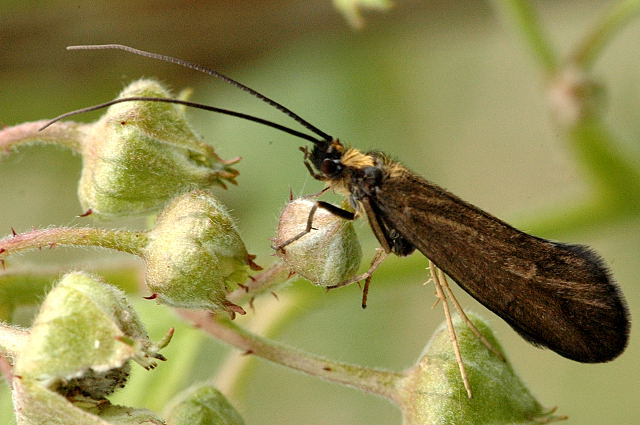
- Sericostoma personatum

Scientific classification
- Kingdom: Animalia
- Phylum: Arthropoda
- Clade: Pancrustacea
- Class: Insecta
- Order: Trichoptera
- Family: Sericostomatidae
- Genus: Sericostoma; Latreille, 1825

= Sericostoma =

Genus of caddisflies

Sericostoma is a genus of bushtailed caddisflies, family Sericostomatidae. The genus is distributed in the western Palaearctic.

== Species ==
There are 33 recognized species:

- Sericostoma alakir Sipahiler, 2021
- Sericostoma baeticum Pictet, 1856
- Sericostoma bergeri Malicky, 1973
- Sericostoma carinthiacum McLachlan, 1868
- Sericostoma cianficconii Moretti in Moretti & Cianficconi, 1978
- Sericostoma clypeatum Hagen, 1864
- Sericostoma cristatum Navas, 1924
- Sericostoma dimcay Sipahiler, 2021
- Sericostoma faciale McLachlan, 1868
- Sericostoma flavicorne Schneider, 1845
- Sericostoma galeatum Rambur, 1842
- Sericostoma grusiense Martynov, 1913
- Sericostoma herakles Malicky, 1999
- Sericostoma ida Sipahiler, 2000
- Sericostoma indivisum McLachlan, 1880
- Sericostoma italicum Moretti in Cianficconi, 1978
- Sericostoma maclachlanianum Costa, 1884
- Sericostoma medium Navas, 1917
- Sericostoma memorabile McLachlan, 1876
- Sericostoma mesopotamicum McLachlan, 1898
- Sericostoma pedemontanum McLachlan, 1876
- Sericostoma personatum (Kirby & Spence, 1826)
- Sericostoma pinargozu Sipahiler, 2021
- Sericostoma pyrenaicum Pictet, 1865
- Sericostoma scheiderii (Kolenati, 1848)
- Sericostoma selysii Pictet, 1865
- Sericostoma siculum McLachlan, 1876
- Sericostoma subaequale McLachlan, 1898
- Sericostoma taskent Sipahiler, 2021
- Sericostoma timidum Hagen, 1864
- Sericostoma turbatum McLachlan, 1876
- Sericostoma vittatum Rambur, 1842
- Sericostoma yuvarlakcay Sipahiler, 2021
