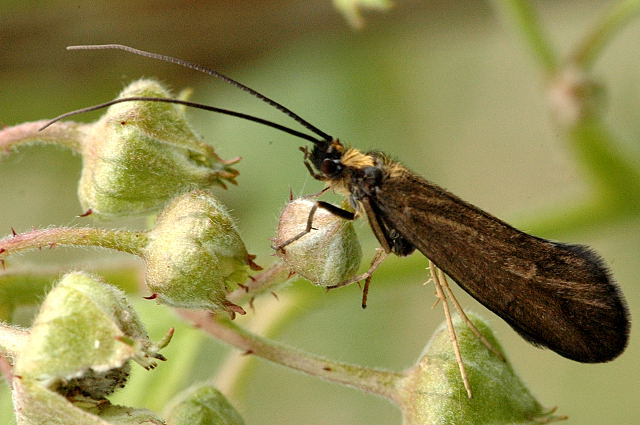
- Sericostoma personatum

Scientific classification
- Kingdom: Animalia
- Phylum: Arthropoda
- Clade: Pancrustacea
- Class: Insecta
- Order: Trichoptera
- Superfamily: Sericostomatoidea
- Family: Sericostomatidae; Stephens, 1836

= Sericostomatidae =

Family of caddisflies

Sericostomatidae is a family of bushtailed caddisflies in the order Trichoptera. There are about 19 genera and at least 90 described species in Sericostomatidae.

The type genus for Sericostomatidae is Sericostoma P.A. Latreille, 1825.

== Genera ==
- Aclosma Morse, 1974
- Agarodes Banks, 1899
- Asahaya Schmid, 1991
- Aselas Barnard, 1934
- Cerasma McLachlan, 1876
- Cheimacheramus Barnard, 1934
- Chiloecia Navas, 1930
- Fattigia Ross & Wallace, 1974
- Grumicha Mueller, 1879
- Gumaga Tsuda, 1938
- Myotrichia Schmid, 1955
- Notidobia Stephens, 1829
- Notidobiella Schmid, 1955
- Oecismus McLachlan, 1876
- Parasericostoma Schmid, 1957
- Petroplax Barnard, 1934
- Rhoizema Barnard, 1934
- Schizopelex McLachlan, 1876
- Sericostoma Latreille, 1825
