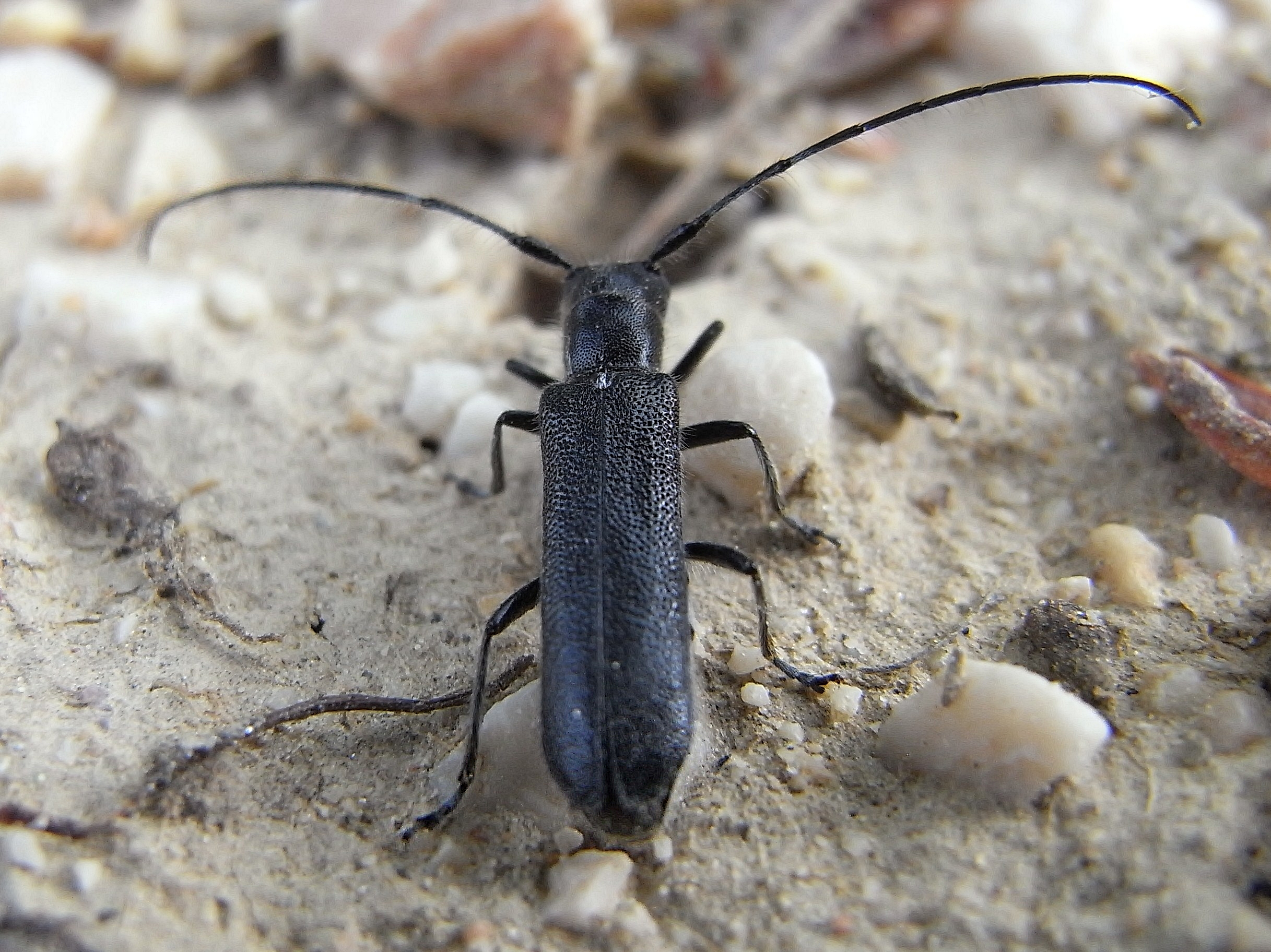

Scientific classification
- Kingdom: Animalia
- Phylum: Arthropoda
- Clade: Pancrustacea
- Class: Insecta
- Order: Coleoptera
- Suborder: Polyphaga
- Infraorder: Cucujiformia
- Family: Cerambycidae
- Genus: Stenostola
- Species: S. dubia

Binomial name
- Stenostola dubia (Laicharting, 1784)

Synonyms
- Stenostola tiliae Küster, 1846; Stenostola ferrea (Schrank, 1776) (misidentification); Saperda nigripes Fabricius, 1792; Saperda dubia Laicharting, 1784; Saperda ferrea (Schrank, 1776) (misidentification)

= Stenostola dubia =

Species of beetle

Stenostola dubia is a species of beetle in the family Cerambycidae. It was described by Laicharting in 1784, originally under the genus Saperda. It has a wide distribution throughout Europe. It feeds on Juglans regia and Corylus avellana.

S. dubia measures between 10 and 13 mm (0.39 and 0.51 in).
