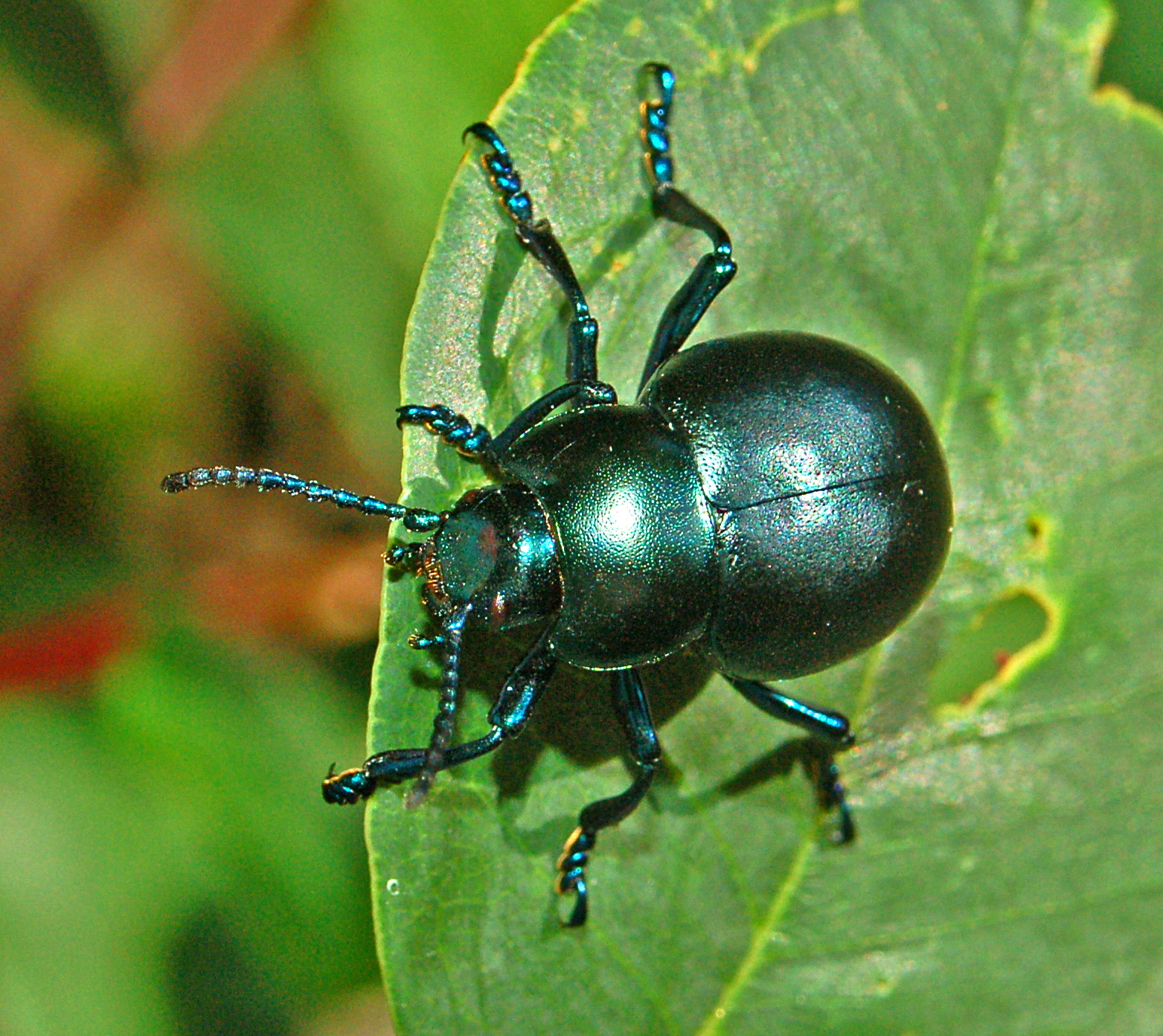
- Dorsal view
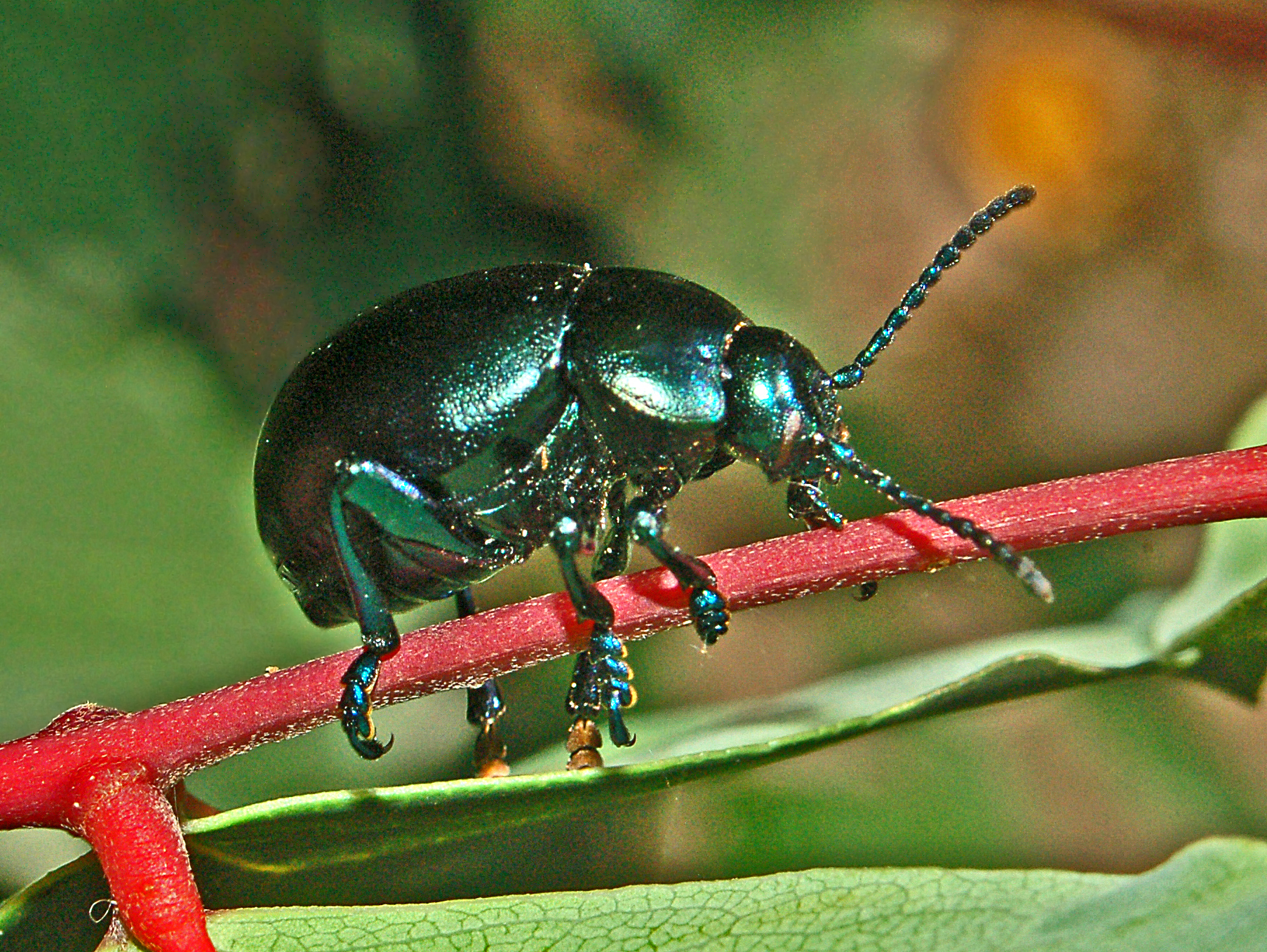
- Lateral view

Scientific classification
- Kingdom: Animalia
- Phylum: Arthropoda
- Clade: Pancrustacea
- Class: Insecta
- Order: Coleoptera
- Suborder: Polyphaga
- Infraorder: Cucujiformia
- Family: Chrysomelidae
- Genus: Timarcha
- Species: T. tenebricosa

Binomial name
- Timarcha tenebricosa (Fabricius, 1775)

= Bloody-nosed beetle =

Species of beetle

The bloody-nosed beetle (Timarcha tenebricosa), also called blood spewer or blood-spewing beetle, is a leaf beetle native to Europe.

== Description ==
T. tenebricosa measures 15–20 mm in length, is blue-black in colour and is both larger and more constricted on the base of its pronotum than the visually similar T. goettingensis (the lesser bloody-nosed beetle). The body is strongly curved, and elytra smooth and finely punctuated. Its antennae are thick and well segmented, its legs have long tarsi and terminate with a double hook.

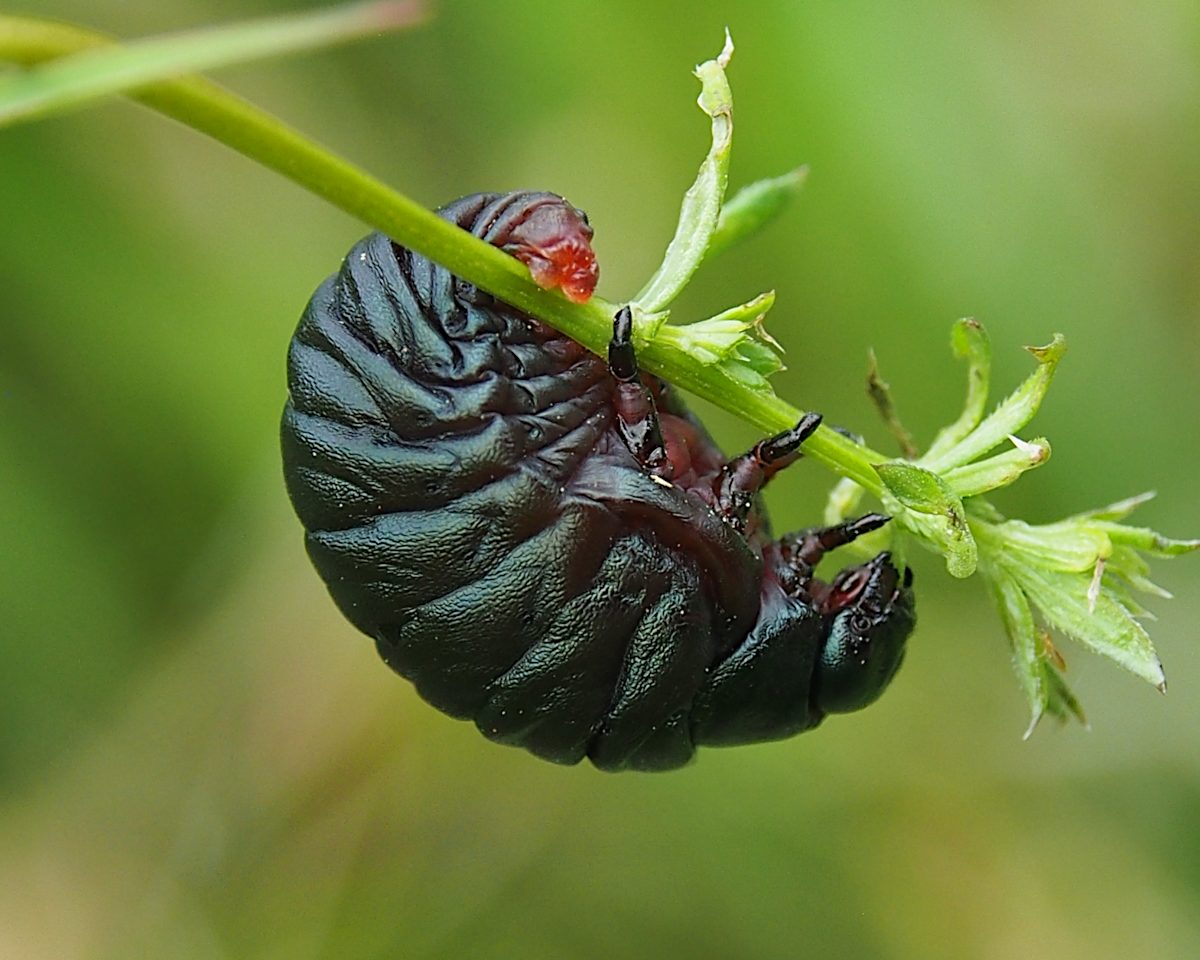
Larva

== Diet and behaviour ==
Timarcha tenebricosa is monophagous; the larvae feed exclusively on bedstraws, especially species with tender leaves (such as Galium verum and Galium mollugo). The adult beetles usually move slowly on the ground, in the grass and herbaceous plants, mainly at night.

As a defensive behaviour, they exude droplets of their bright red-orange hemolymph by breaking thin membranes in their mouth, which is foul-tasting to predators. This phenomenon of reflex bleeding exists in some other insects, such as ladybugs.

== Lifestyle ==
Eggs are laid in spring on bedstraw. Larvae may measure up to 20 mm and are blue-black in colour. The pupae overwinter.

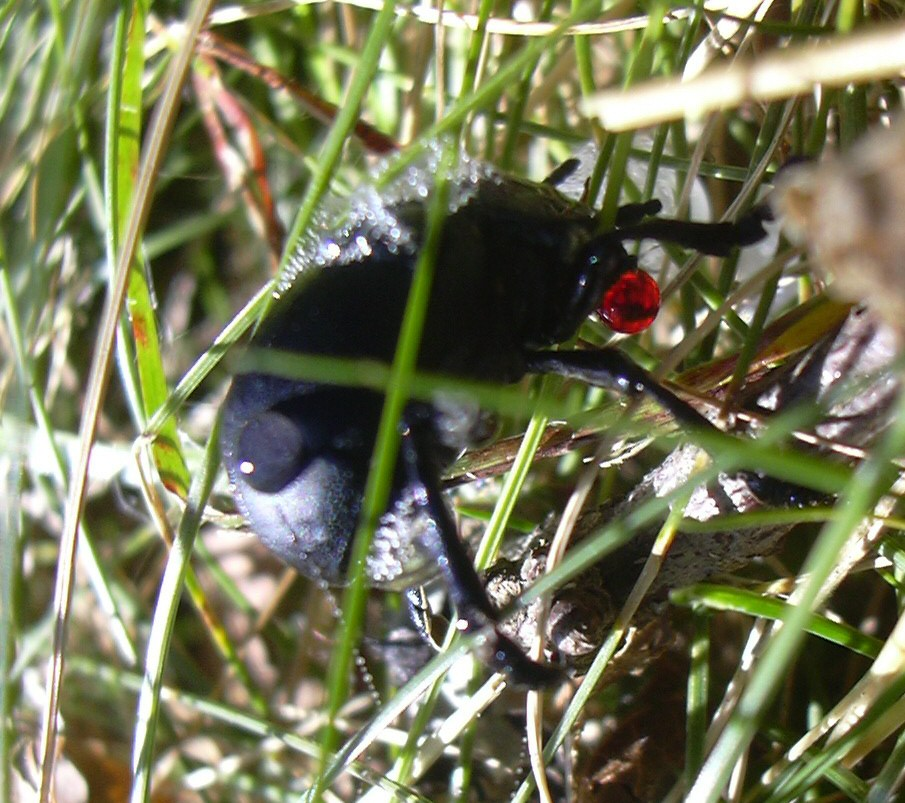
A bloody-nose beetle exuding a drop of noxious red liquid.

== Distribution ==
The beetle can be found in southern and central Europe, and is common in Britain and Ireland.
