= Wings Place =

Country house in England

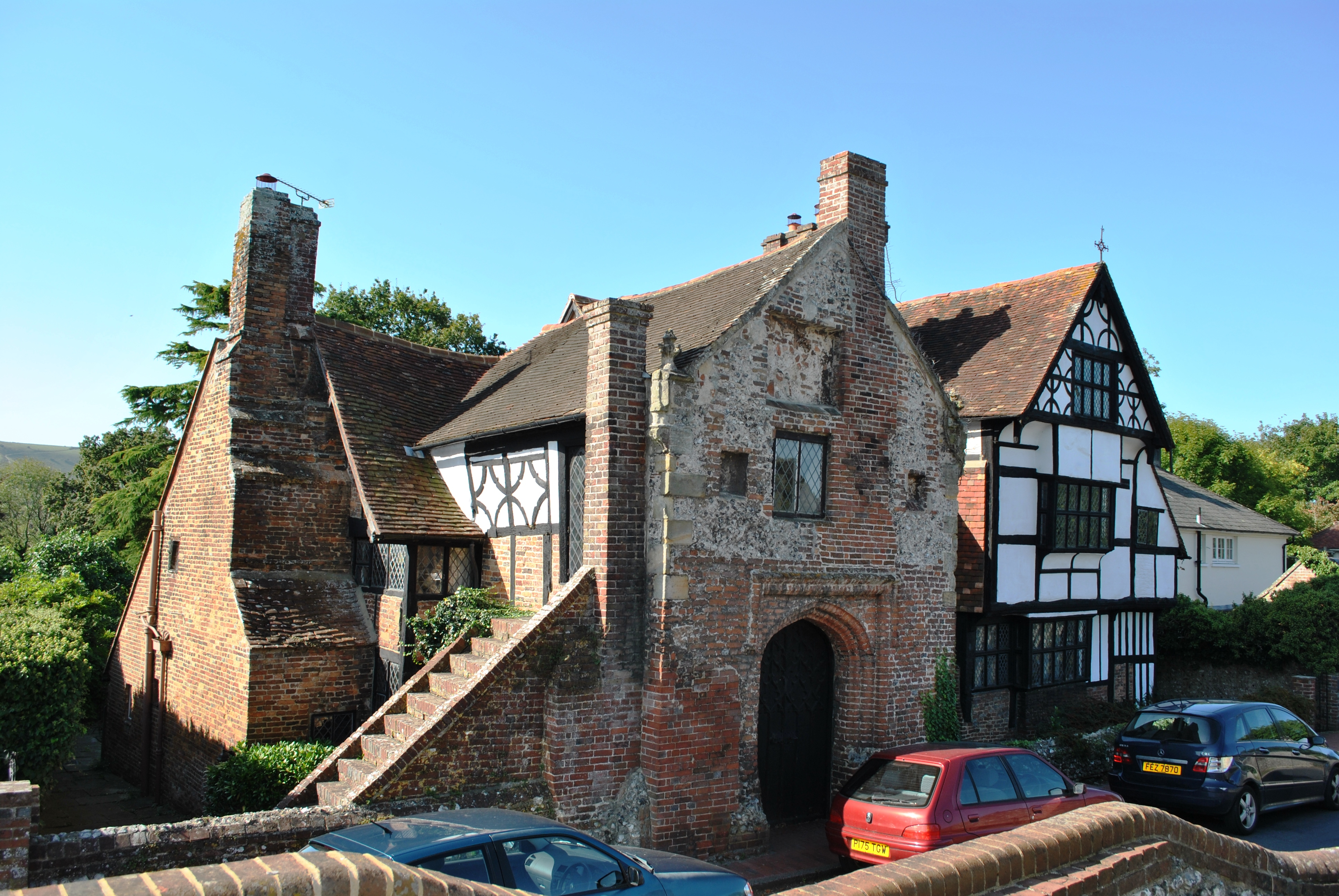
- Wings Place

- Location within East Sussex
- Former names: Ditchling Garden Manor
- Alternative names: Anne of Cleves House

General information
- Architectural style: Tudor
- Classification: Grade I listed
- Location: Ditchling, East Sussex, United Kingdom
- Coordinates: 50°55′16″N 0°6′59″W

Technical details
- Material: Timber frame, Pegtile roof

Wings Place, formerly Ditchling Garden Manor, also known as Anne of Cleves House, is a Grade I country house in Ditchling, East Sussex, England. It is a Tudor house, said to be one of the best examples in the country.

== History ==
Wings Place was one of the properties which was part of the manor of Ditchling Garden, one of five manors in the parish of Ditchling. Ditchling Garden Manor dates to 1095 or earlier, when it was mentioned as part of the Priory of St Pancras in Lewes and was described as a "garden with houses and the land which is between the two roads, with the wood adjoining it". After the Dissolution of the Monasteries, Henry VIII came into possession of it and granted Anne of Cleves the estate following their divorce. After her death in 1557, it was given back to the Crown, but by the 1570s it was owned by Henry Poole, a former Member of Parliament for the rotten borough of Wootton Bassett, who had moved to Ditchling after his marriage. Poole died in 1580, and the house may have been rebuilt after that: its present appearance is largely 16th-century.

The Browne family acquired the property in 1688, and later residents included William Pitt and the Duke of Wellington. The rooms in the upper floors also were the venue for conducting secret Catholic services. During the Brownes' ownership, part of the house was converted into a public library. By the mid-19th century, the building was divided into cottages or tenements, but in 1936 it was restored to its original layout as a single house after being auctioned the previous year.

In 1947 the property was purchased by the Mayor of Lewes, William (Bill) Ewart Witcher along with his wife Madeleine, the Mayoress. They formed a private members club there, with Madeleine as manager. The top floors were used as staff accommodation, and the basement as a kitchen.

Later in the 20th century, it was owned for about 30 years by a reclusive American businessman and then for about 10 years by television presenter Jamie Theakston, who put it on sale in 2014 for a reported £2 million. After the asking price was reduced in early 2015, Theakston completed the sale in August 2015.

The original name of the house was Ditchling Garden Manor, reflecting its position as the manor house of the estate of that name. It later became known as Wings Place, but the name Anne of Cleves House has been used interchangeably for many years. When it was given listed status in 1952, the list description named it "Wings Place (Anne of Cleves House)". Writing in 1947, one author referred to it as "Anne of Cleves' House, or Wings Place as it was sometimes called in the past". The Buildings of England series refers to it solely as "Wings Place". Anne of Cleves never lived in the house, although local tradition claims that she did. It was just one of many manors granted to her by Henry VIII, including that of Southover, near Lewes, where there is another Anne of Cleves House.

Wings Place was listed at Grade I on 17 March 1952. Such buildings are defined as being of "exceptional interest" and greater than national importance. As of February 2001, it was one of 31 Grade I listed buildings, and 1,250 listed buildings of all grades, in the district of Lewes.

== Architecture and features ==
The architectural historian Nikolaus Pevsner described the house as "eminently picturesque in a watercolourist’s way". Other descriptions include "the most spectacular house ... in a village full of antiquity" and "a noble Tudor building ... the pride of the village". Particularly in the 19th and early 20th centuries, local stories claimed the present building was much older than its 16th-century vintage: a former vicar of St Margaret's Church recalled residents telling him it was built by Alfred the Great or by William de Warenne's wife Gundrada and when it was auctioned in 1894 the sale documents repeated the Alfred the Great myth. The building was originally larger, however: the surviving section forms the western part of the original house.

The house faces St Margaret's Church and is oriented north–south on West Street, on which it is the only building to "[make] a major effect". There are projecting wings to the west and east, of which the latter has a brick entrance porch with an ogee-headed hood mould above an arch. This may have been moved here from an older building. The building is largely late-16th-century and is of timber frame construction filled with plasterwork, and with some brickwork and studding to the ground floor. The western part of the upper storey is jettied, supported on brackets and bressummers. Above this is an oriel window and a decorative gable with bargeboards.

With more than 5,000 square feet (460 m^{2}) of living space, it has five bedrooms over three floors, with a sitting room, library, study and drawing room on the ground floor, which have high ceilings. The hall at the entrance has arched forms with space for ceiling. Part of the walls on the ground floor are built with bricks. Windows are of the casement type. The roof is fixed with tiles.

== Bibliography ==
- Antram, Nicholas; Pevsner, Nikolaus (2013). Sussex: East with Brighton and Hove. The Buildings of England. London: Yale University Press. ISBN 978-0-300-18473-0.
- Meynell, Esther (1974) [1947]. Sussex. County Books. London: Robert Hale and Company. ISBN 0-7091-2617-4.
- Swinfen, Warden; Arscott, David (1984). Hidden Sussex. Brighton: BBC Radio Sussex. ISBN 0-9509510-0-5.
