= James Hodson =

James Hodson may refer to:

- James Hodson (cricketer) (1808–1879), English cricketer
- James Lansdale Hodson (1891–1956), British novelist, scriptwriter and journalist
- James Stephen Hodson (1816–1890), British academic and Anglican priest
- Jimmy Hodson (1880–1938), English footballer

== See also ==
- James Hodson Anderson (1909–1996), American politician and lawyer
