= Hunston, West Sussex =

Village and parish in West Sussex, England

Coordinates: 50.81066°N 0.77687°W

Hunston
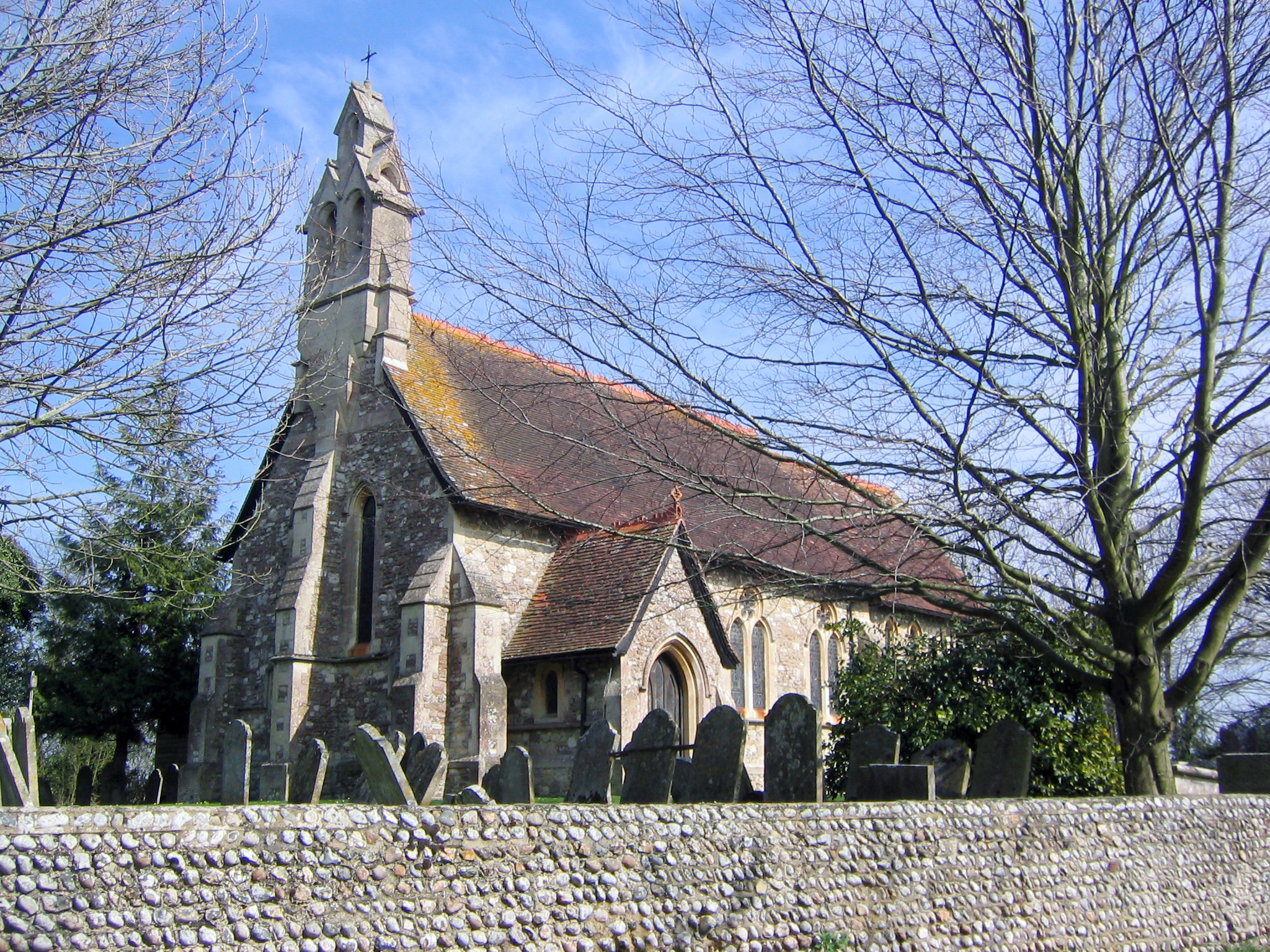
- Church of St. Leodegar

- Location within West Sussex
- Area: 4.62 km^{2} (1.78 sq mi)
- Population: 1,257. 2011 Census
  - Density: 241/km^{2} (620/sq mi)
- OS grid reference: SU862019
  - London: 56 miles (90 km) NNE
- Civil parish: Hunston
- District: Chichester
- Shire county: West Sussex
- Region: South East
- Country: England
- Sovereign state: United Kingdom
- Post town: CHICHESTER
- Postcode district: PO20
- Dialling code: 01243
- Police: Sussex
- Fire: West Sussex
- Ambulance: South East Coast
- UK Parliament: Chichester
- Website: http://hunstonparishcouncil.gov.uk

Hunston is an Anglican parish and civil parish in the Chichester district of West Sussex, England. It lies on the B2145 Road two miles (3.2 km) south of Chichester.

== History ==
Hunston was listed in the Domesday Book of 1086 in the Hundred of Stockbridge as having 24 households, one mill, one pound and two salthouses, with a value of 4 pounds.

In 1861, the population was 176 and parish extended to 1,003 acres (406 ha).

== Listed buildings ==
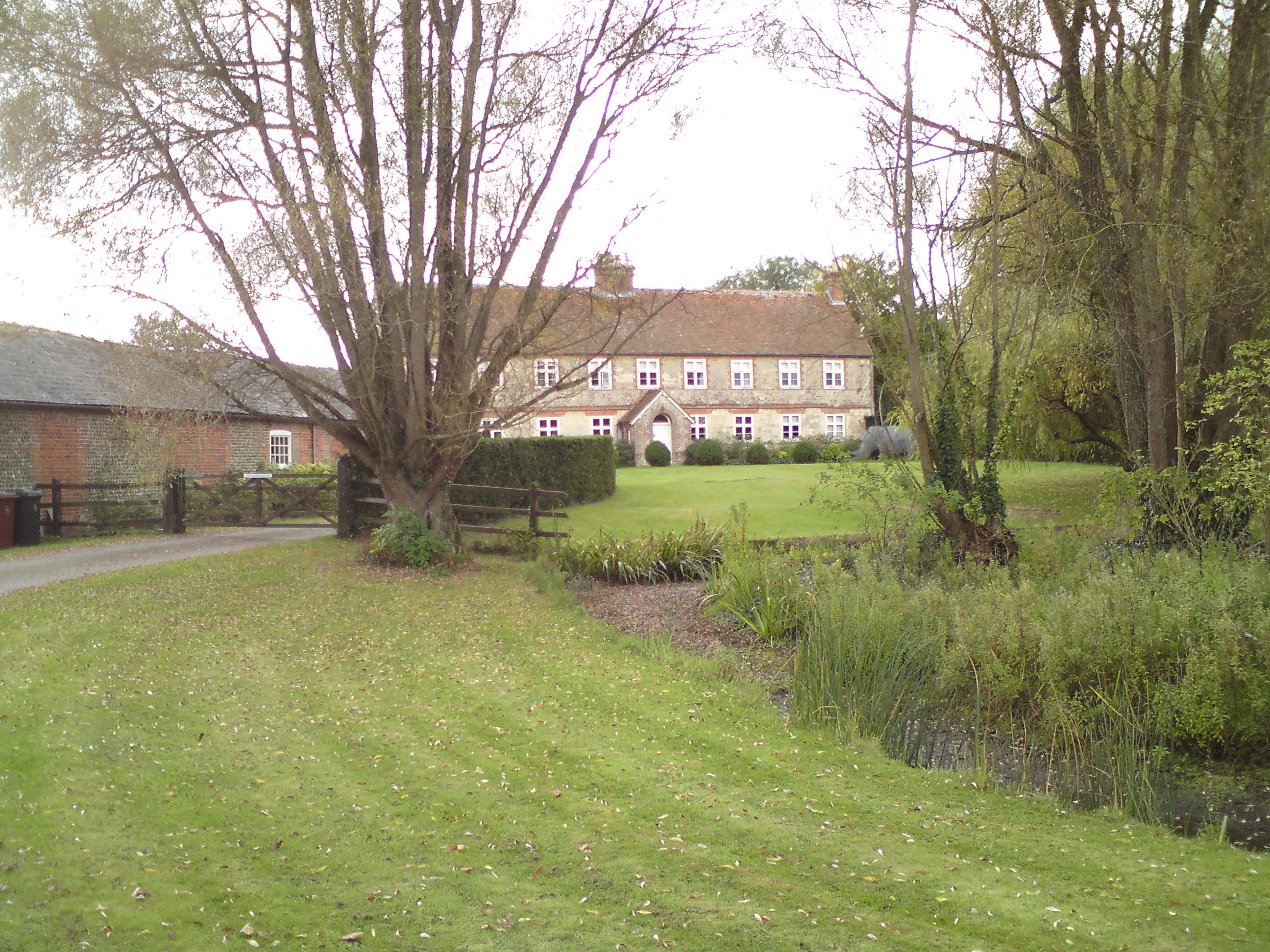
The Manor House

There are eight listed buildings in the parish: The Manor House is 18th century with later additions and is listed Grade II*, while the others buildings are listed Grade II, and include the 17th century rectory.

== Parish church ==
The parish church of St Leodegar is not a listed building, but has been thoroughly researched since Sir Arthur Blomfield's extensive restoration in 1885 from the 12th century ruin. The Anglican parish is in the Diocese of Chichester.

== Notable people ==
James Hodson (1808-1879), first class cricketer who died at Hunston Mill in 1879.

Ellis Brown (1939-1997), professional golfer and chess IM lived in Hunston from 1945 to 1962.
