= Ditchling =

Village and parish in East Sussex, England

Coordinates: 50.92°N 0.11°W

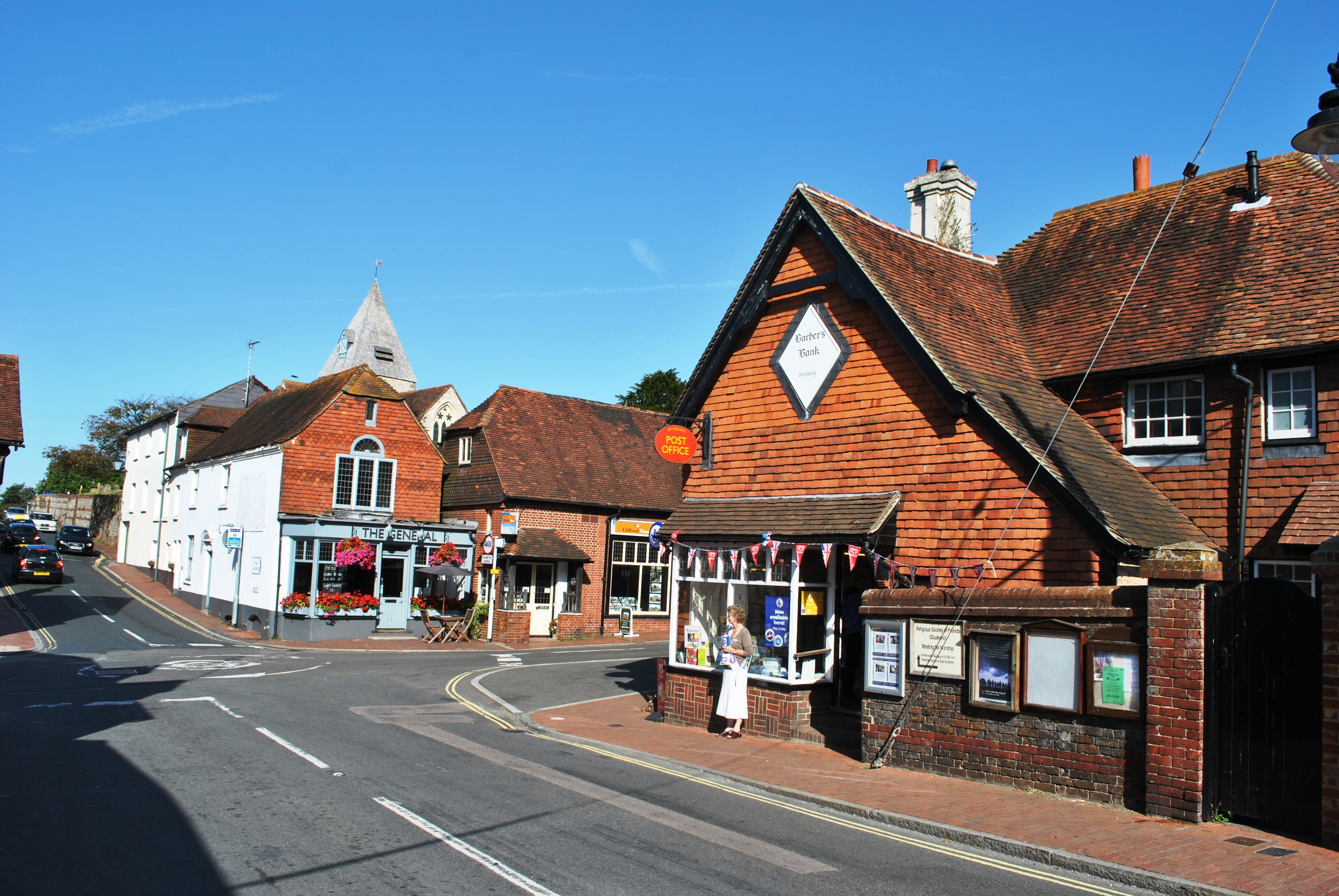
- Village main road (Lewes Road) with post office and general store

- Location within East Sussex
- Area: 15.49 km^{2} (5.98 sq mi)
- Population: 2,265 (2021 Census)
  - Density: 339/sq mi (131/km^{2})
- OS grid reference: TQ325151
  - London: 50 miles (80 km) N
- District: Lewes
- Shire county: East Sussex
- Region: South East
- Country: England
- Sovereign state: United Kingdom
- Post town: Hassocks
- Postcode district: BN6
- Dialling code: 01273
- Police: Sussex
- Fire: East Sussex
- Ambulance: South East Coast
- UK Parliament: Lewes

Ditchling is a village and civil parish in the Lewes District of East Sussex, England. The village is contained within the boundaries of the South Downs National Park; the order confirming the establishment of the park was signed in Ditchling. There are two public houses, The Bull and The White Horse; two cafes, The Nutmeg Tree and The Green Welly; a post office, florist, delicatessen and other shops. Ditchling has community groups and societies, including the Ditchling Film Society and the Ditchling Singers.

Ditchling is approximately 7 miles (11 km) north of Brighton, 20 miles (32 km) northwest of Eastbourne, 30 miles (48 km) east-southeast of Hastings, and 28 miles (45 km) east of Chichester. The parish had a population of 2,265 at the 2021 census.

== Location ==
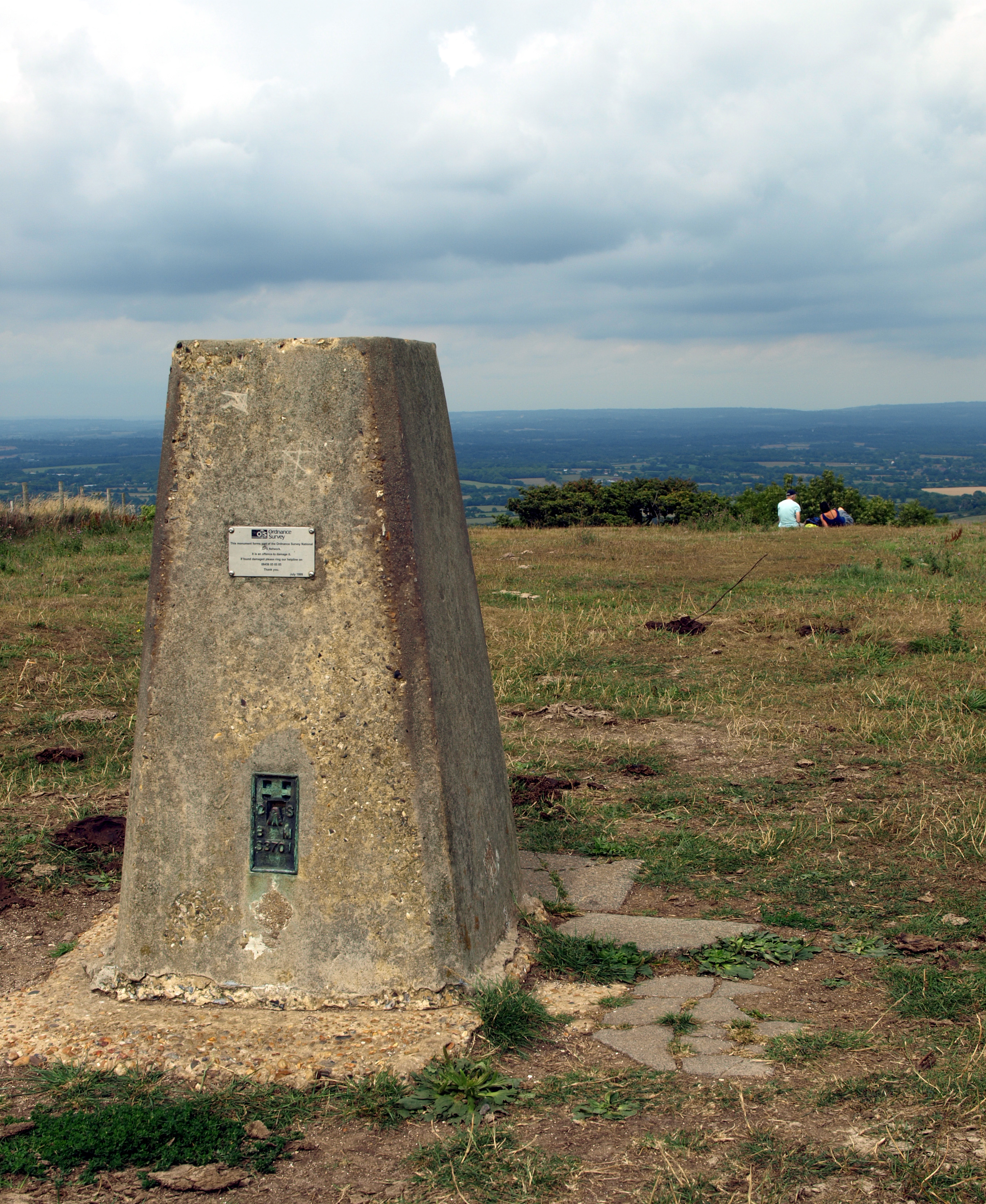
Trig Point at Ditchling Beacon

The village lies at the foot of the South Downs in East Sussex, but very close to the border with West Sussex. The settlement stands around a crossroads with Brighton and Hove to the south, Burgess Hill and Haywards Heath to the north, Keymer and Hassocks to the west, and Lewes to the east, and is built on a slight spur of land between the Downs to the south and Lodge Hill to the north. Ditchling Beacon, one of the highest points on the South Downs, overlooks the village.

Ditchling Common, north of the village, is the source of the eastern River Adur.

== Etymology ==
The earliest known appearance of the name is Dicelinga in AD 765, and was subsequently known as Dicelingas, Diccelingum, Dyccanlingum, Diceninges, Dicelinges, Digelinges, Dicheninges, Dicheling, Dichelyng, Dechelyng, Dichening(e), Dichyning(e), Digining, Dechenyng, Dichlinge, Dicheling, Dichening, Dychenynge and Dytcheling. The name took its current form in the seventeenth century.

The root itself is uncertain. The Old English word dic - which means "ditch, trench or dike" would appear to be inapplicable as the town sits on a hill. It has been suggested as Dicleah but refuted. Dic may in fact be an example of epenthesis, with the original root being ichen as is found throughout southeastern Britain. (Note: Ytene is the genitive plural of Yte meaning "Jute", i.e. "of the Jutes".) Attributions to a non-historical founder named Dicul are examples of founding myths.

The suffix -ing is a cognate of inge, an ethnonym for the Ingaevones said variously to mean "of Yngvi," "family, people or followers of" or a genitive plural form of an inhabitant appellation.

== History ==
The place has been inhabited in some way or other for thousands of years. Above the village to the west is Lodge Hill (TQ 324 155) there is evidence of Mesolithic people in the form of their flint tools.

The terrace of the Roman Greensand Way passes across its south flank. Though damaged in the past, Lodge Hill's sandy pasture has sheep's sorrel and sheep's fescue in similar fashion to Sandy Field at Danny House, which the Roman Road also crosses.

=== Anglo-Saxon Ditchling ===
The original village embraced both Clayton, Keymer and Wivelsfield. In the starting centuries of the Saxon settlement it was probably the capital of several Sussex 'regio', or microkingdoms, and controlled the area between the Adur and the Ouse. Later it is recorded that the Manor and its lands were held by King Alfred the Great (871–899). Alfred left it in his will to a kinsmen named Osferth, and it reverted to the Crown under Edward the Confessor.

=== Medieval Ditchling ===
After the Norman Conquest, the land was held by William de Warenne. The Domesday Book of 1086 notes there were 196 households of which 111 were villagers, 69 were smallholders, six were burgesses and ten were slaves; land included meadows and woodland with a total value, including mill and church, of £72. In 1095 there is mention of a manor house, now Wings Place. The land passed through several hands until in 1435 it was owned by the Marquess of Abergavenny who held it until the 20th century, when it was sold to developers who failed to get planning permission to build on it.

=== Modern Ditchling ===
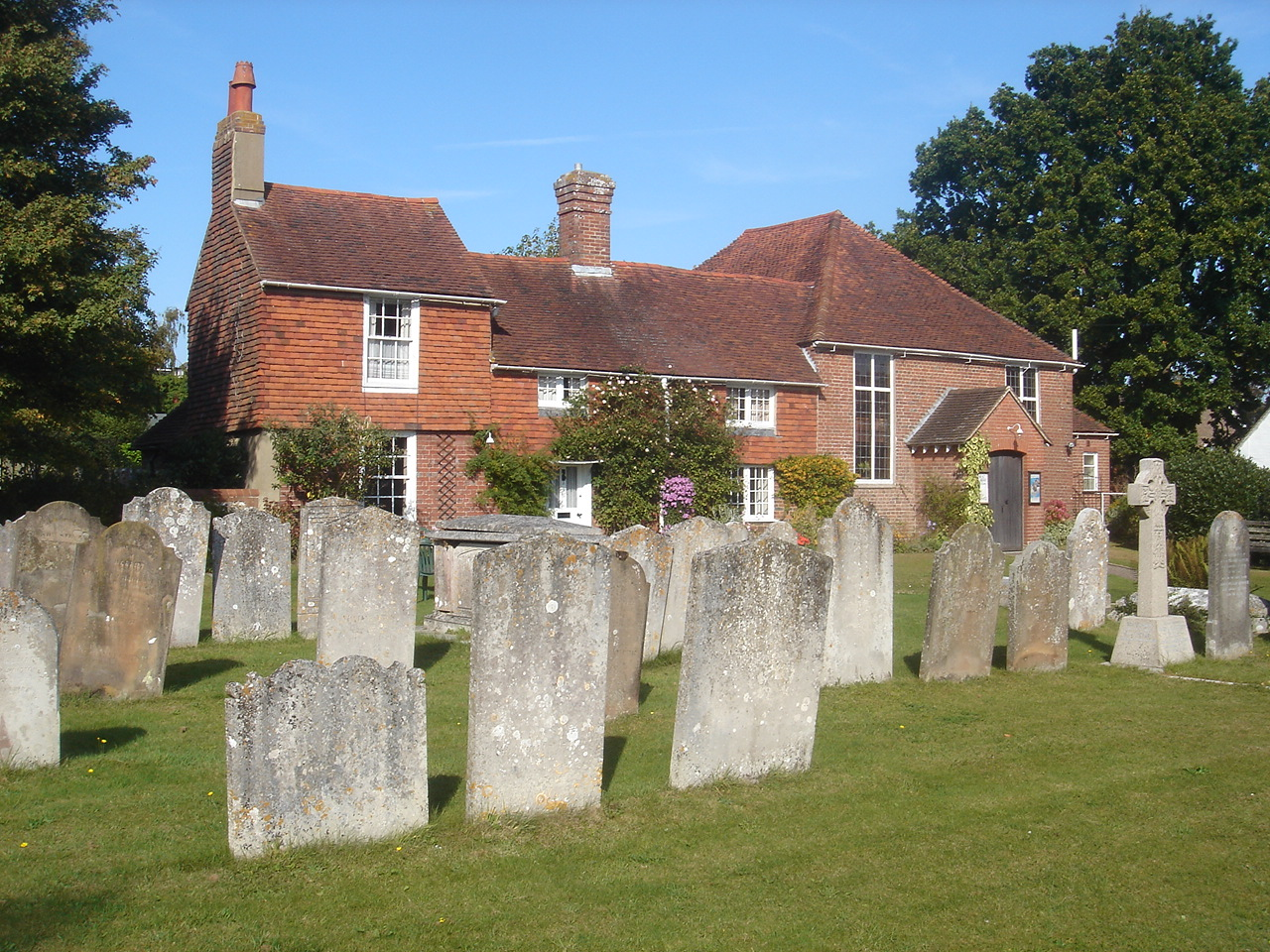
The Old Meeting House (Unitarian Chapel) and adjacent Cottage, Ditchling

In the 18th and 19th centuries the Old Meeting House in Ditchling was an important centre for Baptists from the wider area, whose records and memorandum books allow a unique insight into a small rural religious community of the period. These records (in the East Sussex Record Office) bear witness to often fractious and heated debates about morality and religion.

==== Post-war Ditchling ====
In the 1960s, Ditchling's tithe barn was dismantled and moved to Loughton, where it now forms the Corbett Theatre on the University of Essex campus there.

In January 2007, Ditchling featured in a five-part BBC Documentary entitled Storyville: A Very English Village. This was filmed, produced and directed by a Ditchling resident, but the series itself came under criticism from local residents.

In the 2017 novel Rabbitman, by Michael Paraskos, the village was the setting for a Catholic Worker anarchist commune in an imagined post-Brexit dystopia.

== Landmarks ==
There are two Sites of Special Scientific Interest within the parish of Ditchling. Ditchling Common is of biological interest because of the variety of heath grassland habitats, created by the different drainage conditions throughout the common. The second site is Clayton to Offham Escarpment, which stretches from Hassocks in the west, passing through many parishes including Ditchling, to Lewes in the East. The most famous and highest peak of this escarpment is Ditchling Beacon. This whole scarp site is of biological importance due to its rare chalk grassland habitat.

== Notable buildings and areas ==
Notable areas around Ditchling

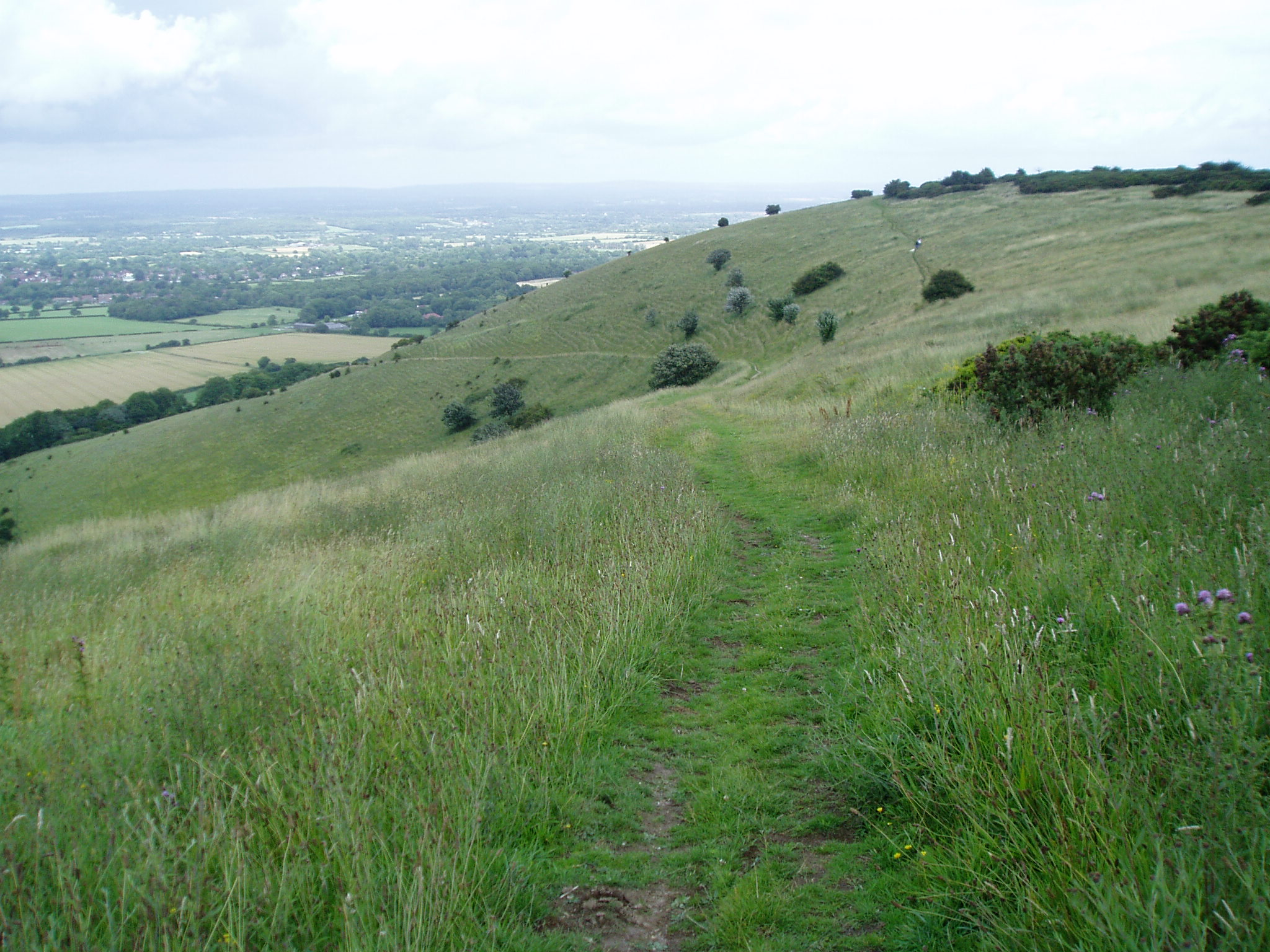
Sussex Border Path traverses Burnhouse Bostal

Unlike its neighbouring parishes, the natural world in this countryside is much more threatened by development. Much of its natural and historic cultural assets have been minimised in the face of this wave of regional overdevelopment. Ditchling Common is still holds an assemblage of wildlife which thrive on the damp Weald Clay grasslands.

Ditchling has only retained its historic integrity thanks to the fierce defence by its residents, who have thwarted a bypass scheme and various built developments. Although is oppressed by through traffic, little fields come still close into the heart of the village. At Keymer, the Tileworks Clay Pit is now lost to housing development, but it was once a place where "searchers on hands and knees found the teeth of miniature crocodiles and the scales of swampland fish".

=== Buildings ===
There are still many fine buildings in Ditchling. To the south of the church, there is a fine Tudor timber framed Wings Place with parts that are older still. There is an old drove going north from Lodge Hill which passes the lovingly restored Oldlands Mill (TQ 321 162) (just over border in Hassocks Parish), a landmark visible from the Downs ridge top along the South Downs Way.

==== Religious buildings ====
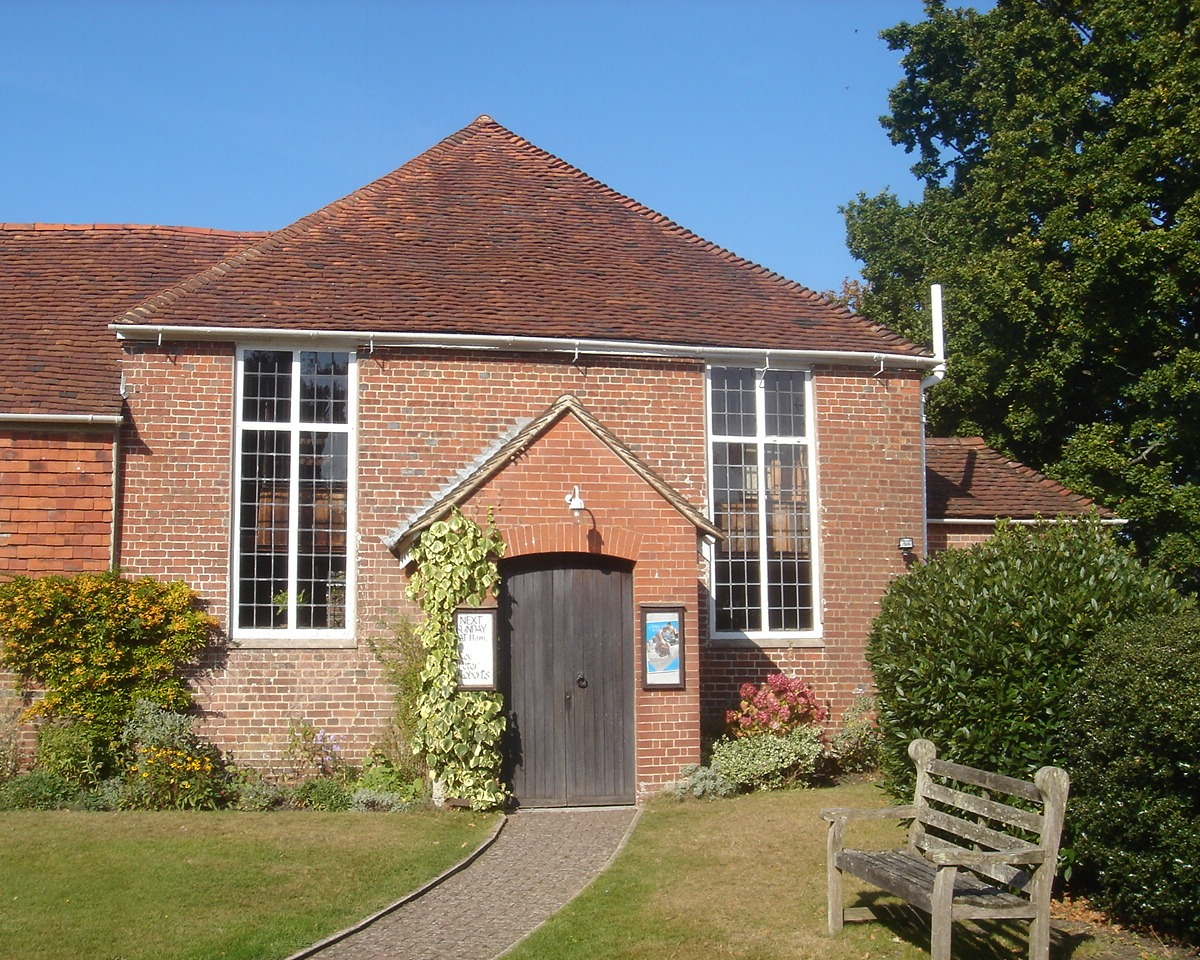
The Old Meeting House of 1740 is used by Unitarians.

Ditchling has a long history of Protestant Nonconformism. The village has four extant places of Christian worship and one former chapel.

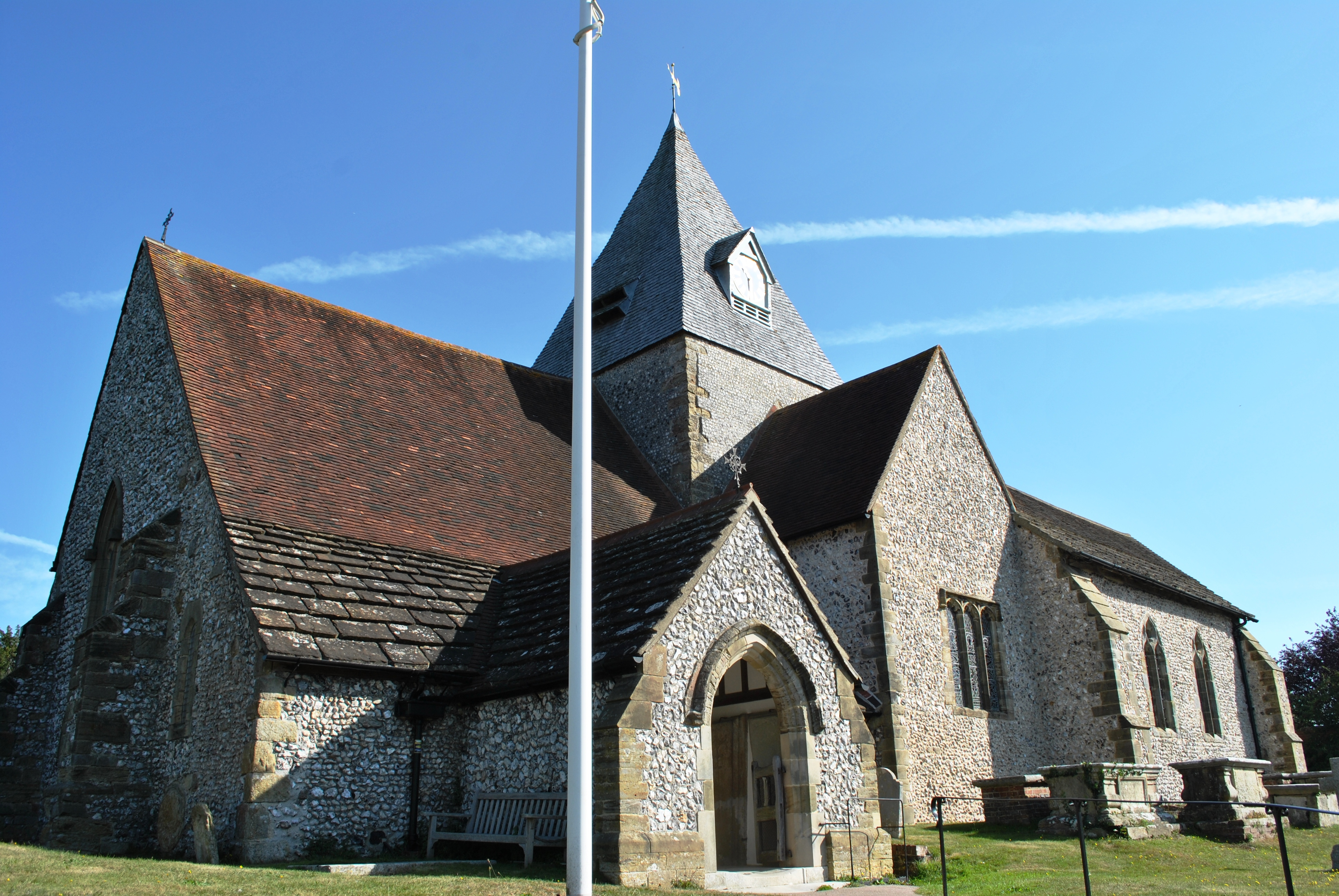
St Margaret's Church, Ditchling

St Margaret's Church, founded in the 11th century, is the village's Anglican church. The fabric of the flint and sandstone building is mostly 13th-century, although the nave is original. Its large churchyard has big patches of tiny black earthtongues, which are fungi. In 1740, a chapel (now called The Old Meeting House) was built on the side of a late 17th-century house off East End Lane. It is now used by the Unitarian community and is full of polished woodwork. Emmanuel Chapel, used by an Evangelical congregation, was built in the early 20th century but may have had a predecessor elsewhere in the village. The Quaker community have a modern meeting house near the centre of the village. The Beulah Strict Baptist Chapel (now a house, No. 9 East End Lane) was in religious use between 1867 and the 1930s. Its church occupies a knoll at the crossways of the south–north watershed between the catchments of the Adur and the Ouse, and the east-west Roman Greensand Way. A huge Sarsen boulder, like those of Stone Henge, bulges out of the rubble retaining south wall of its churchyard. It was converted into a house in 1947 by the author Esther Meynell.

==== St George's Retreat ====
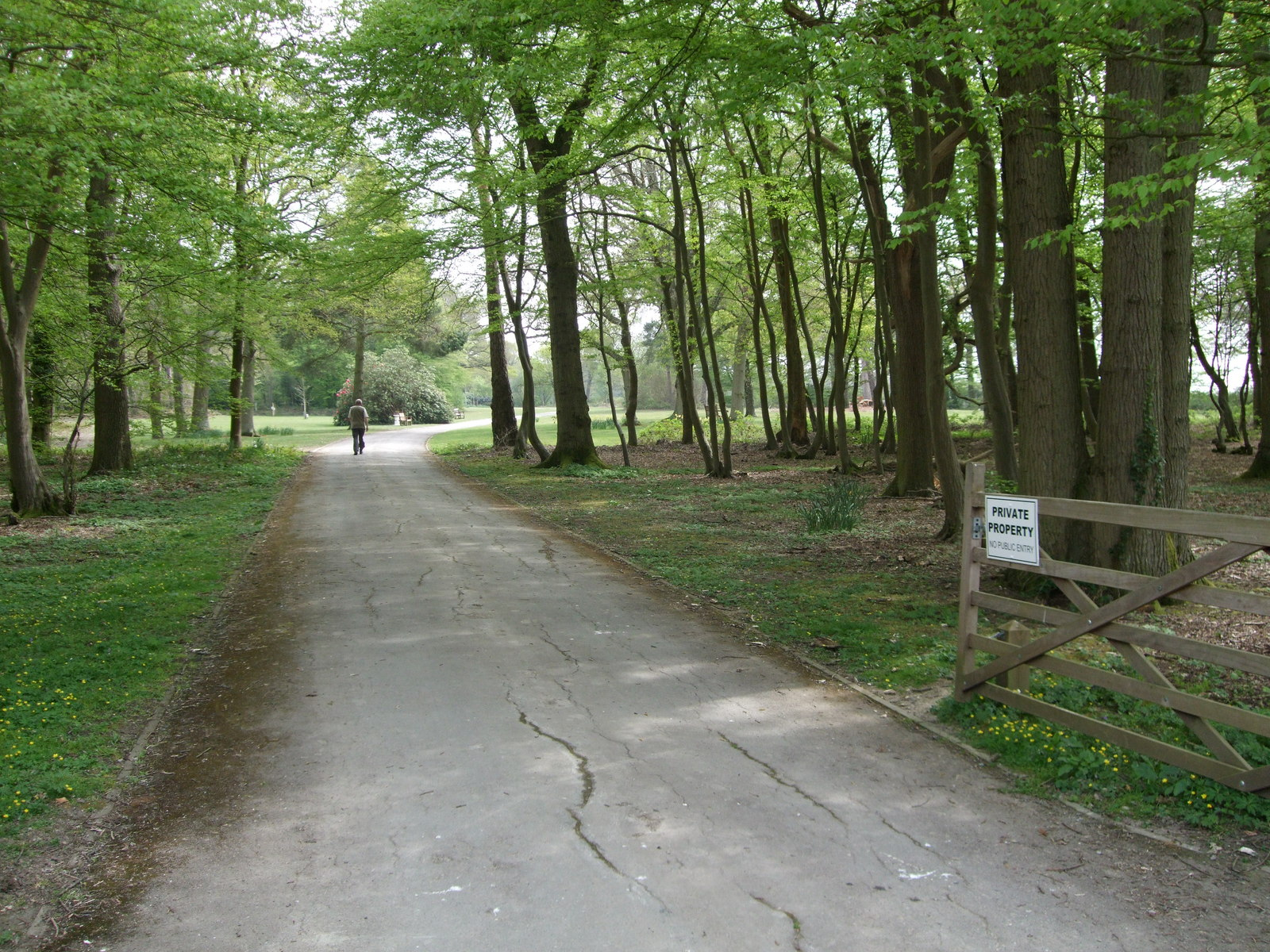
Drive to St George's retreat

St George's Retreat is a 250-acre farmed estate that run downs the Ditchling Common boundary. Their extensive grounds includes a retirement village. It was once part of Shortfrith Chase, a baronial hunting ground, which was enclosed between 1622 and 1666. The Retreat still maintains some wild areas, including four unimproved brook meadows on either side of a stream just inside their entrance from the Haywards Heath Road (TQ 336 192) that in spring host a display of green winged orchids, with occasional cowslips and spring sedge. Other herbs and grasses of archaic clay meadows flower such as more wild orchids, oxeye daisy, yellow oat grass and common cat's ear.

==== Stoneywish Country Park ====
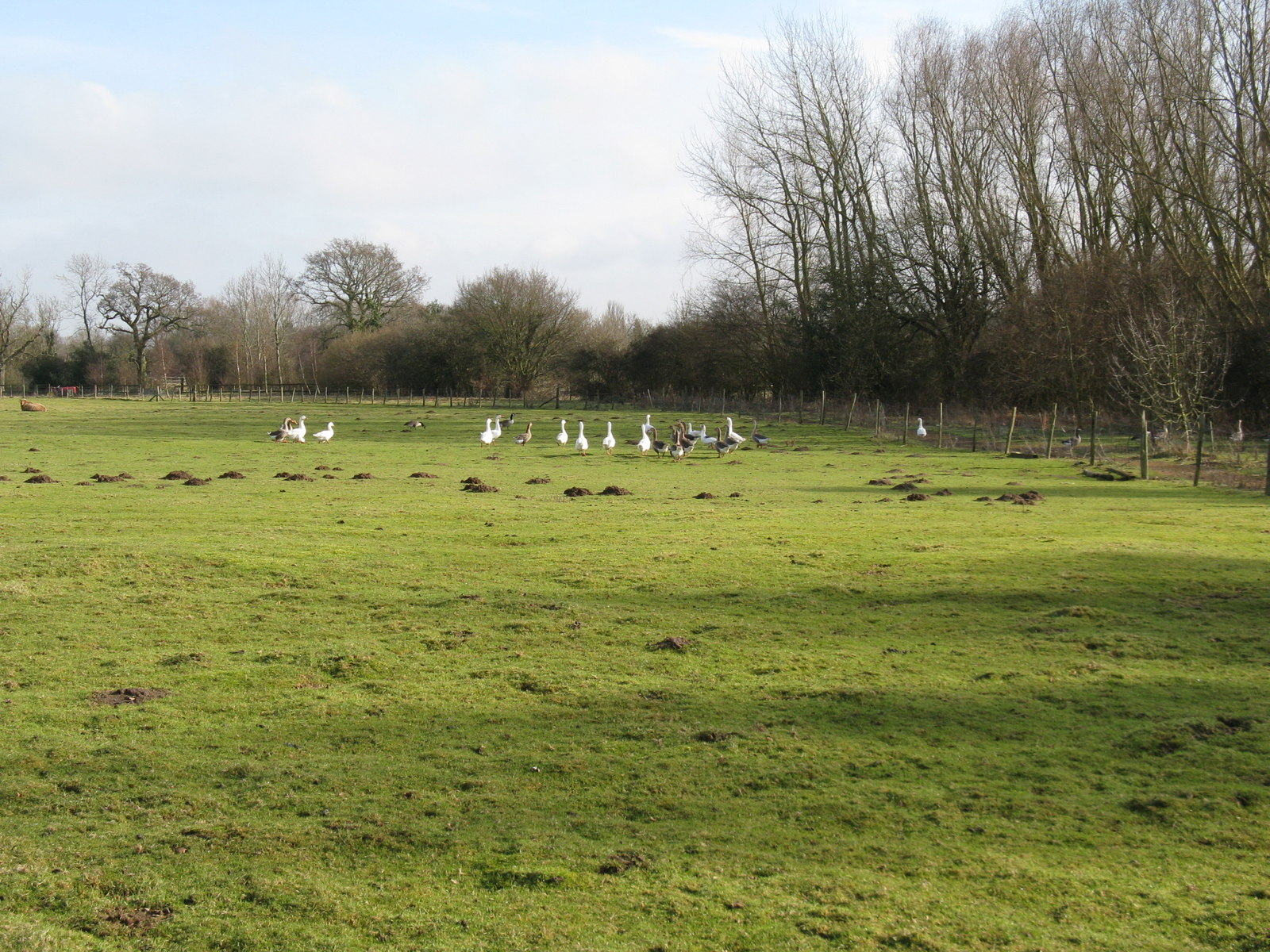
Geese at the edge of Stoneywish Country Park

Stoneywish Country Park is a paying country park. It was originally a small dairy farm call East End Farm, but the landowner has converted it and sensitively preserved the local landscape character and wildlife whist doing so. It is much loved park with many animals and camping. The field has meadow vetchling, oval and false fox sedge and are surrounded by ditches full of fleabane, meadowsweet and rushes, important archaic local plants.

==== The Guild of St Joseph and St Dominic ====
The Ditchling Museum of Art + Craft.

Eric Gill, the sculptor and letter cutter, came to Ditchling in 1907 with his apprentice Joseph Cribb and was soon followed by other craftsmen. In 1921 they founded the Guild of St Joseph and St Dominic, a Roman Catholic community of artists and craftsmen, inspired by ideas of the medieval guilds and the Arts and Crafts movement. The community had its own workshops and chapel, and thrived for many years. Its affairs were finally wound up in 1989, and the workshops demolished. The legacy of the Guild led to the creation of Ditchling Museum of Art + Craft in 1985, which was renovated and re-opened in 2013.

=== Meadows ===
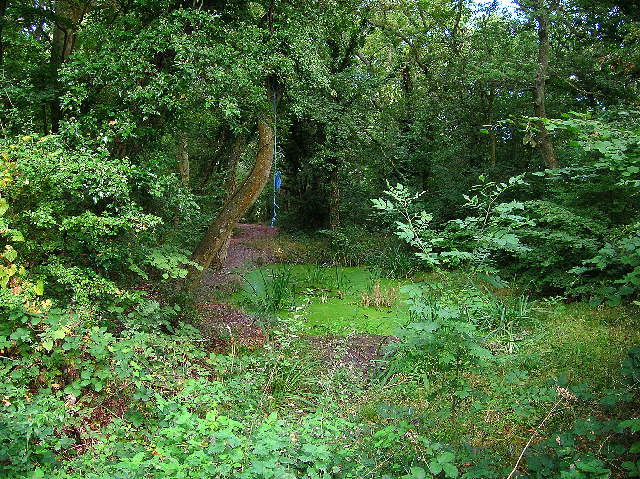
The Nye, Ditchling

East and north of Ditchling Common Lane, the fields are small and elongated. They were formed from the old strip-cultivated common fields. These Ditchling assarts have occasionally partially or completely escaped improvement for farming (thus improving the biodiversity). Grass snakes like this damp countryside.

The best 'assart' meadows are at the north end, though some have been damaged and others do not seem safe from damage. One small meadow next to the brook forms a sedge fen (TQ 335 168), dominated by oval sedge, with tufted hair grass, ragged robin, and spearwort (2011). In summer, it is alive with butterflies. Next to it a drier meadow has some betony and heath grass. It has clouds of burnet moths and Ichneumon flies of many colours, grass moths and grasshoppers.

On the east side of Jointer Copse there are two ancient lanes, Nye Lane and Wellcroft Lane, that cross each other, and make "a delightful tangle of stream, gullies, small pits and wooded banks" below some old oak trees. Surrounding this crossways are three fields which have been designated SNCI (Site of Nature Conservation Interest) status. The fields west of, and adjacent to The Nye (TQ 330 145) used to be rich in damp-loving valuable fen meadow plants, like sneezewort and pepper saxifrage, but the traditional pastures have been converted to hard-grazed horse paddocks. The tropical looking marsh helleborine orchid which has become vanishingly rare in the 21st centrum used to be found in numbers here.

South of The Nye, there is still the archaic Southmead meadow (TQ 333 140) on Wellcroft Lane, which is still has much floristic value. It has retained its traditional management since the 1960s following a regime of summer hay cut and aftermath sheep grazing. David Bangs, a Sussex field naturalist, says,

"It is a gem. In springtime drifts of Cowslips cover large parts, and, later on, there is abundant yellow rattle, ribwort plantain, knapweed, oxeye daisy and meadow barley. Adders tongue fern is very common. The mead lies half on the Gault, but the chalky influence is strong, with nettle leaved bellflower under the hedge. I have never seen cowslips so abundant on a Wealden site. It is an extraordinary survival, and a tribute to its owner's loving care (2013)".

=== Woods ===
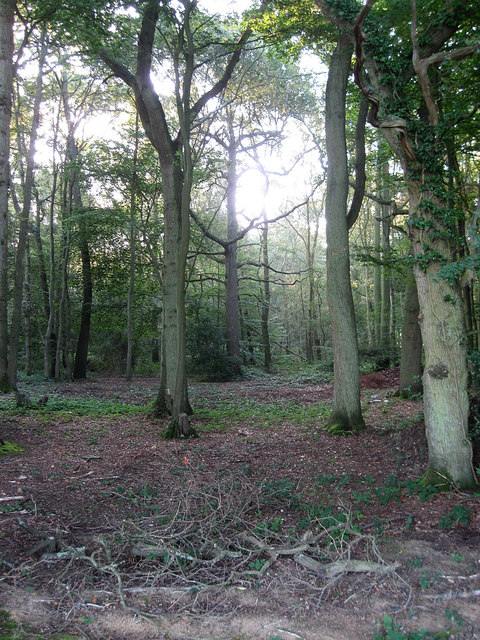
Purchase Wood

Purchase Wood (TQ 341 194) is to the east of the parish and is separated from West Wood by the Westmeston/Ditchling parish border and a wide green lane with braided tracks. It is an ancient woodland with wild service and big old trees, but it is open and mown on its south side where the graveyard of the nuns from St George's Retreat is located. Despite sitting on Weald Clay, it has considerable internal variety, particularly along the green lane track.

Jointer Copse (TQ 327 144) sits on Gault Clay and is a wet wood of young hazel coppice under old ash stools. You will also find in the woodland goldilocks buttercup, redcurrants, meadowsweet and angelica to complement the spring bluebells, ramsons and anemones, and the midland thorn and early dog violet.

=== Ditchling Common ===
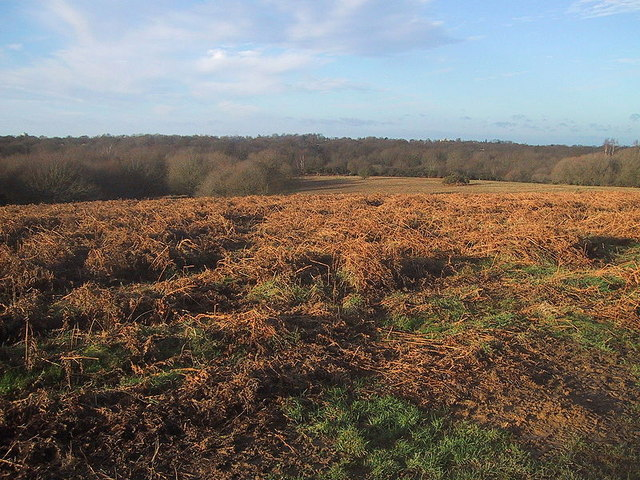
The bracken in Autumn on Ditchling Common.

Ditchling Common is probably the best old Wealden grassland site in central Sussex. It has been described as "one of the most precious jewels in the crown of the Low Weald". The Common is now split into two. The northern half was bought from the commoners (who collectively owned it) in 1974 by East Sussex County Council, de-designated as common land, and designated as a Country Park. The Country Park is well known for its spring time display of Bluebells. The southern half, south of Folders Lane East, is managed by the Commoners Association, and there you can still see great egg yellow sheets of dyer's greenweed in early summer. The area has lost much of its wild beauty due to the mismanagement by a few farmers and neglect, but there is hope that the area can be restored if adequate resources are provided. It is still home to many butterflies including a well established colony of the rare black hairstreak butterfly which was first identified there in 2017.

=== Scarp and downland ===
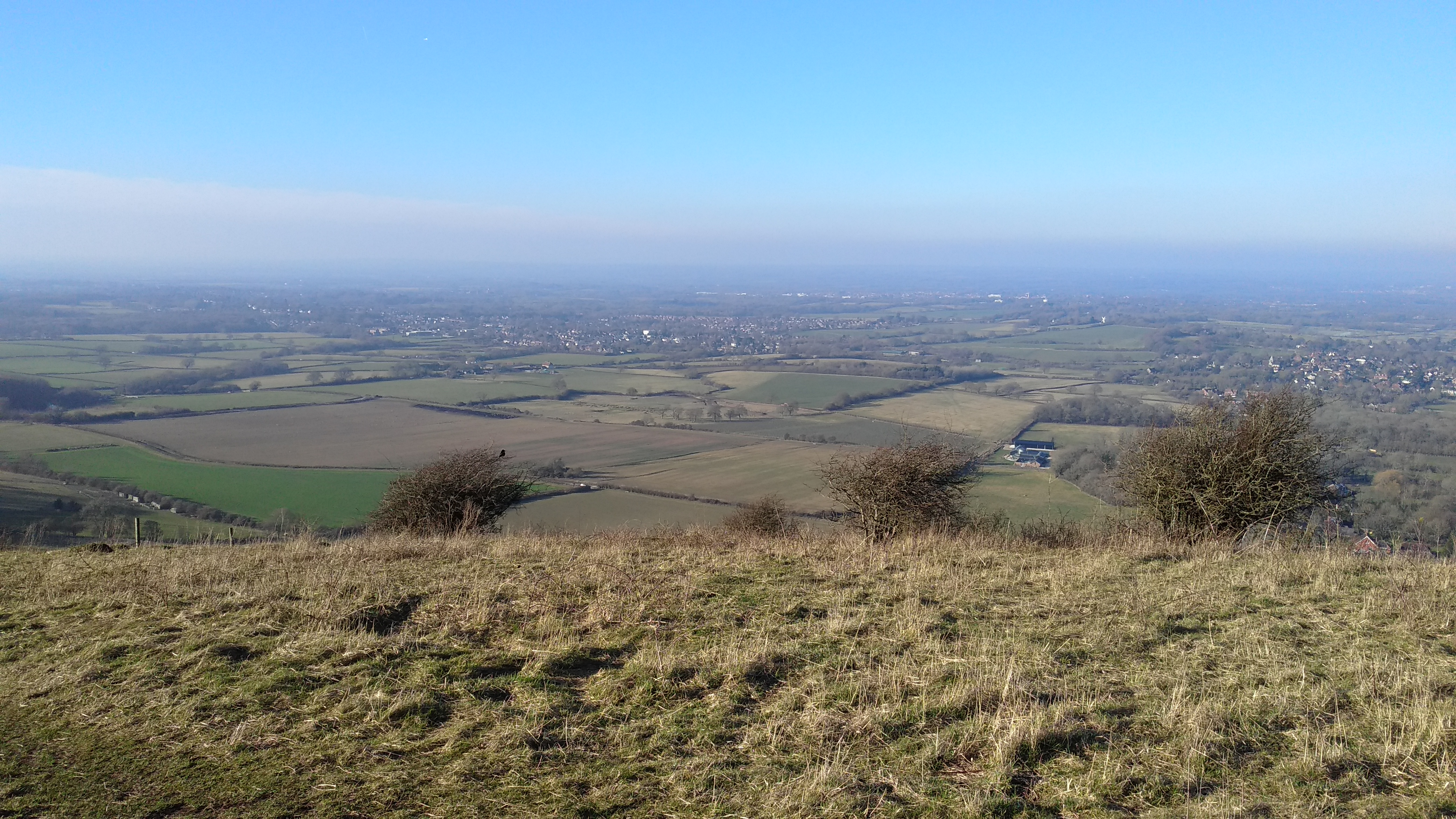
View from Ditchling beacon

The south of the parish rises to the top of the Downs, and the scarp slope forms part of the Clayton to Offham Escarpment Site of Special Scientific Interest. These Ditchling Downs were one of the last surviving local landscapes mantled by a unitary cover of ancient flowery chalk grassland. They were broken up by agri-business farmers in the 1950s. Many areas of species-rich ancient grassland do survive, however, both on the scarp and in the dip slope 'Bottoms', though they carry too great a cover of invasive thorn scrub. The area is known for the endangered and rare birds, which come from southern climes to breed here.

==== Ditchling Beacon and its bostals ====
At 813 ft (248 metres) Ditchling Beacon (TQ 331 130) is the highest point on the eastern Downs and offers far-reaching views across the Sussex Weald. It was an Iron Age Fort and has a number of barrows. There are three ancient bostals that descend the slopes and Clayton to Offham Escarpment, the central of which, Ditchling bostal, is now the busy motor road. They pass some of the best remaining chalk grasslands in East Sussex. Consequently, the area is an important area for wildlife including now rare plants, butterflies and moths. One hundred metres or so to the west from the bottom of the main Ditchling Bostals is Burnhouse Bostal which ascends the scarp from Underhill Lane and reaches the top above the velvety turf of the old quarries of Keymer Down. Along Burnhouse Bostal, the red listed birds of high conservation concern, spotted flycatcher, bred in 2021 indicating the importance of the SSSI.

==== Standean Farm ====
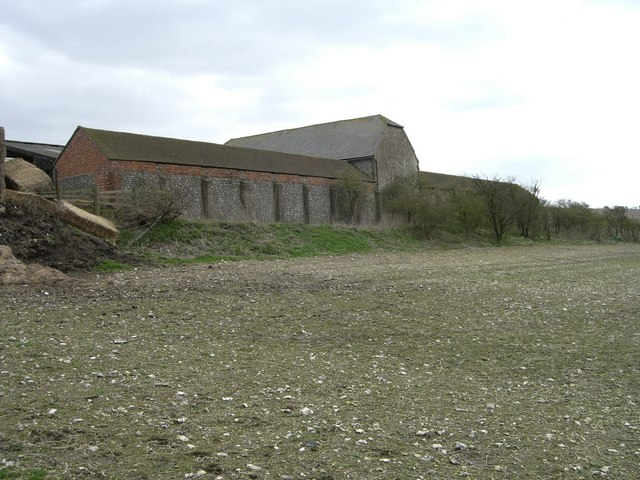
Standean New Barn

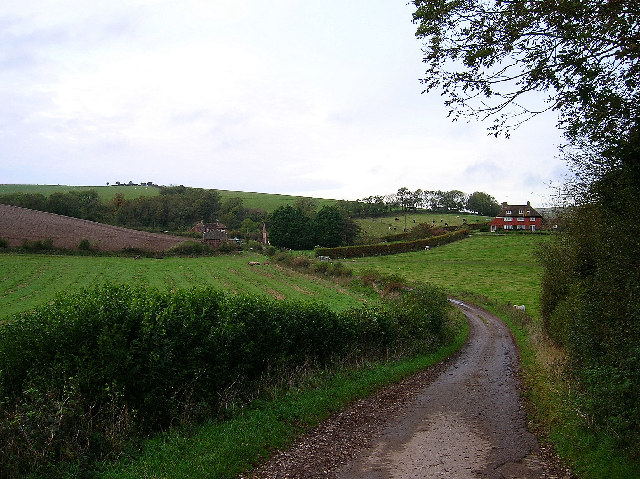
Lower Standean

Standean Farm is in a peaceful valley 'dean', although the high ridges to the west and east suffer from the traffic noise of the A27 bypass, the London Road and the Ditchling Road. The farm was gentrified in aristocratic fashion in the eighteenth century, with many small plantations, which were given names evocative of modern pleasure landscapes, like Wonderhill Plantation. Like the majority of areas over the Downs, Standean's Down pastures were ploughed up for arable crops and hence do not support the traditional downland biodiversity. There is only one intact fragment left on the valley's west side between Lower Standean and North Bottom (TQ 318 117). There are also many pen-reared, corn-fed partridges kept for recreational shooting.

The area has a rich prehistory. There are two clusters of sarsen stones, of a similar geology to those of Stonehenge. Some of these have been removed from their original spot and put in the private garden of Standean Farmhouse. However, one cluster survives by Rocky Pond (TQ 315 120) on the high slope north of Lower Standean.

There are some beautiful old flint barns, including New Barn and its two hovels up on the eastern hillside. The old flint farmhouse and cottages were destroyed by Canadian forces during the Second World War, when these Downs were a military training ground.

There is no designated Access Land on the farm despite its long ownership by Brighton Council.

==== High Park Corner ====
High Park Corner (TQ 329 116) sits in the Ditchling parish, next to High Park Farm, which sits in Westmeston parish. The area used to be a favourite site for gypsy encampments. Unfortunately there are accounts of regular visits from farmers and other thugs using violence to evict them, often organised by the Ditchling Constable. The Corner is now used for public car parking for walking or mountain biking either east into High Park Wood or west towards North Bottom.

==== Bottoms ====
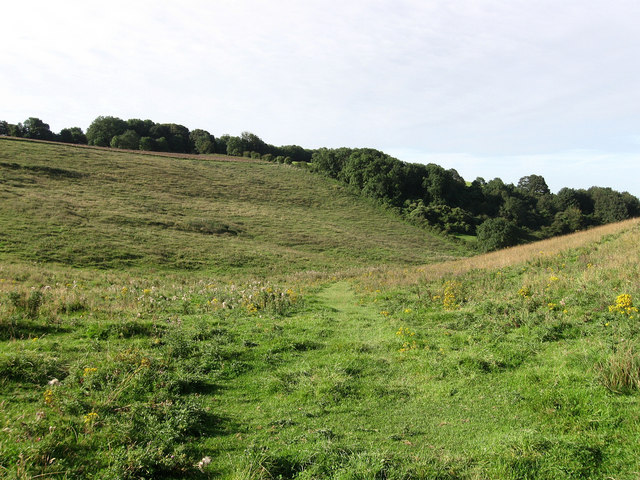
North Bottom

North Bottom runs down from High Park Corner and is one route to Dencher Bottom. It has a northern slope (TQ 323 119) which retains its soft and ancient sheep's fescue, with spring sedge and cowslip in spring and carline thistle, rampion and autumn ladies' tresses orchids in August and September. The upper part of North Bottom (TQ 327 117) shows the ridges of an old field system beneath its turf. On its north side there is early purple orchid in spring, chalkhill blue butterflies, rockrose, horseshoe vetch and spring sedge in summer and waxcaps in autumn.

Home Bottom (TQ 392 063) is another route to Dencher Bottom from Ditchling Beacon. The valley has already been damaged by agrochemicals, but as it is an SSSI Impact Risk Zone it is no longer "improved" and old wildlife is returning.

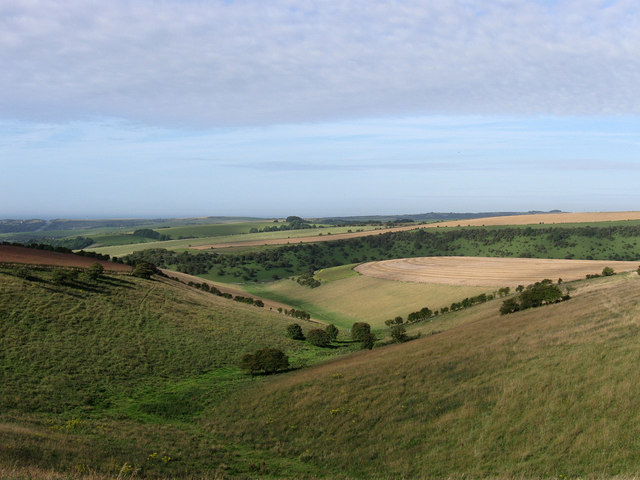
Hogtrough Bottom1

Hogtrough Bottom (TQ 326 126) runs down to Dencher Bottom from Tenantry Down. It is largely unimproved and hence supports much archaic meadow plants. Juniper was here until the 1930s and ling heather, signifier of these clay-with-flints soils, is still present at the top slope, although it risks being swamped by surrounding Gorse. Dyer's Greenweed, another signifier of clay-with-flint, is also at the top of the slope top with the tormentil flower. In spring the hillside is tinted with early purple orchids and cowslips. There are many butterflies in summer too and dark green fritillary can be present. Bangs describes the view, "Dry grass bends before the breeze and betony, harebell, rampion and hawkbit colour-up the ground like a Turkish carpet".

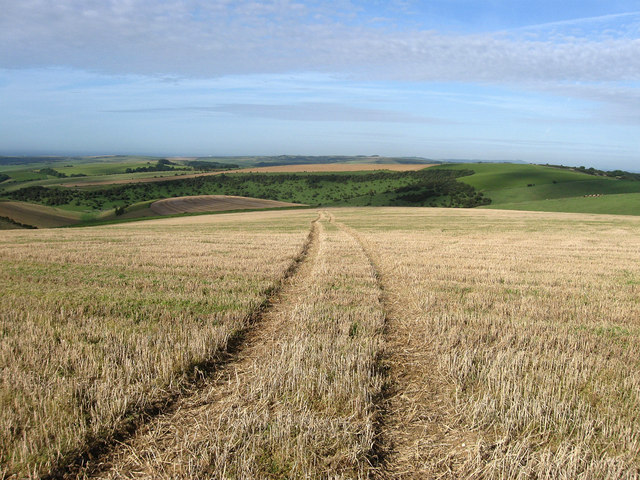
Downland near Ditchling Beacon

Dencher Bottom (TQ 317 125) is an ancient pasture, consisting of large old anthills that speckle the valley slopes. There is a presence of chalk milkwort and devil's bit scabious. There are also species of spiders, such as the purse-web spider, Atypus affinis, and boxing gloves spider, Alopecosa cuneata.

The valley has two aspects: a shadier western slope and a hot south-facing slope. This latter slope can feel Mediterranean as it is dry with colourful gorse. Chalkhill blue and brown argus butterflies bob and dance. In autumn, it has fungi such as boletes and amanitas which grow symbiotically with the sun-loving rockrose. The cooler, western slope is better for old meadow waxcap fungi. Across both slopes, eighteen species of fungi have been recorded including fairy clubs, pinkgills, crimson waxcap and scarlet hood. Special bees can be found here too, including the bellflower bee. When it's raining you can find them curled up inside harebell flowers, which they neatly fit, like little flower fairies. Game rearing pens exist in the area, some used, some unused.

==== Ditchling's ex-Tenantry Down ====
Ditchling's ex-Tenantry Down is a plateau (TQ 326 126) that runs for over a mile south from Ditchling Beacon. It used to be one of Ditchling's two commons. It was a form of medieval common particular to the Downs. The common included most of Ditchling Beacon's Iron Age hill fort and the heads of three dry valleys (North, Home and Hogtrough Bottom), two of which retain their rich old Down pastures. In 1978 the plateau part of the common was stripped of its common land status and is now privately owned by Tenantry Down Ltd. Had its common land status survived, we would all have public access to the entire Down thanks to the passing of the Countryside and Rights of Way Act in 2000. The fragments of old Down pasture which survive there were not designated as Access Land, though they should have been. Hares seem to be doing well in this area.

== Governance ==
Ditchling is part of the electoral ward called Ditchling and Westmeston. The population of this ward at the 2011 census was 2,424.

Ditchling is represented in the UK Parliament by the Lewes constituency. The current serving MP is the Liberal Democrat James MacCleary who won the seat in the 2024 general election.

== Education ==
There is one school in Ditchling, Ditchling (St Margaret's) Church of England Primary School. This is a voluntary controlled primary school for children aged 2–11. In 2022, the school became an academy and joined the Hurst Education Trust, sponsored by the nearby independent school, Hurstpierpoint College. Many of the children after leaving this school go to Downlands Community School in the village of Hassocks located in the adjoining county of West Sussex. Located in the centre of the village is Ditchling Museum of Art + Craft.

== Notable residents ==
- Sir Frank Brangwyn – artist, painter, water colourist, virtuoso engraver and illustrator and progressive designer
- Raymond Briggs – illustrator, cartoonist, graphic novelist and author (in nearby Westmeston)
- S. F. Edge – racing driver
- Queen Camilla - grew up nearby and went to school in Ditchling.
- Rowland Emett – Punch cartoonist and mechanical designer.
- Herbie Flowers – musician
- Eric Gill – sculptor, typeface designer, stonecutter, and printmaker.
- Mascal Gyles – Vicar of Ditchling between 1621 and 1644
- James Hodson – cricketer, born in Ditchling
- Bernard Holden – railway engineer, president of Bluebell Railway
- Peter James – writer
- Edward Johnston – craftsman, who is regarded as the father of modern calligraphy
- David Jones – poet
- John Vernon Lord – illustrator, author and teacher
- Dame Vera Lynn – singer
- Esther Meynell – writer, author of Sussex Cottage (1936)
- John Neal – cricketer
- Hilary Pepler – printer, writer and poet
- Brocard Sewell – Carmelite friar and literary figure
- Sir Donald Sinden – actor
- Hilary Stratton - sculptor and pupil of Eric Gill
- Jamie Theakston – radio presenter
- Len Howard – naturalist and musician
