= Newman Howard =

British writer (1861–1929)

Henry Newman Howard (16 June 1861 – 5 March 1929) was an English poet and dramatist. His first book, Footsteps of Proserpine and Other Verses and Interludes, was published by Elliot Stock in 1897. He then wrote a series of critically praised blank verse tragedies, which he called "the Christian Trilogy", beginning with Kiartan the Icelander in 1902, followed by Savanarola: a City's Tragedy in 1904 and Constantine the Great in 1906. Kiartan (whose theme was "the introduction of Christianity into Iceland"), in particular, was singled out for praise, Joseph B. Gilder remarking in the Bookman that "If anyone writing English verse today has achieved anything more imaginative or more beautiful than the last sixteen lines of Kiartan, the Icelander, it has escaped my observation." His collected poems and tragedies were published by Macmillan and Co. in 1913.

Newman Howard was the father of Gwendolen "Len" Howard (1894–1973), the British naturalist, author, and musician.

== Bibliography ==
- Footsteps of Proserpine and Other Verses and Interludes (1897)
- Kiartan the Icelander: a Tragedy (1902)
- Savonarola: a City's Tragedy (1904)
- Constantine the Great: a Tragedy (1906)
- Collected Poems (1913)
