= Len Howard =

Musician and Naturalist

Gwendolen Howard (1894 – 5 January 1973) was a British naturalist and musician. She is known for the unique amateur bird studies that were published in various periodicals and two books under her pseudonym, Len Howard.

== Early life ==
Gwendolen Howard was the last of four children born to Henry Newman Howard (1861–1929), the British poet and dramatist, and Florence Howard, née Warman. Born in the town of Wallington, Howard lived with her family in various homes throughout England and Wales before beginning a music career in London, where she gave music lessons, organized concerts for children of the poor, and played viola in an orchestra under Malcolm Sargent. In 1938, Howard purchased a plot of land outside the village of Ditchling and arranged for construction of the home she later called "Bird Cottage."

== Work on birds ==
Once resident in Bird Cottage, Howard developed an intimate, cohabitational relationship with the wild birds in the area, providing food (including her own war rations), chasing away predators, tending to damaged nests, and allowing the birds to fly and roost throughout her home. Around 1949, Howard began publishing her field notes and "bird biographies" in British natural history periodicals, and in 1950 her first book was published by Collins Press. Howard continued to write and publish about her birds until at least 1957.

Believing that fear is the primary motivating factor in much of avian behaviour as observed by humans, and wanting to combat the scientific conclusions that had been drawn from such observations, Howard strove to effect great control over her and her birds' environment so as to maximize her birds' sense of security, and to encourage an uninhibited relationship with them. To this end, Howard was reclusive and gave strict instructions to those who ventured to visit her or contact her at Bird Cottage.

Howard also undertook a public campaign in 1960 to prevent development on the land surrounding her property.

In her writings, Howard argued that individual intelligence, and not mere instinct, is a factor in much of bird behaviour. Howard paid especial attention to great tits in her studies, although she also wrote about other tits, robins, sparrows, blackbirds, thrushes, and finches, among others, and singled out particularly striking individuals for her biographies. Howard's musical training gave her unique insight into birdsong, and the final section of her first book is devoted to an in-depth analysis of this topic.

== Death ==
Gwendolen Howard died on 5 January 1973, at Bird Cottage, at the age of 79.

== Publications ==
- Various articles in Out of Doors and Countrygoer (prior to 1950, these were separate publications; Howard was published approximately from 1951–1957).
- Birds as Individuals. London: Collins Press, 1952. ISBN 0002114569
- Various articles in The Countryman (approximately from 1953–1957), including "Two Nesting Seasons" 54:1 (Spring 1957).
- Living with Birds. London: Collins Press, 1956. ISBN 0002114569

== Popular culture ==
In 2016, a novel based on Len Howard's life and work, Het Vogelhuis, written by the Dutch author Eva Meijer, was published in the Netherlands. It has subsequently been translated into several languages. The English translation by Antoinette Fawcett, Bird Cottage, was published world-wide by Pushkin Press in 2018.
