= John Neal (cricketer) =

English cricketer

Personal information
- Full name: John Howard Neal
- Born: 18 October 1926; Ditchling, Sussex, England
- Died: 18 April 2012 (aged 85); Haywards Heath, Sussex, England
- Batting: Right-handed
- Role: Wicket-keeper

Domestic team information
- Years: Team
- 1950–1951: Sussex

Career statistics
Competition	First-class
Matches	1
Runs scored	28
Batting average	14.00
100s/50s	0/0
Top score	23
Catches/stumpings	0/0
- Source: Cricinfo, 2 April 2020

John Howard Neal (18 October 1926 – 18 April 2012) was an English cricketer. Neal was a right-handed batsman who fielded as a wicket-keeper. He was born at Ditchling, Sussex and educated at Hurstpierpoint College.

Neal made his debut for Sussex in the 1950 Minor Counties Championship against Essex. Neal played a further two Minor Counties Championship matches from 1950 to 1951. Neal made a single first-class appearance for Sussex against Lancashire at Old Trafford in 1951. In Sussex's first-innings, he scored 5 runs before being dismissed by Malcolm Hilton. In their second-innings, he was dismissed for 23 runs by Alan Wharton. This was his only major appearance for Sussex.

Neal died in hospital on 18 April 2012 after a short illness.
