= James Hodson (cricketer) =

English cricketer (1808–1879)

Personal information
- Full name: James Hodson
- Born: 3 October 1808; Ditchling, Sussex, England
- Died: 17 March 1879 (aged 70); Hunston, Sussex, England
- Batting: Right-handed
- Bowling: Right-arm roundarm medium

Domestic team information
- Years: Team
- 1838–1854: Sussex

Career statistics
Competition	First-class
Matches	54
Runs scored	620
Batting average	7.84
100s/50s	–/–
Top score	44
Balls bowled	1,373
Wickets	95
Bowling average	16.20
5 wickets in innings	3
10 wickets in match	–
Best bowling	8/?
Catches/stumpings	48/–
- Source: Cricinfo, 9 February 2012

James Hodson (30 October 1808 – 17 March 1879) was an English cricketer. Hodson was a right-handed batsman who bowled right-arm roundarm medium pace. He was born at Ditchling, Sussex.

Hodson made his first-class debut for Sussex against Kent in 1838. Sussex County Cricket Club was formed the following season, with Hodson playing in the team's first-class debut against the Marylebone Cricket Club at Lord's. In total, he made 51 first-class appearances for Sussex, the last of which came against Surrey in 1854. He took 95 wickets with his roundarm bowling, at an average of 15.58. He took three five wicket hauls during his career, achieving best innings figures against the Marylebone Cricket Club in 1839. Hodson took 8 wickets in the Marylebone Cricket Club's first innings, though his exact bowling figures are not recorded. These figures made Hodson the first person to take a five wicket haul for Sussex County Cricket Club. With the bat, Hodson scored 554 runs at a batting average of 7.48, with a high score of 44. In addition to playing for Sussex, both before and after the county club was founded, Hodson appeared for an England XI, the Players and the All England Eleven.

He died at Hunston Mill, near Hunston, Sussex on 17 March 1879.
