= Esther Meynell =

English writer (1878–1955)

- Born: Esther Hallam Moorhouse; 1878; Leeds, Yorkshire
- Died: February 4, 1955 (aged 76); Ditchling, East Sussex
- Occupation: Writer (novelist)
- Spouse: Gerard Tuke Meynell
- Relatives: Alice Meynell, aunt
- Writing career
- Pen name: E. Hallam Moorhouse
- Period: 20th century
- Genres: Fiction, non-fiction

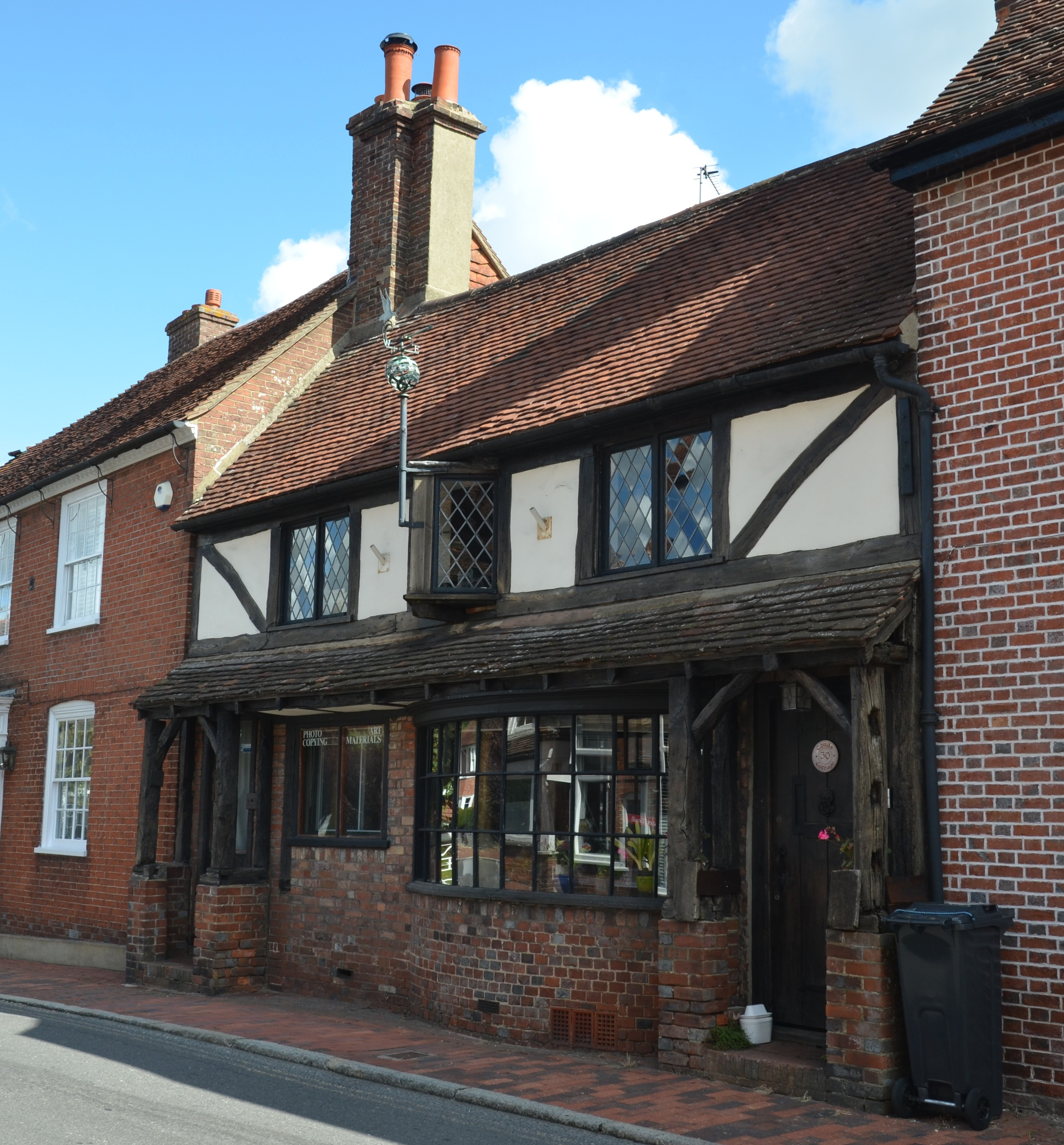
Conds Cottage, Ditchling, formerly Esther Meynell's home.

Esther Hallam Meynell née Moorhouse; 1878 – 4 February 1955) was an English novelist and biographer.

== Biography ==
Meynell was born in Leeds, West Riding of Yorkshire. Her father was the Yorkshire Quaker Samuel Moorhouse. The family moved to Sussex when Esther was ten, living at 6, Highcroft Villas in Brighton, before moving (by 1901) to Redholm, London Road in Patcham.

She married Gerard Tuke Meynell, a master printer and typographer, the nephew of poet and suffragist Alice Meynell and cousin of writer Viola Meynell. They had two daughters and lived in London and then Pulborough, Sussex. During the 1930s they moved to Ditchling, and there lived in, built or converted various properties, activities described in Sussex Cottage (1936), Building a Cottage (1937) and Cottage Tale (1946), describing Conds Cottage, High Street, Ditching. She was widowed in 1942. In 1947 she converted Beulah Baptist Chapel into a house, No. 9 East End Lane.

Meynell died at Conds Cottage in February 1955. The house has since been extended.

== Works ==
She is best known for The Little Chronicle of Magdalena Bach (1925), a fictional autobiography of Anna Magdalena Bach, the wife of composer Johann Sebastian Bach. Other works with musical themes include the novels Quintet (1933), whose hero is a world famous pianist; Grave Fairytale (1931) whose principal character is reminiscent of Beethoven; and Time's Door (1935), which belongs to the genre of fantastic fiction and features a violinist who "timeslips" to the 18th century where he becomes involved with Bach. In 1933 Meynell also completed a biography of J. S. Bach, one of Duckworth's "Great Lives" Series.

Her first book, Nelson’s Lady Hamilton (1906) was a biography of Emma, Lady Hamilton, mistress of Lord Nelson, the first of a series of books on naval history written under her maiden name. English Spinster: a portrait (1939) is a fictional treatment of the life of Mary Russell Mitford, author of Our Village. Other biographies include The Young Lincoln (1944) and Portrait of William Morris (1947).

=== As E. Hallam Moorhouse ===
- Nelson's Lady Hamilton, (1906)
- Samuel Pepys: Administrator, Observer, Gossip, (1909)
- Letters Of The English Seamen, (1910)
- Wordsworth, (1911)
- Nelson In England: A Domestic Chronicle, (1913)
- Sea Magic, (1916)

=== As Esther Meynell ===
- The Story Of Hans Andersen, (1924)
- The Little Chronicle Of Magdalena Bach, (1925)
- Grave Fairytale, (1931), novel
- Quintet, (1933), novel
- Bach, ('Great Lives' series, 1933)
- Time's Door, (1935), novel
- Sussex Cottage, (1936)
- Building A Cottage, (1937)
- Lucy And Amades, (1938), novel
- English Spinster: A Portrait, (1939)
- A Woman Talking, (1940), memoir
- Country Ways, (1942)
- The Young Lincoln, (1944)
- Cottage Tale, (1945)
- Sussex, (County Books series) (1947)
- Portrait Of William Morris, (1947)
- Tale Told To Terry, (1950)
- Small Talk In Sussex, (1954), memoir
